= Tunjščica =

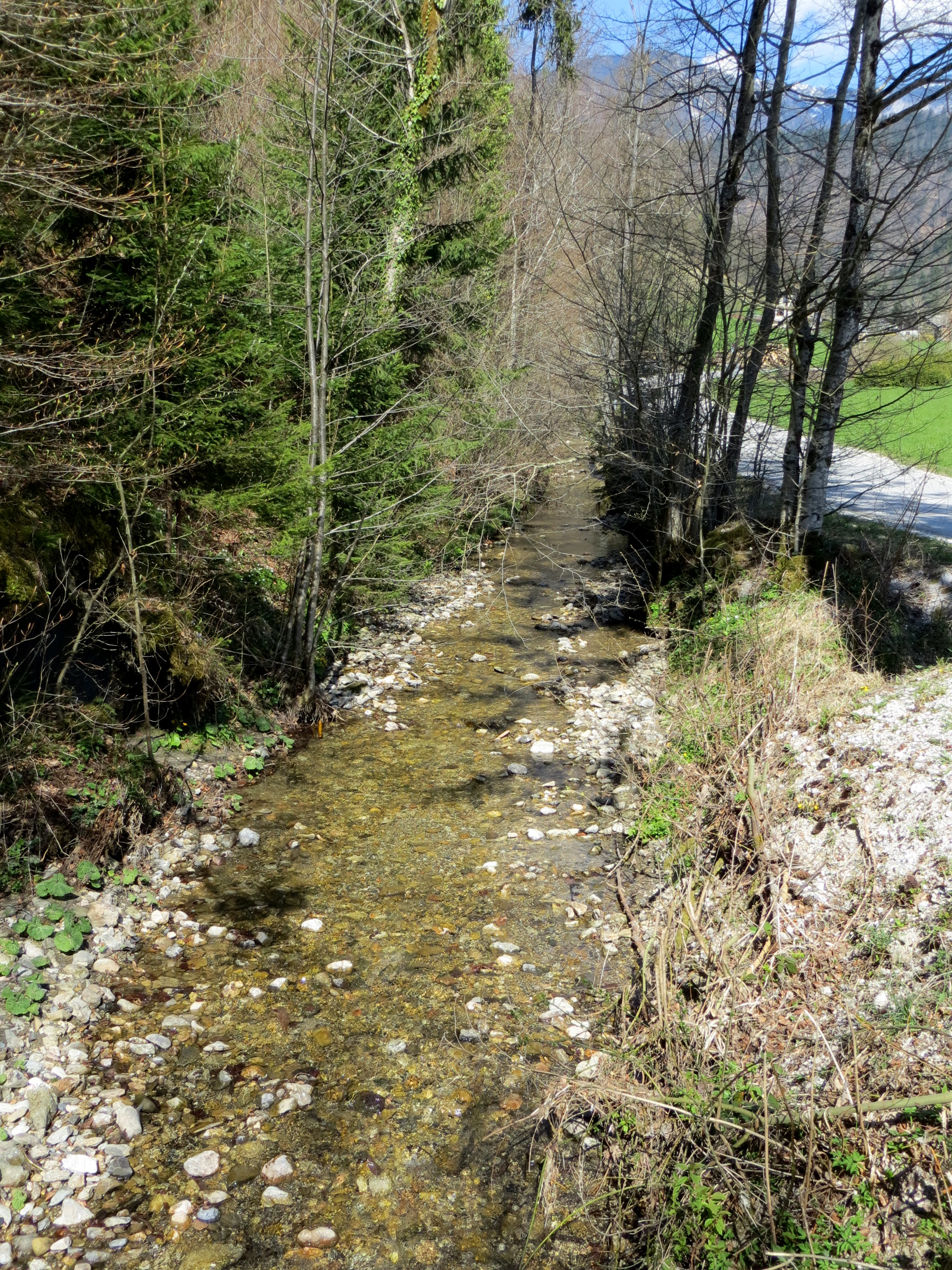
- Tunjščica Creek in Laniše

Location
- Country: Slovenia

Physical characteristics
- Source
  - location: South slope of Mount Krvavec in the Kamnik–Savinja Alps
  - elevation: 750 m (2,460 ft)
- Mouth
  - location: Pšata in Moste
  - coordinates: 46.1948°N 14.5473°E
- Length: 14 km (8.7 mi)

Basin features
- Progression: Pšata→ Kamnik Bistrica→ Sava→ Danube→ Black Sea

Tunjščica Creek (also known locally as Tunjica Creek) is a left tributary of the Pšata River in Slovenia. It is about 14 kilometers (8.7 mi) long and has its origin at 750 meters (2,460 ft) above sea level on the south slope of Mount Krvavec in the Kamnik–Savinja Alps above the hamlet of Senožeti in Sveti Lenart. It flows past or through Sidraž, Laniše, Tunjice, Tunjiška Mlaka, and Gora pri Komendi before emptying into the Pšata at Moste. Tributaries of Tunjščica Creek include Praproščica Creek (a.k.a. Prapretčica Creek).
