= Kaplja Vas, Komenda =

Kaplja Vas
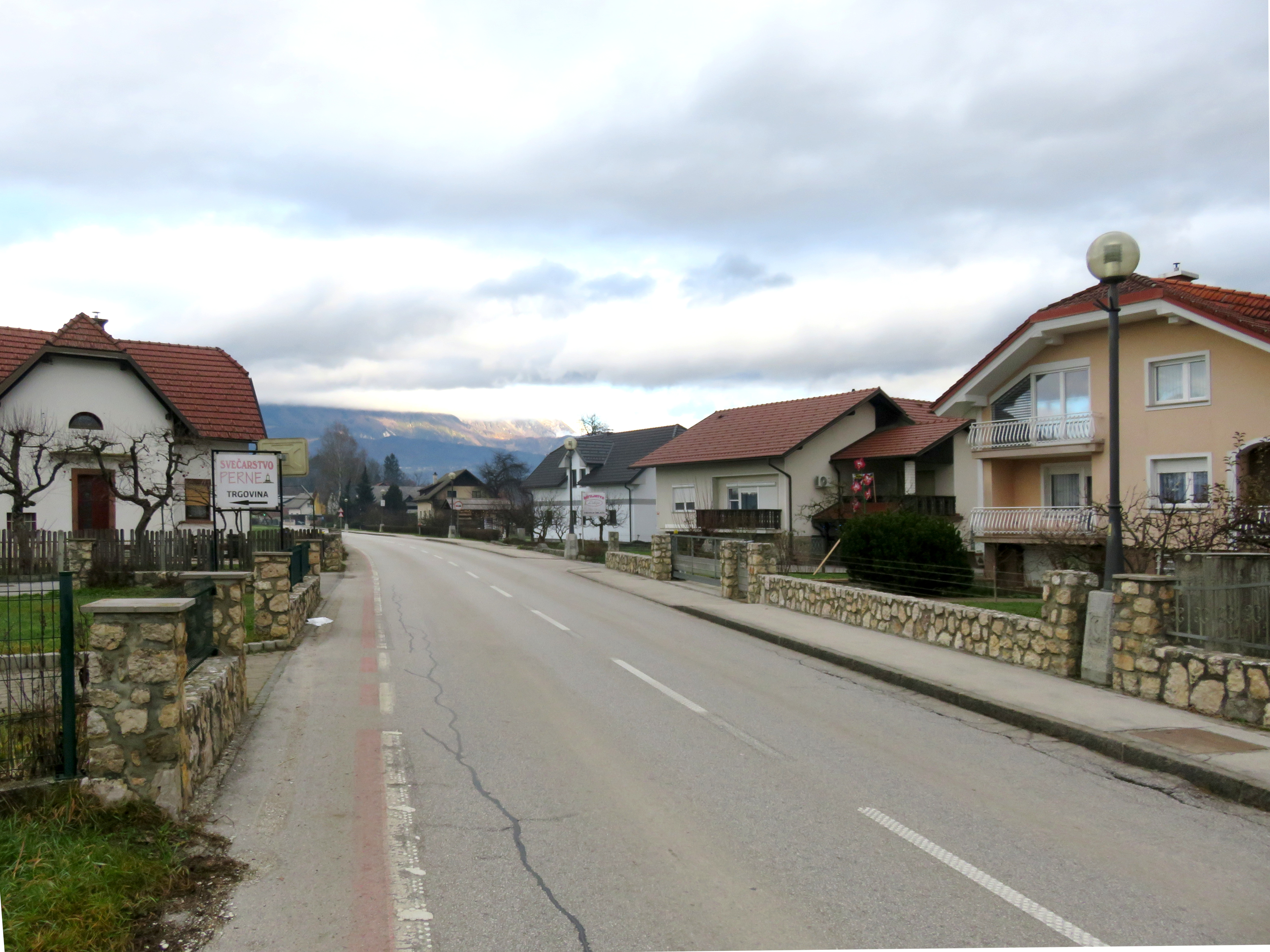

- Location in Slovenia
- Coordinates: 46°11′59.72″N 14°32′34.73″E
- Country: Slovenia
- Traditional region: Upper Carniola
- Statistical region: Central Slovenia
- Municipality: Komenda

Area
  - Total: 0.27 km^{2} (0.10 sq mi)
- Elevation: 336 m (1,102 ft)

Kaplja Vas (pronounced [ˈkaːplja ˈʋaːs]; Slovene: Kaplja vas, frequently also Kapla vas, German: Kaplawas) is a formerly independent settlement in the southern part of the village of Komenda in central Slovenia. It belongs to the Municipality of Komenda. It is part of the traditional region of Upper Carniola and is now included with the rest of the municipality in the Central Slovenia Statistical Region.

== Geography ==
Kaplja Vas is an elongated village stretching along the road from Komenda to Moste. It lies above the Pšata River. The village has extensive fields but limited wooded land.

== Name ==
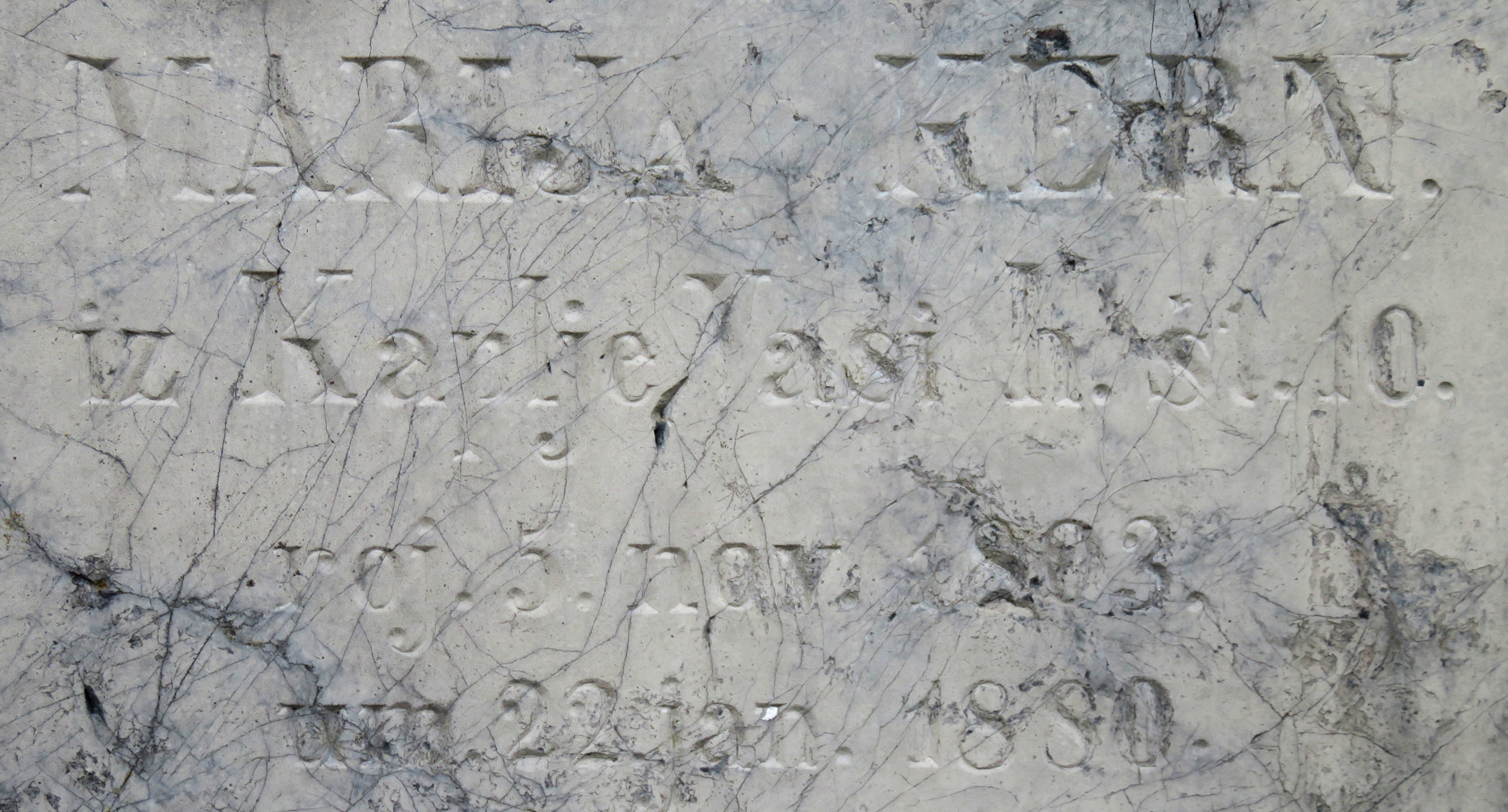
Gravestone detail mentioning Kaplja Vas

Kaplja Vas was originally named Kapela vas (literally, 'chapel village') in reference to a chapel dedicated to Saint Peter that was later developed into a church (now in Komenda). Until about 1800, the hamlet below the church was known as Apnenice. In the past the German name of the village was Kaplawas.

== History ==
Fragments of prehistoric pottery, roof tiles and remains of walls from antiquity, and a Roman coin from AD 276–283 have been discovered in Kaplja Vas, attesting to early settlement in the area. Continuity of settlement is indicated by the discovery of early Slavic graves near the parish church and a fragment of a quern. In the past, Kaplja Vas produced large quantities of wine; the village also had two grain mills and two sawmills. During the Second World War, the Partisans operated an underground print shop at the Mejač farm in Kaplja Vas from the end of March to mid-May 1944, after which it was relocated to Mlaka. A Home Guard post was established in the village in mid-August 1944. Kaplja Vas was annexed by the village of Komenda in 1952, ending its existence as an independent settlement.
