= Ivo Zorman =

- Born: 3 May 1926; Gora pri Komendi, Kingdom of Serbs, Croats and Slovenes (now in Slovenia)
- Died: 14 January 2009 (aged 82); Kamnik, Slovenia
- Occupations: writer and editor
- Writing career
- Notable works: Draga moja Iza, V sedemnajstem, V tem mesecu se osipa mak
- Notable awards: Levstik Award; 1969 for V tem mesecu se osipa mak

Ivo Zorman (3 May 1926 – 14 January 2009) was a Slovene writer and editor. He wrote short stories and novels as well as radio plays.

Zorman was born in the village of Gora near Komenda in central Slovenia in 1926. He went to school in Ljubljana and as a young man participated in the Slovene resistance and joined the Partisans. After the war he worked as a teacher for a while and then an editor until his retirement in 1977. He often used themes from his experiences in the war in his work. One of his best-known novels is Draga moja Iza (Μy Dear Iza) which was made into a film in 1979. He died in Kamnik in 2009.

In 1969 he won the Levstik Award for his book V tem mesecu se osipa mak (This is the Month the Poppies Scatter).

== Published works ==
Adult Prose

- Trije Borjanovi (The Borjan Three), 1955
- Čez dvajset let bo vse drugače (In Twenty Years All Will Be Different), 1968
- Pedagoška komedija (The Educational Comedy), 1971
- Draga moja Iza (My Dear Iza), 1973
- Sončnica navadna (The Plain Sunflower), 1974
- Stric Benjamin (Uncle Benjamin), 1977
- Medved z budilko (The Bear with an Alarm Clock), 1982
- Vonj po jeseni (Smell of Autumn), 1978
- Dom človekov (A Man's Home), 1981
- Kdo bo meni prižgal sveče (Who Shall Light Candles for Me), 1982
- Portret revolucionarja Malusa (A Portrait of Malus the Revolutionary), 1985
- Leta herojev (Years of Heroes), 1988
- Lectovo srce (Lebkuchen Heart), 1989
- V znamenju tehtnice (In the Sign of Virgo), 1989
- Stiska bogov (Anguish of the Gods), 1991
- Donata (Donata), 1991
- Kajnov rod (Cain's Clan), 1991
- Vila Bagari (Villa Bagari), 1997
- Ko odletijo lastovke (When The Swallows Fly Away), 1999
- Okus po marcipanu (A Taste of Marzipan), 2002

Prose for Young Readers

- Iz obroča (Out of the Ring), 1953
- Svobodni gozdovi (Free Forests), 1954
- Eno samo je življenje (We Only Live Once), 1963
- Na senčni strani mesta (On the Shady Side of Town), 1967
- Gnezdo sršenov (A Hornets' Nest), 1968
- V tem mesecu se osipa mak (This is the Month the Poppies Scatter), 1969
- V sedemnajstem (At Seventeen), 1972
- Storžkovo popoldne (Storžek's Afternoon), 1973
- Rosni zaliv (Dew Bay), 1975
- Tinčevi divji doživljaji (Little Tine's Wild Adventures), 1978
- Naši kurirji (Our Partisan Couriers), 1978
- Uporne Dražgoše (Dražgoše the Village That Rebelled), 1978
- Bolničarka Vida (Vida the Partisan Nurse), 1978
- Rada bi bila velika (I Would Like to Grow Up), 1979
- Obveščevalec Lesnika (Lesnika the Informer), 1979
- Deklica iz Mihovega mlina (The Girl from Miha's Mill), 1982
- Hrčki smrčki (Sniffy Hamsters), 1983
- Oh, ta naša babica (Oh, This Granny of Ours), 1986
- Sla po letenju (A Desire to Fly), 1987
- Račka Puhačka (Fluffy Duckling), 1988
- Ded Nil in teta Filipa (Grandpa Nil and Aunt Phillipa), 1989
- Bolečina odraščanja (Growing Pains), 1993
