= Podboršt pri Komendi =

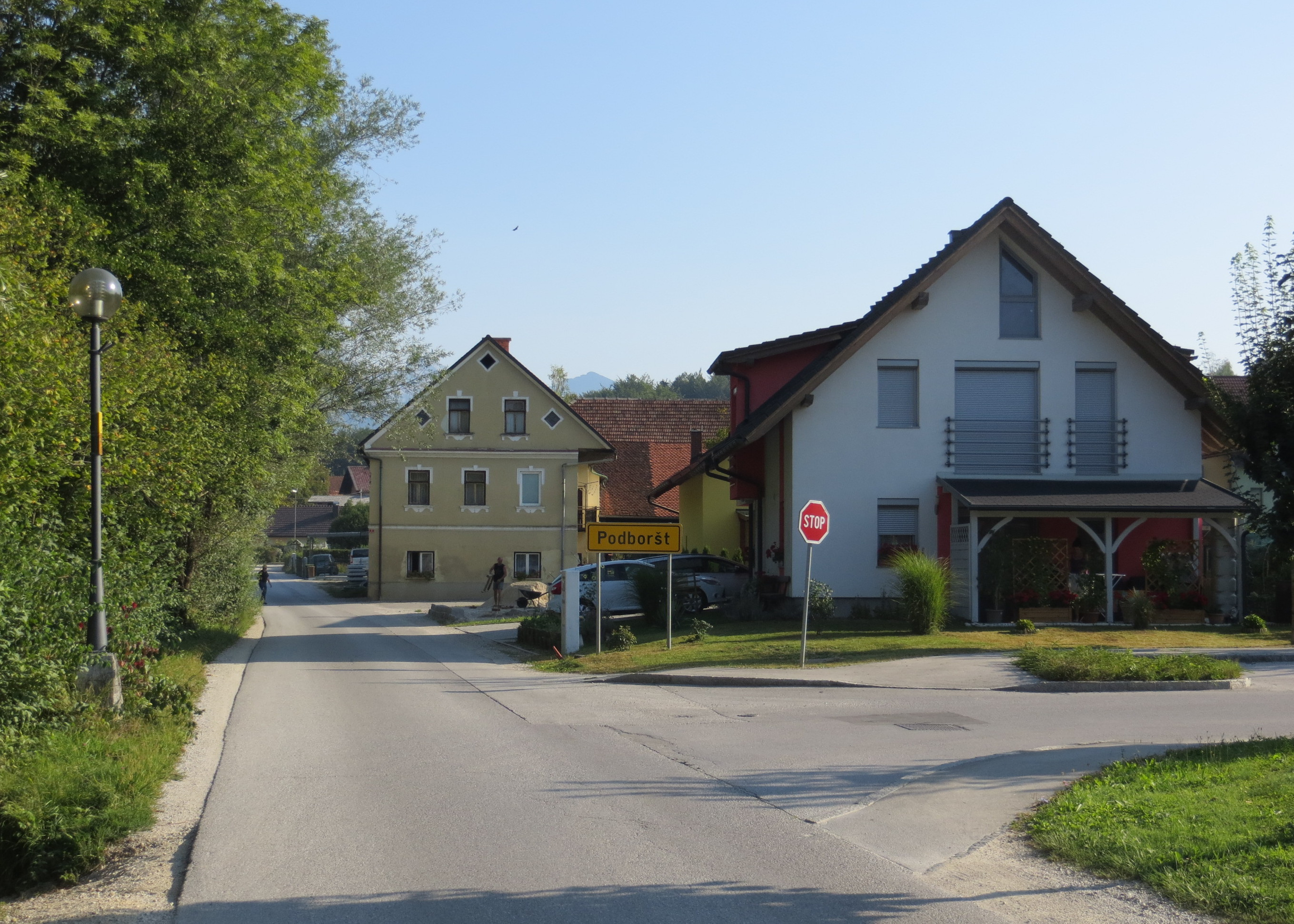

- Location in Slovenia
- Coordinates: 46°12′46.67″N 14°32′35.78″E
- Country: Slovenia
- Traditional region: Upper Carniola
- Statistical region: Central Slovenia
- Municipality: Komenda

Area
  - Total: 0.35 km^{2} (0.14 sq mi)
- Elevation: 347.5 m (1,140 ft)

Population (2002)
  - Total: 184

Podboršt pri Komendi (pronounced [pɔdˈbɔɾʃt pɾi kɔˈmɛːndi]) is a settlement immediately north of Komenda in the Upper Carniola region of Slovenia.

== Name ==
The name of the settlement was changed from Podboršt to Podboršt pri Komendi in 1953.
