= Laniše, Kamnik =

Laniše
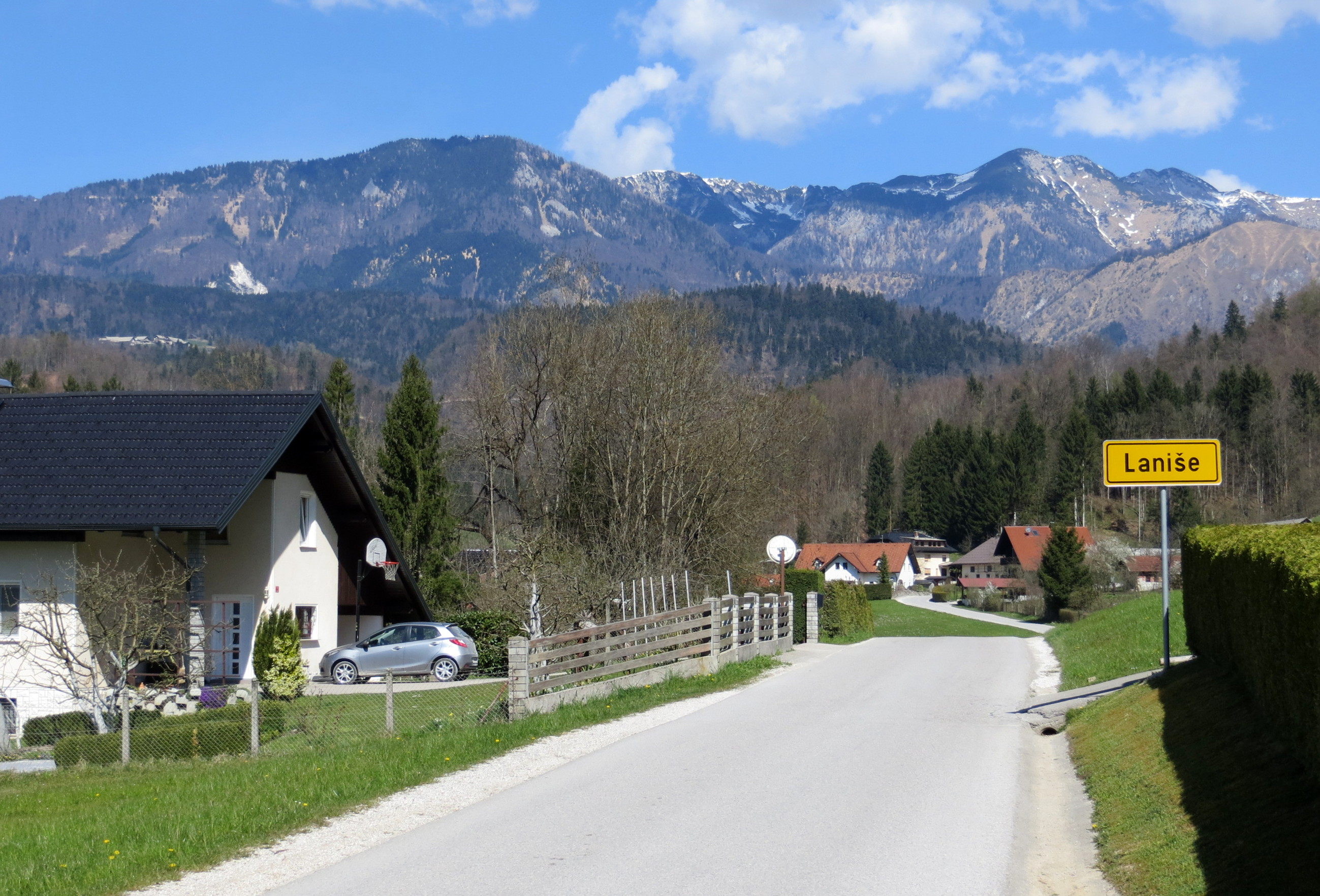

- Location in Slovenia
- Coordinates: 46°15′10.28″N 14°34′32.72″E
- Country: Slovenia
- Traditional region: Upper Carniola
- Statistical region: Central Slovenia
- Municipality: Kamnik
- Elevation: 423.2 m (1,388 ft)

Population (2002)
  - Total: 70

Laniše (pronounced [laˈniːʃɛ]; in older sources also Lanišče, German: Lanische) is a dispersed settlement in the Municipality of Kamnik in the Upper Carniola region of Slovenia.

== Name ==
The name Laniše is a dialect alteration of the older form Lanišče. The name is derived from the common noun lan 'flax', referring to a place where flax was grown.

== Geography ==
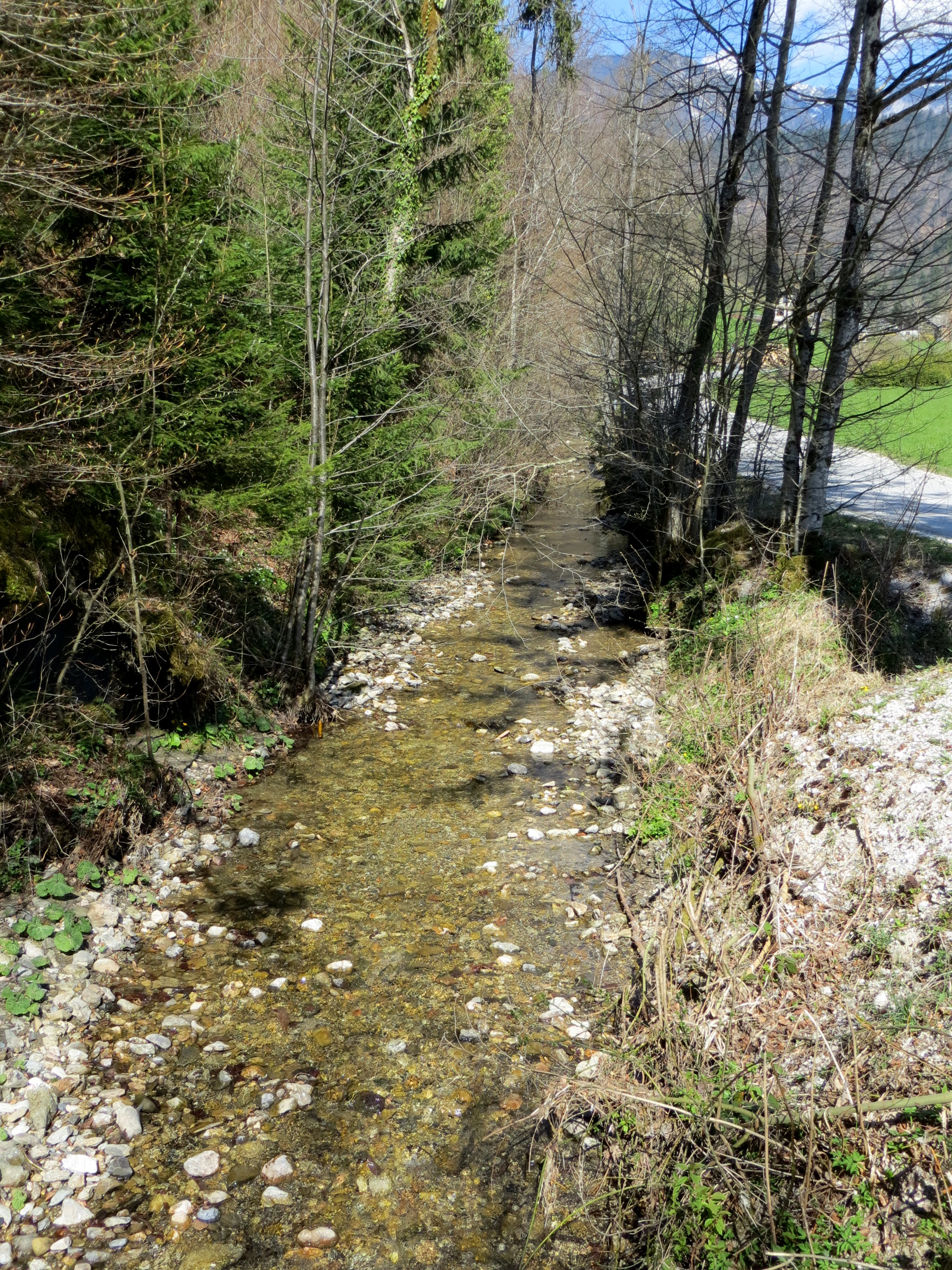
Tunjščica Creek in Laniše

Laniše is a scattered rural settlement in the upper part of the Tunjščica Valley. Tunjščica Creek, a tributary of the Pšata River, flows through the village from the north and the valley begins to widen at this point. The village lies in a protected position walled in by mountains on three sides, open only to the south, creating favorable conditions for fruit cultivation.
