= Poslovna Cona Žeje pri Komendi =

Poslovna Cona Žeje pri Komendi Poslovna cona Žeje pri Komendi
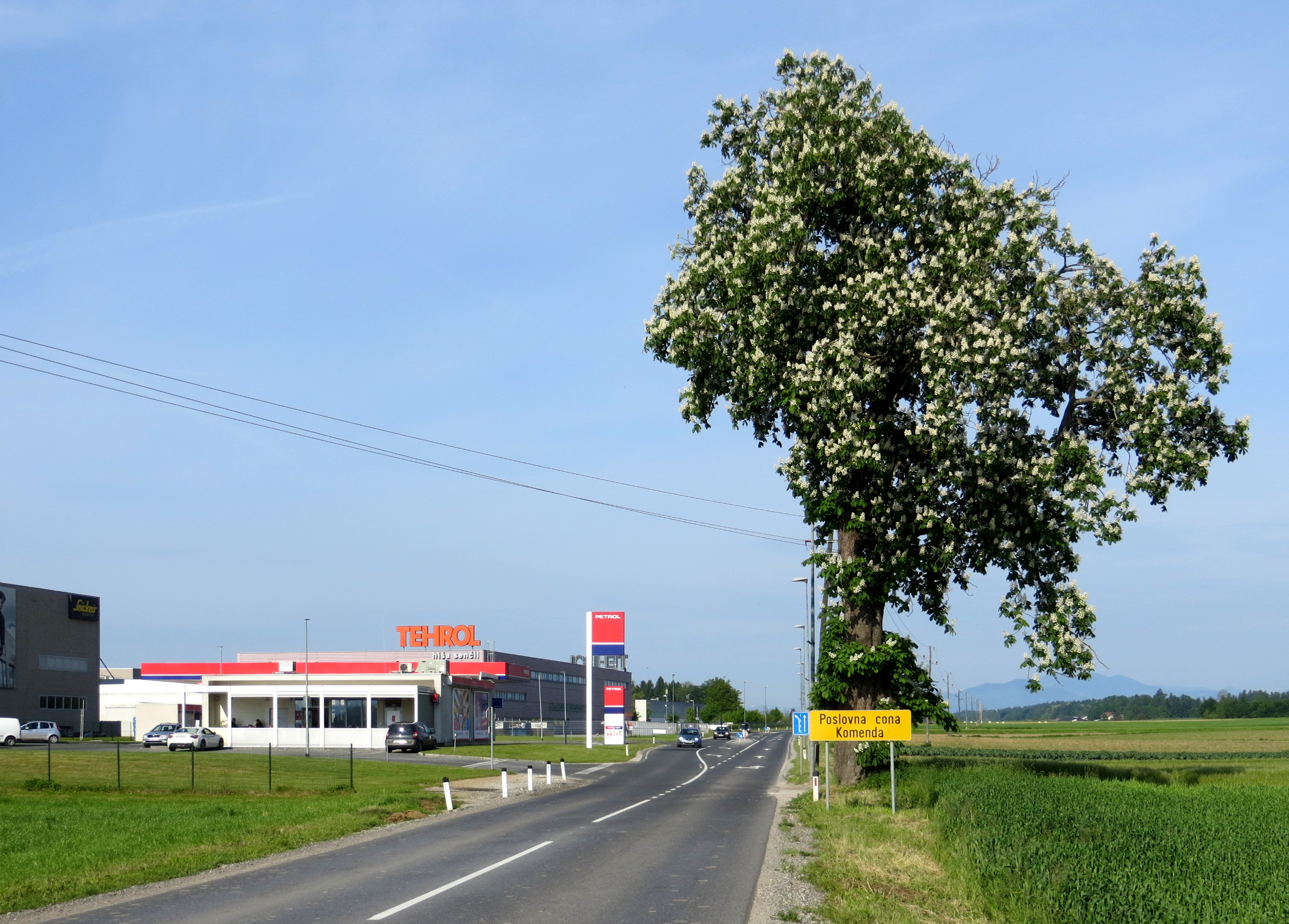

- Location in Slovenia
- Coordinates: 46°11′18.84″N 14°31′24.59″E
- Country: Slovenia
- Traditional region: Upper Carniola
- Statistical region: Central Slovenia
- Municipality: Komenda

Area
  - Total: 0.9 km^{2} (0.35 sq mi)

Population (2013)
  - Total: 0
- Postal code: 8340

Poslovna Cona Žeje pri Komendi (pronounced [pɔˈsloːu̯na ˈtsoːna ˈʒɛːjɛ pɾi kɔˈmɛːndi]; Slovene: Poslovna cona Žeje pri Komendi; literally, the "Žeje pri Komendi Industrial Zone") is an uninhabited settlement in the Municipality of Komenda in northern Slovenia. Until 2012, the area was part of the settlement of Žeje pri Komendi. The settlement is part of the traditional region of Upper Carniola and is included in the Central Slovenia Statistical Region.
