= Britannia Airways Flight 105 =

1966 aviation accident

Coordinates: 46.2080°N 14.5028°E

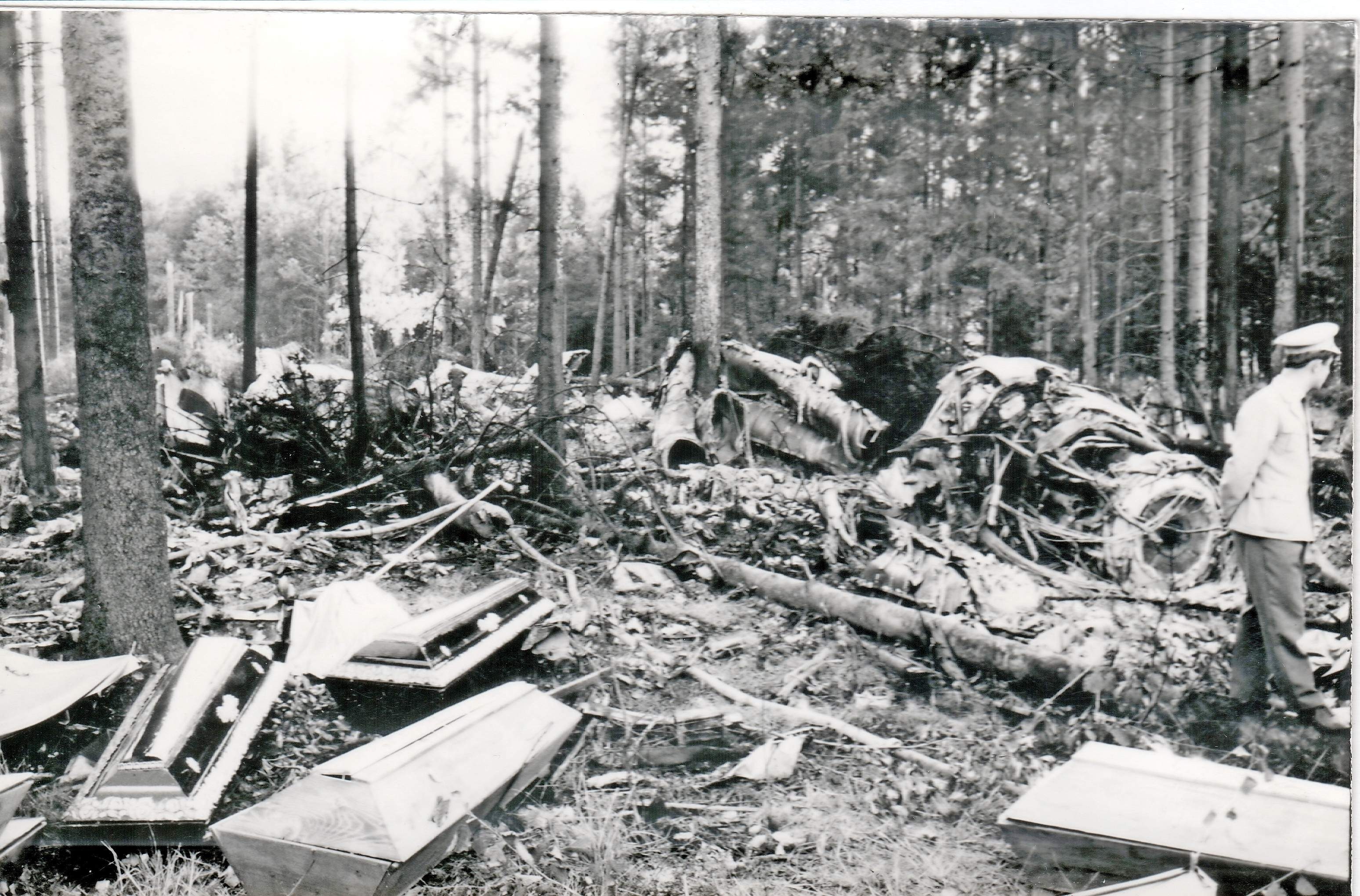
- Wreckage of Flight 105

Accident
- Date: 1 September 1966
- Summary: Controlled flight into terrain
- Site: 3 km (1.9 mls) SE of Brnik Airport, Yugoslavia (Note: Slovenia since 1991)

Aircraft
- A Britannia Airways Bristol 175 Britannia similar to the accident aircraft
- Aircraft type: Bristol 175 Britannia 102
- Operator: Britannia Airways
- Registration: G-ANBB
- Flight origin: London Luton Airport, United Kingdom
- Destination: Brnik Airport, Yugoslavia
- Passengers: 110
- Crew: 7
- Fatalities: 98
- Survivors: 19

Britannia Airways Flight 105 (BY 105) was an international tourist chartered flight from London Luton Airport for a flight to Ljubljana Brnik Airport (today Ljubljana Jože Pučnik Airport). Passengers were primarily British, most of them going to their vacation in Yugoslavia. The flight was operated by Bristol 175 Britannia 102 aircraft, registration code G-ANBB. The aircraft took off from Luton at 21:10 GMT on August 31, 1966, with 110 passengers and 7 crew on board. After an uneventful en route flight, radar contact was lost at 00:47 local time on September 1 (23:47 GMT on August 31) during the final approach to runway (RWY) 31. The aircraft struck trees in the woods in the village of Nasovče, 2.8 km south east of the RWY 31 threshold and 0.7 km north of the runway extended centreline, under Visual Meteorological Conditions (VMC). 98 of the 117 passengers and crew were killed in the accident.

The reason cited for the accident in the official report was a wrong setting of the altimeter.

With 98 fatalities this is the deadliest aircraft incident in Slovenia.

== Aircraft and crew ==
The Bristol 175 Britannia 102 was part of a series of aircraft produced for BOAC. It had a propulsion of 4 turboprop engines and was able to carry 139 passengers and crew. The aircraft involved in the accident was produced in 1954, serial number 12903, registration G-ANBB, and had a total of 18.444 airframe hours with 5.380 cycles. The aircraft was not equipped with a Flight Data Recorder since it was not mandatory at the time.

There are no publicly available details about the crew.

== Accident ==
After flying over Klagenfurt, the crew contacted Ljubljana Air Traffic Control (ATC). The ATC supplied the crew with meteorological and other necessary information: "Wind is calm, visibility 5 kilometres, shallow fog over the runway is forming now, clouds 2/8 stratocumulus 1800 metres, QNH 1011, QFE 968 millibars (mb). Temperature 10 and dew point also 10 degrees. Runway will be 31. After Dolsko make left pattern holding, descend down to 4500 by QNH, report inbound."

The crew acknowledged of having received the information. When the pilot asked ATC if the Instrument Landing System (ILS) was operating, the ATC answered he had a radar contact with the aircraft when positioned 20 NM southeast from the airport and advised the crew to make an ILS approach to RWY 31, and to report after descending to 4500 ft by QNH pressure.

The crew acknowledged, reported they were at 4500 ft and would call over Dolsko VOR inbound for the outer marker and asked again if the ILS was in service. The ATC answered affirmatively, adding that the ILS was working normally.

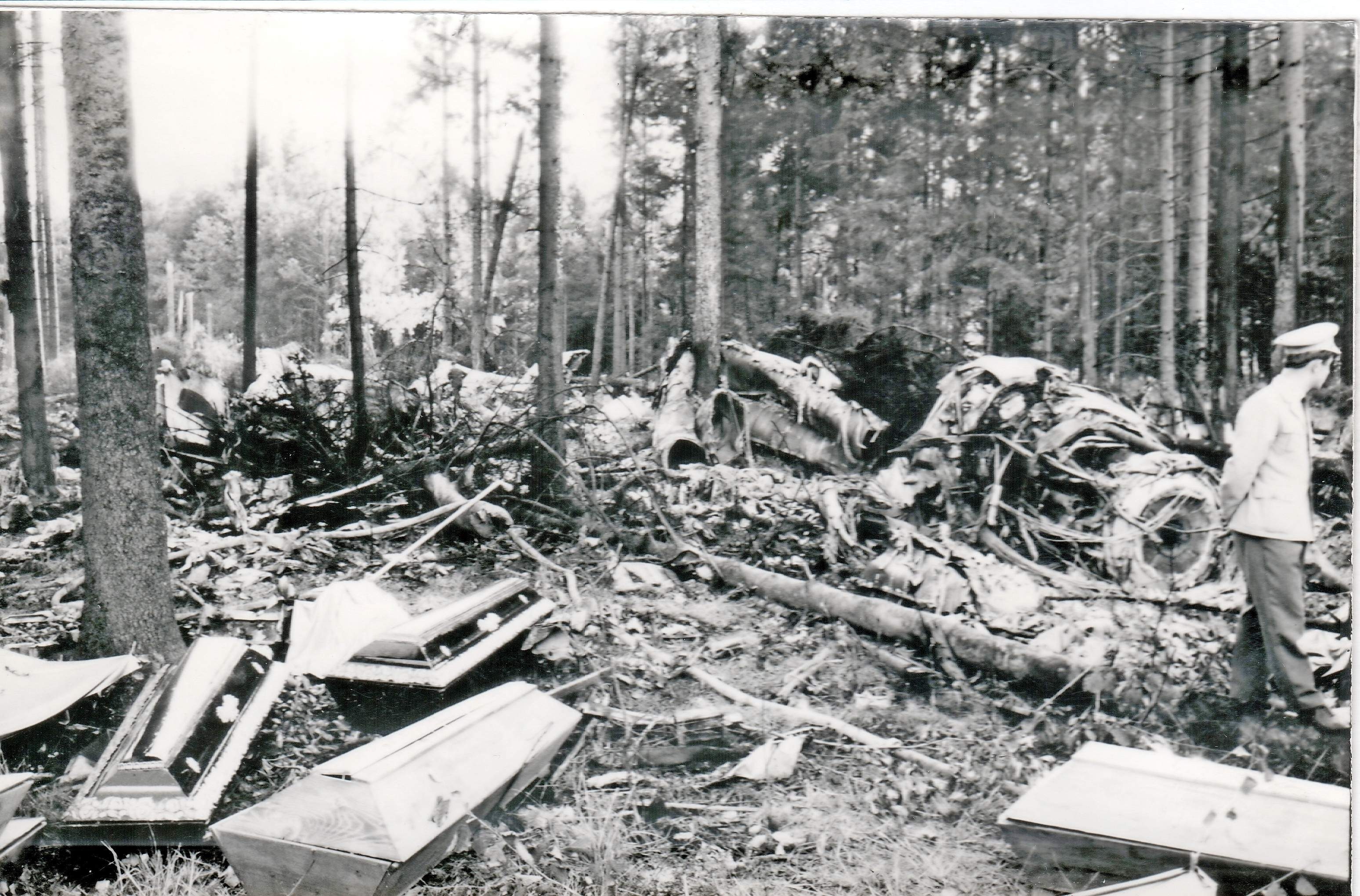
The wreckage of the aircraft

ATC then gave the position "abeam Dol" and after it was acknowledged by the crew, he asked if they had visual contact with the runway. The crew confirmed that they had visual contact. The crew then reported having passed Dolsko VOR, continuing and descending towards RWY 31. ATC acknowledged this information, requested the crew to "check final for runway 31", and gave the aircraft its position as 7 NM from touchdown on the centreline should be passing 3300 ft, and repeated "check final for runway 31". The crew acknowledged this message and 1:30 minutes later reported having passed the outer marker inbound. The ATC issued clearance for landing and advised that the approach and runway lights were set to maximum intensity. He then left the radar console and went to the light control console, at the same time glancing towards the approach and the runway. He could not see the aircraft, but the approach and runway lights were clearly visible. At that moment, the crew requested radar assistance. The ATC returned to the radar console and started to supply them with radar information. After giving the crew two aircraft positions of 3,5 NM and 2 NM from touchdown, he observed on the radar that the aircraft was deviating to the right from the approach glide path and instructed the crew to correct heading for 3° to the left. Observing that the aircraft did not make any correction, ATC informed the crew that its position was 1,5 NM from the touchdown, and asked the pilot whether he was making a short right turn to the radio beacon Menges. (Note: This doesn't make sense and a check is required. Mengeš Non-Directional Beacon (MG NDB) is at 4,2 NM from the RWY 31 threshold and was already passed). The crew did not reply, and no further contact with them was established despite the ATC continued to call. Radar contact was lost at 00:47 hours local time. Airport rescue services found burning aircraft's wreckage, around 01:00 hours local time, in the woods 2.8 km southeast of the RWY 31 threshold and 0.7 km to the right (northeast) of the runway's extended centreline.

== Aftermath ==
The Ljubljana University Medical Centre purchased a modern operating microscope, as a sign of gratitude to the Slovenian doctors that demonstrated altruism in saving the survivors. The same device with which Vinko Dolenc (1940-2025), a famous Slovenian neurosurgeon, trained in microsurgery and in 1967 began suturing nerves, an operation that was revolutionary for that time.

=== Memorials ===
Subsequently, a monument to the victims was erected in the place where the accident occurred, monument that over time and years was highly neglected and hidden by vegetation. In 2016, year in which the 50th anniversary of the accident was celebrated, Ljubljana Airport had built a new one.

== Conclusions ==
Official report stated the probable cause of the accident to be the pilot-in-command missing to set his altimeter to the QFE 968 mb in accordance with the information passed by the ATC. The difference between the QNH (1011 mb) and QFE (968 mb) pressures passed to the aircraft by the ATC, correlates to the altitude difference of approx. 1100 ft. The co-pilot's altimeter was found set at 1005,5 mb which is neither of the two pressure values instructed by the ATC. (The whole approach to the airport was made as if the altimeter had been set to the QNH, and resulted in the approach being about 1100 ft lower than procedural safety altitudes, making the approach too low. - this sentence to be checked)

As the altimeter error passed unnoticed by both pilots and because they were not carrying out cross-checks of the two altimeters, in accordance with the relevant operations manual instruction attachment No. 15, the error was not corrected. Although it was a moonlit night, due to the forest terrain over which they were flying, the crew could not distinguish any visual landmark which might have warned them they were flying low.

It is possible that an optical illusion contributed to the crash as well. The plane was approaching the runway from the southeast, heading 310. The runway is positioned on a gentle slope rising towards the northwest. If the crew was relying on visual cues, which seems highly probable, they could have misjudged the angle of their approach. Combined with the false altitude readings and dark forest below, the illusion would have given the impression of being higher than they were. If the pilots ever noticed their mistake, it was too late to save the aircraft. Their disregard of the check list procedures and operations manual for approach and landing may be explained by the fact that the final approach was carried out on a moonlit night, in calm weather, with visibility of approx. 12 NM, which reduced the crew's focus on following prescribed procedures and, instead, focusing on a visual approach.
