= Kaplja Vas =

Kaplja Vas (Slovene: Kaplja vas) may refer to

- Kaplja Vas, Komenda, a former village in northern Slovenia
- Kaplja Vas, Prebold, a village in the Municipality of Prebold, eastern Slovenia
- Kaplja Vas, Sevnica, a village in the Municipality of Sevnica, southeastern Slovenia
