= Potok pri Komendi =

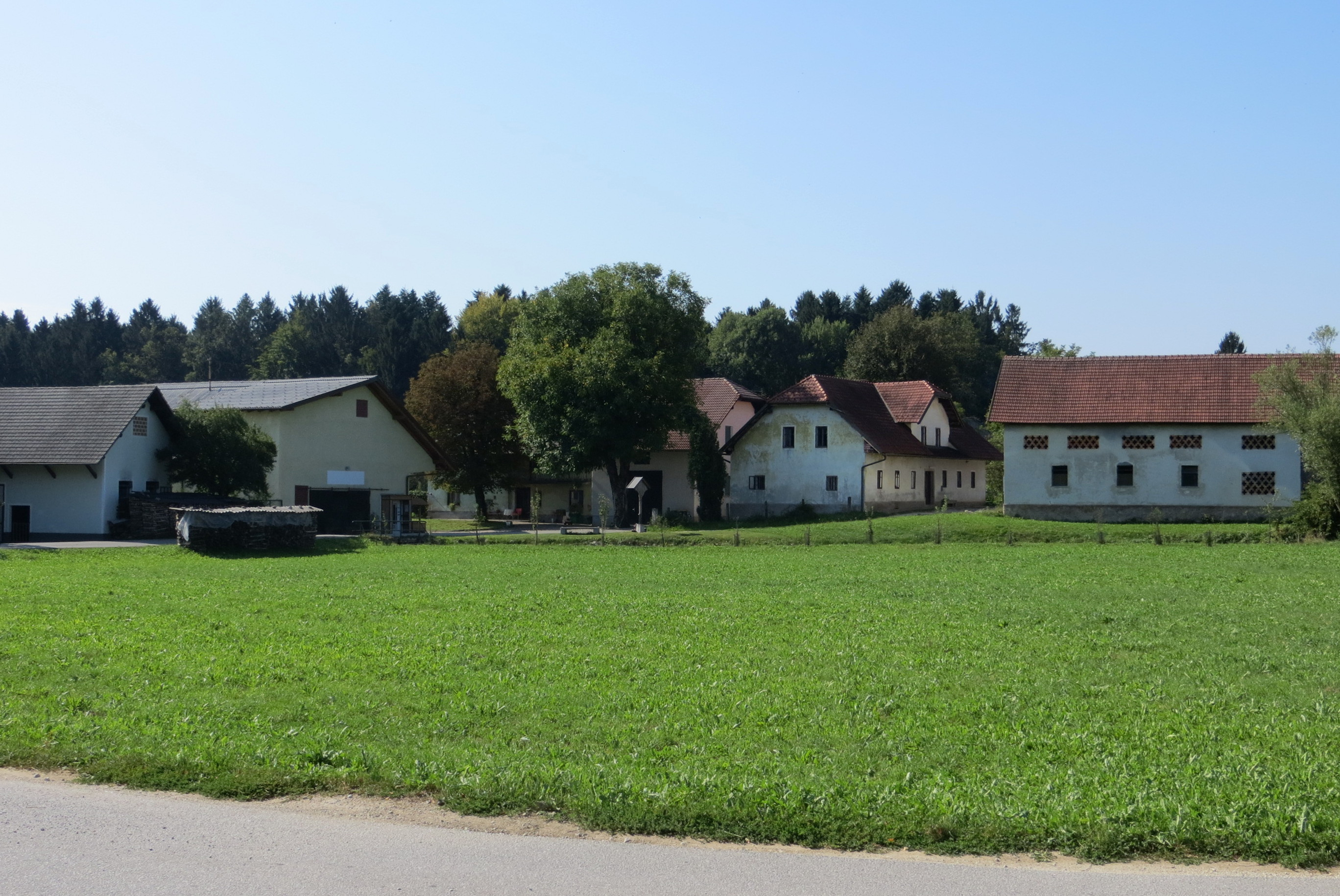

- Location in Slovenia
- Coordinates: 46°12′27.34″N 14°31′41.35″E
- Country: Slovenia
- Traditional region: Upper Carniola
- Statistical region: Central Slovenia
- Municipality: Komenda

Area
  - Total: 0.45 km^{2} (0.17 sq mi)
- Elevation: 345.6 m (1,134 ft)

Population (2002)
  - Total: 44

Potok pri Komendi (pronounced [ˈpɔːtɔk pɾi kɔˈmɛːndi]) is a small settlement next to Komenda in the Upper Carniola region of Slovenia.

== Name ==
The name of the settlement was changed from Potok to Potok pri Komendi in 1955.
