= Komendska Dobrava =

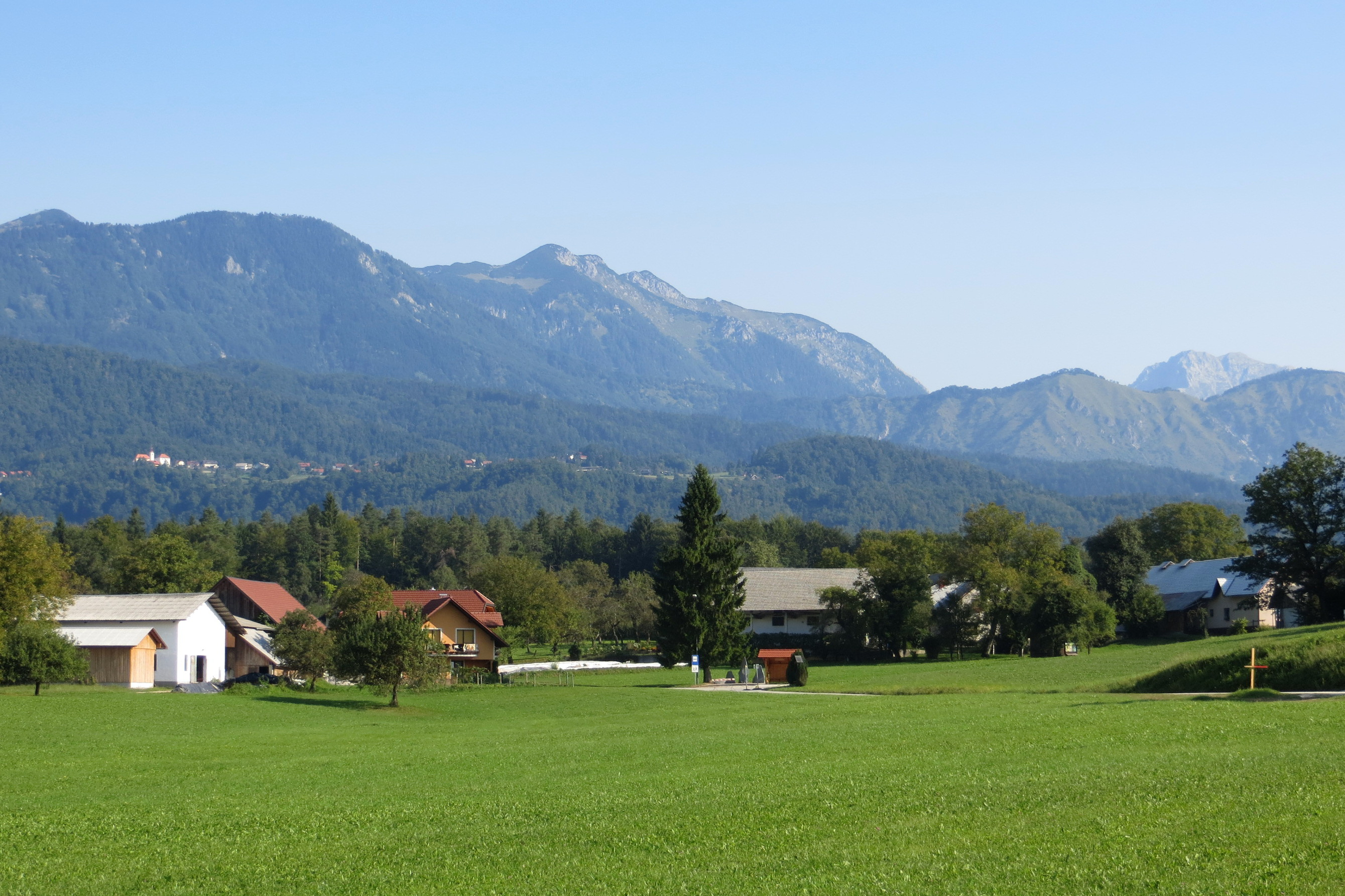

- Location in Slovenia
- Coordinates: 46°13′51.17″N 14°32′45.51″E
- Country: Slovenia
- Traditional region: Upper Carniola
- Statistical region: Central Slovenia
- Municipality: Komenda

Area
  - Total: 2.82 km^{2} (1.09 sq mi)
- Elevation: 374.3 m (1,228 ft)

Population (2002)
  - Total: 56

Komendska Dobrava (pronounced [kɔˈmɛːndska dɔˈbɾaːʋa]; German: Dobrawa) is a dispersed settlement in the hills north of Komenda in the Upper Carniola region of Slovenia.

== History ==
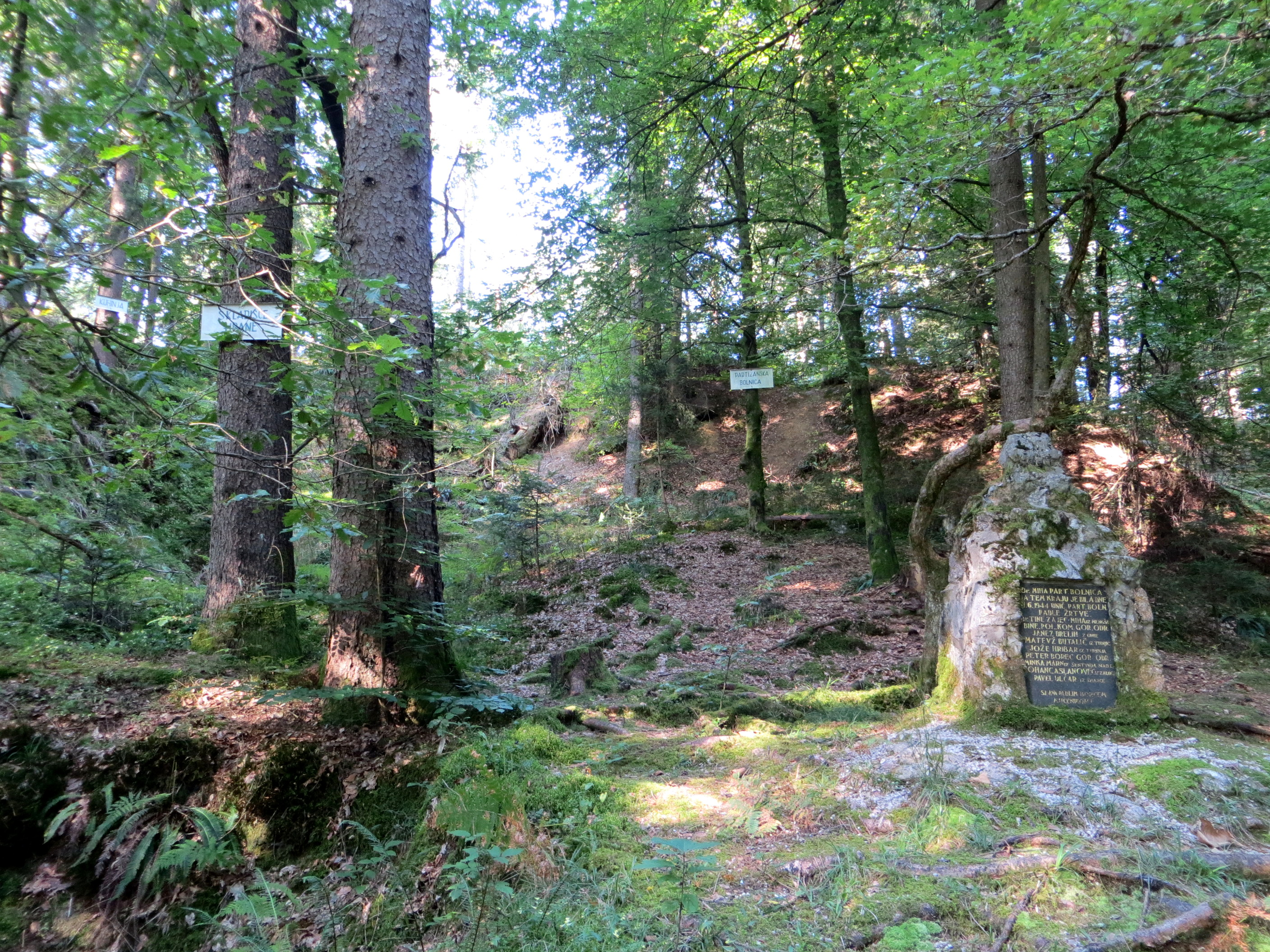
Partisan hospital site

During the Second World War, a Partisan hospital was set up in April 1944 in a gorge south of the village in the Komenda Woods (Slovene: Komendski boršt). It operated until June 11, 1944, when it was discovered by German forces, who killed the patients and the medical personnel at the facility, including two nurses and the physician, Tine Zajec (1905–1944).
