= Gora pri Komendi =

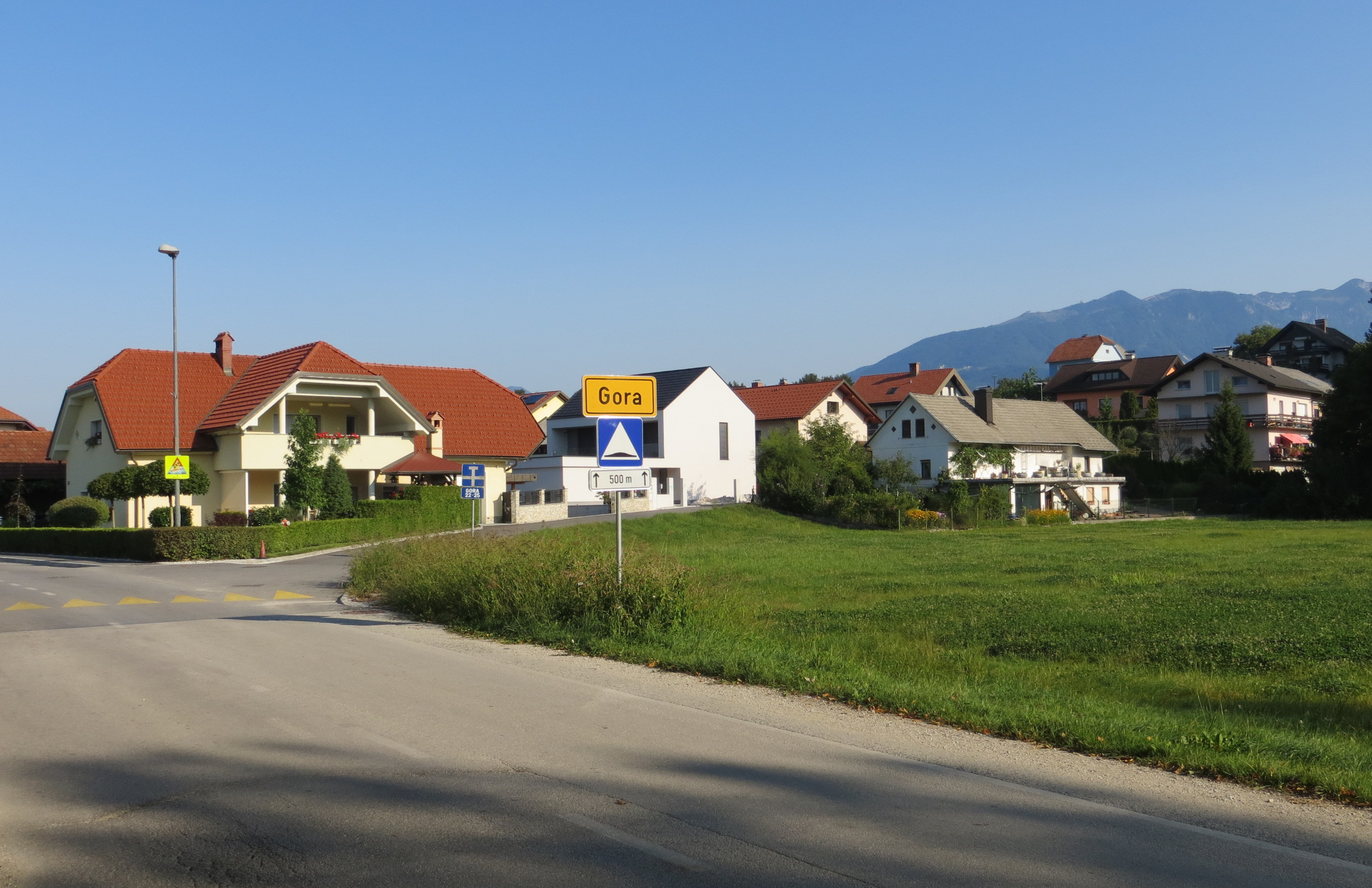

- Location in Slovenia
- Coordinates: 46°12′23.77″N 14°33′0.69″E
- Country: Slovenia
- Traditional region: Upper Carniola
- Statistical region: Central Slovenia
- Municipality: Komenda

Area
  - Total: 1.55 km^{2} (0.60 sq mi)
- Elevation: 355 m (1,165 ft)

Population (2002)
  - Total: 231

Gora pri Komendi (pronounced [ˈɡɔːɾa pɾi kɔˈmɛːndi]) is a settlement east of Komenda in the Upper Carniola region of Slovenia.

The Slovene writer and editor Ivo Zorman was born in the village in 1926.

== Name ==
The name of the settlement was changed from Gora to Gora pri Komendi in 1955.
