= Breg pri Komendi =

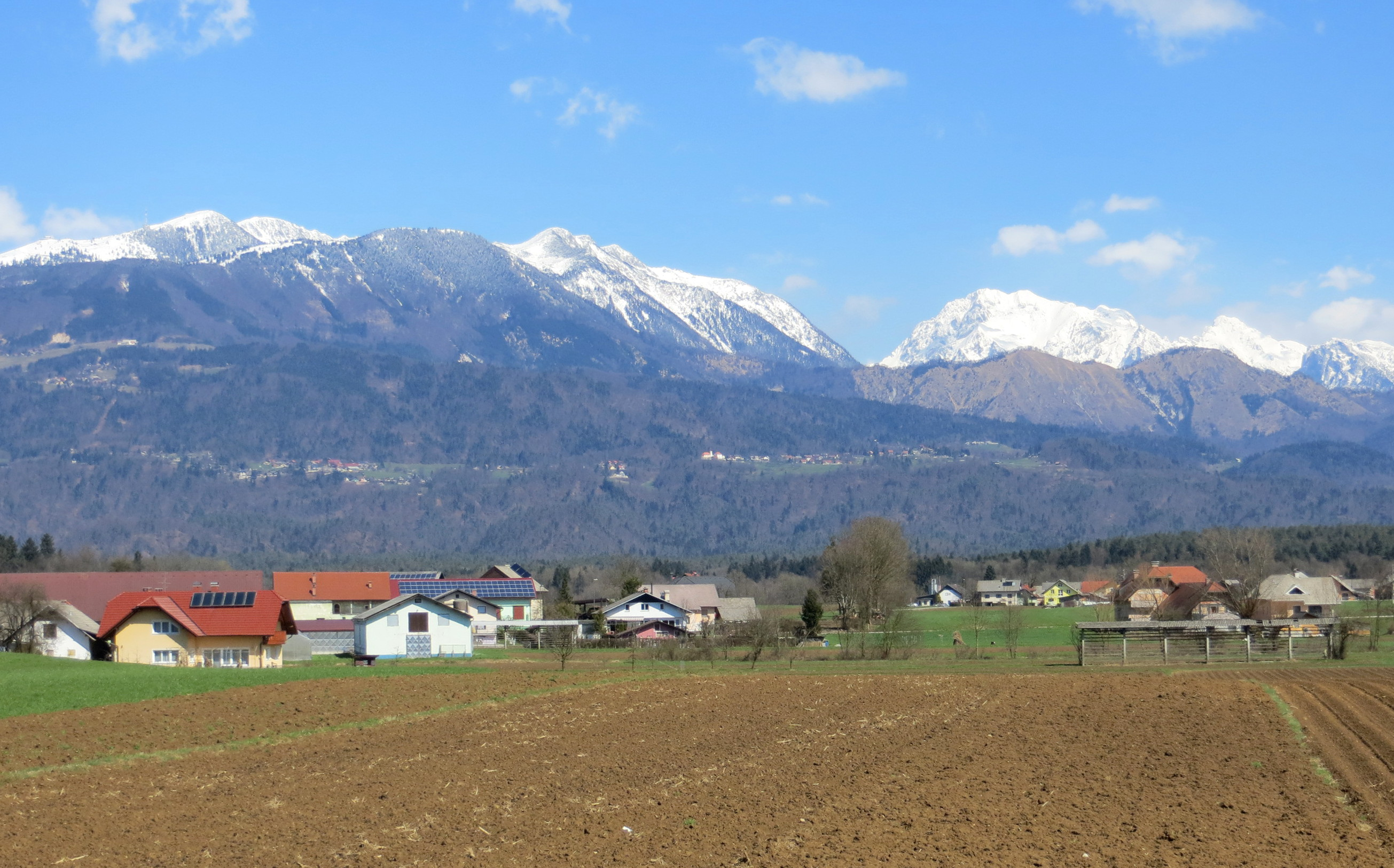

- Location in Slovenia
- Coordinates: 46°12′38.58″N 14°31′18.86″E
- Country: Slovenia
- Traditional region: Upper Carniola
- Statistical region: Central Slovenia
- Municipality: Komenda

Area
  - Total: 1.35 km^{2} (0.52 sq mi)
- Elevation: 346 m (1,135 ft)

Population (2002)
  - Total: 128

Breg pri Komendi (pronounced [ˈbɾeːk pɾi kɔˈmɛːndi]) is a small settlement in the Municipality of Komenda in the Upper Carniola region of Slovenia.

== Name ==
The name of the settlement was changed from Breg to Breg pri Komendi in 1955.
