= Križ, Komenda =

Križ
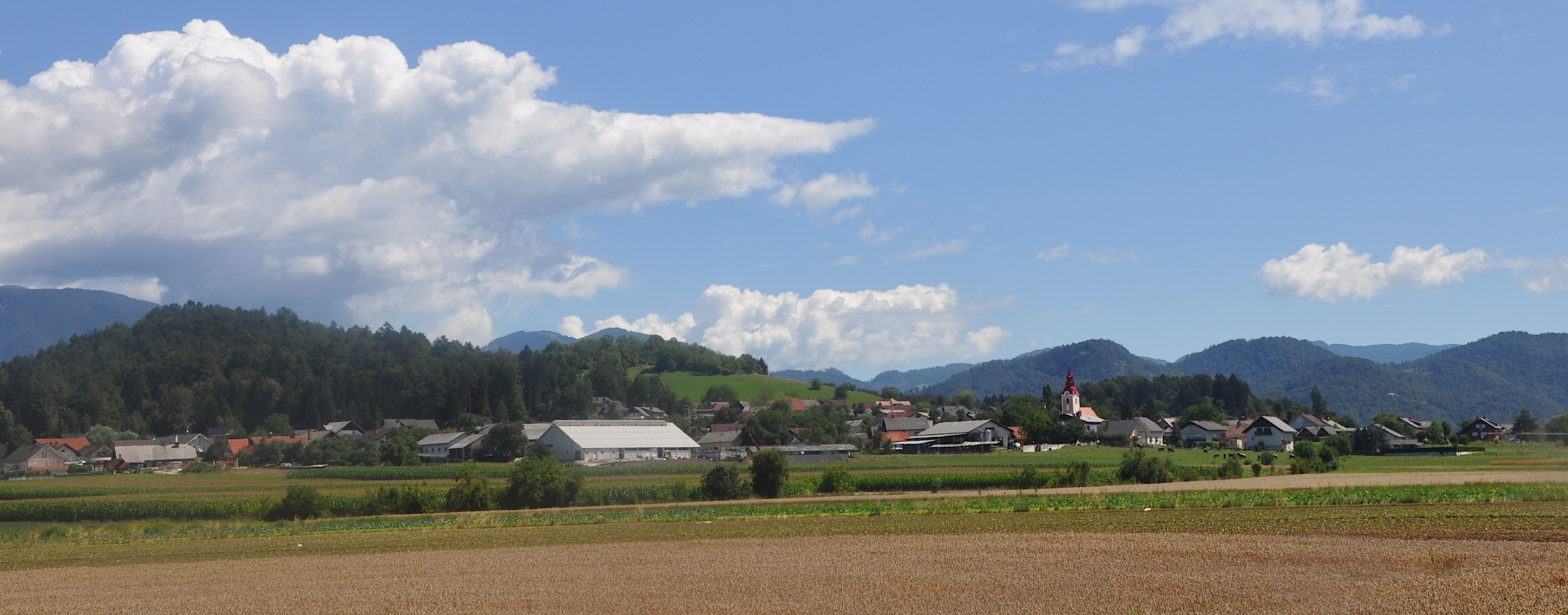

- Location in Slovenia
- Coordinates: 46°11′56.44″N 14°33′54.09″E
- Country: Slovenia
- Traditional region: Upper Carniola
- Statistical region: Central Slovenia
- Municipality: Komenda

Area
  - Total: 2.29 km^{2} (0.88 sq mi)
- Elevation: 349.8 m (1,148 ft)

Population (2002)
  - Total: 447

Križ (pronounced [ˈkɾiːʃ]; German: Kreuz) is a village in the Municipality of Komenda in the Upper Carniola region of Slovenia.

== Castle ==
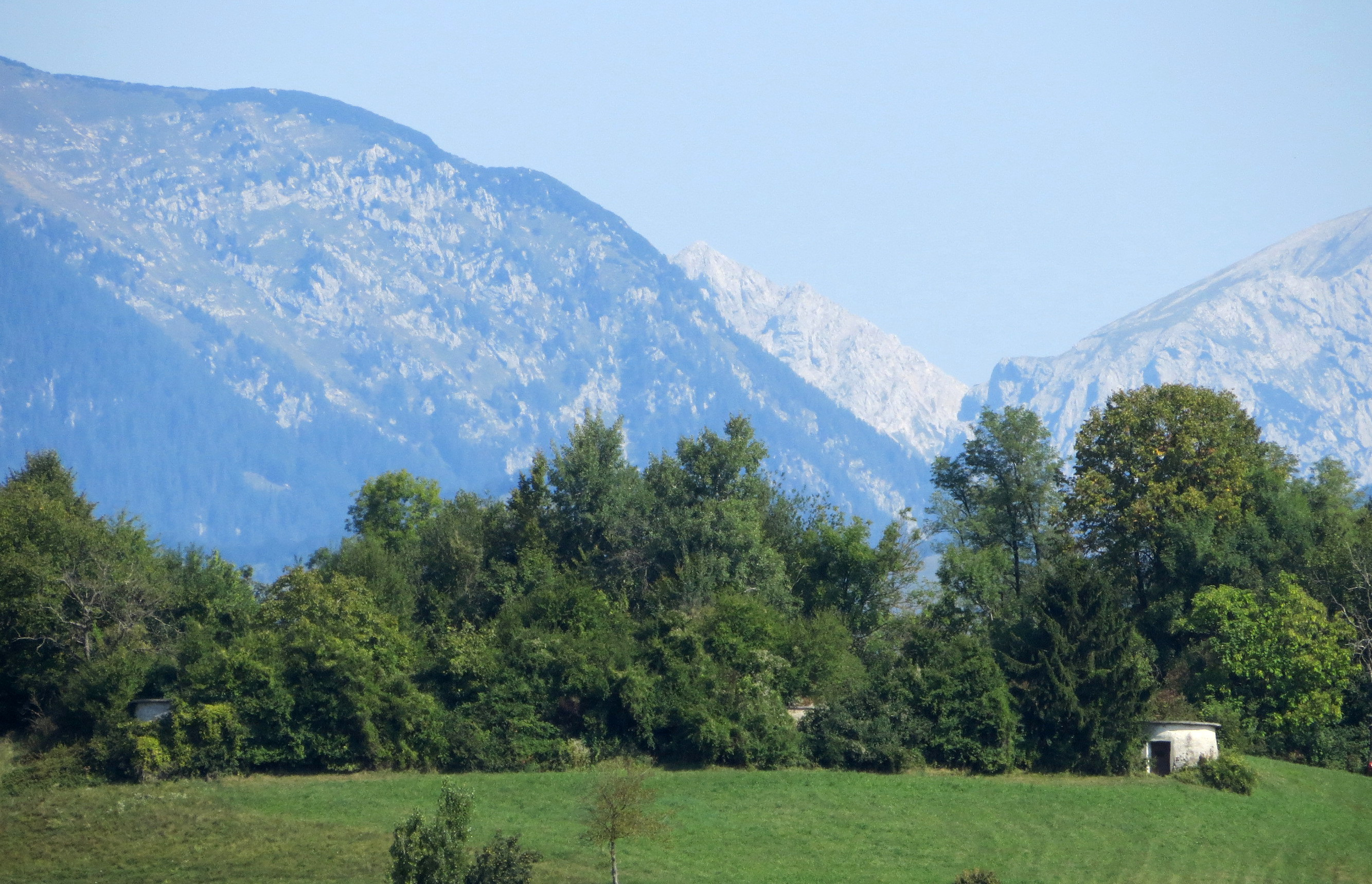
Former site of Križ Castle

Križ Castle (Slovene: grad Križ) or Križ Manor (Slovene: Kriška graščina) used to stand on a small hill above the settlement. It was built in the second half of the 16th century. In 1918, Križ Castle was owned by the Austrian aristocrat Baron Otto von Apfaltrern. The castle was burned down and demolished by the Partisans in November 1943. It contained many valuable works of art; some were burned by the Partisans and others were looted.

== Church ==
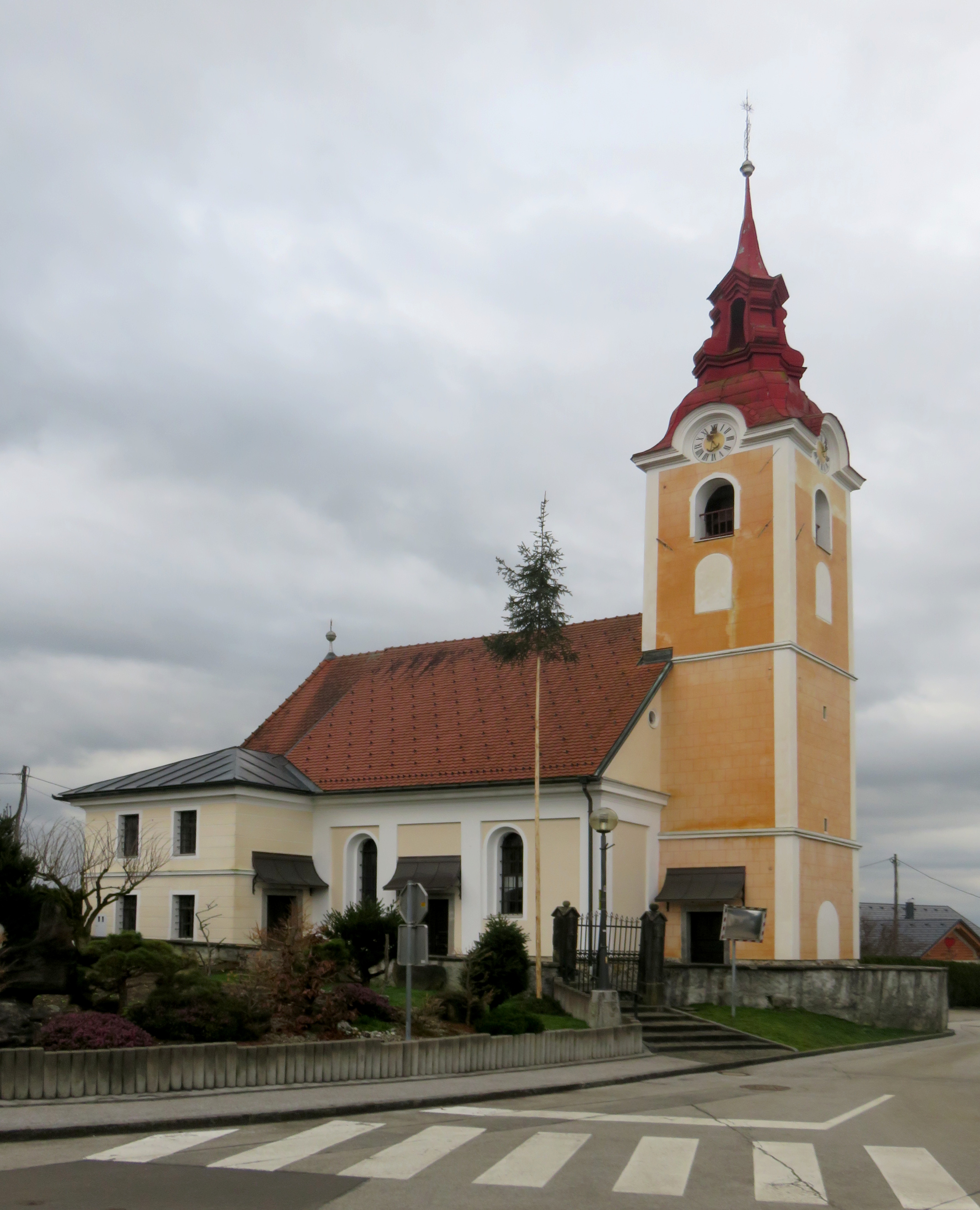
Saint Paul's Church

The local church is dedicated to Saint Paul.
