= Nasovče =

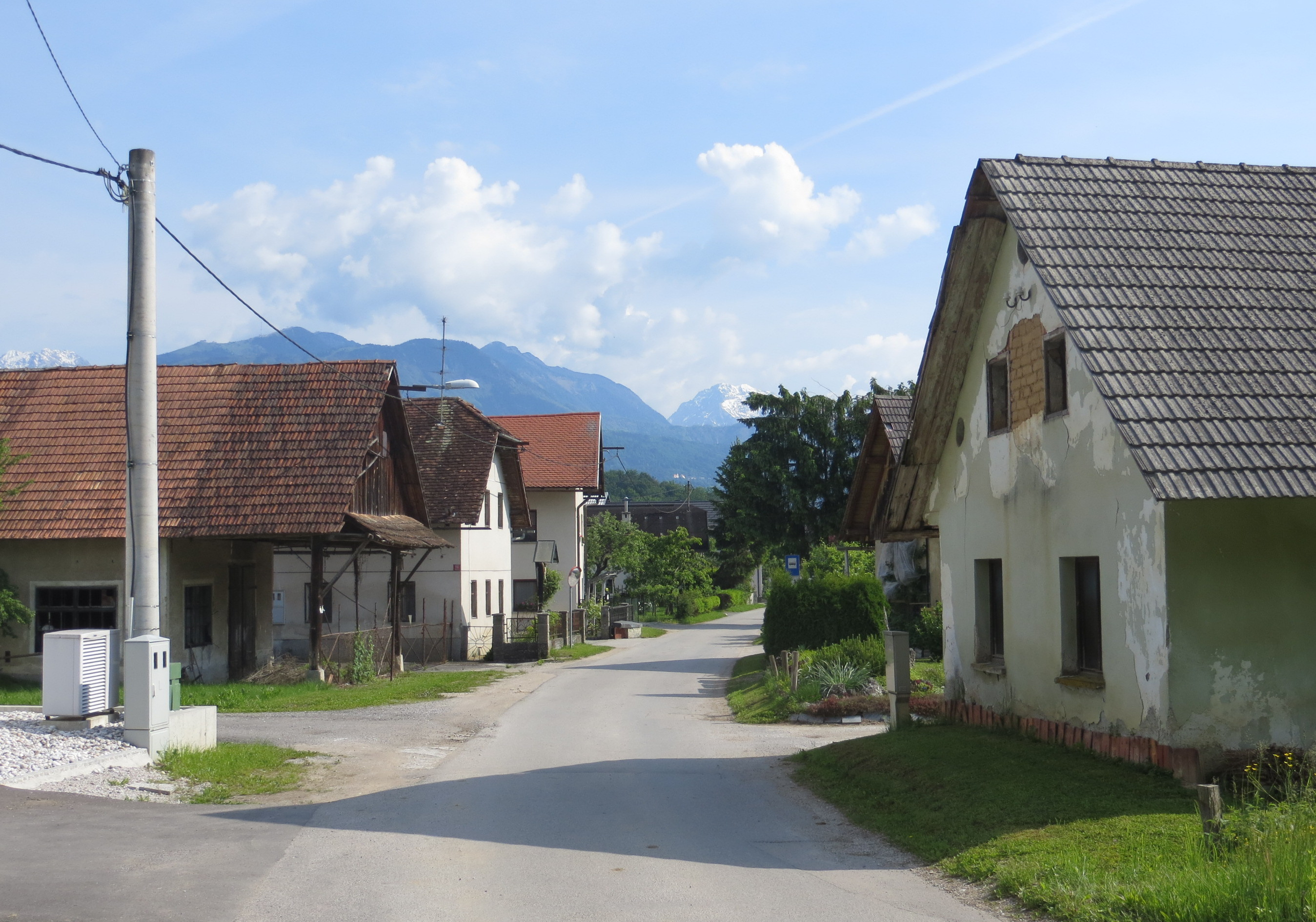

- Location in Slovenia
- Coordinates: 46°12′35.24″N 14°30′54.63″E
- Country: Slovenia
- Traditional region: Upper Carniola
- Statistical region: Central Slovenia
- Municipality: Komenda

Area
  - Total: 1.33 km^{2} (0.51 sq mi)
- Elevation: 349.5 m (1,147 ft)

Population (2002)
  - Total: 194

Nasovče (pronounced [ˈnaːsɔu̯tʃɛ]; in older sources also Nasoviče, German: Nassowitsch) is a small village west of Komenda in the Upper Carniola region of Slovenia.
