= Municipality of Komenda =

Municipality of Slovenia

Municipality of Komenda Občina Komenda
- Municipality
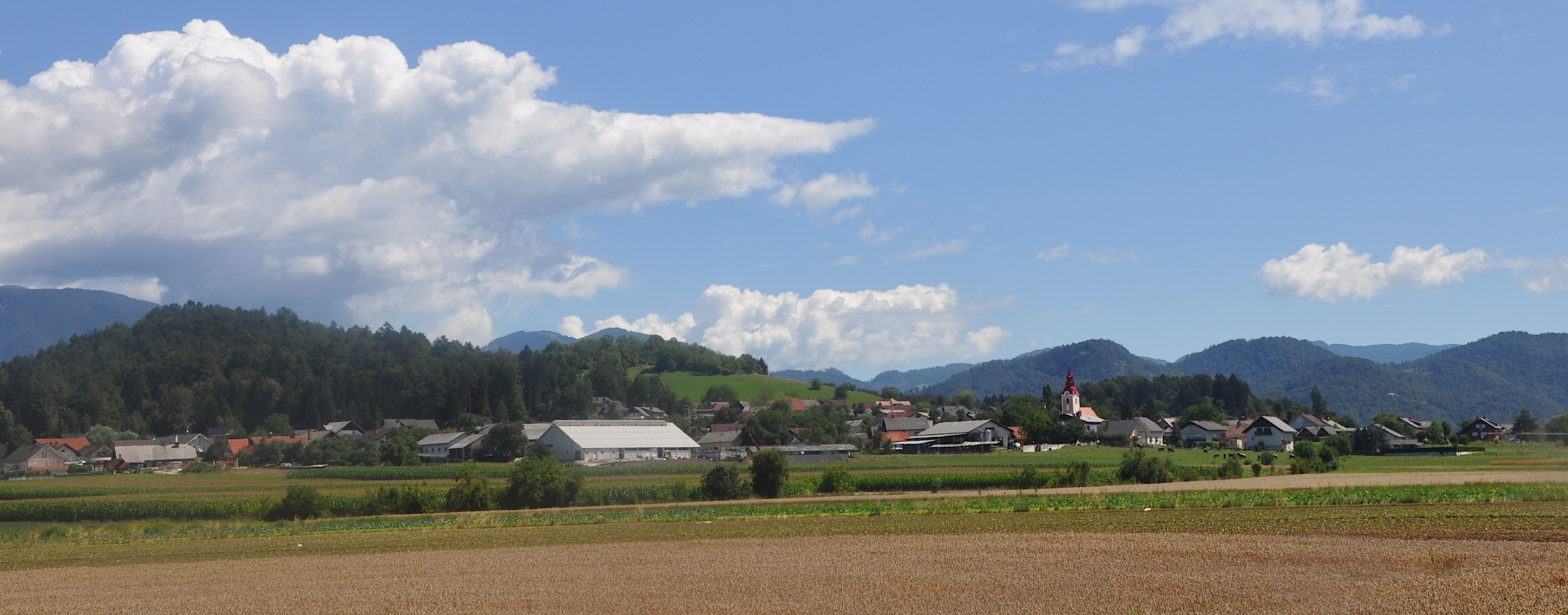

- Location of the Municipality of Komenda in Slovenia
- Coordinates: 46°12′N 14°32′E
- Country: Slovenia
- First mention: 1147

Government
  - Mayor: Jurij Kern (Independent)

Area
  - Total: 24.0 km^{2} (9.3 sq mi)
- Elevation: 346.8 m (1,138 ft)

Population (2013)
  - Total: 5,788
  - Density: 241/km^{2} (625/sq mi)
- Time zone: UTC+01 (CET)
  - Summer (DST): UTC+02 (CEST)
- Area code: 01
- Website: www.komenda.si

The Municipality of Komenda (pronounced [kɔˈmɛːnda]; Slovene: Občina Komenda) is a municipality in the Upper Carniola region of Slovenia. The seat of the municipality is the village of Komenda.

== Settlements ==
In addition to the municipal seat of Komenda, the municipality also includes the following settlements:

- Breg pri Komendi
- Gmajnica
- Gora pri Komendi
- Klanec
- Komendska Dobrava
- Križ
- Mlaka
- Moste
- Nasovče
- Podboršt pri Komendi
- Poslovna Cona Žeje pri Komendi
- Potok pri Komendi
- Suhadole
- Žeje pri Komendi

== Twin municipalities ==
- Municipality of Križevci, northeastern Slovenia
