= Mlaka, Komenda =

Mlaka
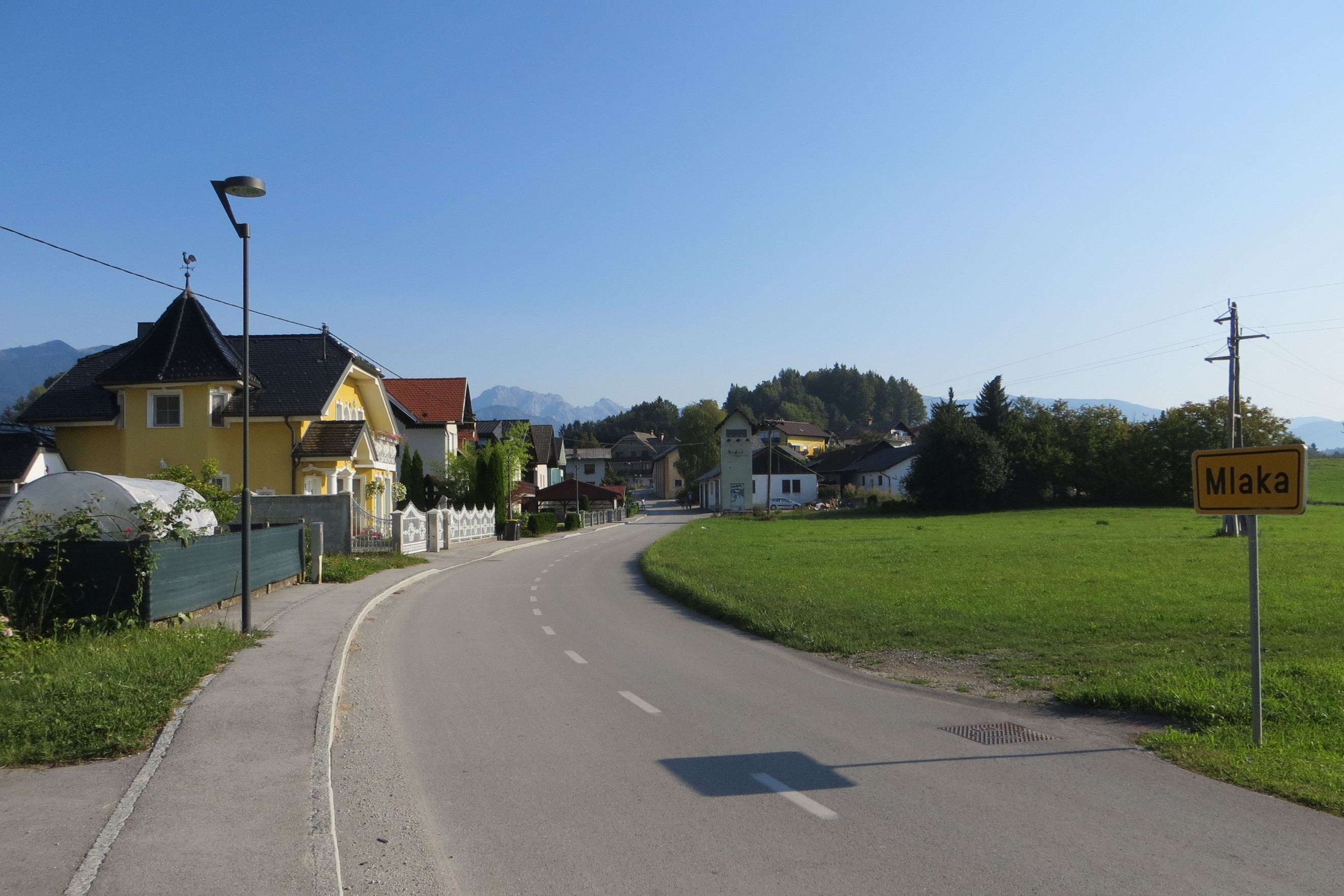

- Location in Slovenia
- Coordinates: 46°12′43.53″N 14°33′1″E
- Country: Slovenia
- Traditional region: Upper Carniola
- Statistical region: Central Slovenia
- Municipality: Komenda

Area
  - Total: 1.27 km^{2} (0.49 sq mi)
- Elevation: 361.9 m (1,187 ft)

Population (2002)
  - Total: 275

Mlaka (pronounced [ˈmlaːka]) is a settlement in the Municipality of Komenda in the Upper Carniola region of Slovenia.
