= Moste, Komenda =

Moste
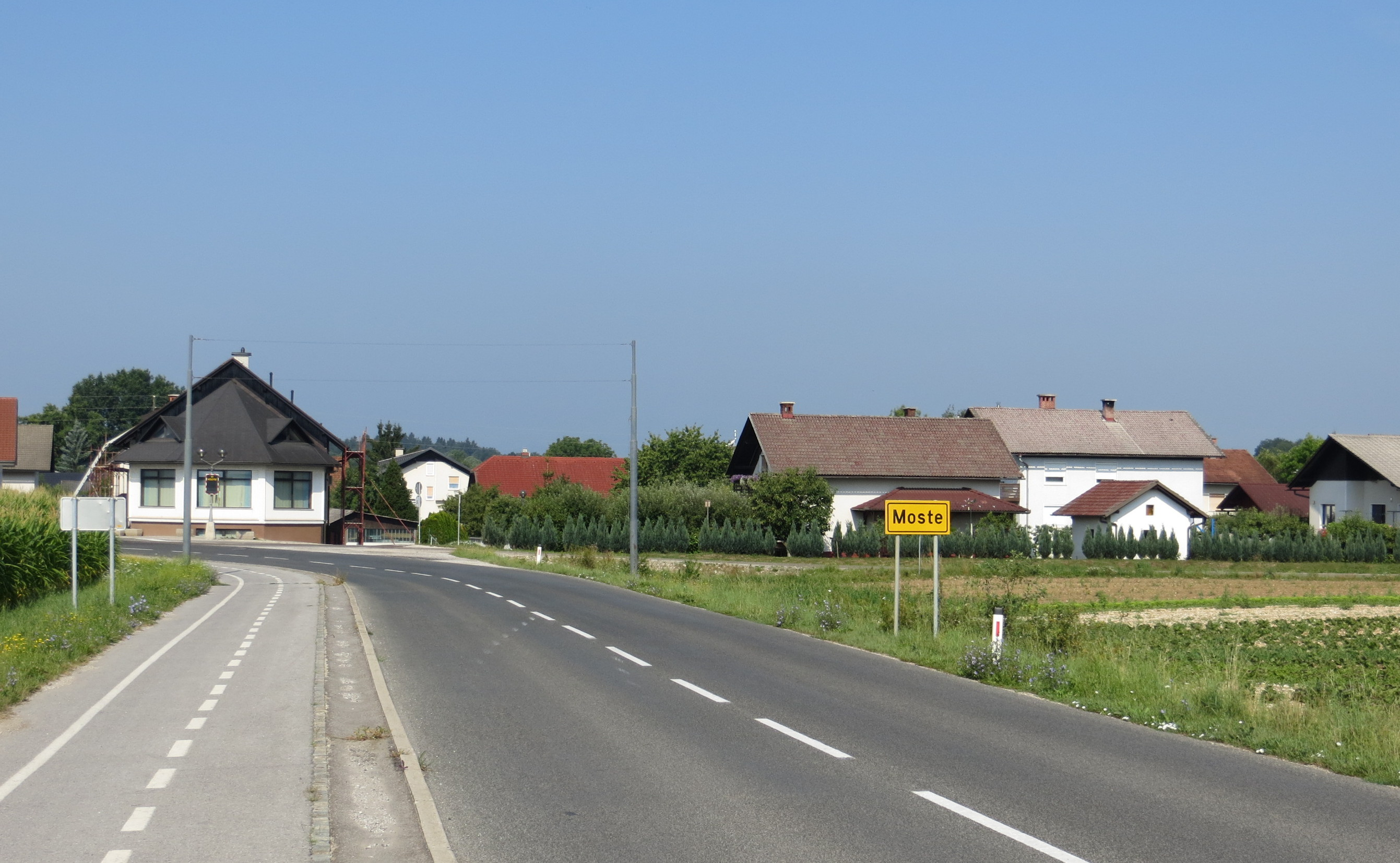

- Location in Slovenia
- Coordinates: 46°11′34.84″N 14°32′55.49″E
- Country: Slovenia
- Traditional region: Upper Carniola
- Statistical region: Central Slovenia
- Municipality: Komenda

Area
  - Total: 1.63 km^{2} (0.63 sq mi)
- Elevation: 330.9 m (1,086 ft)

Population (2002)
  - Total: 775

Moste (pronounced [ˈmoːstɛ]) is a settlement in the Municipality of Komenda in the Upper Carniola region of Slovenia.

== Church ==
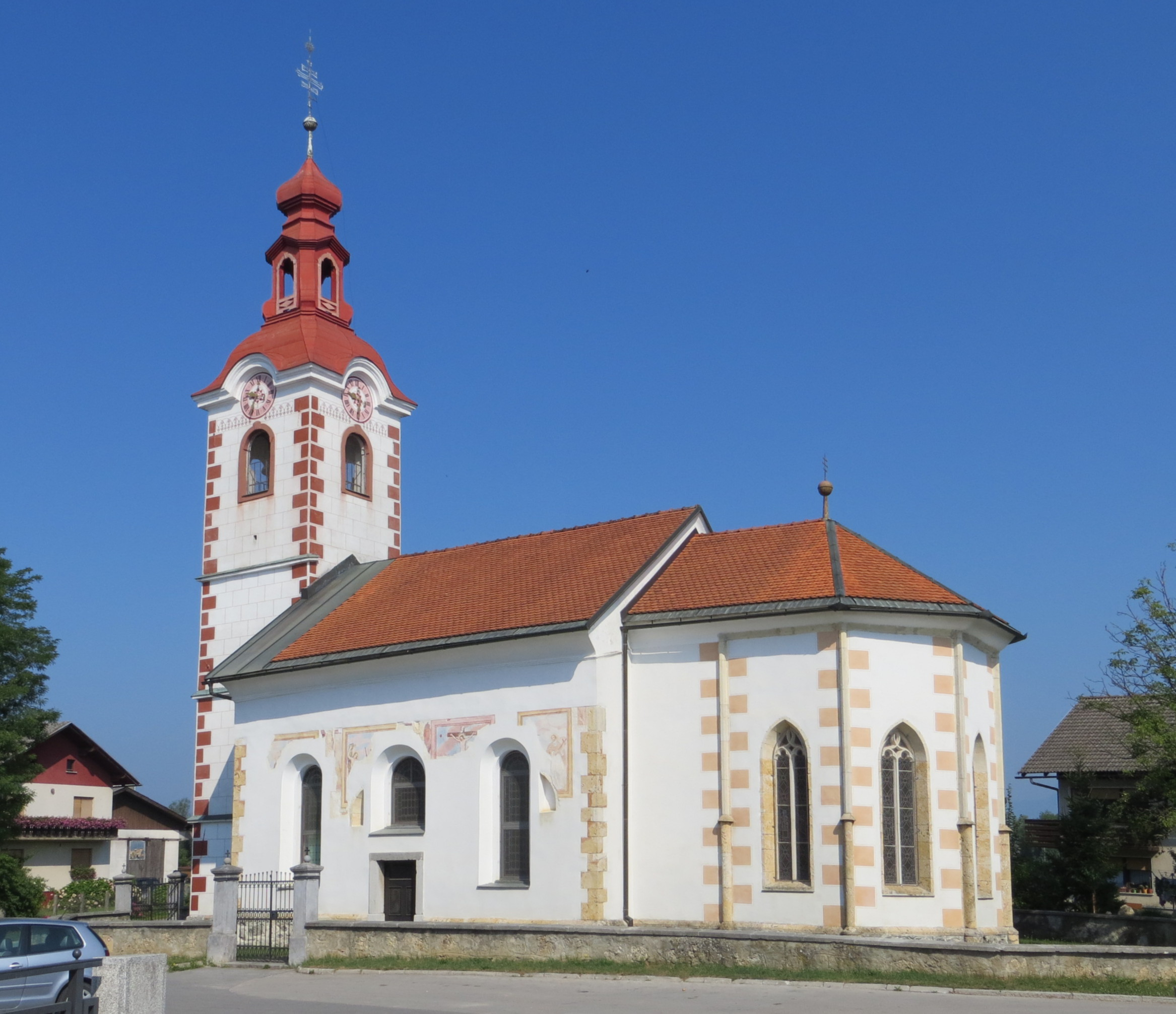
Saint Sebastian's Church

The local church is dedicated to Saint Sebastian. It was severely damaged in the 1895 Ljubljana earthquake and was entirely repaired and repainted. More recently, restoration work was again undertaken between 1995 and 1996, when new stained glass windows were added.
