= Žeje pri Komendi =

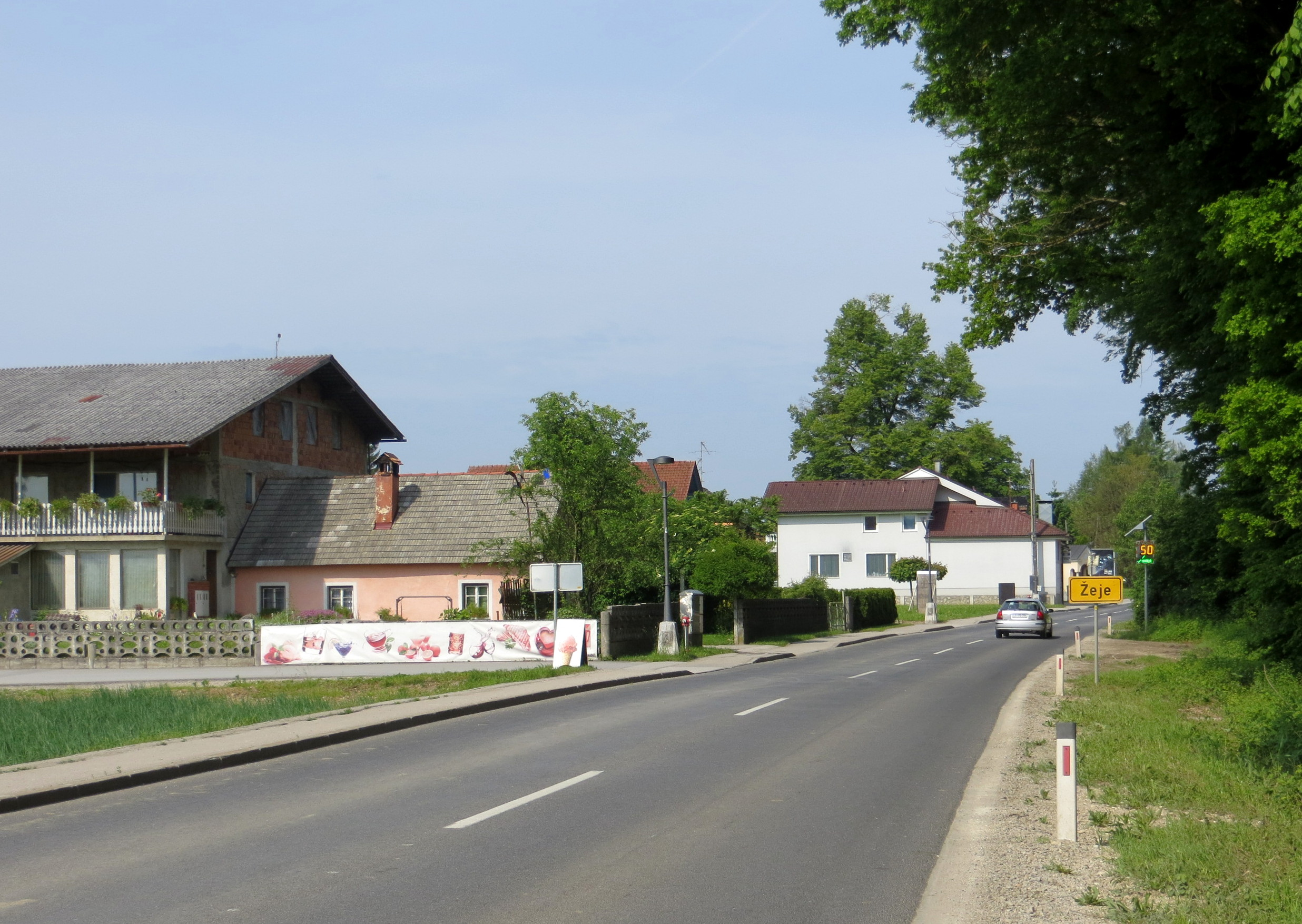

- Location in Slovenia
- Coordinates: 46°11′33.36″N 14°32′9.79″E
- Country: Slovenia
- Traditional region: Upper Carniola
- Statistical region: Central Slovenia
- Municipality: Komenda
- Elevation: 333.2 m (1,093 ft)

Population (2002)
  - Total: 141

Žeje pri Komendi (pronounced [ˈʒɛːjɛ pɾi kɔˈmɛːndi] or [ˈʒeːjɛ pɾi kɔˈmɛːndi]; German: Scheje) is a village in the Municipality of Komenda in the Upper Carniola region of Slovenia.

== Name ==
The name of the settlement was changed from Žeje to Žeje pri Komendi in 1955. The name was first attested in written sources in 1322 as Seyach (and as Seach in 1348). The name is derived from the plural demonym *Žežane, from the verb *žeťi 'to burn'. The change *Žež- > *Žej- is a result of dissimilation. The name refers to people living on burned-over ground. A second possibility is that the name may be derived from some unknown noun related to Slovene žeja 'thirst', referring to an intermittent spring or dry soil. The settlement was known as Scheje in German in the past.

== History ==
Roman-era brick has been found near the village, testifying to its settlement in antiquity. A village band was established in Žeje pri Komendi in the mid-18th century, conducted by the composer Jakob Suppan (1734–1810). A water main was installed in 1961.

=== Mass graves ===
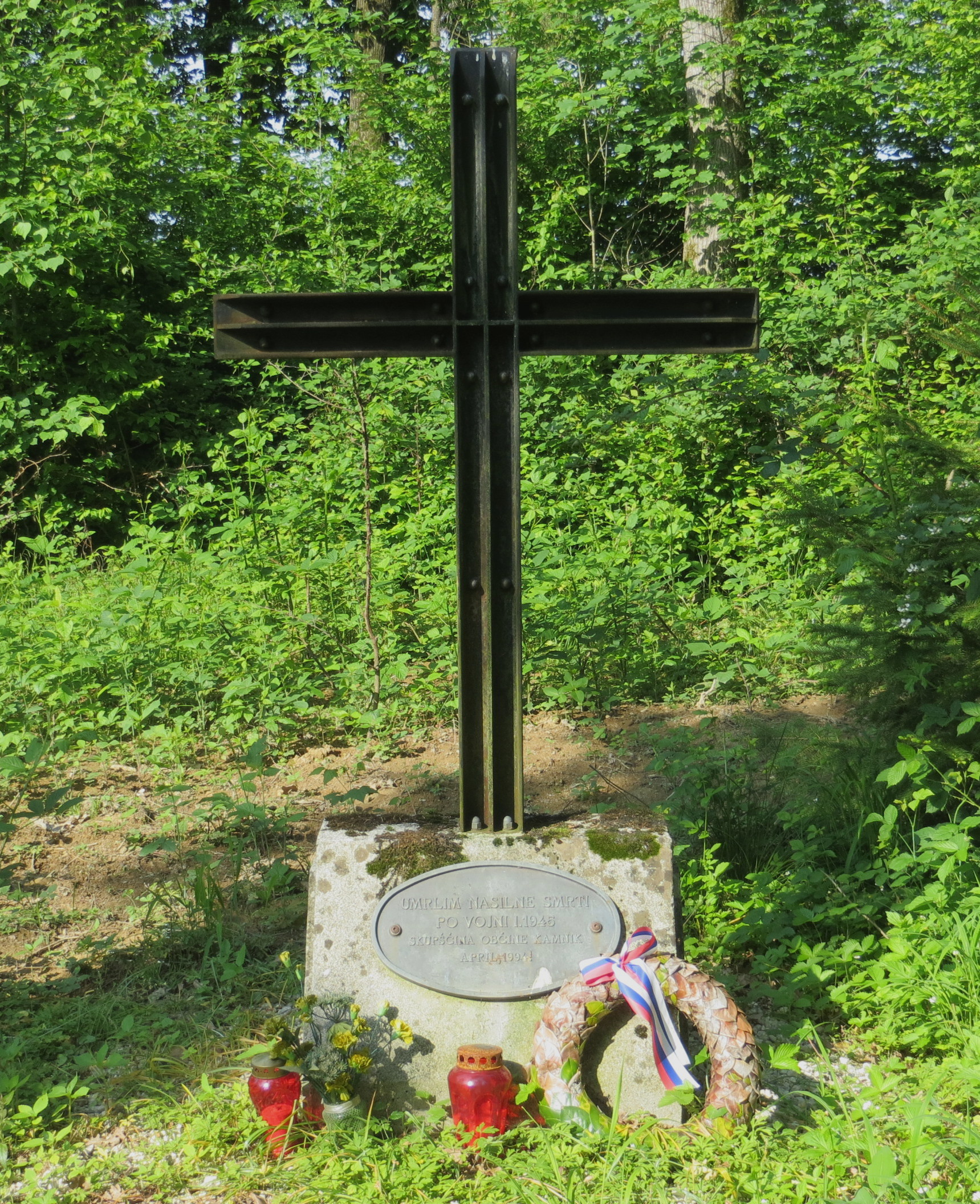
Kuhar Woods Mass Grave

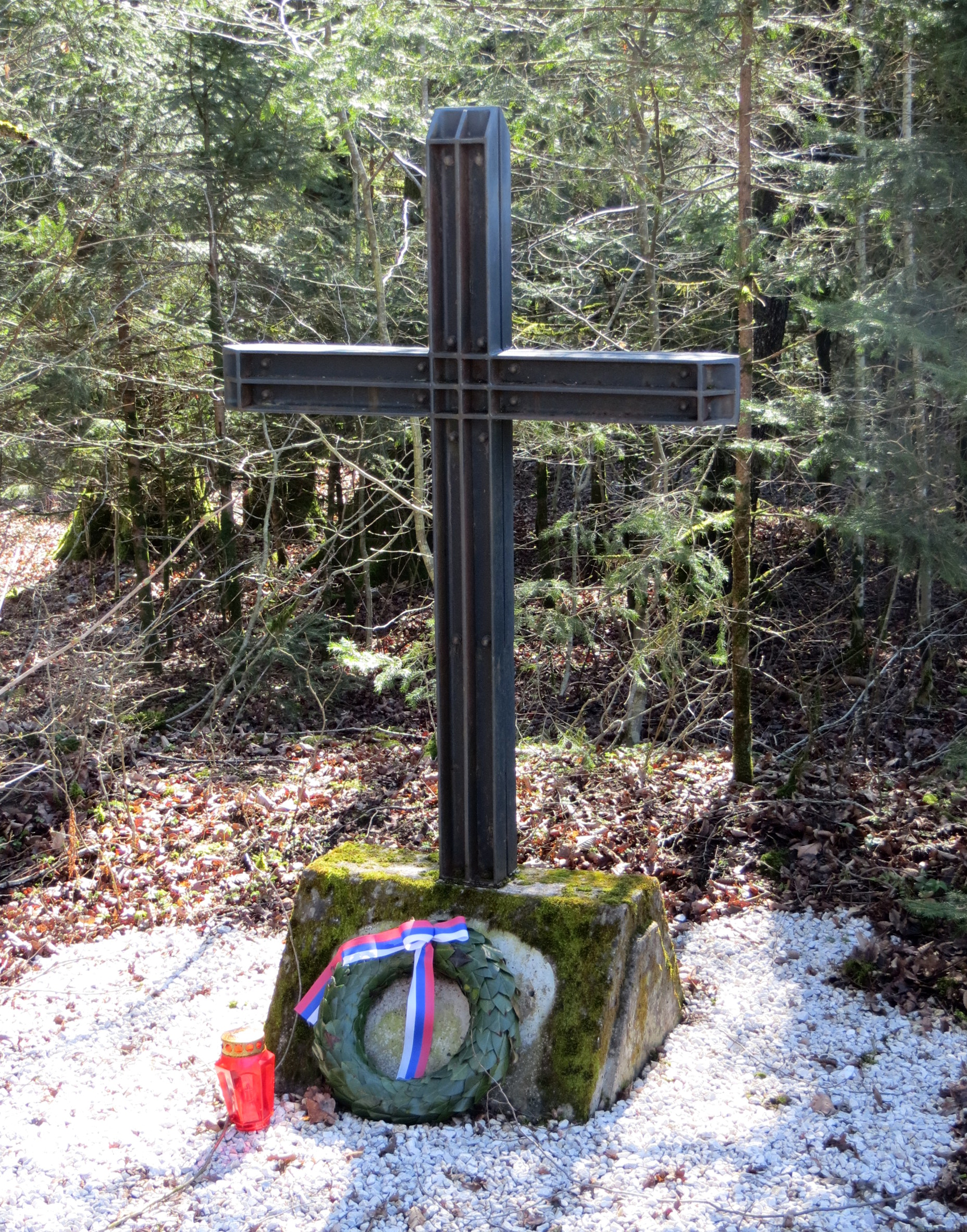
Smovc Mass Grave

Mass graves

Žeje pri Komendi is the site of two known mass graves from the period immediately after the Second World War. The graves contain the remains of 10 to 15 prisoners from Kamnik that were murdered in May and June 1945. Their nationality and whether they were soldiers or civilians is unknown. The Kuhar Woods Mass Grave (Slovene: Grobišče Kuharjev boršt) is located near a path on the edge of a woods north of the main settlement. The Smovc Mass Grave (Grobišče Smovc) is located southwest of the main settlement.
