= Pšata =

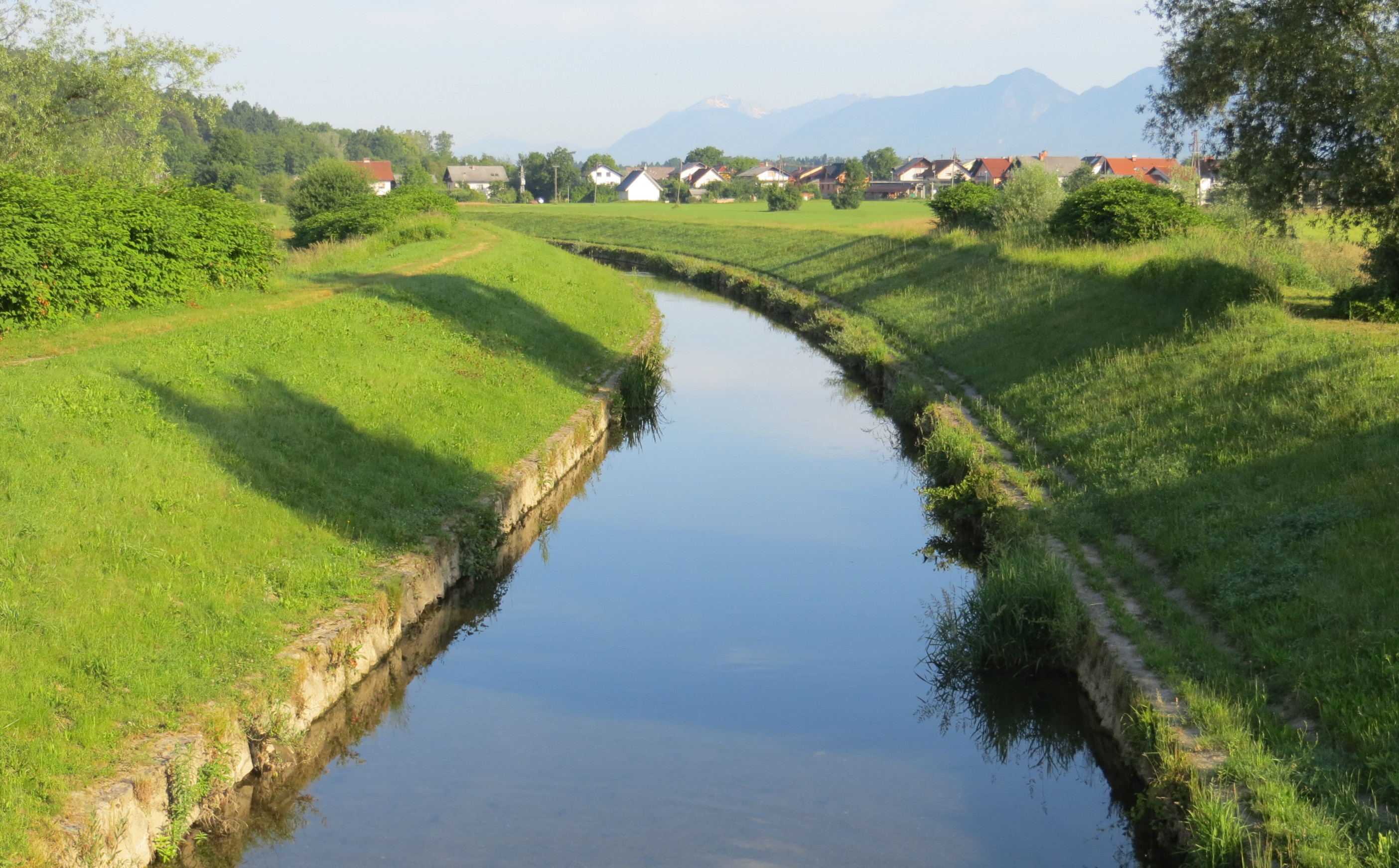
- The Pšata at Topole

Location
- Country: Slovenia

Physical characteristics
- Source
  - elevation: 405 m (1,329 ft)
- Mouth
  - location: Kamnik Bistrica
  - coordinates: 46°05′24″N 14°37′26″E
  - elevation: 269 m (883 ft)
- Length: 28 km (17 mi)
- Basin size: 139 km^{2} (54 sq mi)

Basin features
- Progression: Kamnik Bistrica→ Sava→ Danube→ Black Sea

The Pšata (pronounced [ˈpʃaːta]; in older sources also Pešata) is a river of Slovenia. The river is 28 km (17 mi) long. It is a right tributary of the Kamnik Bistrica, which merges with the Sava east of Ljubljana, the capital of Slovenia.
