= Komenda, Slovenia =

Komenda
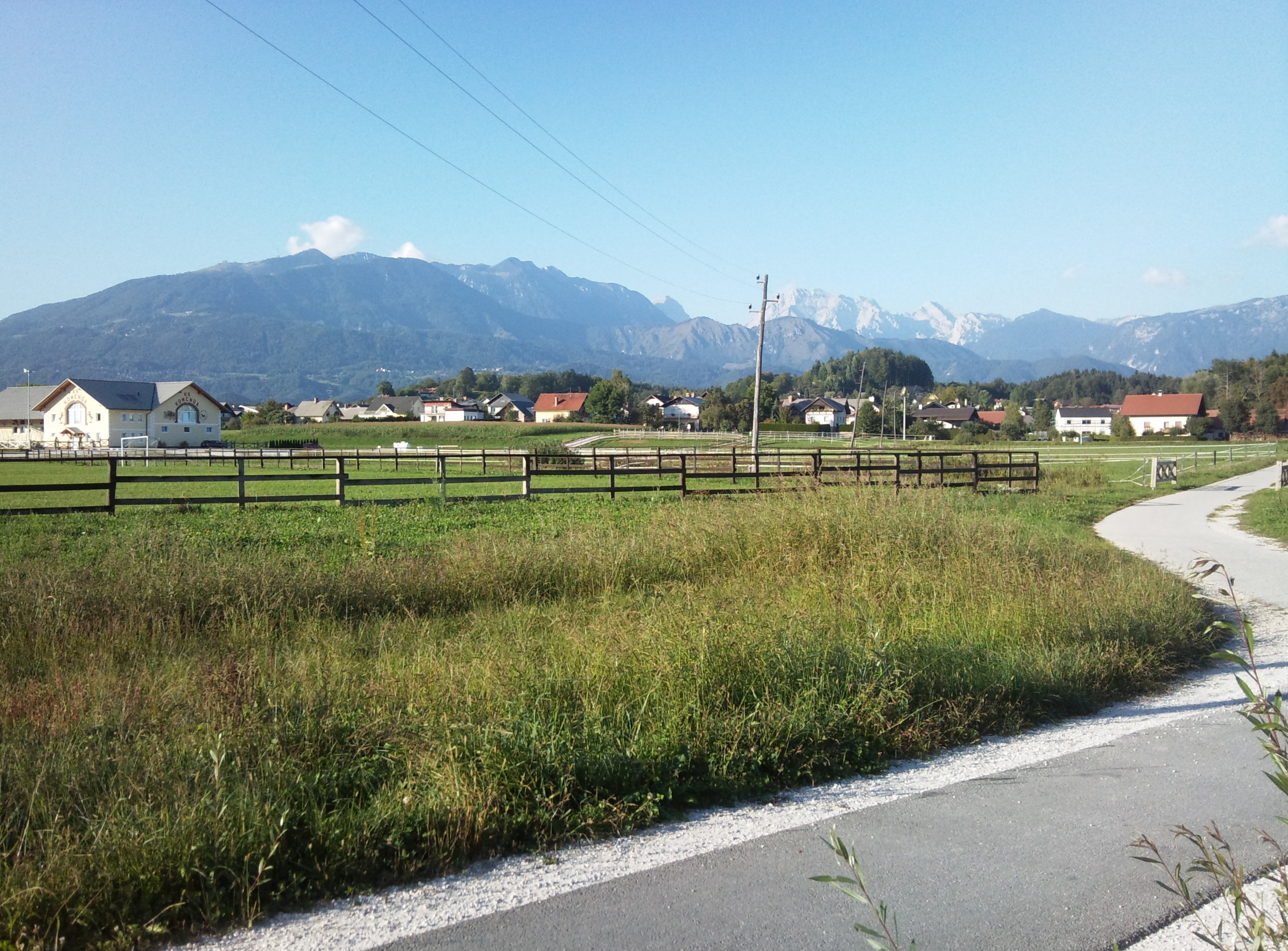

- Location in Slovenia
- Coordinates: 46°12′26.20″N 14°32′20.55″E
- Country: Slovenia
- Traditional region: Upper Carniola
- Statistical region: Central Slovenia
- Municipality: Komenda

Area
  - Total: 2.40 km^{2} (0.93 sq mi)
- Elevation: 346.8 m (1,138 ft)

Population (2012)
  - Total: 896

Komenda (pronounced [kɔˈmɛːnda]; German: Commenda) is a village in the Upper Carniola region of Slovenia. It is the seat of the Municipality of Komenda. It includes the formerly independent settlement of Kaplja Vas (Slovene: Kapla vas, German: Kaplawas).

== Name ==
Komenda was first mentioned in written sources in 1147–54 as de sancto Petro (and as hospitale Sancti Petri in 1296, in der pharren von Sand Peter in 1322, and comendator ad S. Petrum in 1446). The name of the village is identical to the Slovene common noun komenda 'commandry', referring to a property and residence owned by the Knights Hospitaller from 1223 to 1872. The noun komenda is borrowed (probably via German Kommende) from Medieval Latin commenda 'entrusted property'. In the past the German name was Commenda.

== Mass grave ==
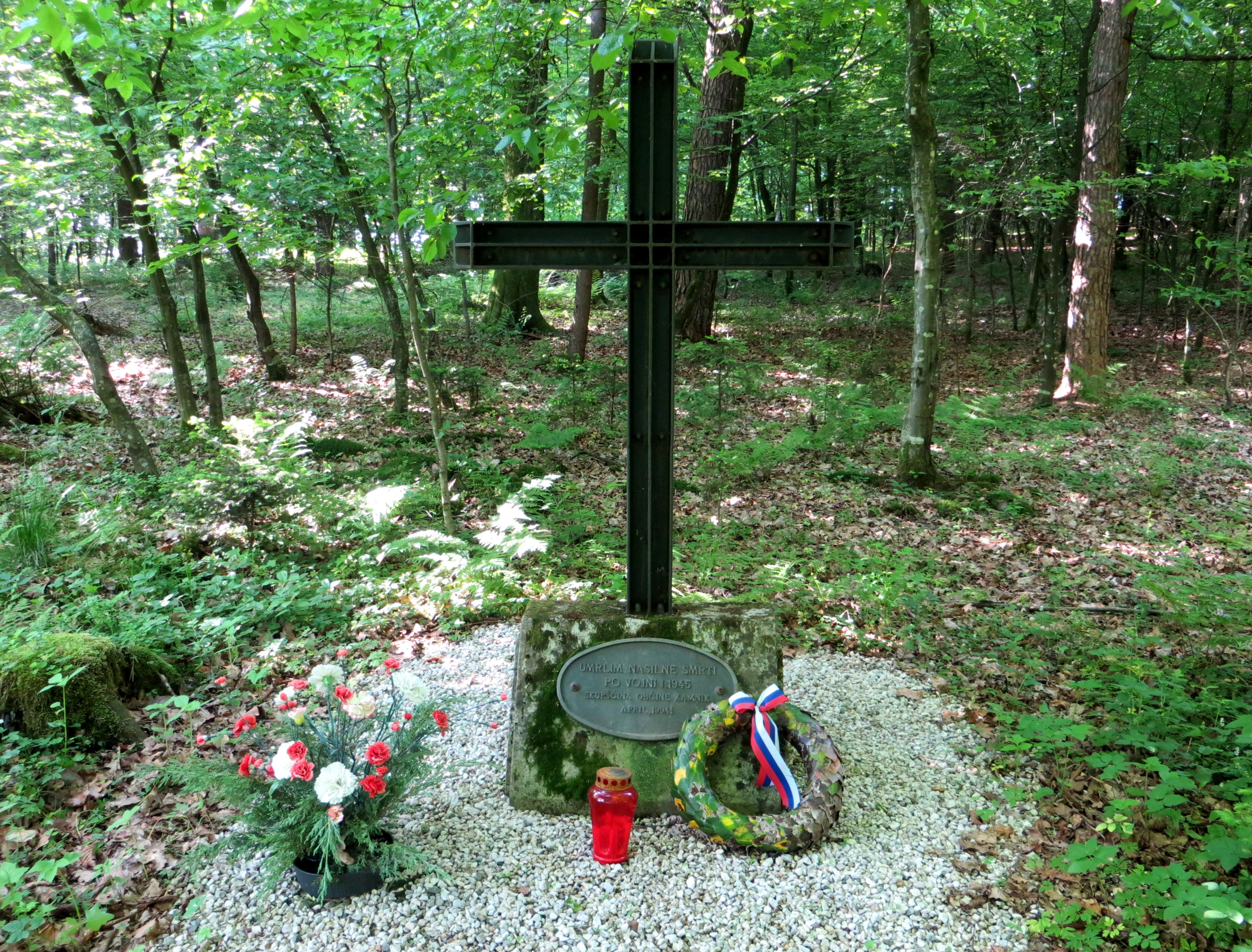
Svešek Alder Mass Grave

Komenda is the site of a mass grave from the period immediately after the Second World War. The Svešek Alder Mass Grave (Slovene: Grobišče Sveščeva jelša) is located at the edge of the Svešek Alder Woods (Sveščeva Jelša) along a forest road northwest of Žeje pri Komendi. It contains the remains of 10 to 15 prisoners from Kamnik murdered in May and June 1945. Their nationalities and whether they were soldiers or civilians is unknown.

== Church ==
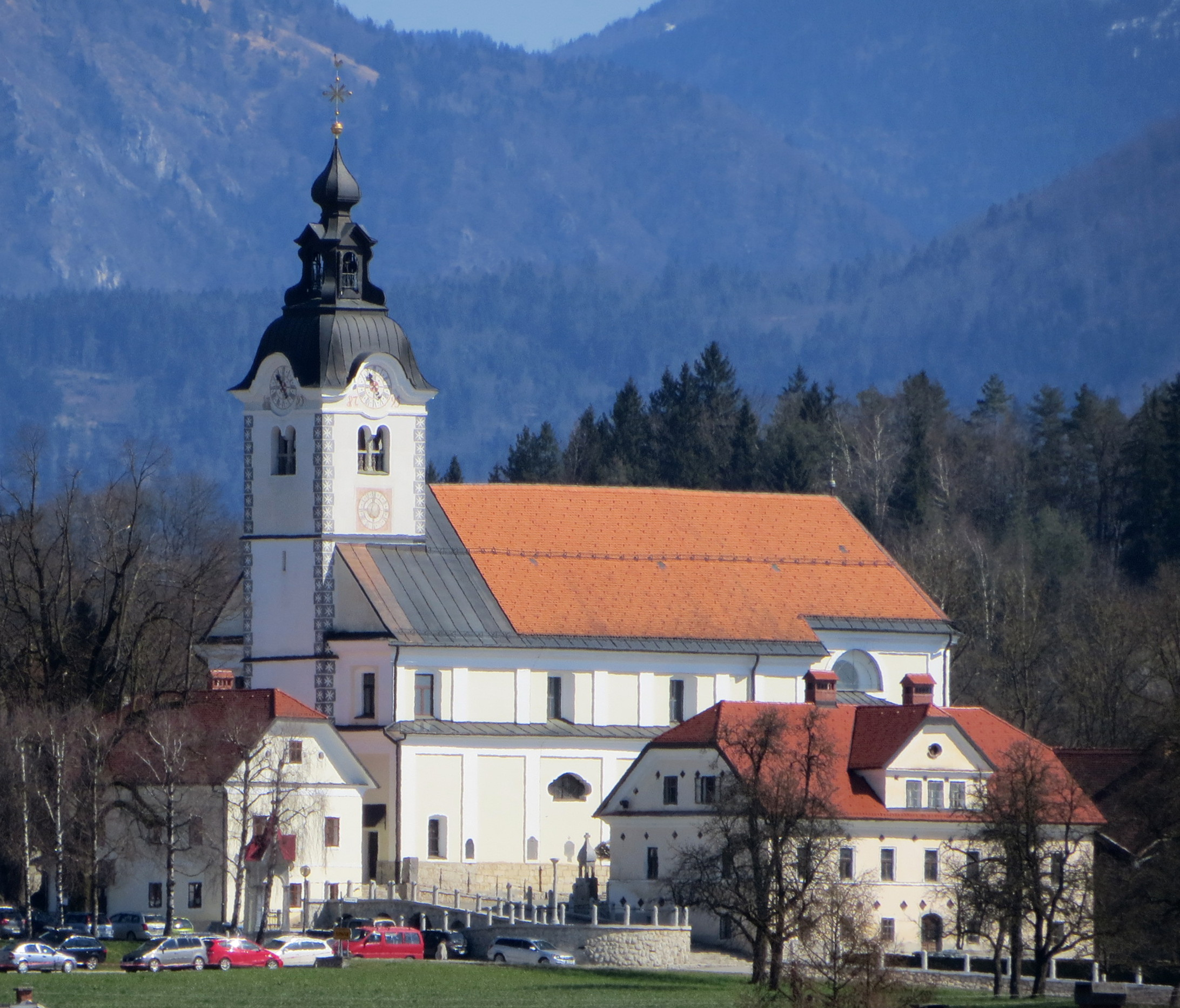
St. Peter's Parish Church

Above the settlement is a complex with a castle, the parish church dedicated to Saint Peter, a parsonage, stables, and a cemetery. A church in Komenda was first referred to in documents dating to 1147. In 1726 the old church was pulled down to make way for the new building. The current one was built in the Baroque style and completed in 1729. It was based on plans by the architect Gregor Maček Jr. The interior and the surroundings were redesigned in the first half of the 20th century based on plans by the architect Jože Plečnik.

== Cultural heritage ==
In addition to Saint Peter's Church, several other structures in Komenda have protected cultural monument status:

- The commandery of the Knights Hospitaller, also known as the Šmid Manor (Slovene: Šmidova graščina), is located immediately northwest of Saint Peter's Church. It is a two-story structure with four wings and an irregular interior courtyard. Its foundations date to the 13th century, and it was renovated in 1872 and again in 1909. The Partisans burned it in 1944, setting a fire in each room, which destroyed all of the furnishings and badly damaged the frescoes and Gothic stonework.
- The Glavar House (Slovene: Glavarjeva hiša) is located at Glavar Street (Glavarjeva cesta) no. 77. It is a two-story structure that Peter Pavel Glavar had built in 1752. Glavar's coat of arms stands above the door casing, and the exterior has three frescoes painted by Franc Jelovšek (1700–1764).
- The Glavar Hospital (Slovene: Glavarjeva bolnišnica) is located south of the cemetery at Glavar Street (Glavarjeva cesta) nos. 104 and 106. It is a two-story building with nine bays, a vaulted interior, and an arcaded walkway in the rear. It was built at the bequest of Peter Pavel Glavar to serve the poor, infirm, and aged. The hospital operated from 1805 to 1947.

== Notable people ==
Notable people who were born or lived in Komenda include:

- Pietro Giacomo de Testaferrata (Slovene: Peter Jakob de Testaferrata; 1673–1763), Maltese knight
- Peter Pavel Glavar (1721–1784), priest, beekeeper, writer, and businessman
- Ivan Selan (1902–1981), counterfeiter and cartographer
- Ivan Sivec (born 1949), writer and journalist
- Agata Zupin (born 1998), hurdles runner

== Twin municipalities ==
- Križevci, Slovenia

== Gallery ==
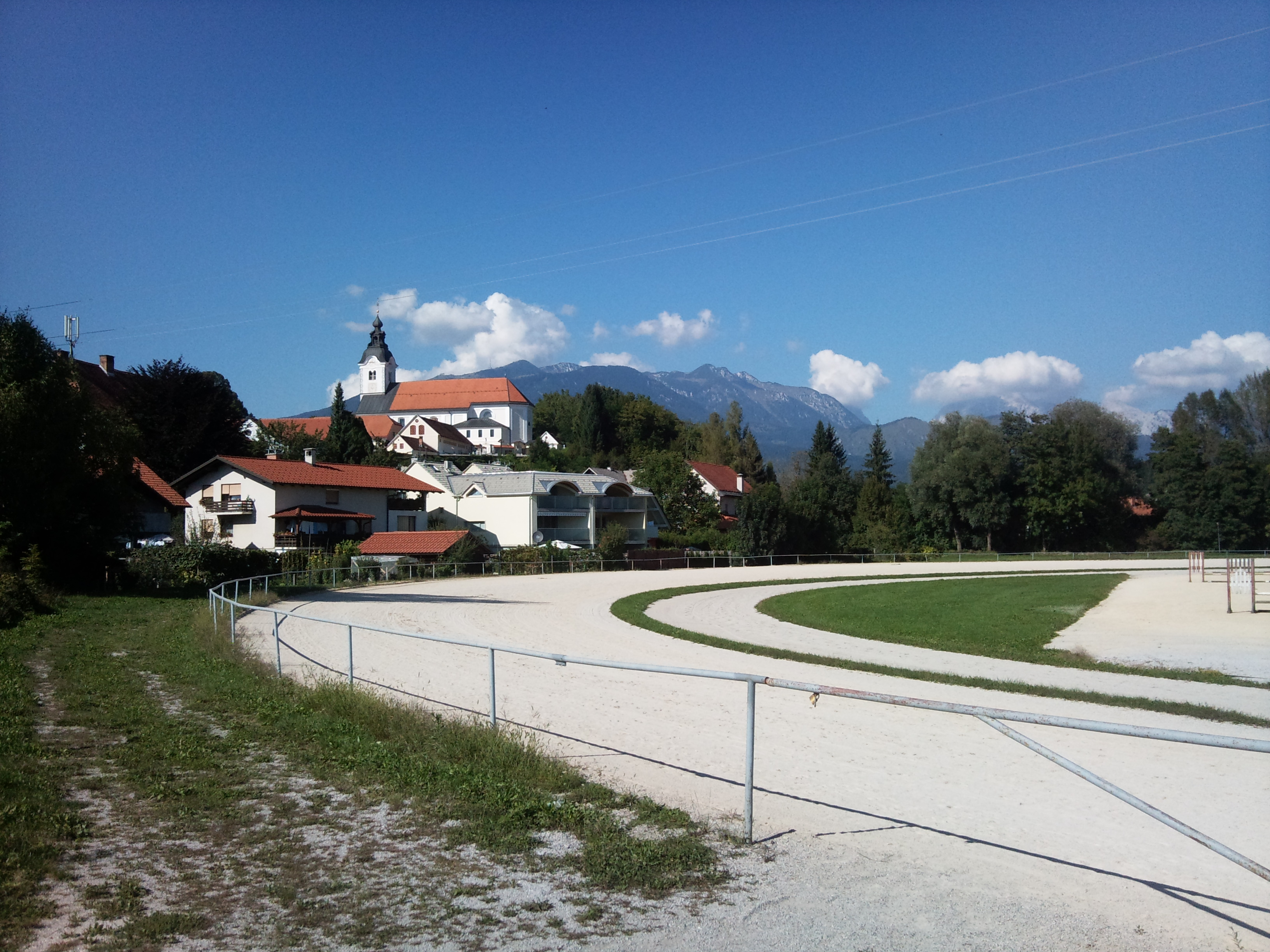
The horse track and the church

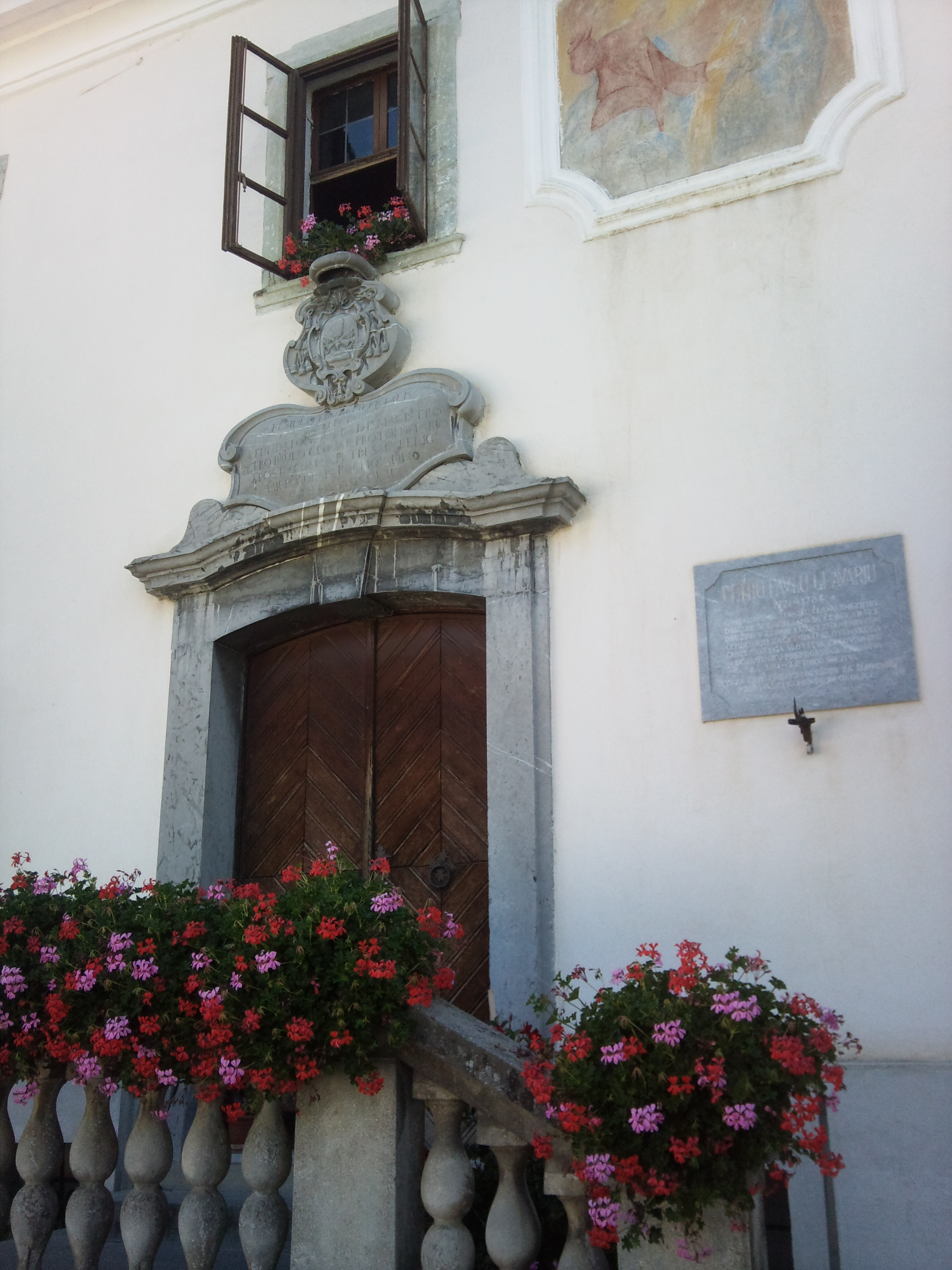
The Baroque portal of the house and library of Peter Pavel Glavar, designed by Franc Jelovšek

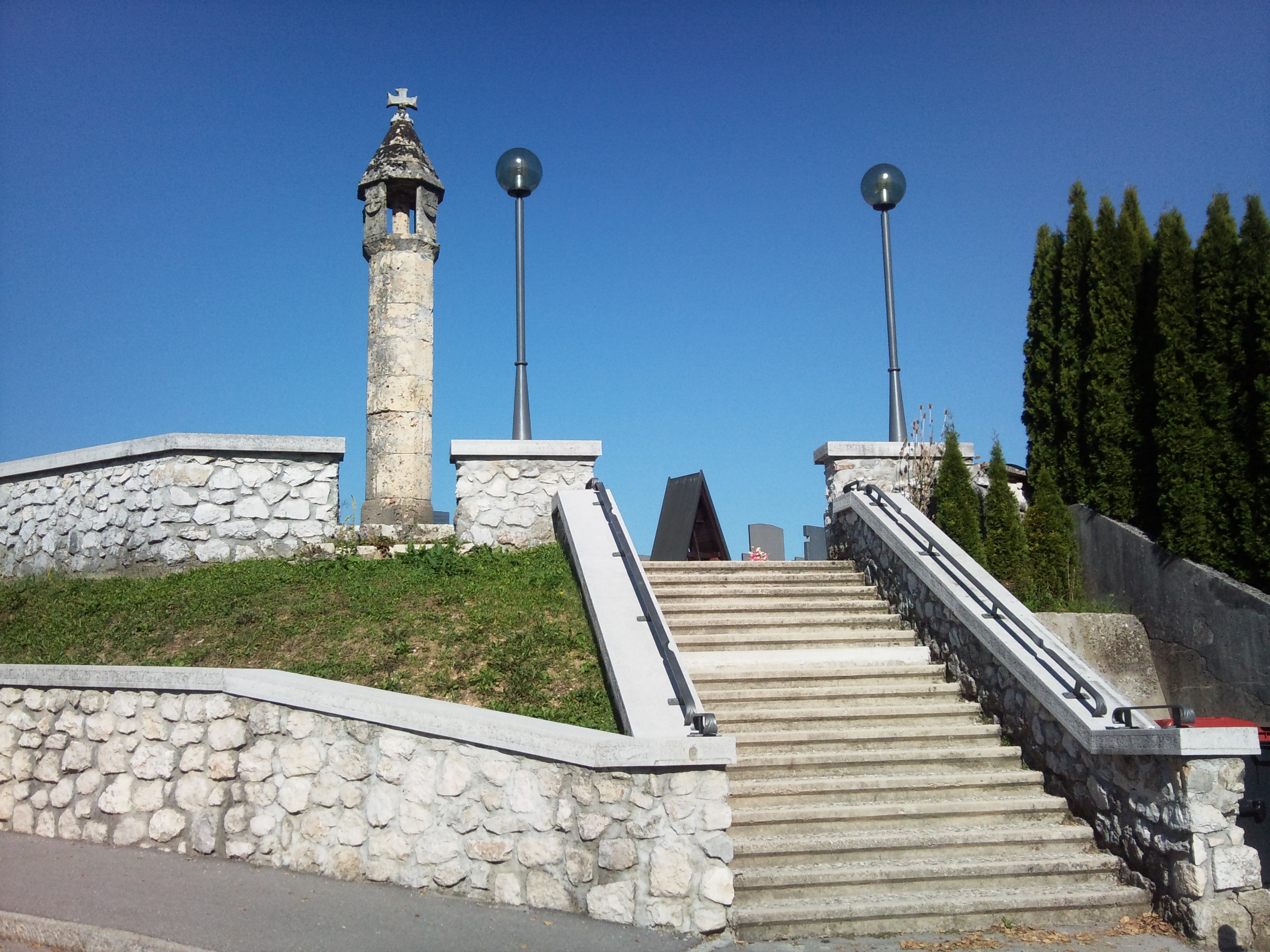
The cemetery with a Gothic memorial column (1510) erected by the Knights Hospitaller

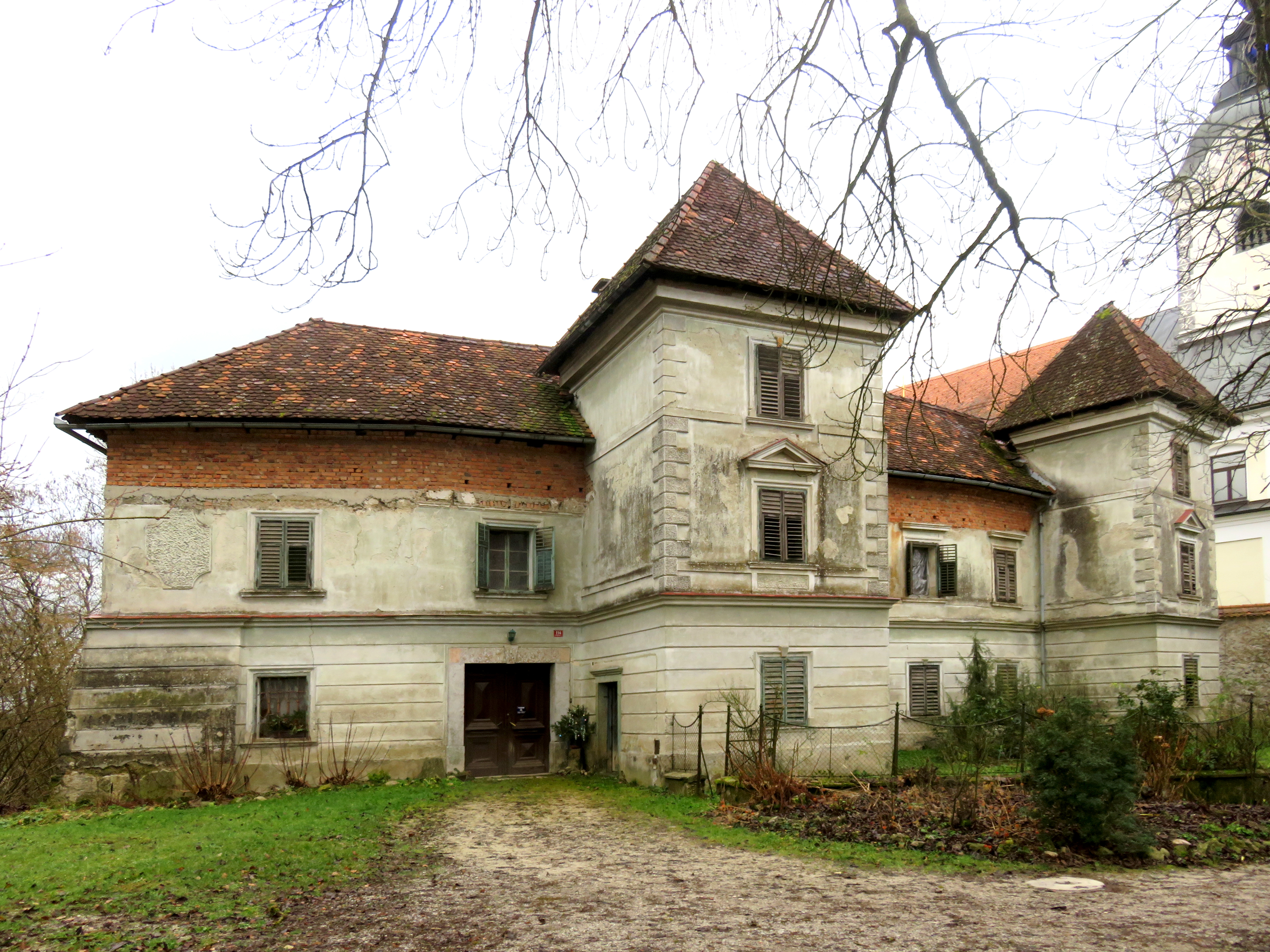
Šmid Manor, built in the 15th century
