= Polica =

Polica may refer to:

== Places ==
=== Poland ===
- Polica (mountain), a mountain in the Żywiec Beskids mountain range

=== Slovenia ===
- Polica, Grosuplje, a settlement in the Municipality of Grosuplje
- Polica, Naklo, a settlement in the Municipality of Naklo
- Babna Polica, a settlement in the Municipality of Loška Dolina
- Bloška Polica, a settlement in the Municipality of Cerknica
- Huda Polica, a settlement in the Municipality of Grosuplje
- Praprotna Polica, a settlement in the Municipality of Cerklje na Gorenjskem
- Pšenična Polica, a settlement in the Municipality of Cerklje na Gorenjskem

== Music ==
- Poliça, an American indie pop and alternative rock band from Minneapolis, Minnesota
