= Sidraž =

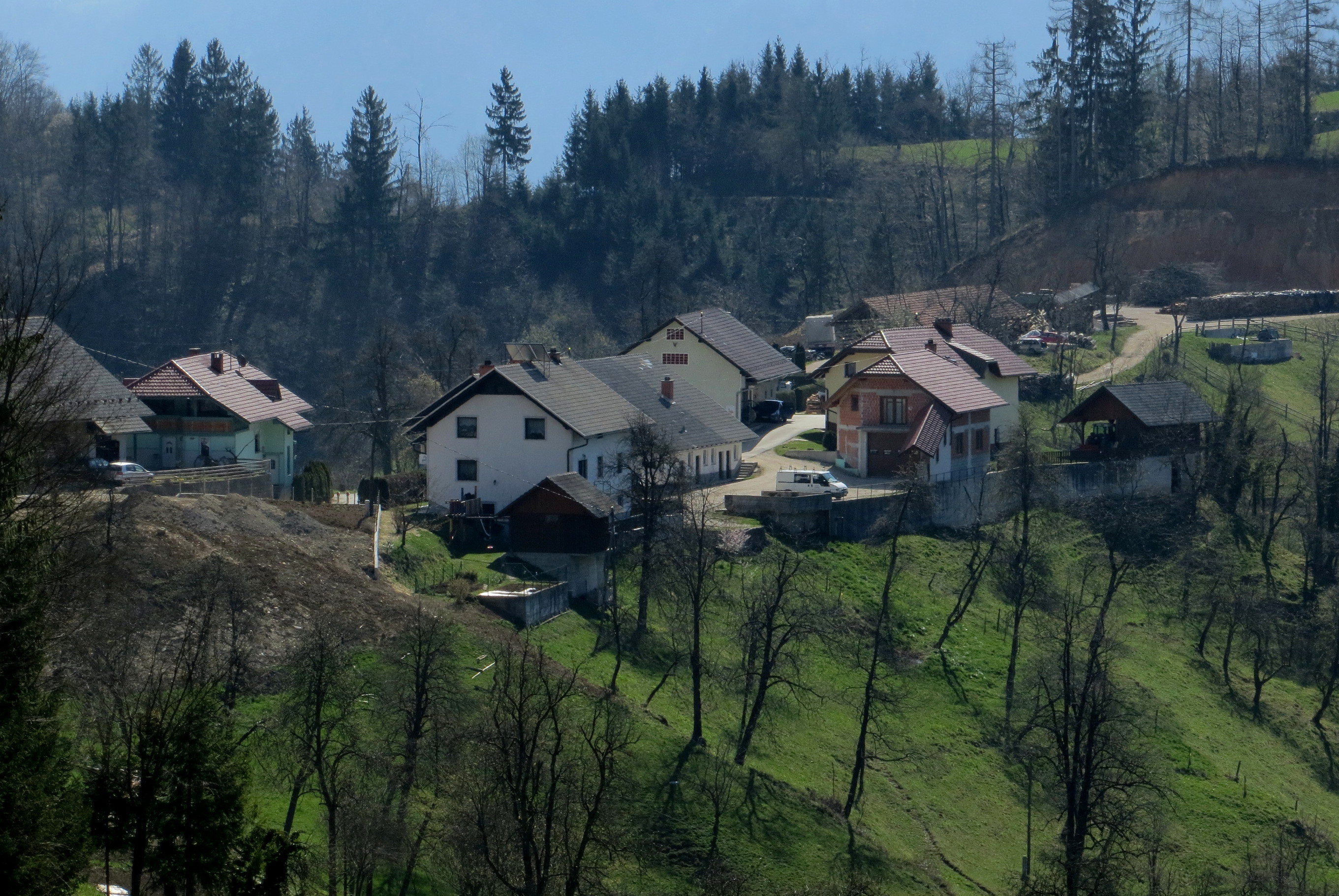

- Location in Slovenia
- Coordinates: 46°15′38.94″N 14°33′45.8″E
- Country: Slovenia
- Traditional Region: Upper Carniola
- Statistical region: Upper Carniola
- Municipality: Cerklje na Gorenjskem
- Elevation: 583 m (1,913 ft)

Population (2020)
  - Total: 43

Sidraž (pronounced [ˈsiːdɾaʃ]) is a settlement in the Municipality of Cerklje na Gorenjskem in the Upper Carniola region of Slovenia.

== Geography ==
Sidraž is a hill settlement in a shady location east of Šenturška Gora on a saddle between Doblič and Tunjščica creeks. The soil is loamy and there is a spring near the village.

== Name ==
Sidraž was mentioned in historical sources in 1421 as Schydrachs (and as Sidras in 1449, Sydrasch in 1458, and Schidrass in 1475). The name is of unclear origin. A proposed derivation from *suhi draž is very unlikely for phonological reasons, and the village name is more likely based on a truncated personal name.
