= Ravne, Cerklje na Gorenjskem =

Ravne
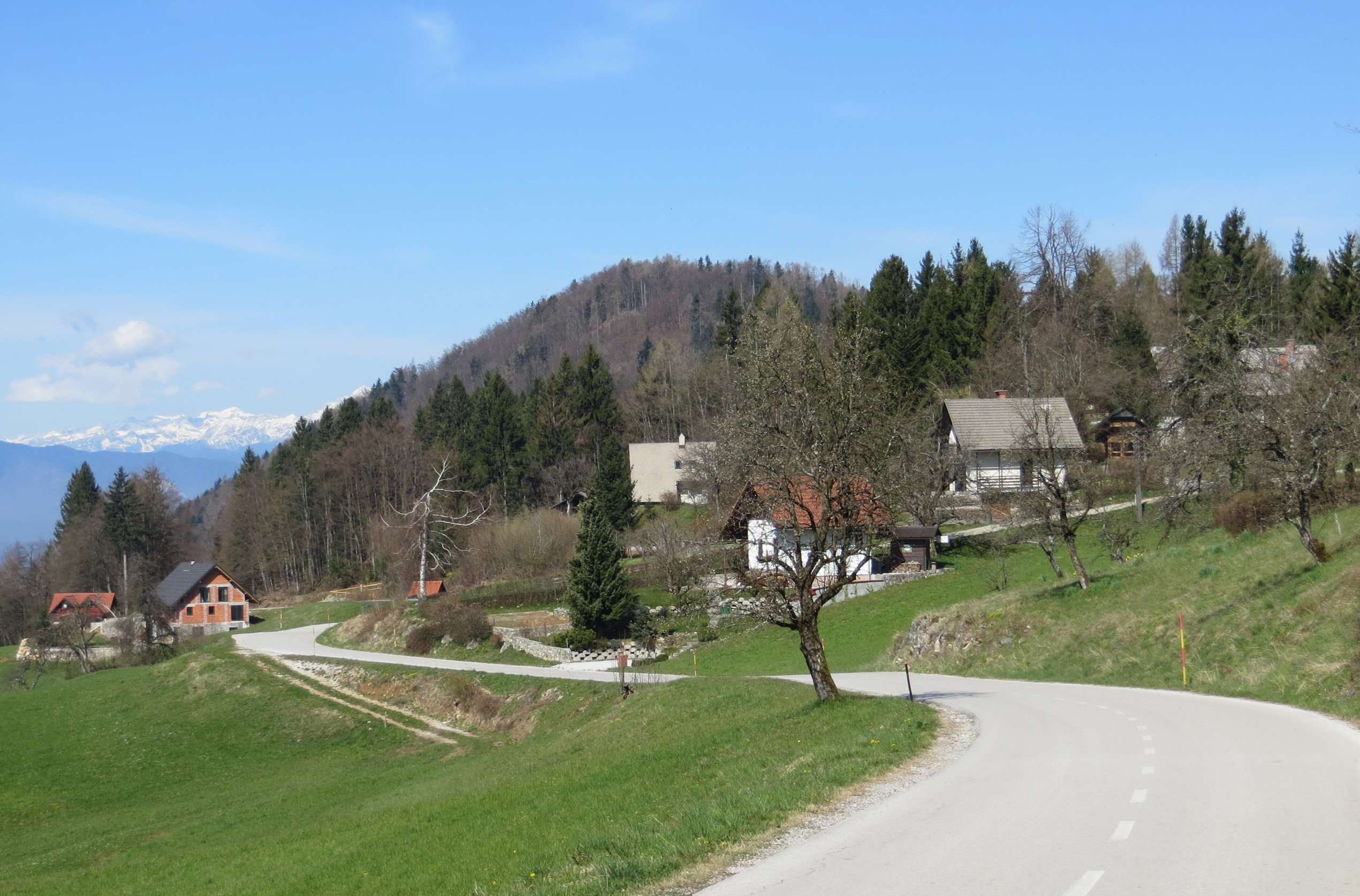

- Location in Slovenia
- Coordinates: 46°15′49.04″N 14°31′18.15″E
- Country: Slovenia
- Traditional Region: Upper Carniola
- Statistical region: Upper Carniola
- Municipality: Cerklje na Gorenjskem
- Elevation: 678.9 m (2,227 ft)

Population (2020)
  - Total: 28

Ravne (pronounced [ˈɾáːwnɛ]; German: Raune) is a settlement in the Municipality of Cerklje na Gorenjskem in the Upper Carniola region of Slovenia.
