= Štefanja Gora =

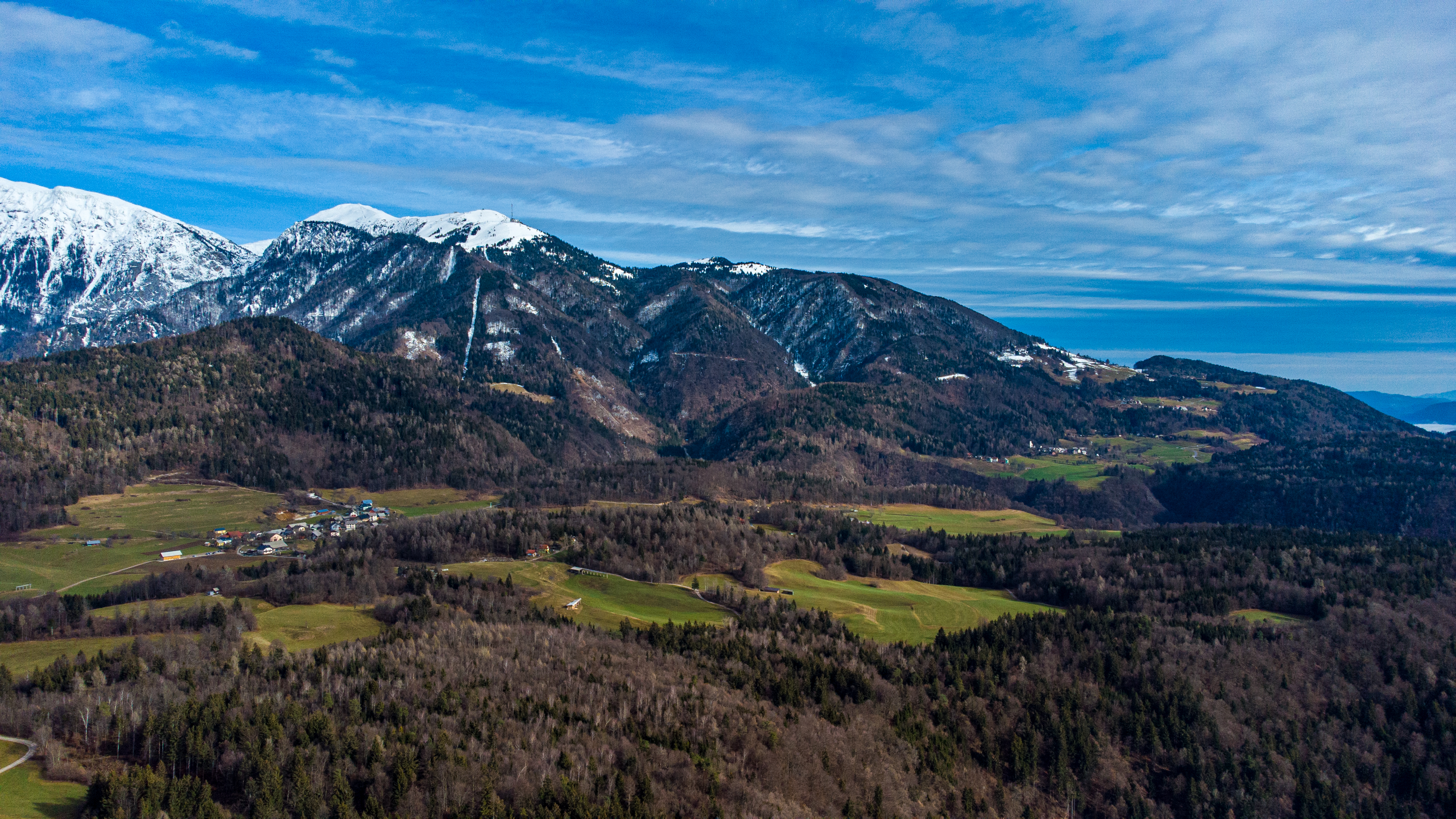

- Location in Slovenia
- Coordinates: 46°17′12.01″N 14°29′1.94″E
- Country: Slovenia
- Traditional Region: Upper Carniola
- Statistical region: Upper Carniola
- Municipality: Cerklje na Gorenjskem
- Elevation: 693.3 m (2,275 ft)

Population (2020)
  - Total: 103

Štefanja Gora (pronounced [ʃtɛˈfaːnja ˈɡɔːɾa]; German: Stefansberg) is a village in the Municipality of Cerklje na Gorenjskem in the Upper Carniola region of Slovenia.

The local church is dedicated to Saint Stephen and was originally built around 1132. The current building dates to 1805, when the entire church was rebuilt after the older one was destroyed by lightning.
