= Vrhovje =

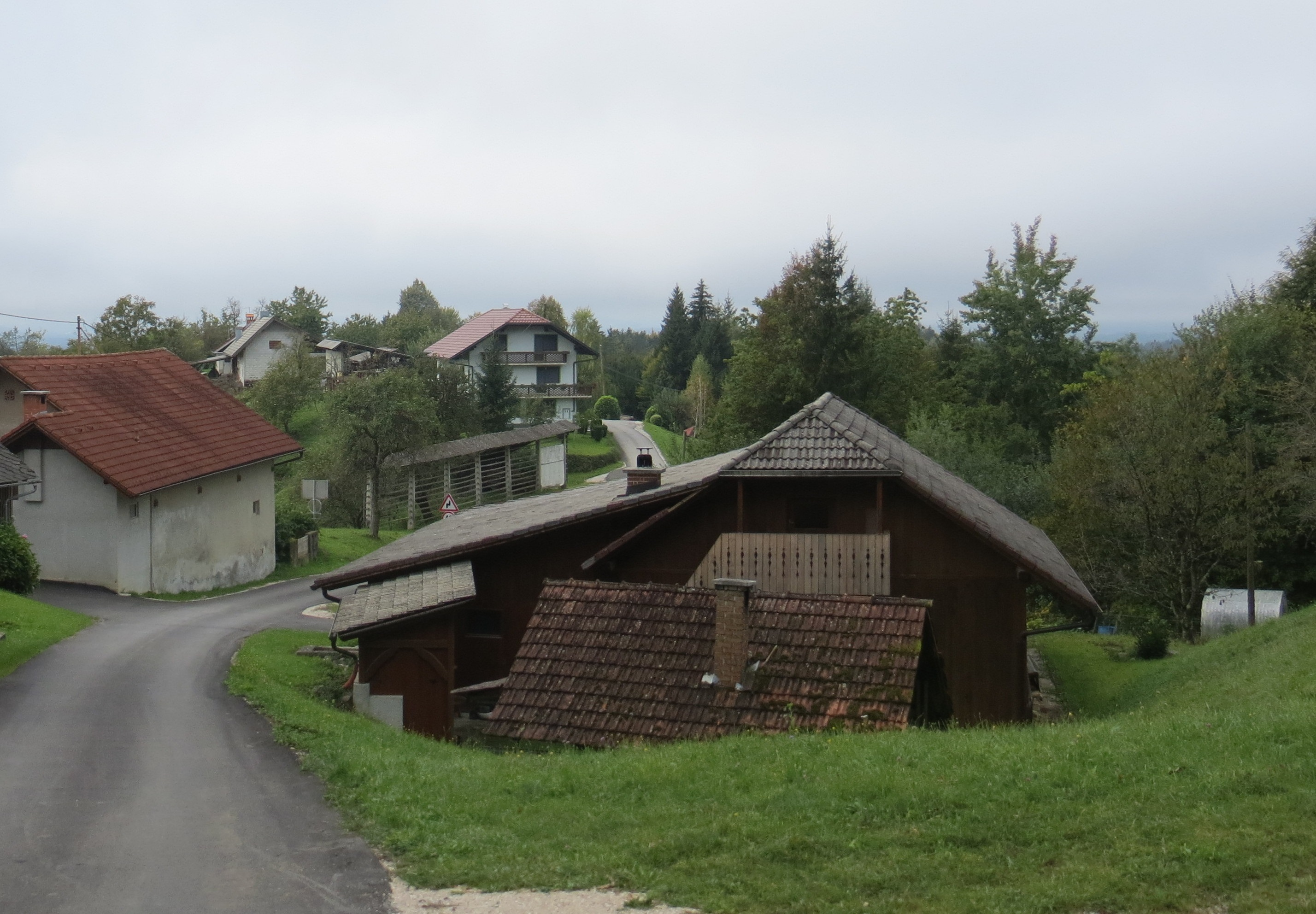

- Location in Slovenia
- Coordinates: 46°14′45.81″N 14°33′45.29″E
- Country: Slovenia
- Traditional Region: Upper Carniola
- Statistical region: Upper Carniola
- Municipality: Cerklje na Gorenjskem
- Elevation: 447.3 m (1,468 ft)

Population (2020)
  - Total: 7

Vrhovje (pronounced [ʋəɾˈːxou̯jɛ]) is a small settlement in the Municipality of Cerklje na Gorenjskem in the Upper Carniola region of Slovenia. In 2017 it had a population of six.
