= Vašca =

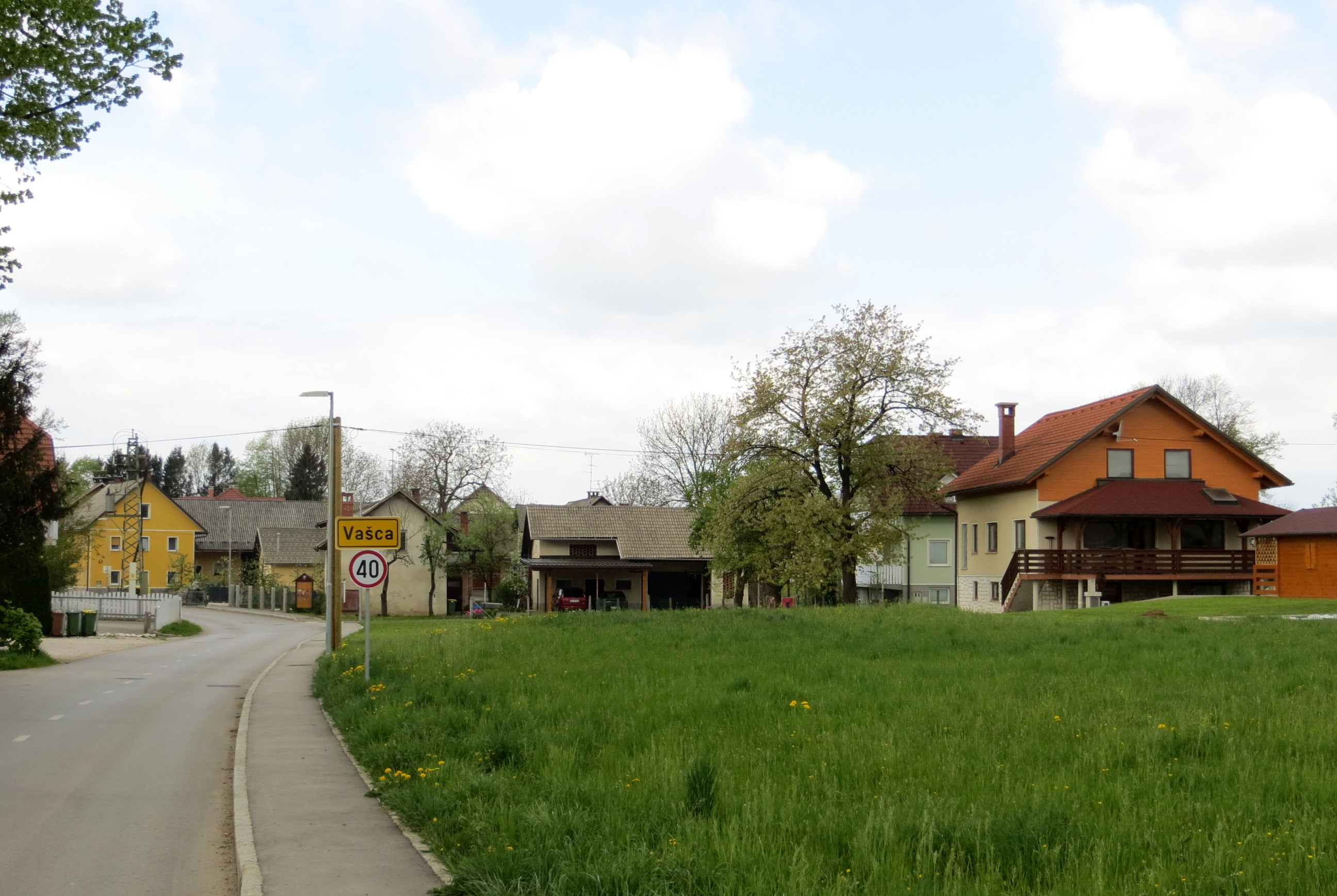

- Location in Slovenia
- Coordinates: 46°15′4.65″N 14°28′45.85″E
- Country: Slovenia
- Traditional Region: Upper Carniola
- Statistical region: Upper Carniola
- Municipality: Cerklje na Gorenjskem
- Elevation: 391.1 m (1,283 ft)

Population (2020)
  - Total: 86

Vašca (pronounced [ˈʋaːʃtsa]; in older sources also Vašce, German: Waschze) is a settlement in the Municipality of Cerklje na Gorenjskem in the Upper Carniola region of Slovenia.
