= Vopovlje =

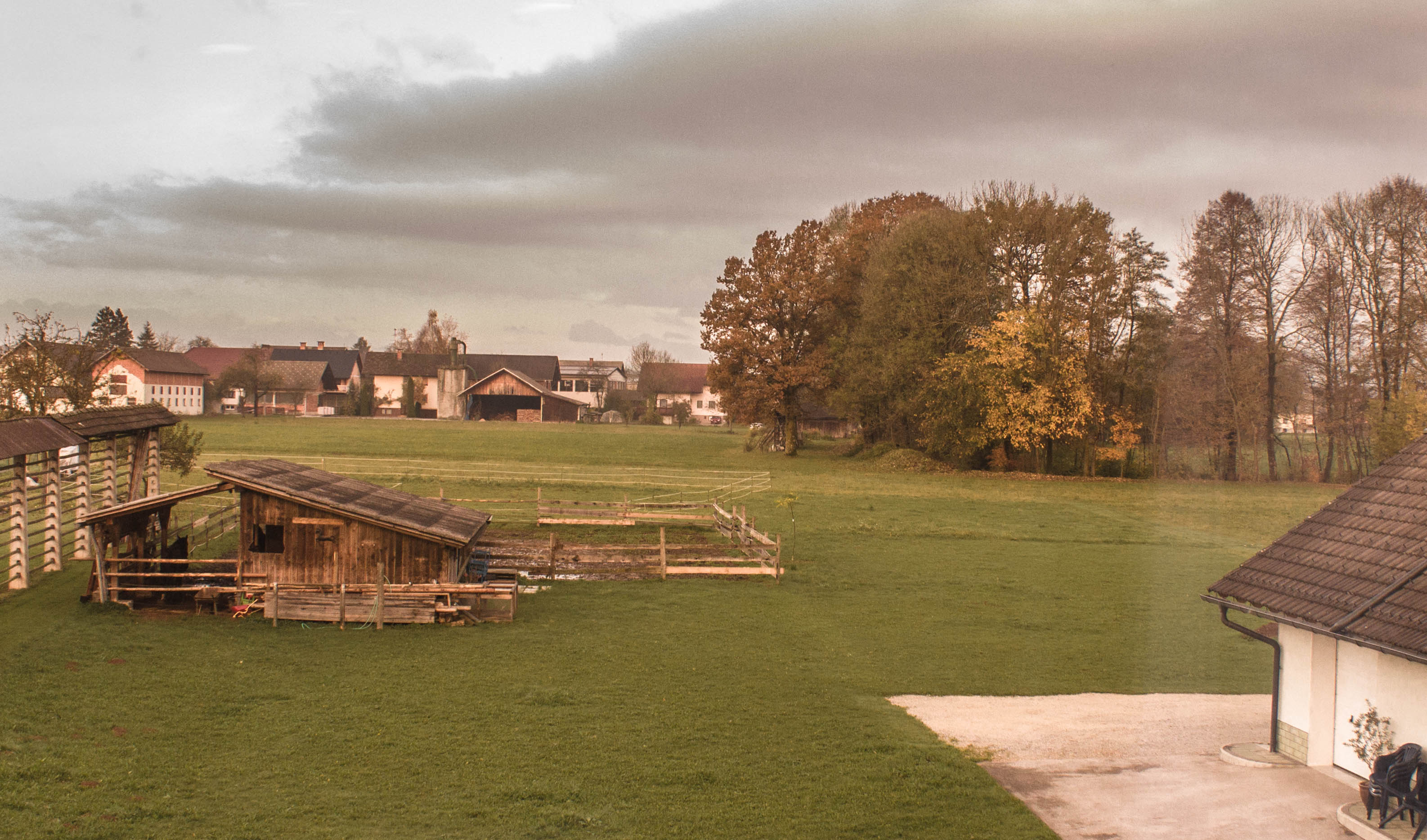

- Location in Slovenia
- Coordinates: 46°13′35.17″N 14°29′40.36″E
- Country: Slovenia
- Traditional Region: Upper Carniola
- Statistical region: Upper Carniola
- Municipality: Cerklje na Gorenjskem
- Elevation: 362.1 m (1,188 ft)

Population (2020)
  - Total: 127

Vopovlje (pronounced [ˈʋoːpɔu̯ljɛ]) is a settlement in the Municipality of Cerklje na Gorenjskem in the Upper Carniola region of Slovenia.
