= Šmartno, Cerklje na Gorenjskem =

Šmartno
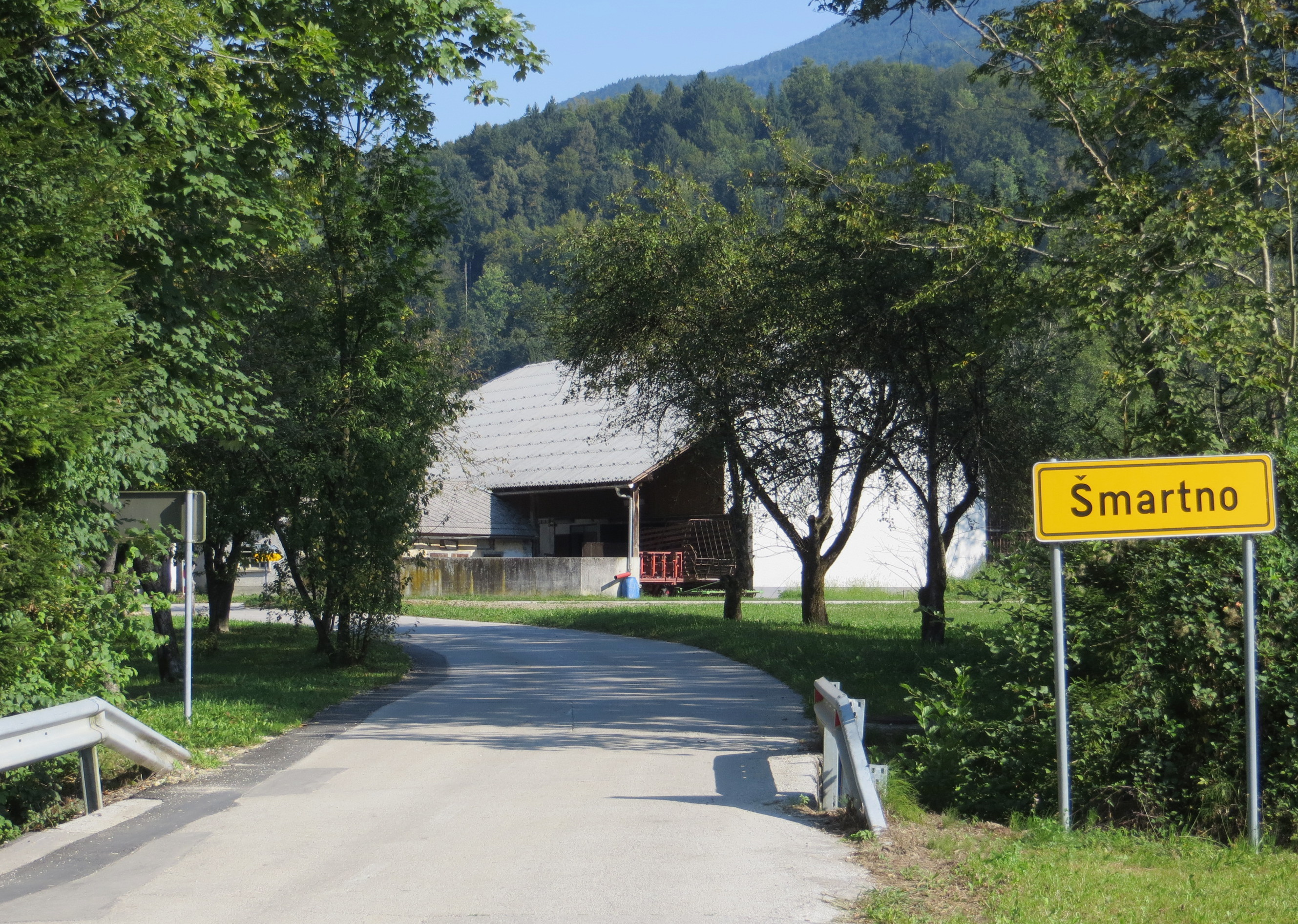

- Location in Slovenia
- Coordinates: 46°14′48.37″N 14°30′56.26″E
- Country: Slovenia
- Traditional Region: Upper Carniola
- Statistical region: Upper Carniola
- Municipality: Cerklje na Gorenjskem
- Elevation: 373.4 m (1,225 ft)

Population (2020)
  - Total: 302

Šmartno (pronounced [ˈʃmaːɾtnɔ]; German: Sankt Martin) is a village in the Municipality of Cerklje na Gorenjskem in the Upper Carniola region of Slovenia.

== Church ==
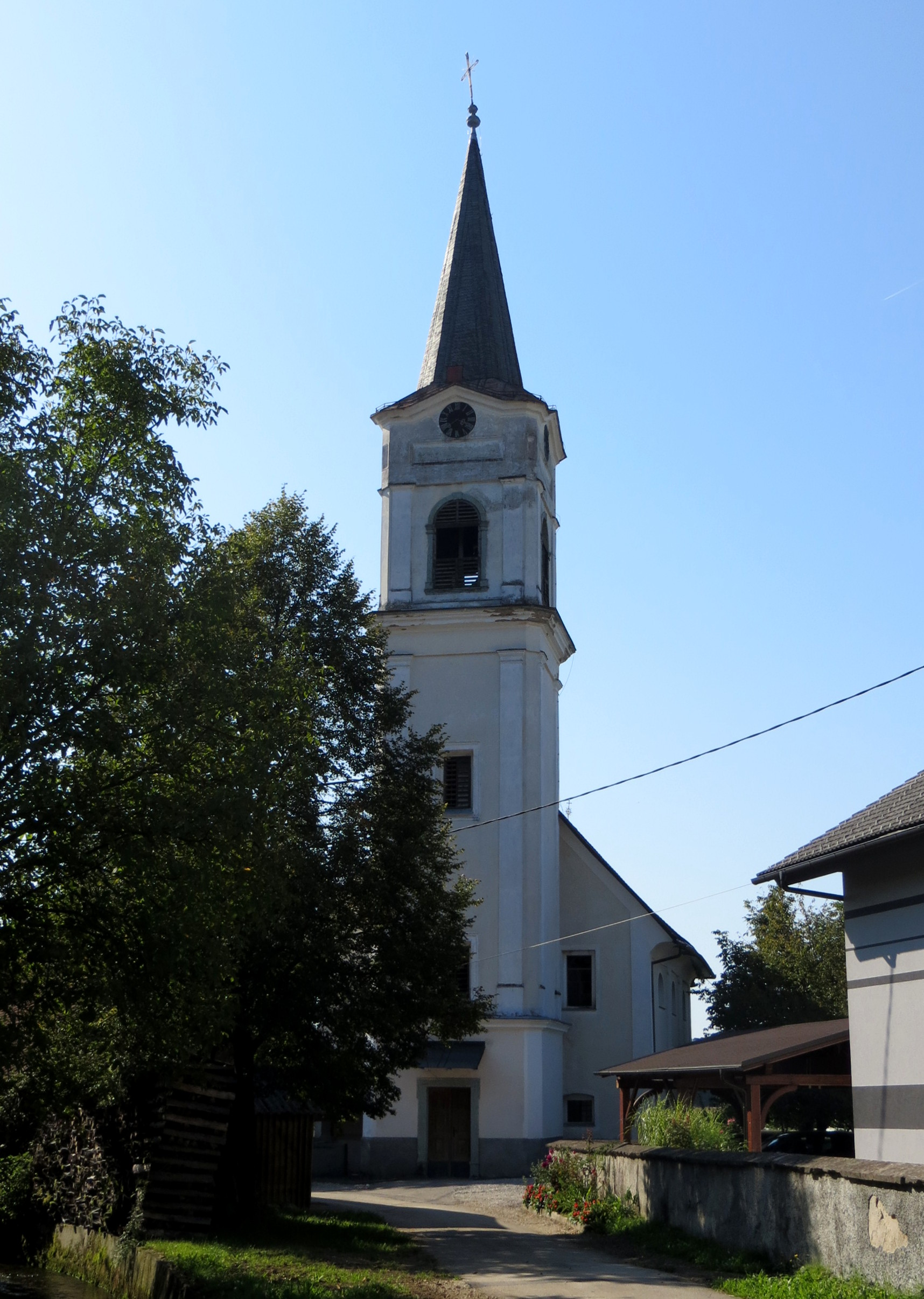
Saint Martin's Church

The local church is dedicated to Saint Martin, giving the name to the village itself. It was first mentioned in written documents from 1387, but archaeological evidence shows it is built on the site of an early Christian church from Late Antiquity.
