= Pšata, Cerklje na Gorenjskem =

Pšata
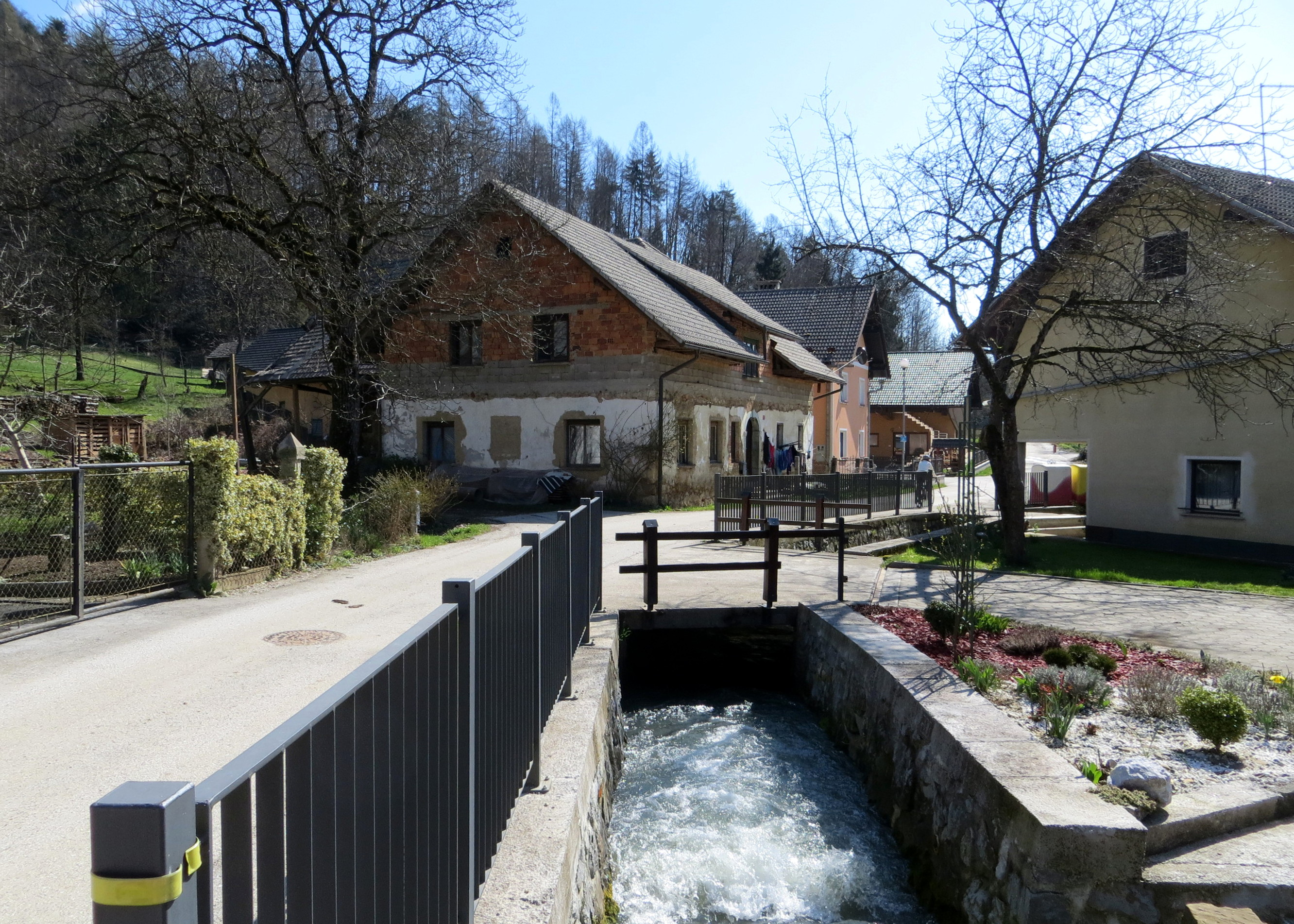

- Location in Slovenia
- Coordinates: 46°15′35.86″N 14°30′25.96″E
- Country: Slovenia
- Traditional Region: Upper Carniola
- Statistical region: Upper Carniola
- Municipality: Cerklje na Gorenjskem
- Elevation: 399.5 m (1,311 ft)

Population (2020)
  - Total: 140

Pšata (pronounced [ˈpʃaːta]; German: Beischeid) is a village in the Municipality of Cerklje na Gorenjskem in the Upper Carniola region of Slovenia.

== Church ==
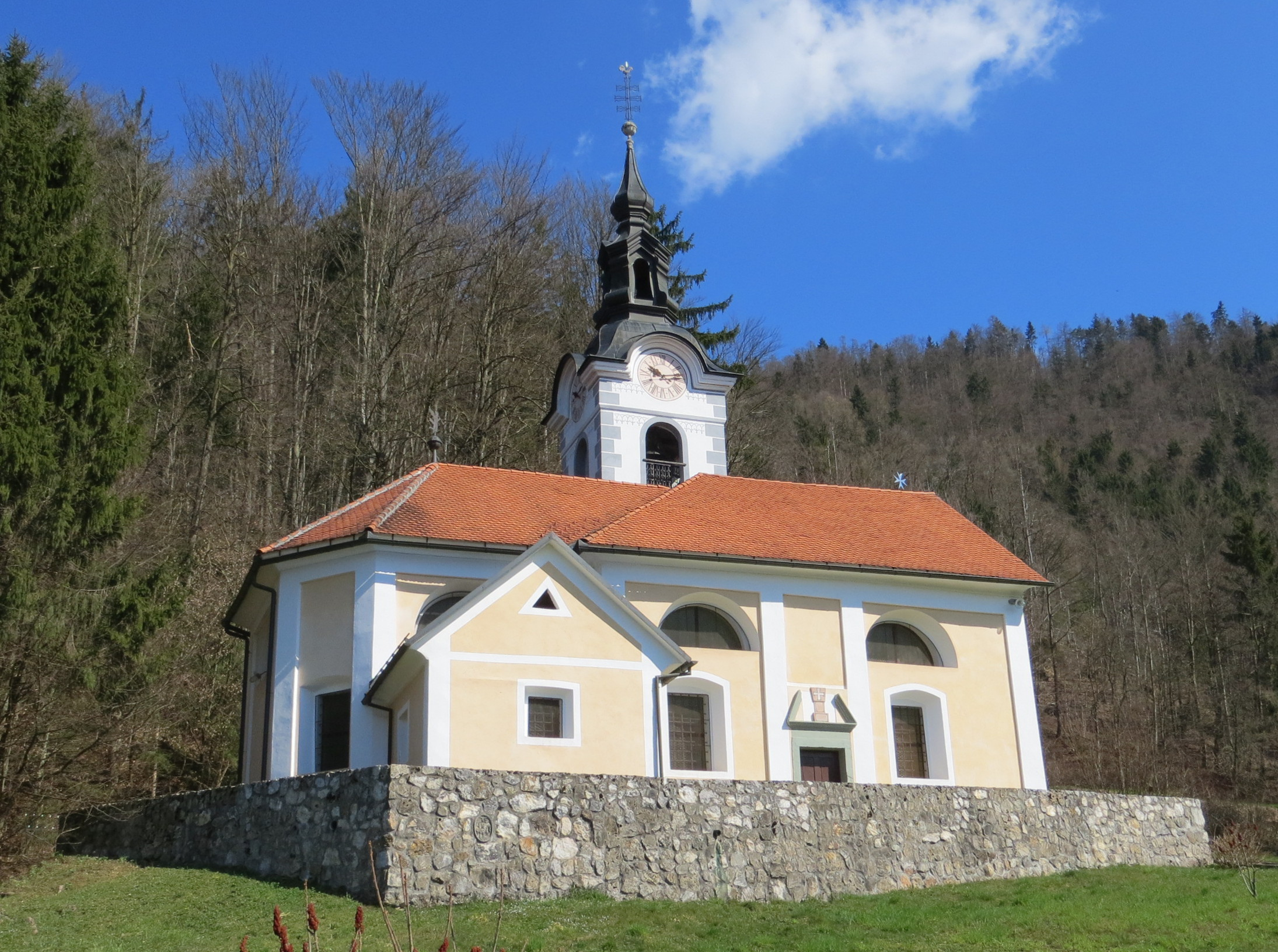
Saint Mary Magdalene Church

The local church is dedicated to Mary Magdalene. It was built in 1738, on the site of an earlier church.
