= Češnjevek, Cerklje na Gorenjskem =

Češnjevek
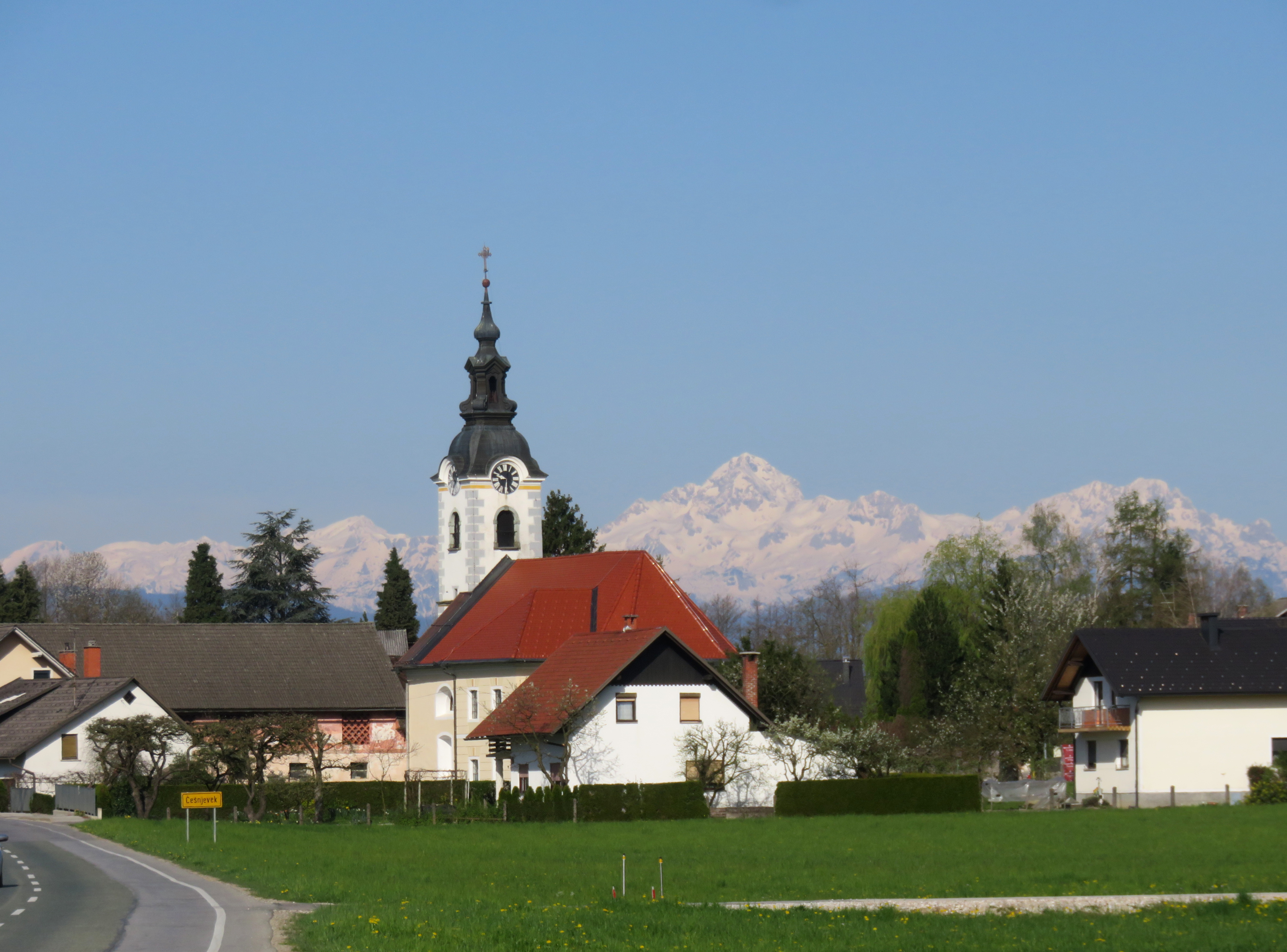

- Location in Slovenia
- Coordinates: 46°15′44.95″N 14°28′4.84″E
- Country: Slovenia
- Traditional Region: Upper Carniola
- Statistical region: Upper Carniola
- Municipality: Cerklje na Gorenjskem
- Elevation: 406.3 m (1,333 ft)

Population (2020)
  - Total: 160

Češnjevek (pronounced [ˈtʃeːʃnjɛʋək]; German: Kerschstetten) is a village in the Municipality of Cerklje na Gorenjskem in the Upper Carniola region of Slovenia.

== Pheasantry ==
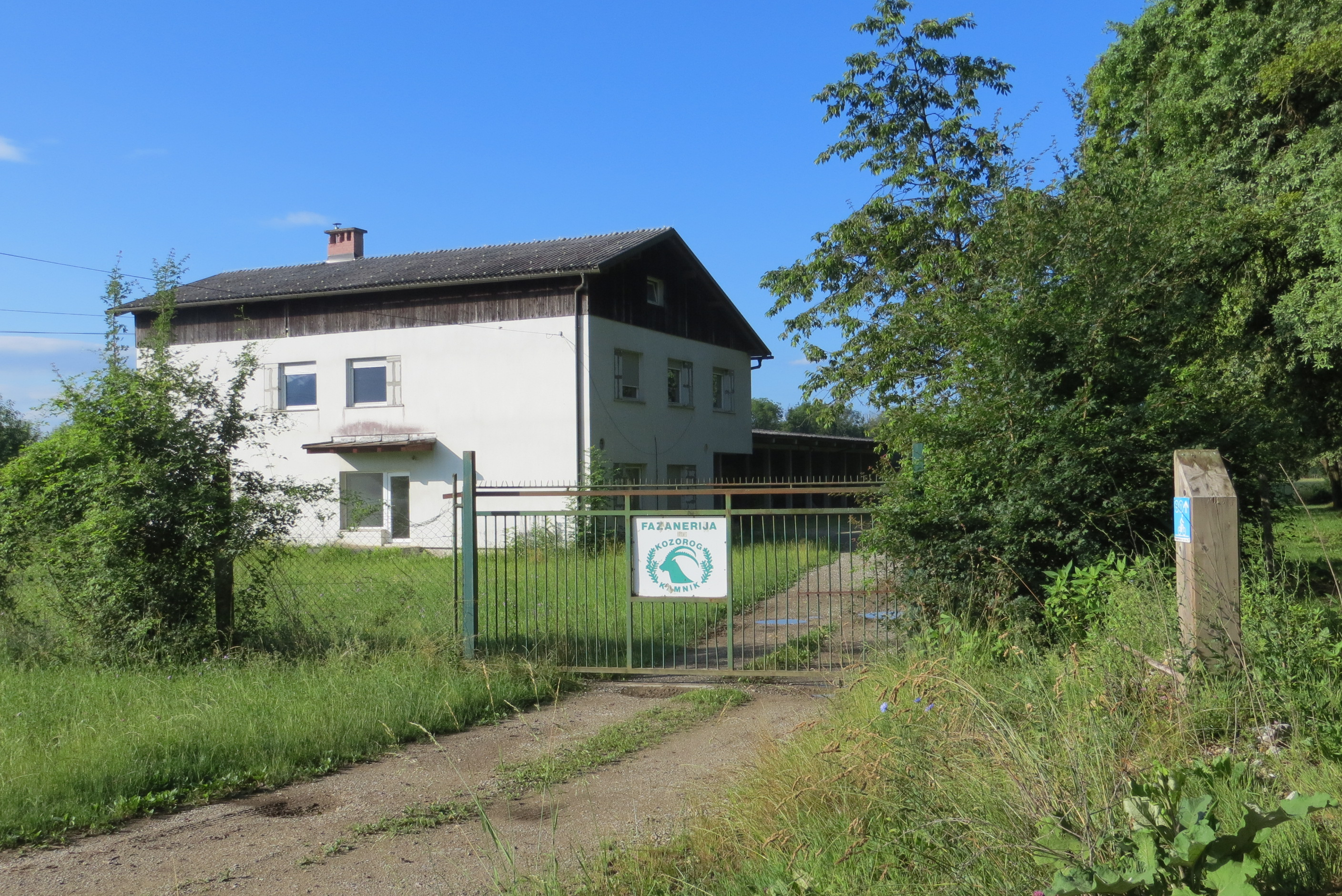
The pheasantry in Češnjevek in 2019

A pheasantry was established in Češnjevek in 1963, and it also started raising partridges in 1967. The birds were raised for hunting clubs, and in its heyday the pheasantry raised about 15,000 pheasants per year. The property was sold in 2021.

== Church ==
The local church is dedicated to the Holy Spirit.
