= Apno =

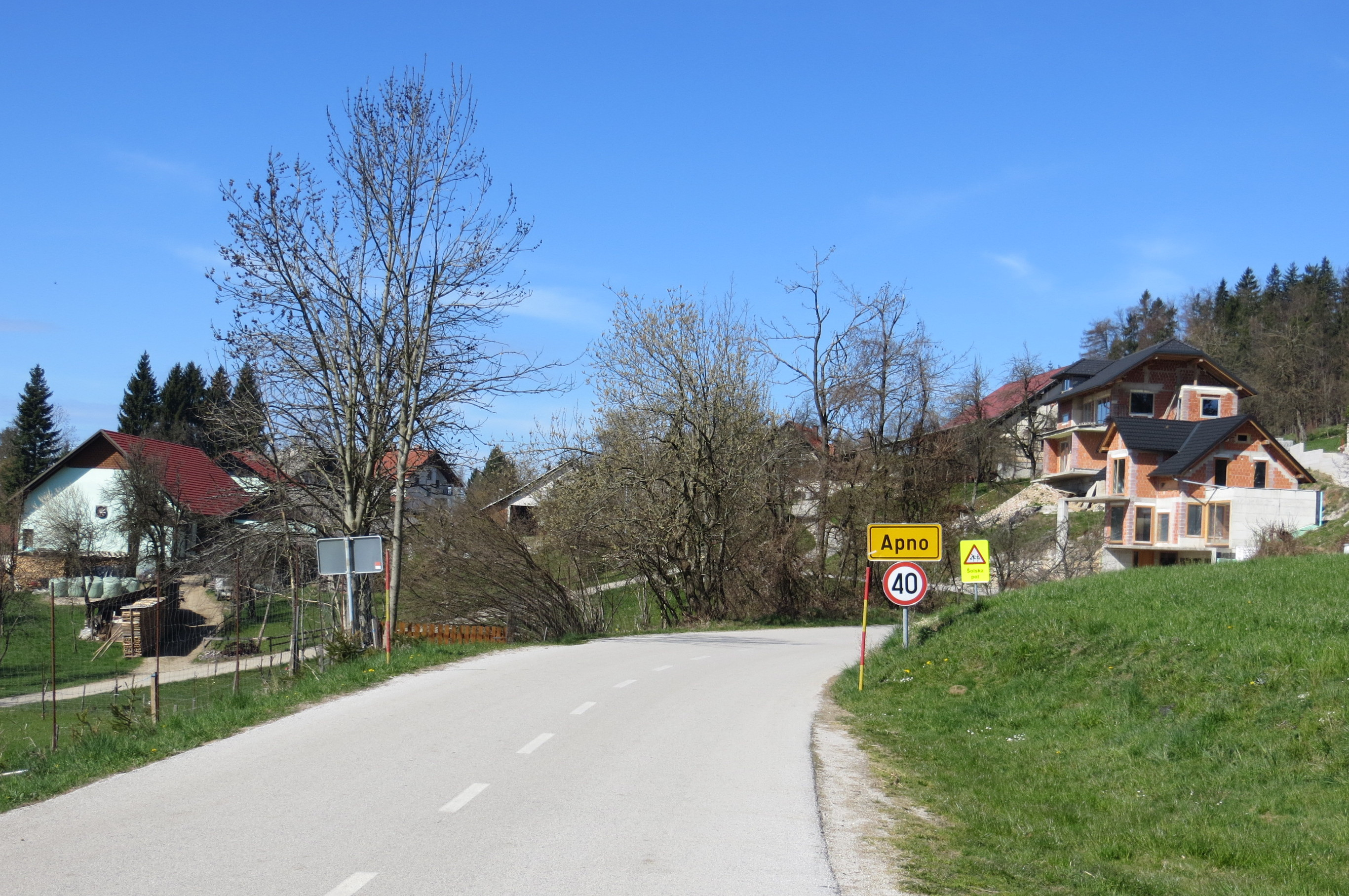

- Location in Slovenia
- Coordinates: 46°15′28.47″N 14°31′57.08″E
- Country: Slovenia
- Traditional Region: Upper Carniola
- Statistical region: Upper Carniola
- Municipality: Cerklje na Gorenjskem
- Elevation: 655.1 m (2,149 ft)

Population (2020)
  - Total: 151

Apno (pronounced [ˈaːpnɔ]; in older sources also Apne) is a settlement in the Municipality of Cerklje na Gorenjskem in the Upper Carniola region of Slovenia.

== Name ==
Apno was attested in historical sources as Calh in 1232, Chalch in 1300, and Kalich in 1426, among other spellings.
