= Adergas =

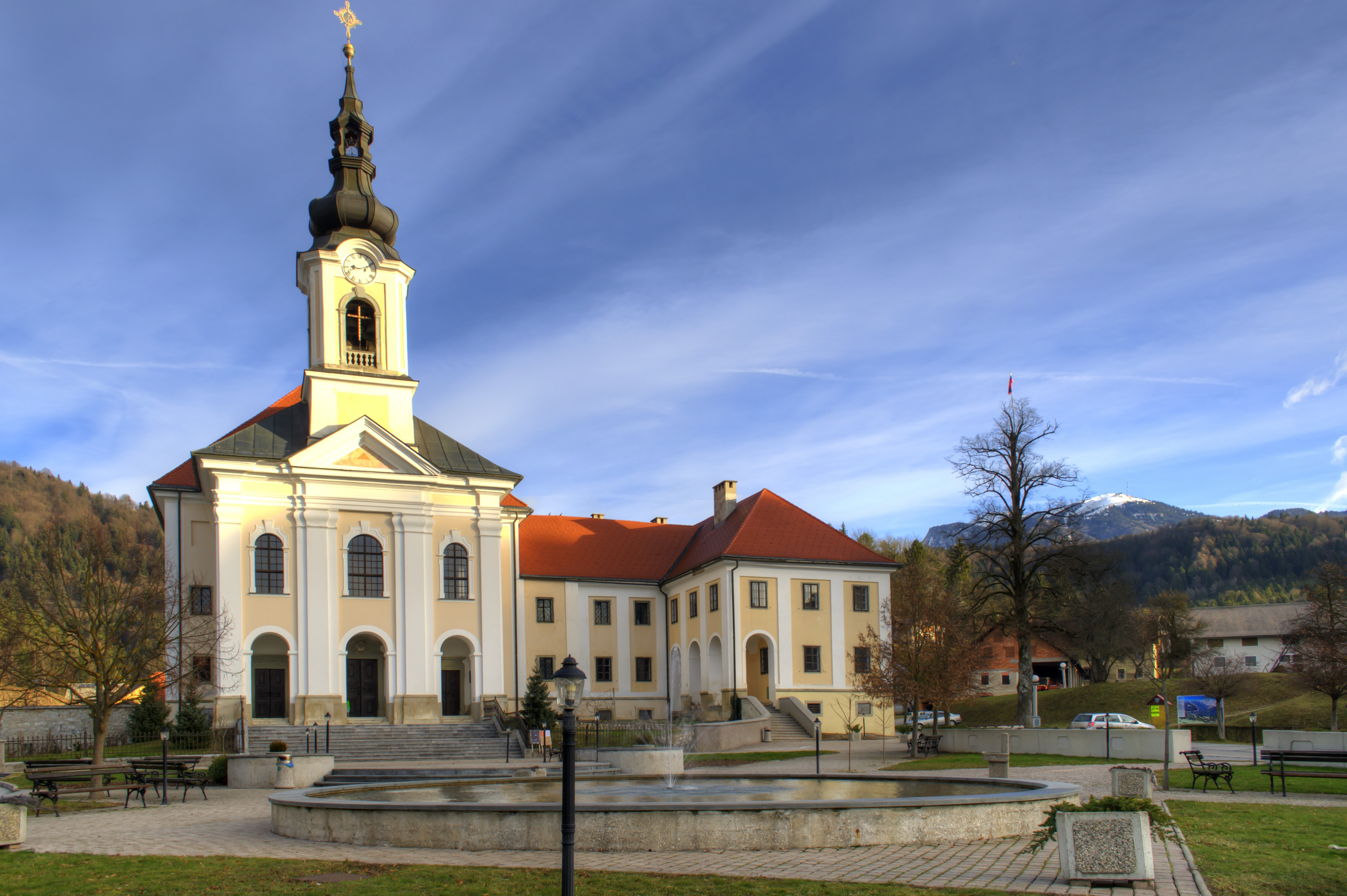
- Annunciation Church and a former Dominican convent

- Location in Slovenia
- Coordinates: 46°16′15.67″N 14°27′53.8″E
- Country: Slovenia
- Traditional Region: Upper Carniola
- Statistical region: Upper Carniola
- Municipality: Cerklje na Gorenjskem

Area
  - Total: 1.8 km^{2} (0.69 sq mi)
- Elevation: 422.7 m (1,387 ft)

Population (2020)
  - Total: 253
  - Density: 140/km^{2} (360/sq mi)

Adergas (pronounced [ˈaːdɛɾɡas]; in older sources also Adergaz, German: Adergaß) is a village in the Municipality of Cerklje na Gorenjskem in the Upper Carniola region of Slovenia.

== Velesovo Monastery ==
The Velesovo Monastery, a Dominican convent, was developed around the local church, dedicated to the Annunciation. It was founded by the Patriarchate of Aquileia in 1238, but was badly damaged in 1471 during an Ottoman raid. The current building, what was the eastern wing of the original monastery, dates to the first half of the 18th century and was erected upon the plans of the constructor expert Gregor Maček, Jr. It houses the local school, the parish offices, and a number of residences. The Baroque church of the monastery was erected in the second half of the 18th century upon the plans of the architect Candido Zulliani. It contains the oldest Medieval statue in Slovenia, the Velesovo Madonna, dated to c. 1220. The statue is a painted wooden Romanesque sculpture about half a meter tall from about 1220.

== Gallery ==
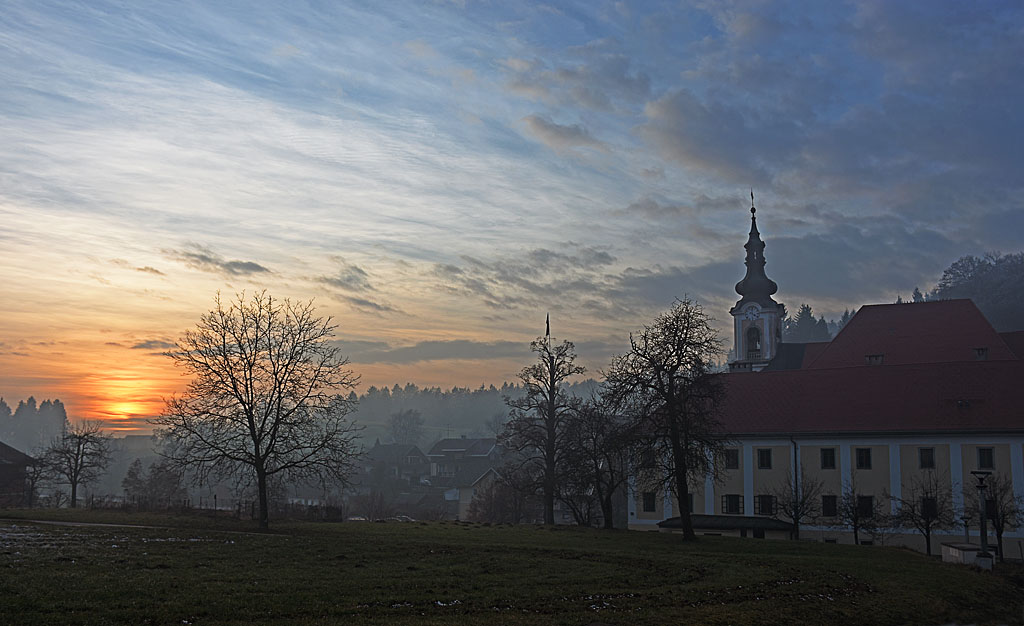
Evening in Adergas
