= Poženik =

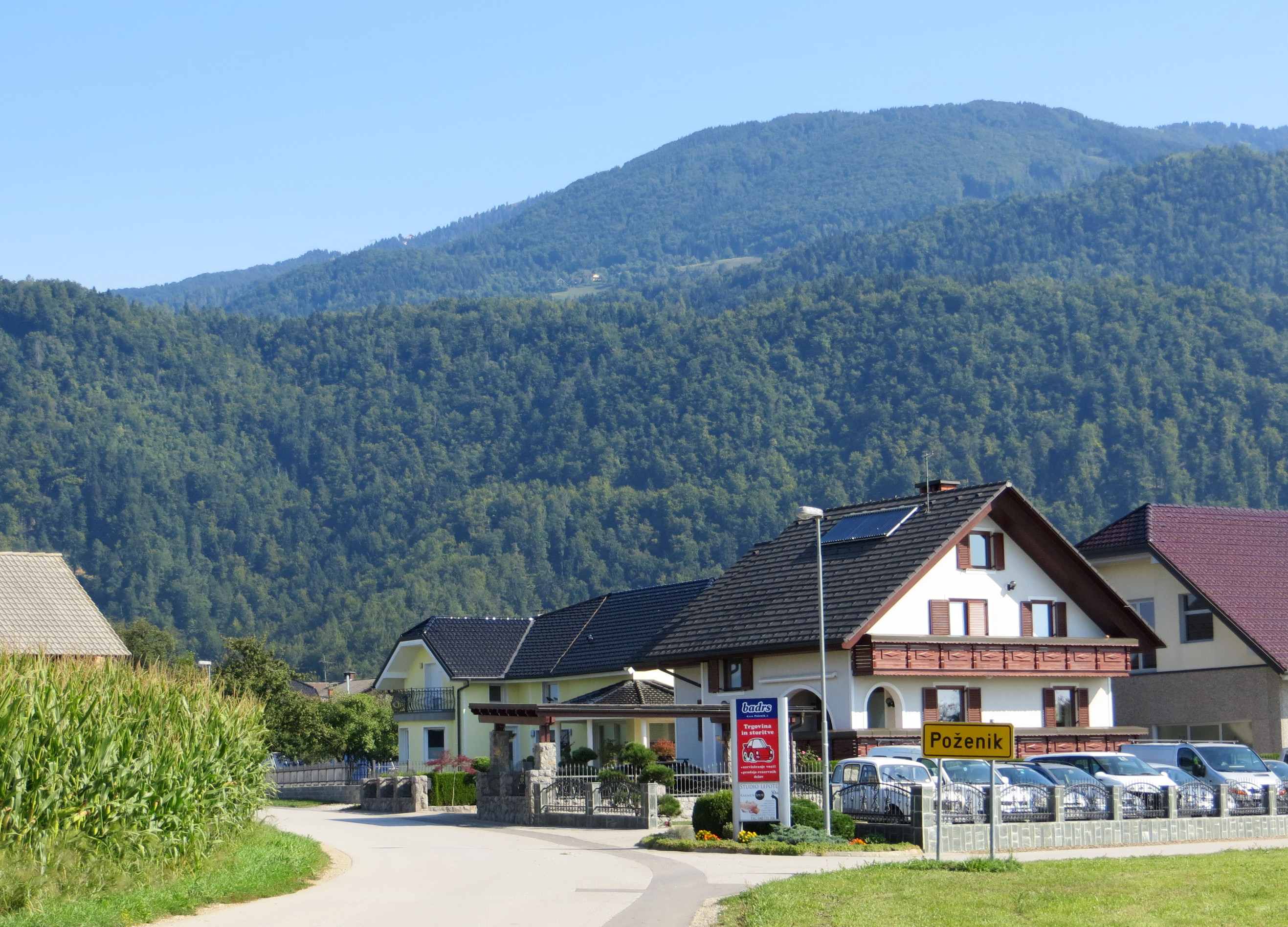

- Location in Slovenia
- Coordinates: 46°15′9.05″N 14°30′42.54″E
- Country: Slovenia
- Traditional Region: Upper Carniola
- Statistical region: Upper Carniola
- Municipality: Cerklje na Gorenjskem
- Elevation: 383.2 m (1,257 ft)

Population (2020)
  - Total: 217

Poženik (pronounced [pɔˈʒeːnik]) is a village in the Municipality of Cerklje na Gorenjskem in the Upper Carniola region of Slovenia.
