= Stiška Vas =

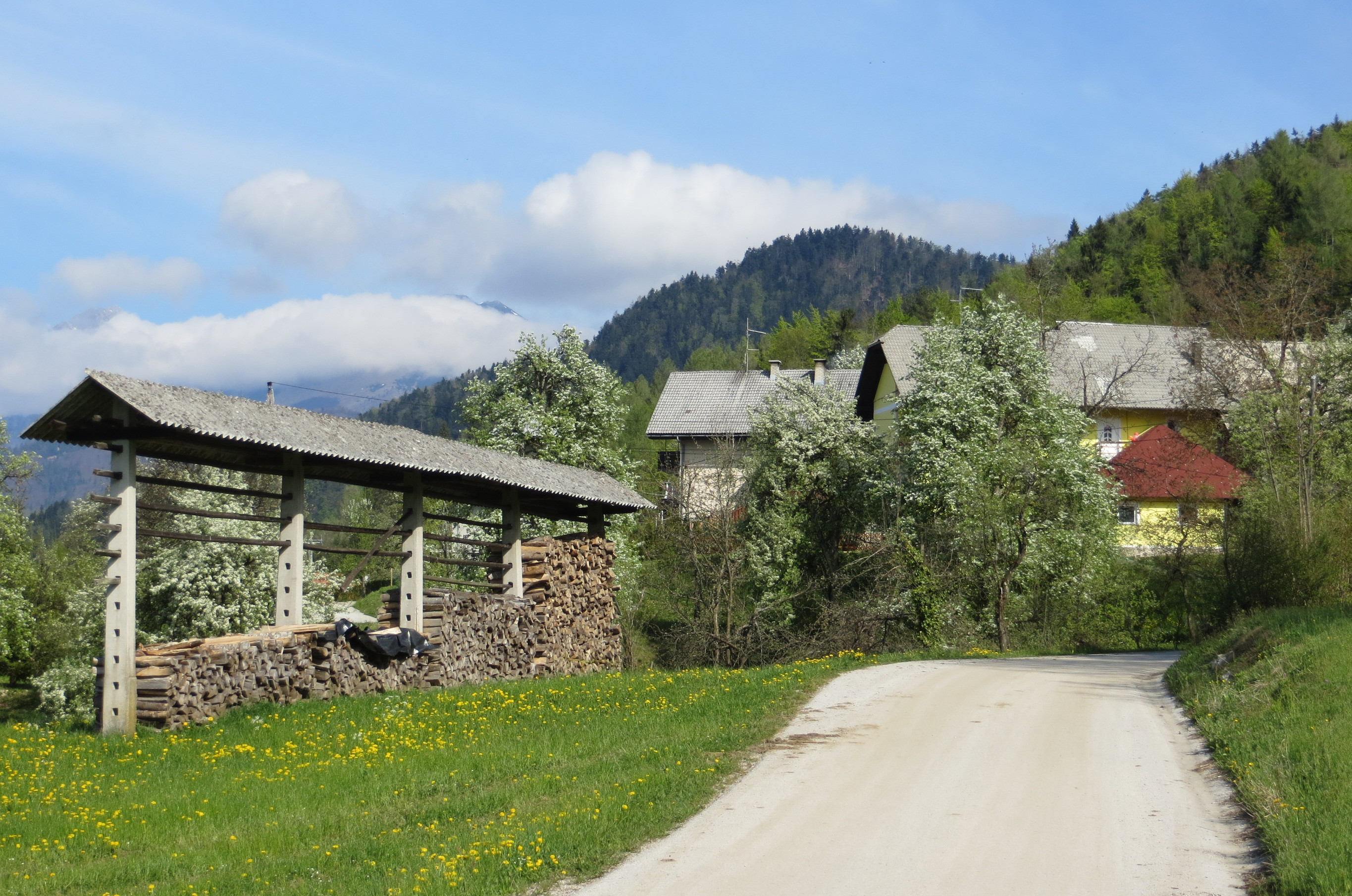

- Location in Slovenia
- Coordinates: 46°16′34.8″N 14°30′24.03″E
- Country: Slovenia
- Traditional Region: Upper Carniola
- Statistical region: Upper Carniola
- Municipality: Cerklje na Gorenjskem
- Elevation: 717 m (2,352 ft)

Population (2020)
  - Total: 106

Stiška Vas (pronounced [ˈstiːʃka ˈʋaːs]; Slovene: Stiška vas, German: Sittichsdorf) is a small settlement in the Municipality of Cerklje na Gorenjskem in the Upper Carniola region of Slovenia.

== Geography ==
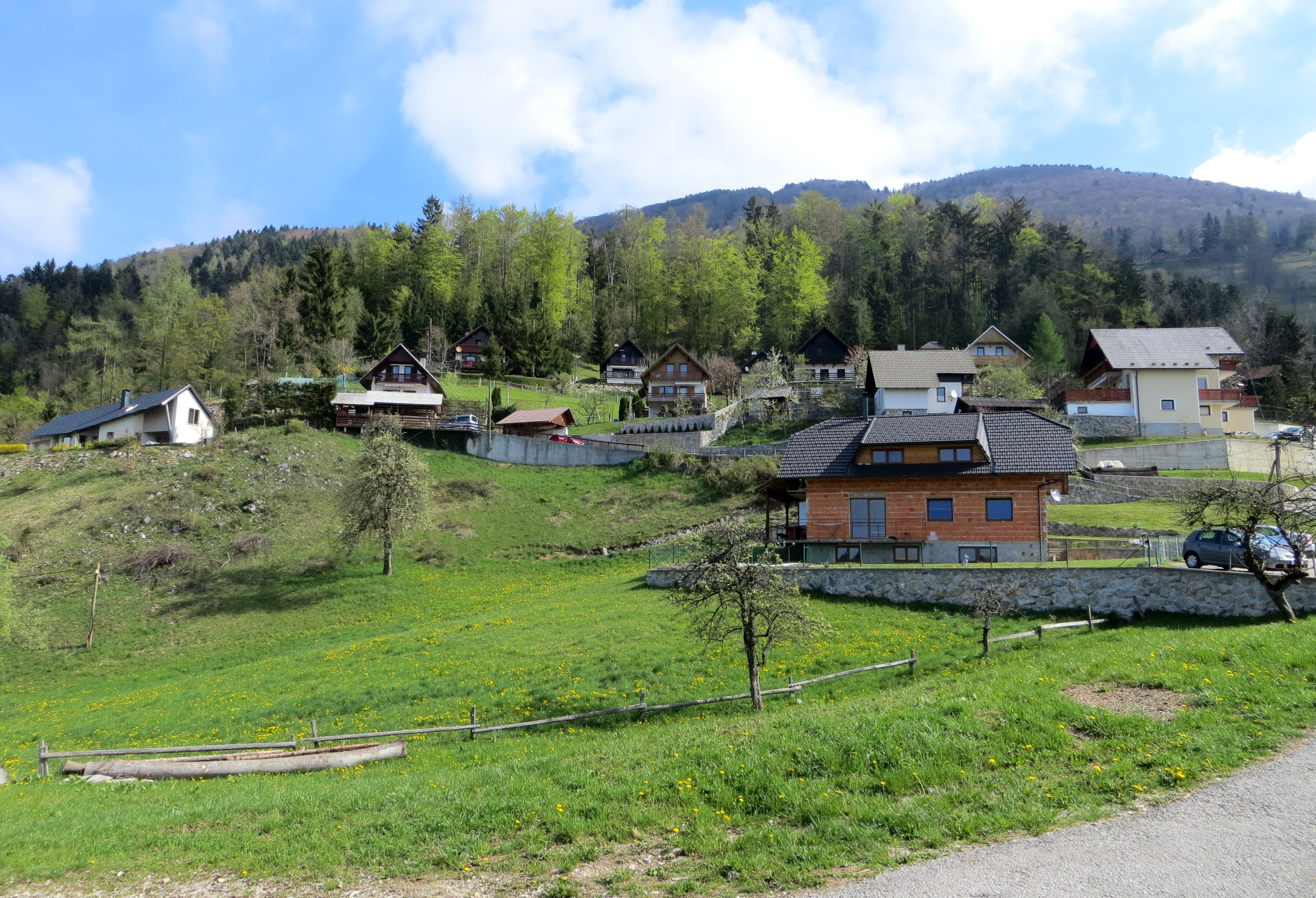
The hamlet of Škrjančevo

Stiška Vas lies on a broad terrace south of Mount Krvavec (1,853 meters or 6,079 feet) and the valley of the Reka River. In addition to the village core with the church, the settlement includes the hamlets of Hribašek to the west and Škrjančevo to the east. Šipen Hill (900 meters or 3,000 feet) rises above the village to the north.

== Name ==
The name Stiška vas appears to mean 'Stična village'. The locals explain the name as deriving from the obligation to pay a tithe to the abbey in Stična.

== Church ==
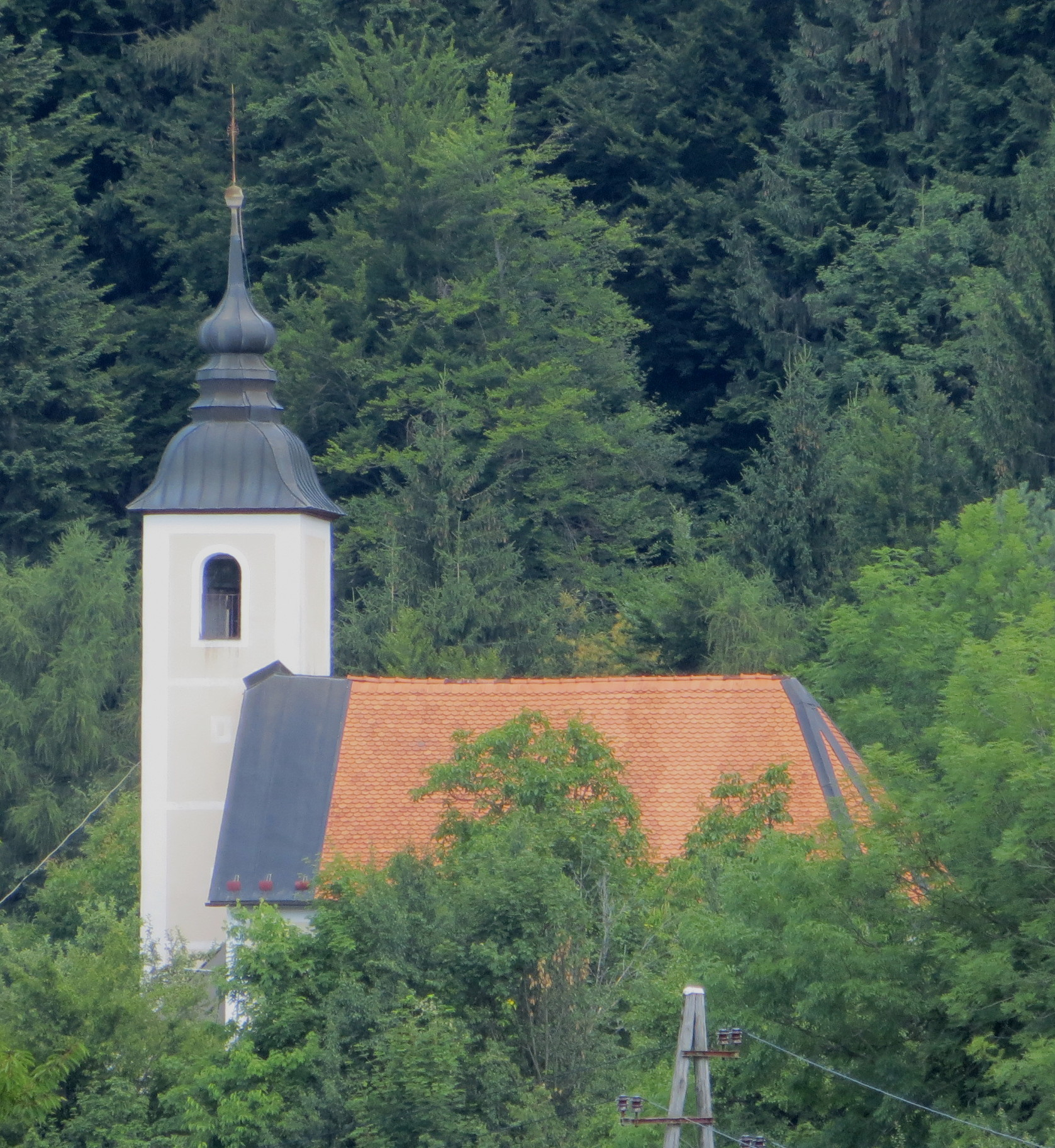
Holy Cross Church

The local church is dedicated to the Holy Cross and dates to 1751, when the old church in the center of the village was demolished and the current church was built on a small hill above the village. The church features Stations of the Cross painted by Leopold Layer (1752–1828).

== Notable people ==
Notable people that were born or lived in Stična Vas include:

- Ivan Železnikar (1839–1892), editor and journalist

== Gallery ==
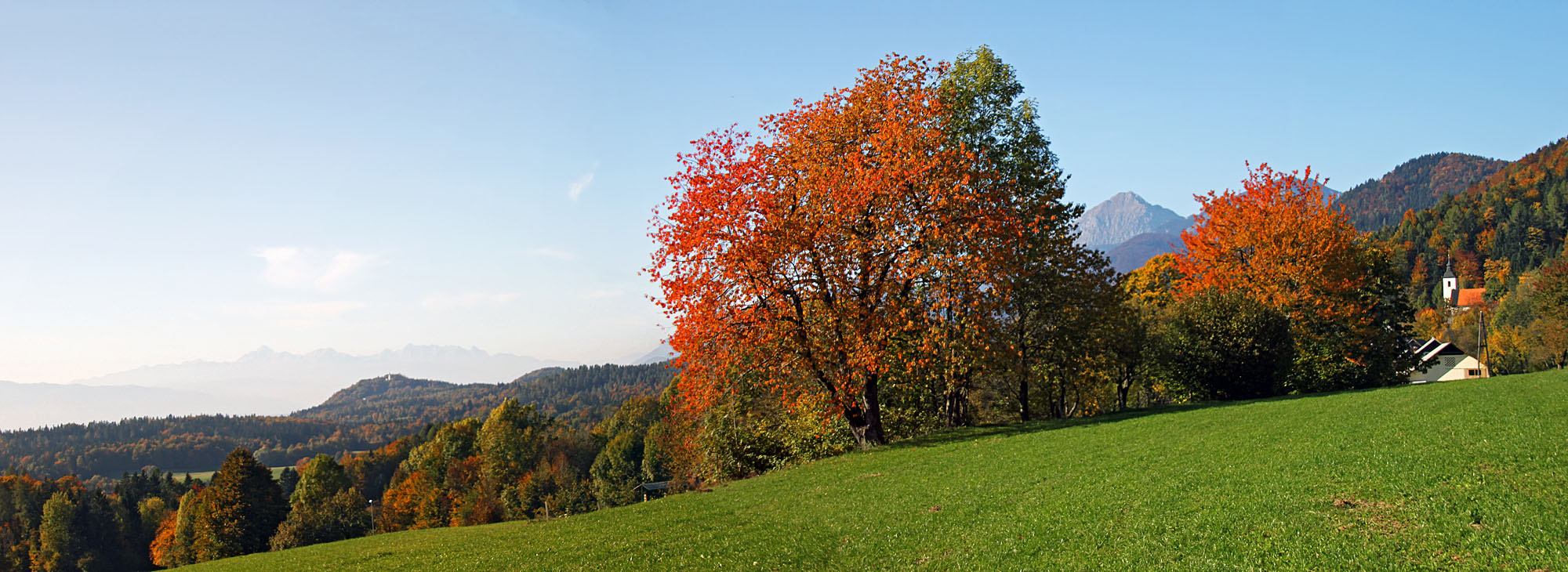
Stiška Vas in autumn
