= Glinje, Cerklje na Gorenjskem =

Glinje
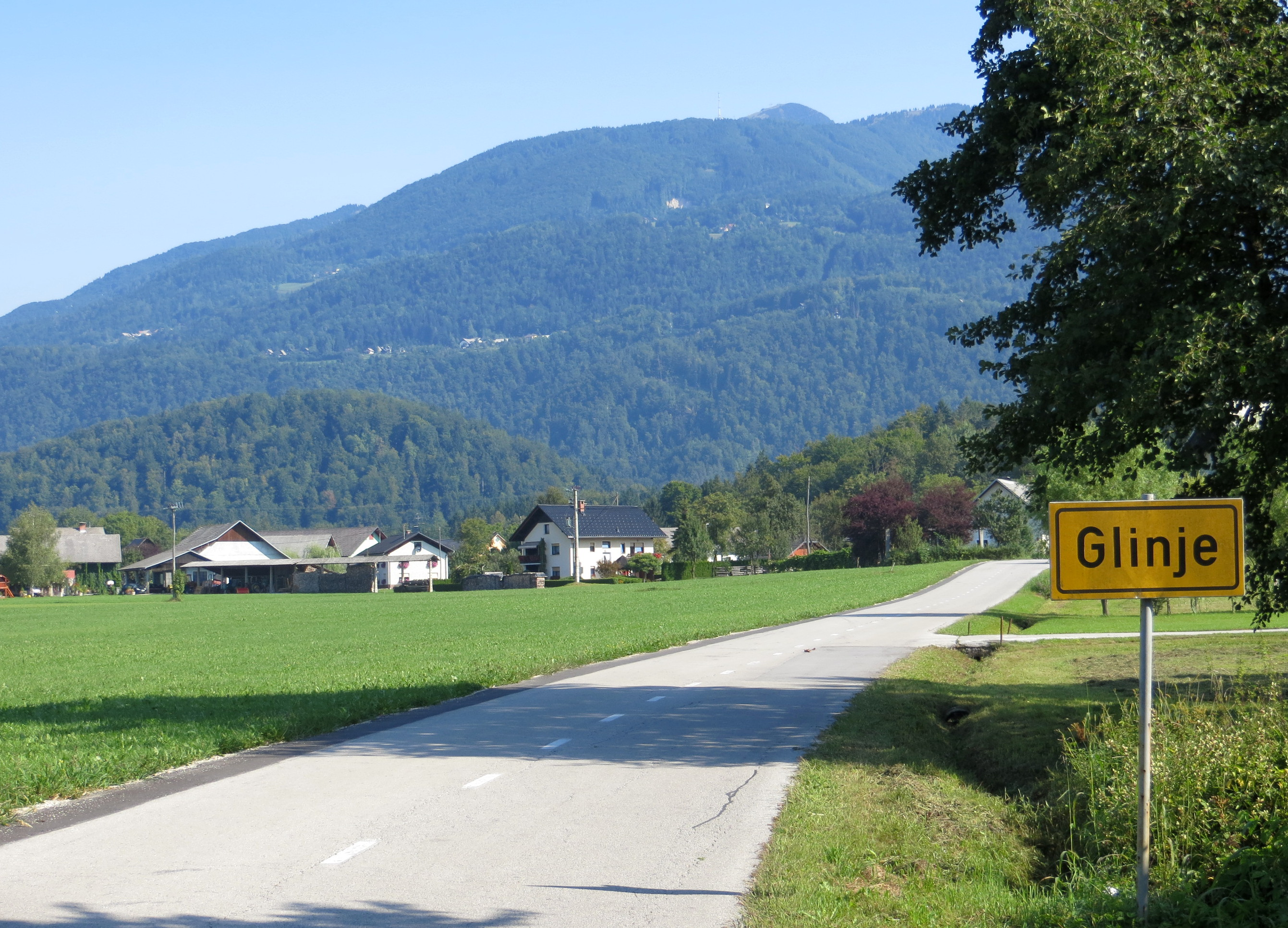

- Location in Slovenia
- Coordinates: 46°14′20.59″N 14°31′12.38″E
- Country: Slovenia
- Traditional Region: Upper Carniola
- Statistical region: Upper Carniola
- Municipality: Cerklje na Gorenjskem
- Elevation: 364.5 m (1,196 ft)

Population (2020)
  - Total: 110

Glinje (pronounced [ˈɡliːnjɛ]) is a small settlement in the Municipality of Cerklje na Gorenjskem in the Upper Carniola region of Slovenia.
