= Viševca =

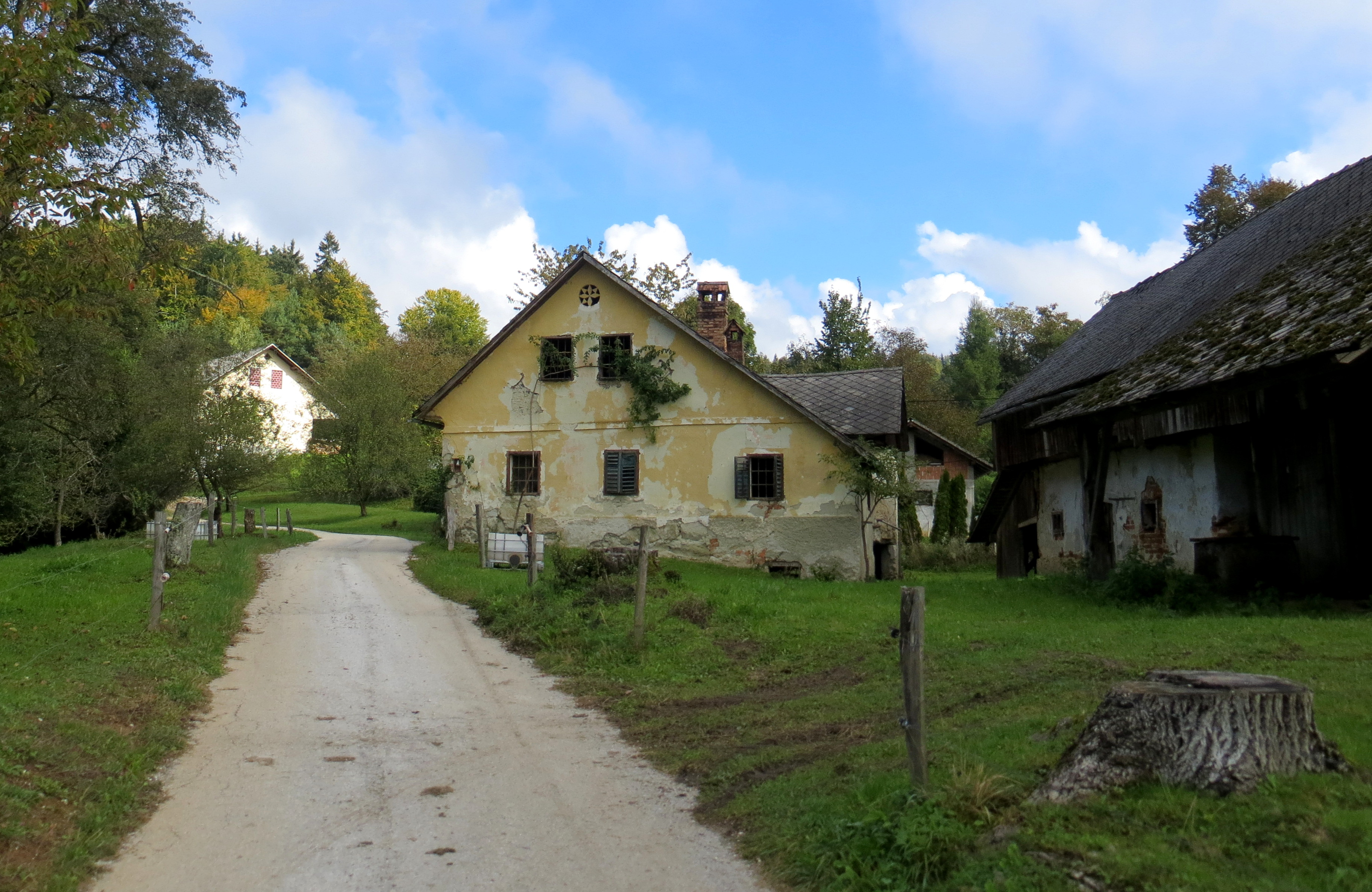

- Location in Slovenia
- Coordinates: 46°14′58.75″N 14°33′40.05″E
- Country: Slovenia
- Traditional Region: Upper Carniola
- Statistical region: Upper Carniola
- Municipality: Cerklje na Gorenjskem
- Elevation: 477.5 m (1,567 ft)

Population (2020)
  - Total: 1

Viševca (pronounced [ʋiˈʃeːu̯tsa]; in older sources also Uševica, German: Uscheuze) is a small settlement in the Municipality of Cerklje na Gorenjskem in the Upper Carniola region of Slovenia.
