= Municipality of Cerklje na Gorenjskem =

Municipality of Slovenia

Municipality of Cerklje na Gorenjskem Občina Cerklje na Gorenjskem
- Municipality
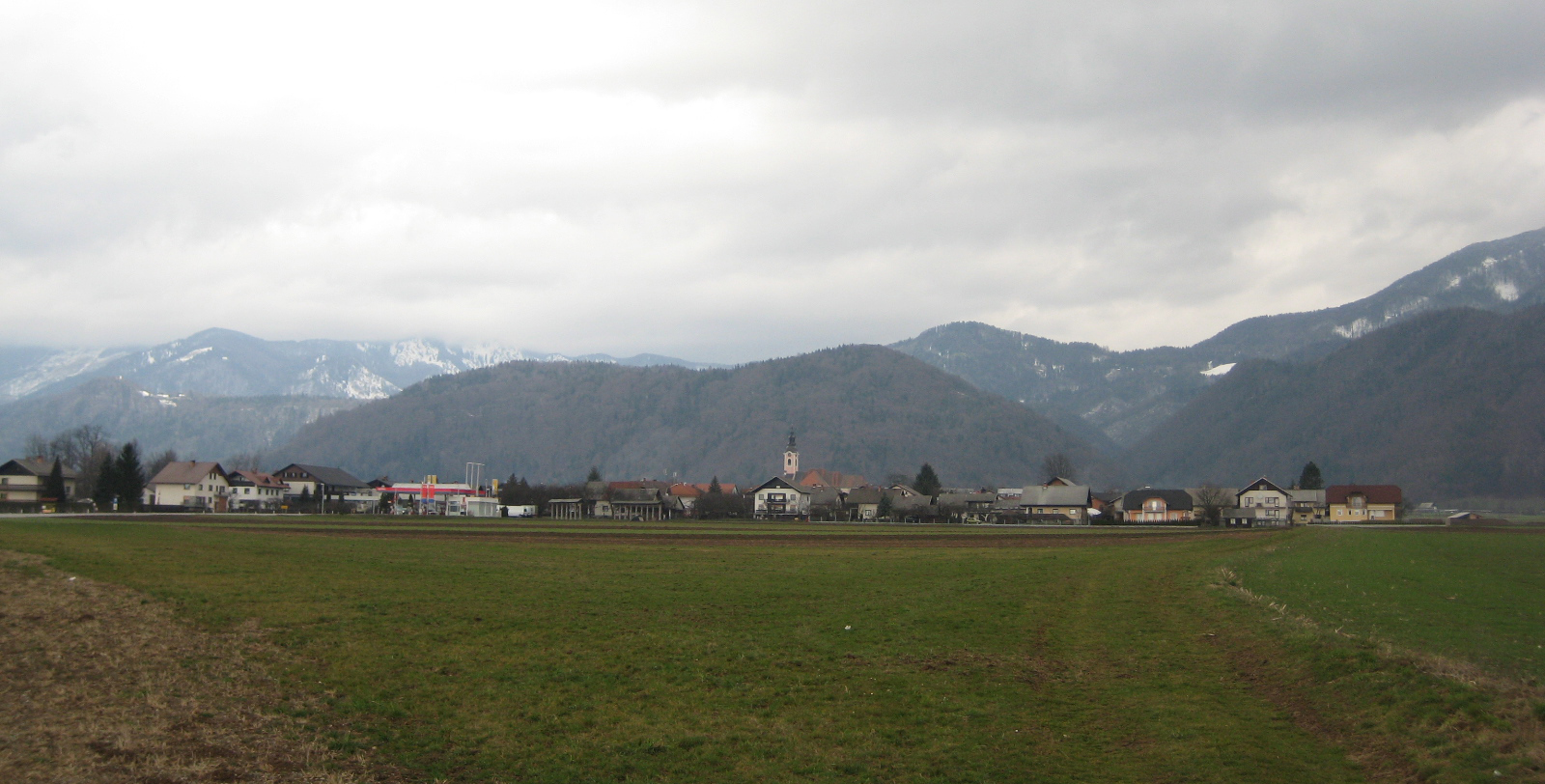

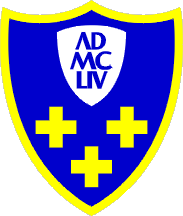
- Flag Coat of arms

- Location of the Municipality of Cerklje na Gorenjskem in Slovenia
- Coordinates: 46°15′N 14°29′E
- Country: Slovenia

Government
  - Mayor: Franc Čebulj ( Independent)

Area
  - Total: 78 km^{2} (30 sq mi)

Population (2019)
  - Total: 7,712
  - Density: 99/km^{2} (260/sq mi)
- Demonym: Cerkljan (-ka)
- Time zone: UTC+01 (CET)
  - Summer (DST): UTC+02 (CEST)
- Postal code of Slovenia: 4207
- Website: www.cerklje.si

The Municipality of Cerklje na Gorenjskem (pronounced [tsɛɾˈklɛ na ɡɔˈɾeːnskɛm]; Slovene: Občina Cerklje na Gorenjskem) is a municipality in Slovenia. The seat of the municipality is the town of Cerklje na Gorenjskem.

== Settlements ==
In addition to the municipal seat of Cerklje na Gorenjskem, the municipality also includes the following settlements:

- Adergas
- Ambrož pod Krvavcem
- Apno
- Cerkljanska Dobrava
- Češnjevek
- Dvorje
- Glinje
- Grad
- Lahovče
- Poženik
- Praprotna Polica
- Pšata
- Pšenična Polica
- Ravne
- Šenturška Gora
- Sidraž
- Šmartno
- Spodnji Brnik
- Štefanja Gora
- Stiška Vas
- Sveti Lenart
- Trata pri Velesovem
- Vašca
- Velesovo
- Viševca
- Vopovlje
- Vrhovje
- Zalog pri Cerkljah
- Zgornji Brnik

== Airport ==
Ljubljana Airport is located near the village of Zgornji Brnik in the municipality.

== See also ==
- Krvavec Ski Resort
