= Spodnji Brnik =

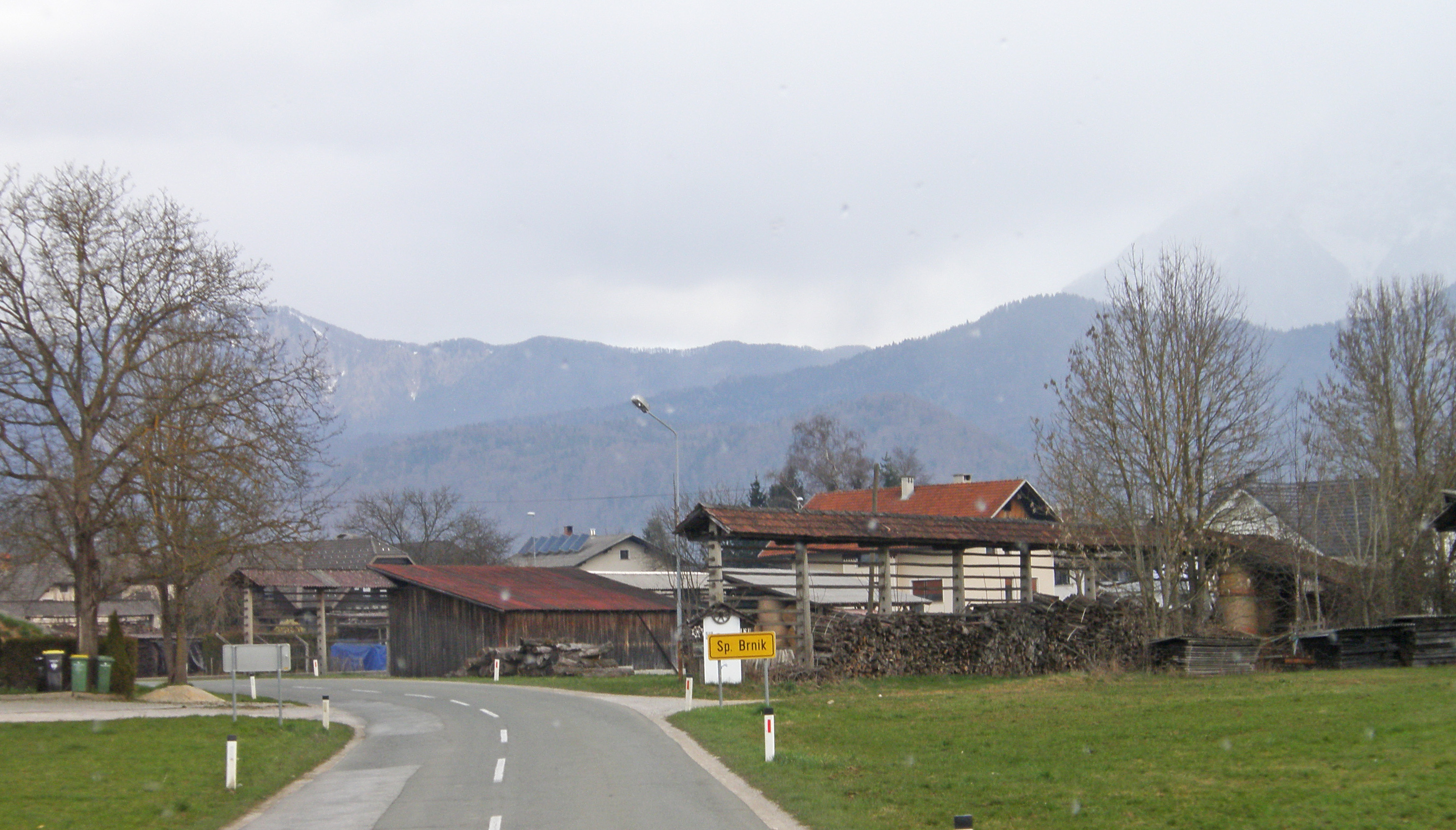

- Location in Slovenia
- Coordinates: 46°13′50.94″N 14°29′18.28″E
- Country: Slovenia
- Traditional Region: Upper Carniola
- Statistical region: Upper Carniola
- Municipality: Cerklje na Gorenjskem
- Elevation: 366.5 m (1,202 ft)

Population (2020)
  - Total: 479

Spodnji Brnik (pronounced [ˈspoːdnji ˈbərːnik]; in older sources also Spodnji Bernik, German: Unterfernig) is a settlement in the Municipality of Cerklje na Gorenjskem in the Upper Carniola region of Slovenia.

Spodnji Brnik is also the closest settlement to Ljubljana Jože Pučnik Airport, commonly known as Brnik Airport.

== Church ==
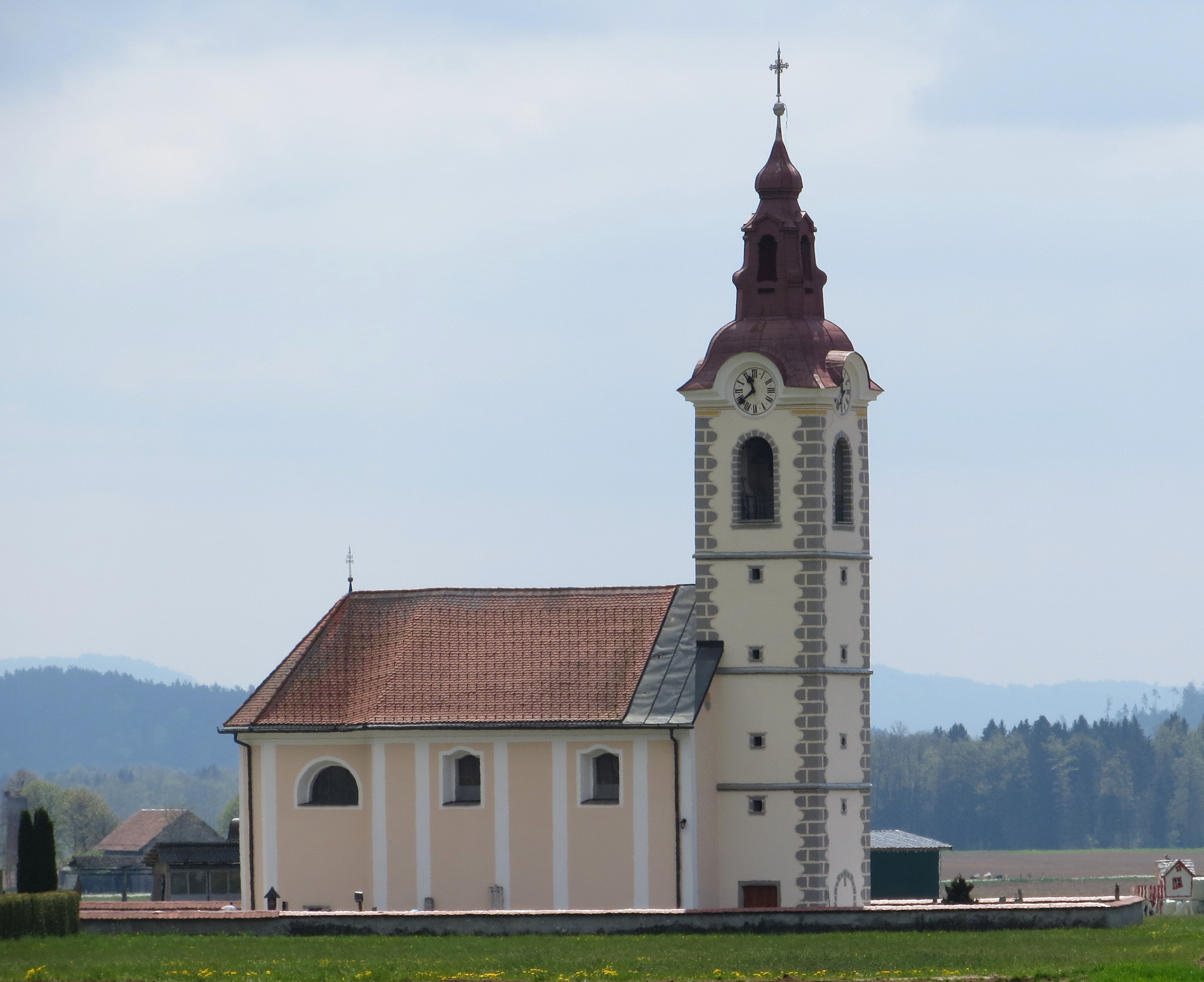
Saints Simon and Jude Church

The local church is dedicated to Saints Simon and Jude and was first mentioned in documents from 1511, when it was extended and dedicated, its predecessor on the site probably dating to the early Middle Ages.

== Notable people ==
Notable people that were born or lived in Spodnji Brnik include:

- Lojze Ilija (1905–1982), writer
