= Lahovče =

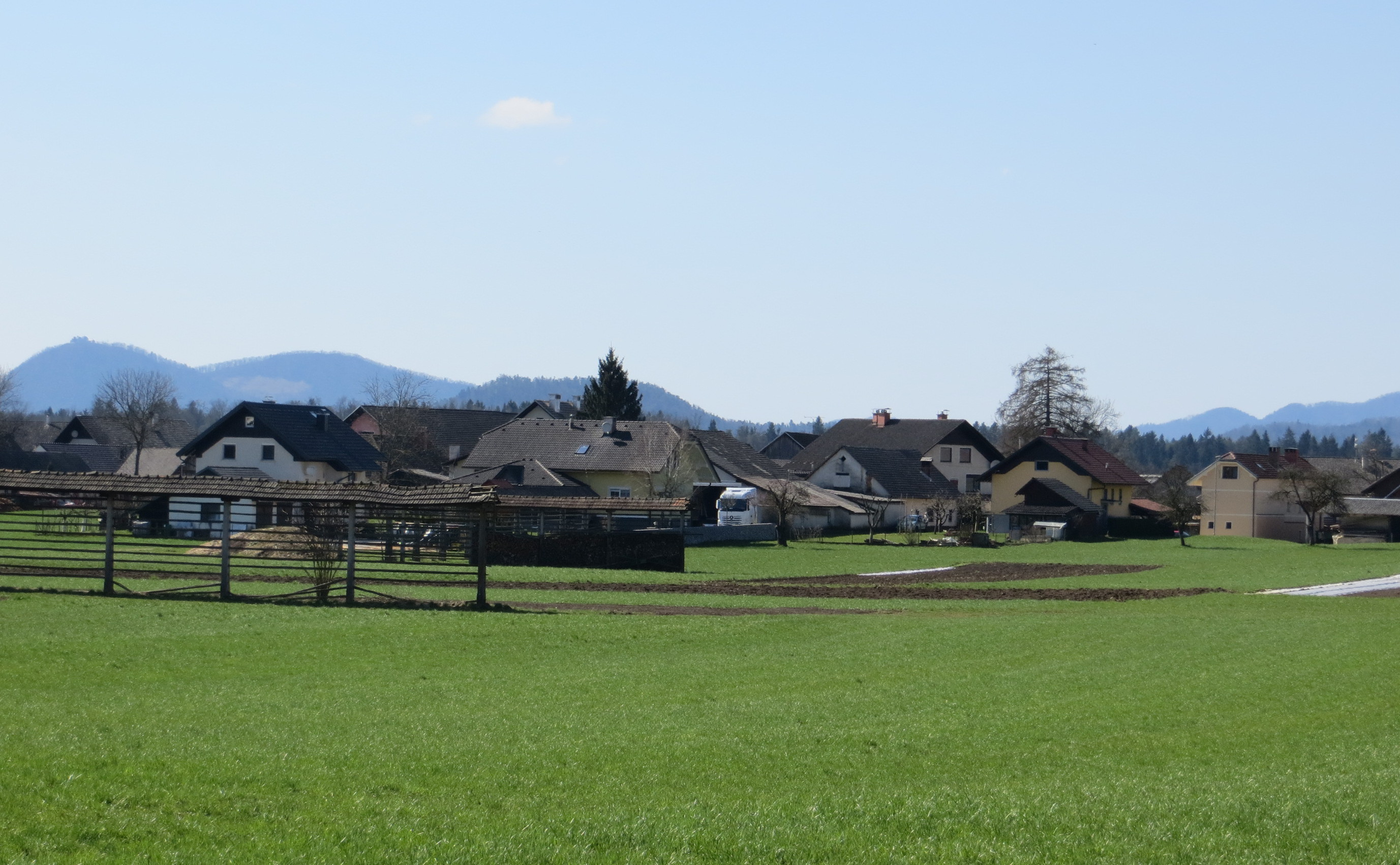

- Location in Slovenia
- Coordinates: 46°13′14.87″N 14°30′15.17″E
- Country: Slovenia
- Traditional Region: Upper Carniola
- Statistical region: Upper Carniola
- Municipality: Cerklje na Gorenjskem
- Elevation: 354.3 m (1,162 ft)

Population (2020)
  - Total: 464

Lahovče (pronounced [ˈlaːxɔu̯tʃɛ]; in older sources also Lahoviče, German: Lachowitsch) is a village in the Municipality of Cerklje na Gorenjskem in the Upper Carniola region of Slovenia.

== Geography ==
Lahovče is a clustered village along Reka Creek. The intermittent channel of Voje Creek lies above the village to the northeast. Both creeks are tributaries of the Pšata River. The part of the village near the inn is named Pod Budno. Fields surround the village and are also known by microtoponyms; those to the northeast, towards Zalog pri Cerkljah, are named Pod Vogam, to the south Ilovico and Lačenberg, and to the east, toward Nasovče, Novine. The soil is sandy and fertile.

== Name ==
The name Lahovče is derived from the root Lah, today usually 'Italian' but also meaning 'pre-Slavic settler'. The latter meaning is the source of the name, referring to a village inhabited at one time by non-Slovenes.

== History ==
Roman pitchers and urns were found in Kalvarija Meadow south of the village at the beginning of the 20th century, testifying to early settlement of the area.

During the Second World War, four Partisans were killed on 4 October 1944 in the Cerklje Plain (Slovene: Cerkljansko polje). A monument commemorating the men stands in front of the village church.

In 1966, Britannia Airways Flight 105 crashed in the woods outside Lahovče, killing 98 of the 117 passengers and crew. This is still the worst aircraft crash in Slovenia ever.

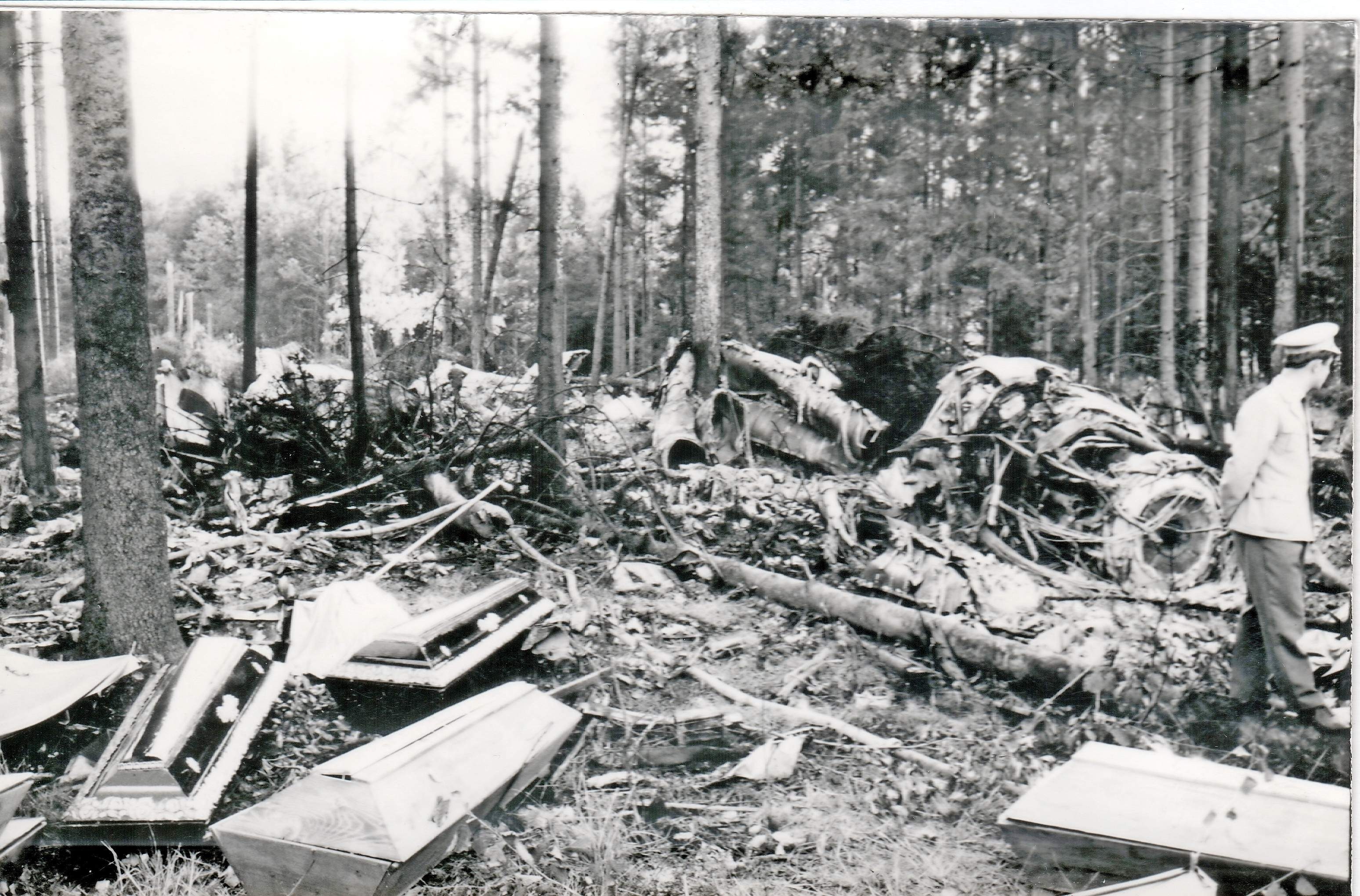
Flight 105 crash, 1966

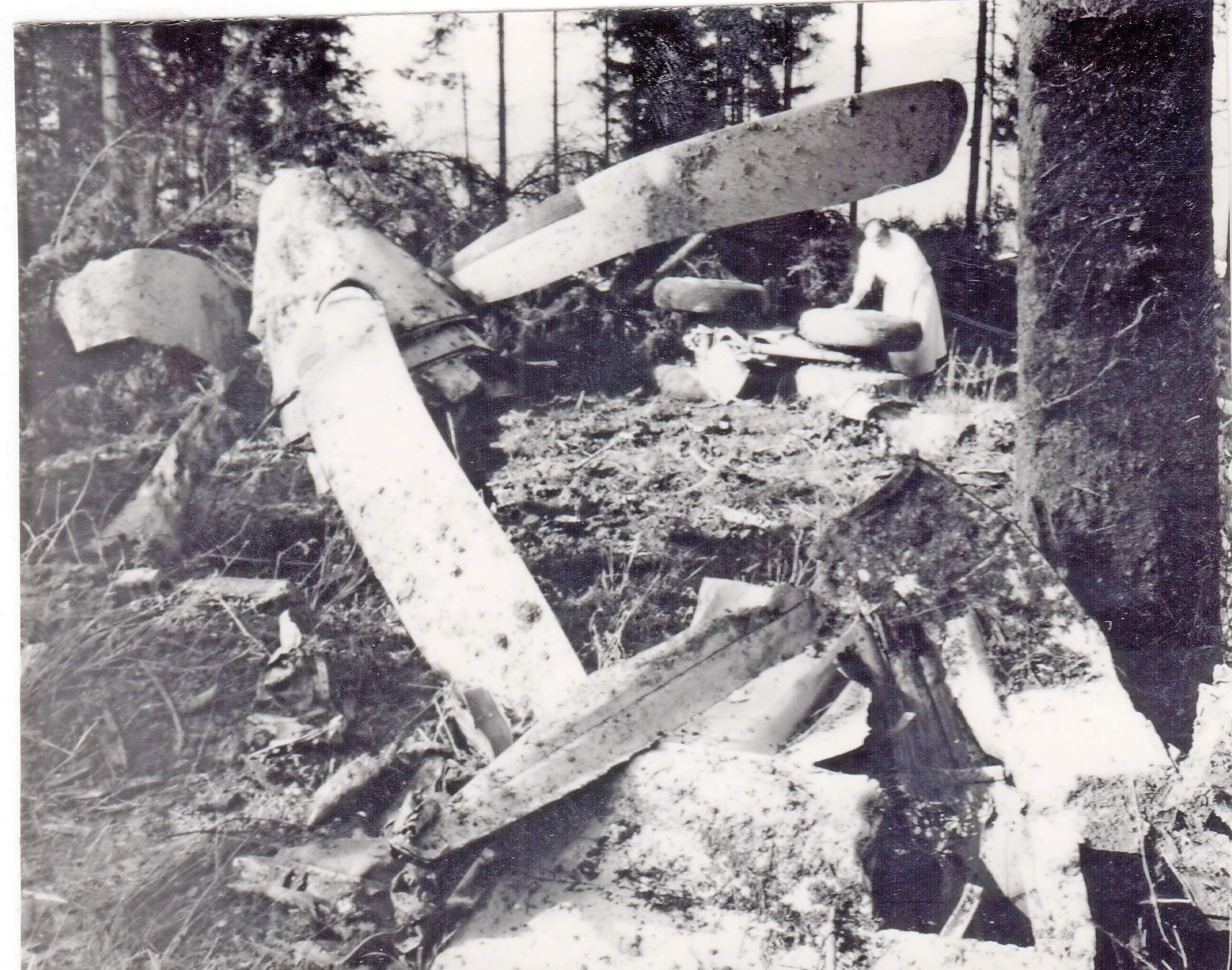
Flight 105 crash, 1966

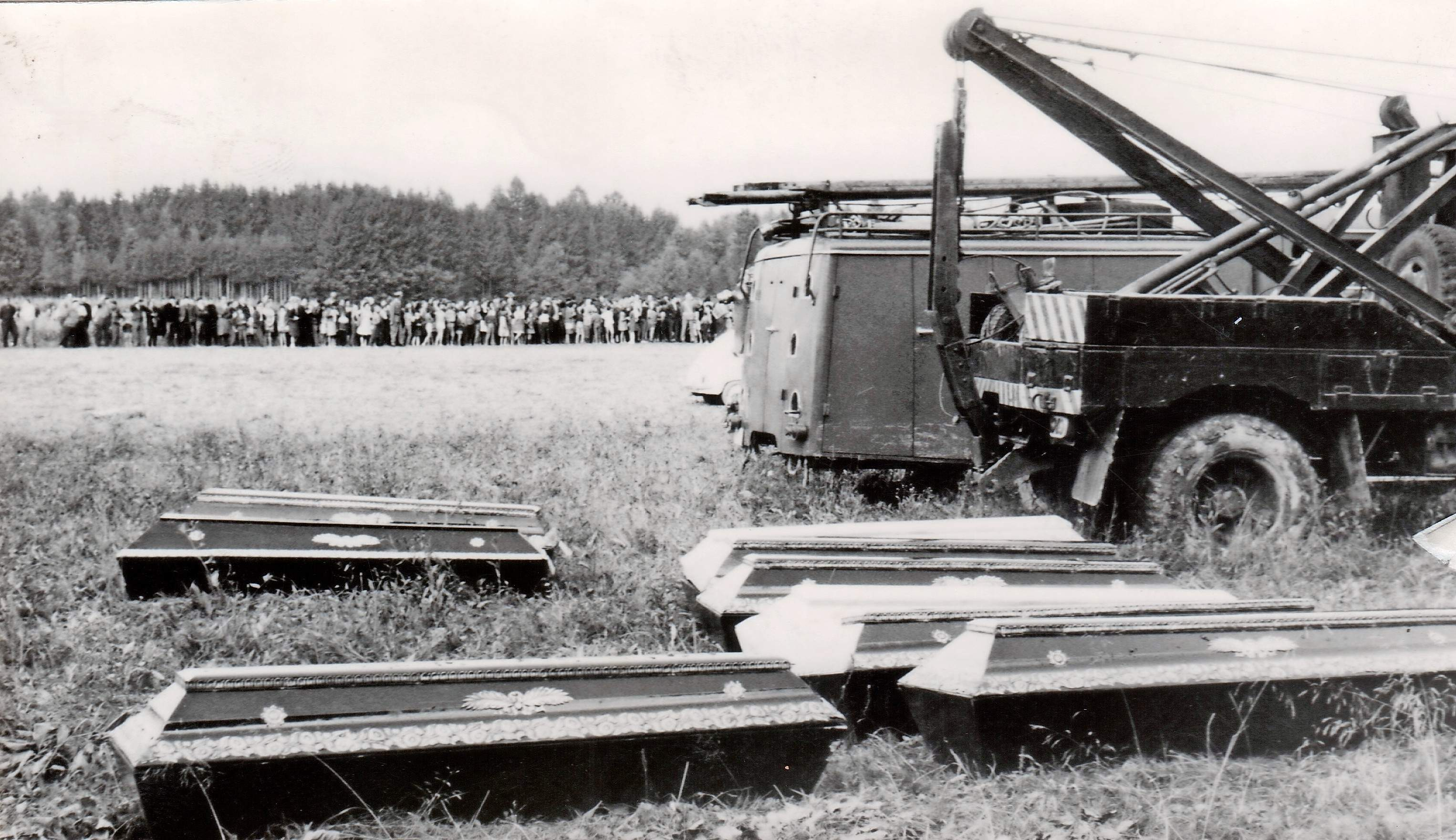
Flight 105 crash, 1966

== Church ==
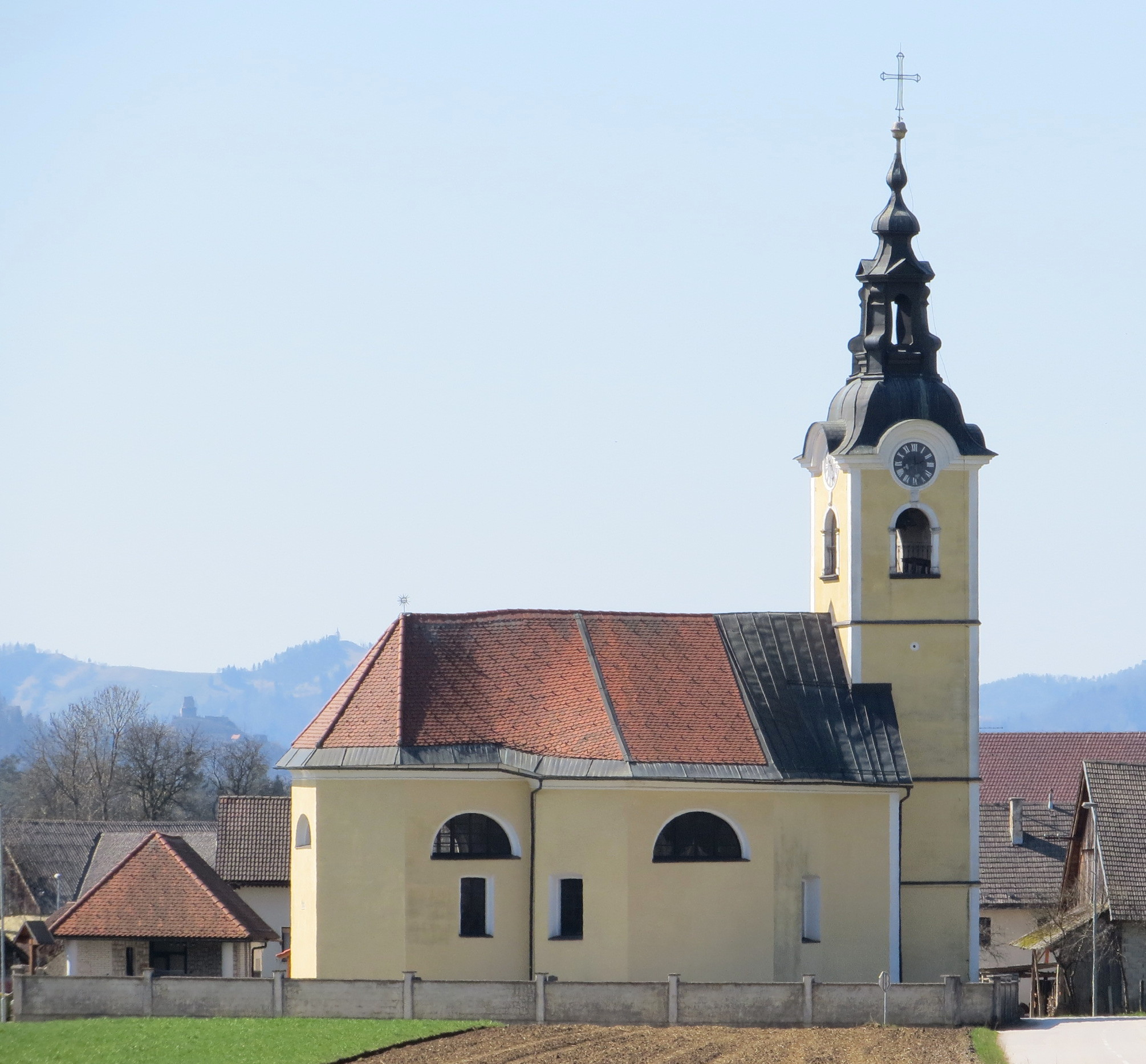
Saint Florian's Church

The local church is dedicated to Saint Florian and belongs to the Parish of Cerklje na Gorenjskem. It dates from the 17th century and was renovated in 1830.

== Lahovče Pond ==
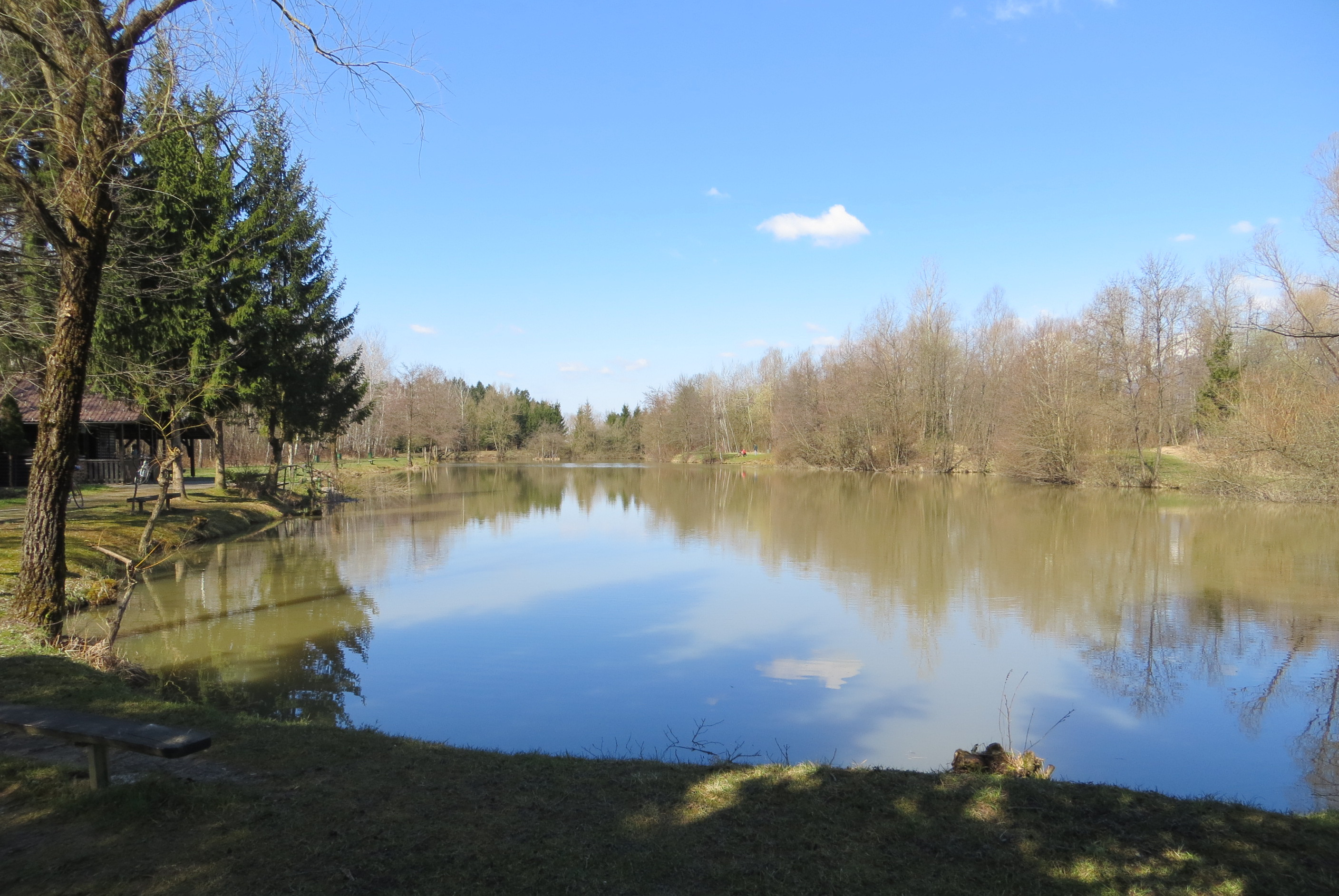
Lahovče Pond

Lahovče Pond (Slovene: ribnik Lahovče or Lahovški ribnik) lies north of the village. Fishing is possible in the pond year round, and it is used for other recreational activities. The locals often use it for summer or winter gatherings.
