= Grad, Cerklje na Gorenjskem =

Grad
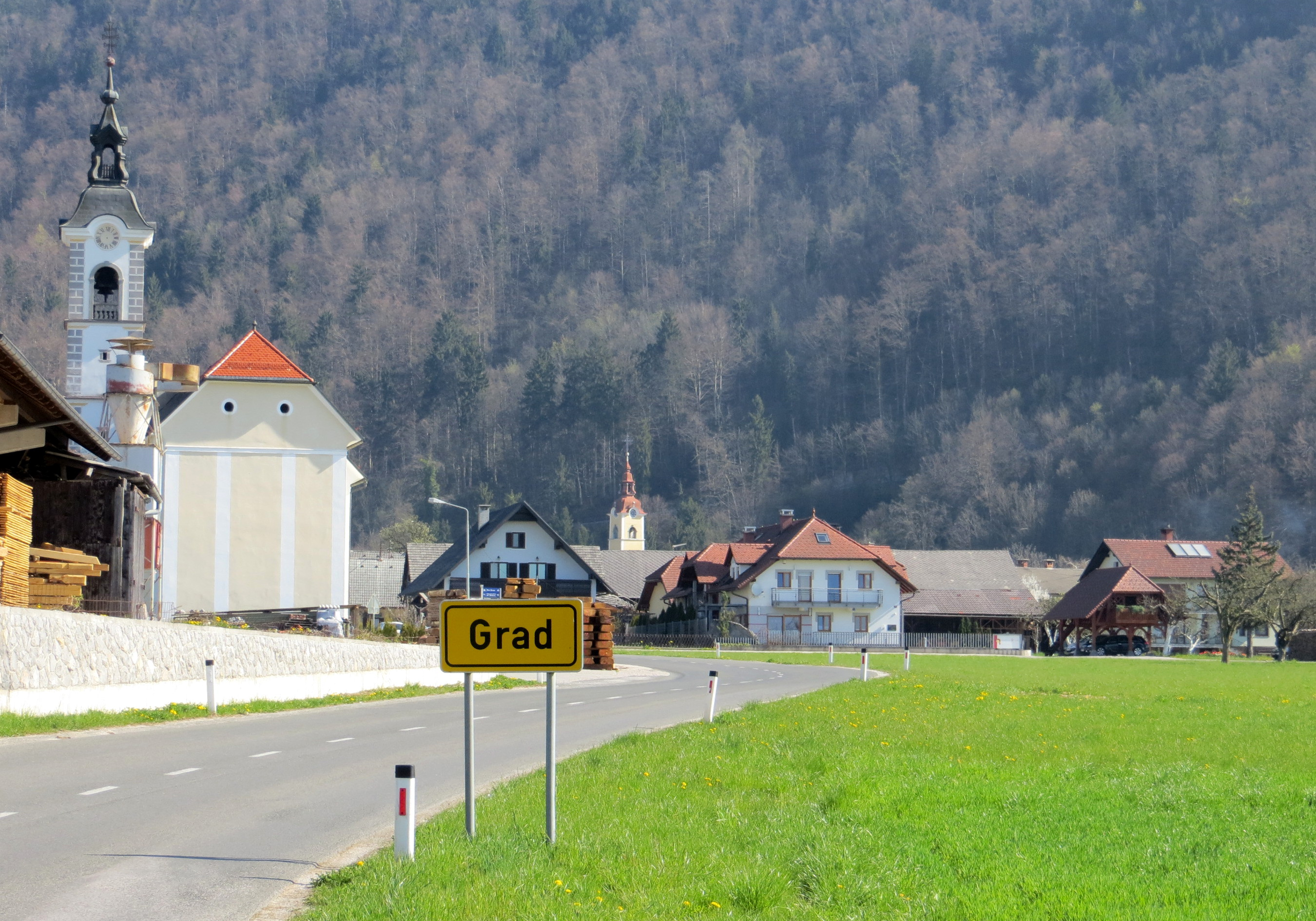

- Location in Slovenia
- Coordinates: 46°15′44.06″N 14°29′35.45″E
- Country: Slovenia
- Traditional Region: Upper Carniola
- Statistical region: Upper Carniola
- Municipality: Cerklje na Gorenjskem
- Elevation: 429.9 m (1,410 ft)

Population (2020)
  - Total: 257

Grad (pronounced [ˈɡɾaːt]) is a village in the Municipality of Cerklje na Gorenjskem in the Upper Carniola region of Slovenia.

== Church ==
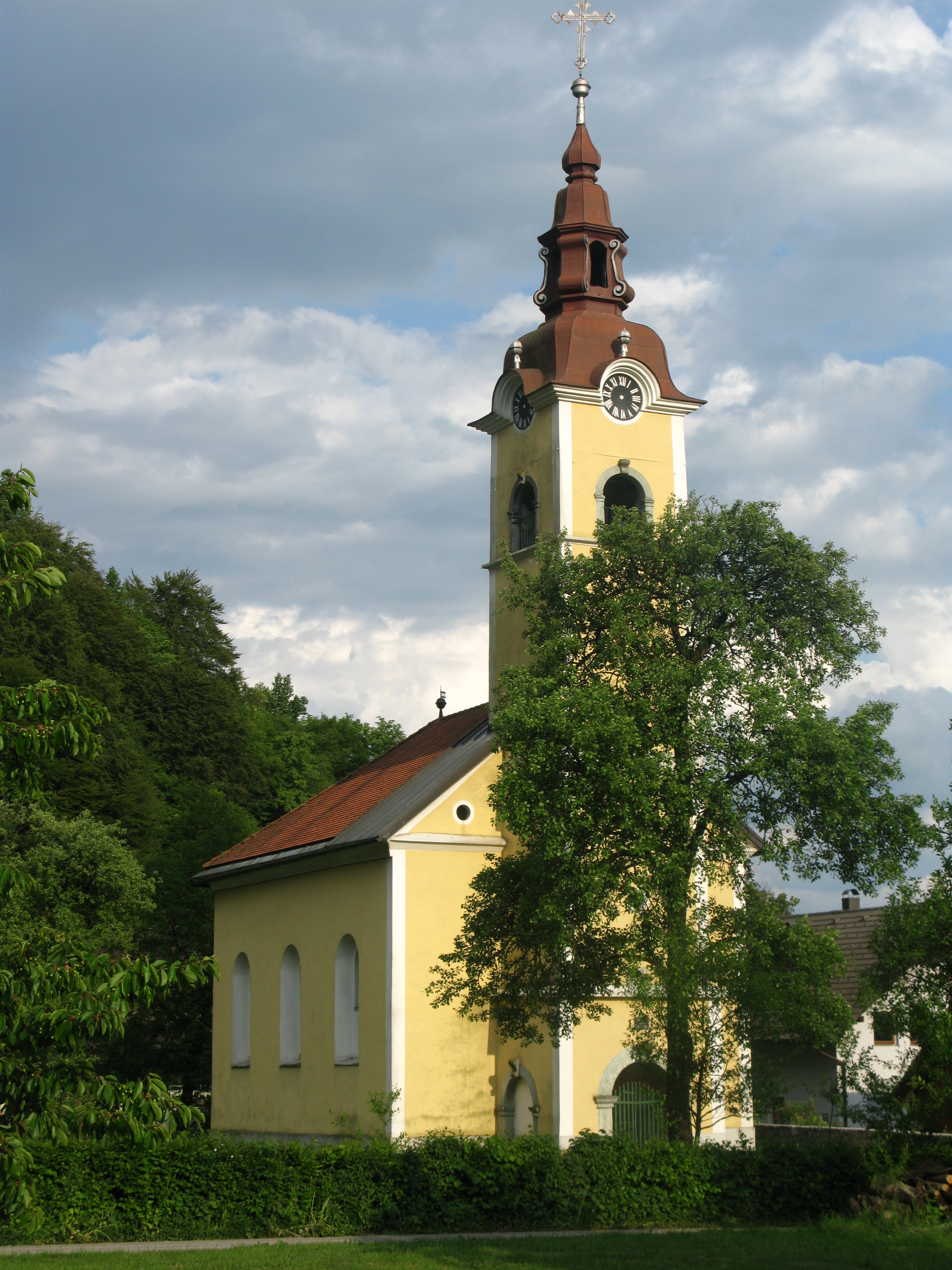
Saint Helena's Church

The local church is dedicated to Saint Helena and the current building is from the late 17th century with later alterations, but is likely built over earlier foundations with a reused stone in the belfry inscribed with the date 1426.
