= Praprotna Polica =

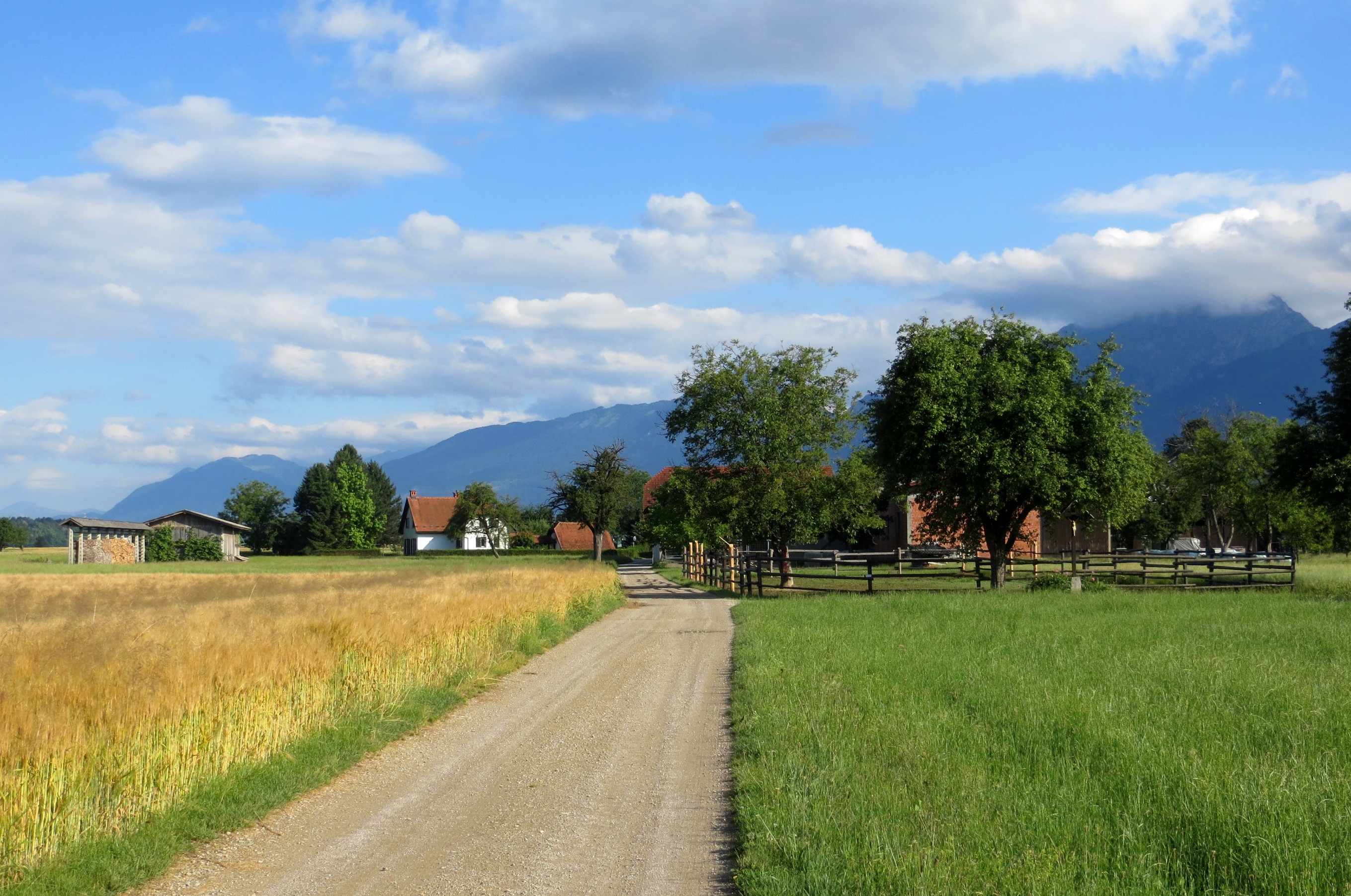

- Location in Slovenia
- Coordinates: 46°15′15.85″N 14°27′7.69″E
- Country: Slovenia
- Traditional Region: Upper Carniola
- Statistical region: Upper Carniola
- Municipality: Cerklje na Gorenjskem
- Elevation: 406.3 m (1,333 ft)

Population (2020)
  - Total: 209

Praprotna Polica (pronounced [ˈpɾaːpɾɔtna pɔˈliːtsa]; German: Oberfeld) is a village in the Municipality of Cerklje na Gorenjskem in the Upper Carniola region of Slovenia.
