= Pšenična Polica =

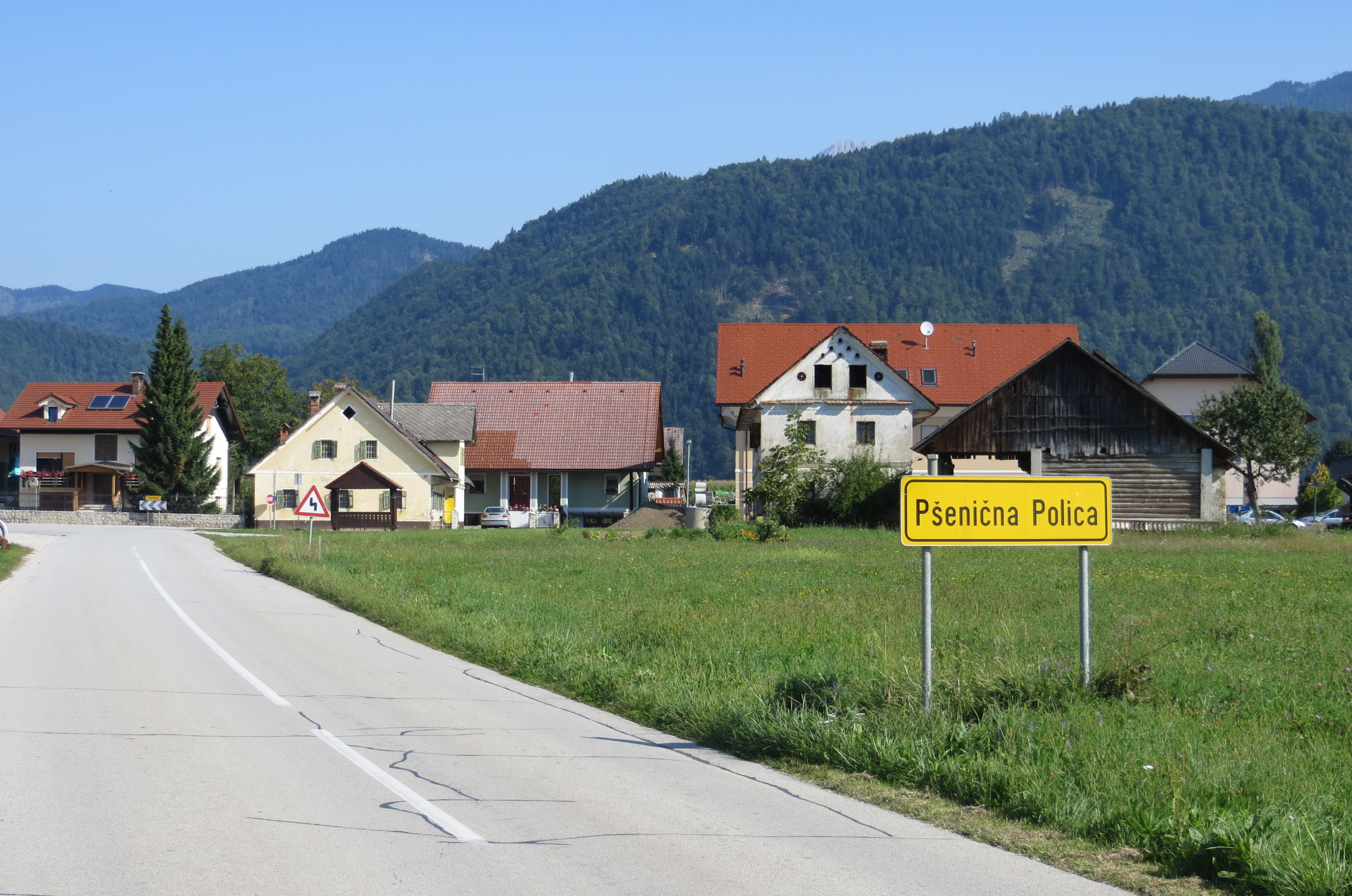

- Location in Slovenia
- Coordinates: 46°14′52″N 14°29′54.6″E
- Country: Slovenia
- Traditional Region: Upper Carniola
- Statistical region: Upper Carniola
- Municipality: Cerklje na Gorenjskem
- Elevation: 386.9 m (1,269 ft)

Population (2020)
  - Total: 114

Pšenična Polica (pronounced [pʃɛˈniːtʃna pɔˈliːtsa]; German: Niederfeld) is a settlement in the Municipality of Cerklje na Gorenjskem in the Upper Carniola region of Slovenia.
