= Šenturška Gora =

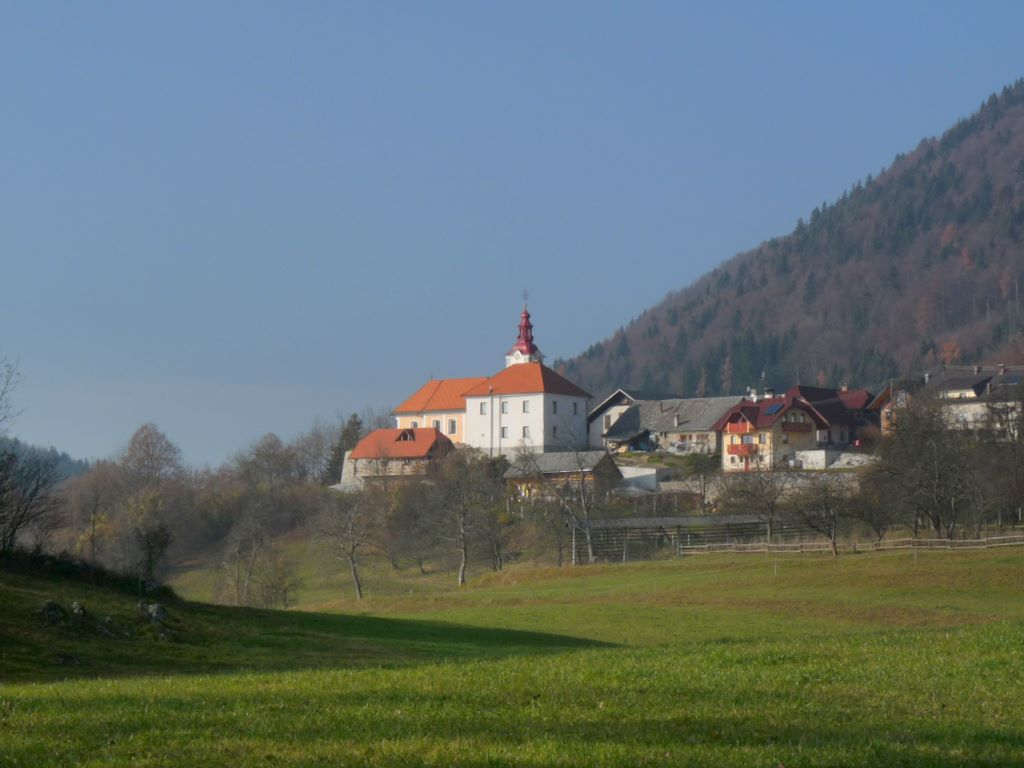

- Location in Slovenia
- Coordinates: 46°15′30.27″N 14°32′42.83″E
- Country: Slovenia
- Traditional Region: Upper Carniola
- Statistical region: Upper Carniola
- Municipality: Cerklje na Gorenjskem

Area
  - Land: 2.6 km^{2} (1.0 sq mi)
- Elevation: 666.7 m (2,187 ft)

Population (2020)
  - Total: 183
  - Density: 70/km^{2} (180/sq mi)
- Postal code: 4207

Šenturška Gora (Slovene: [ʃɛnˈtuːɾʃka ˈɡɔːɾa] or [ʃənˈtuːɾʃka ˈɡɔːɾa]; German: Ulrichsberg) is a small settlement in the Municipality of Cerklje na Gorenjskem in the Upper Carniola region of Slovenia.

The local church is dedicated to Saint Ulrich, thus the name of the village (literally, 'Mount Saint Ulrich'). It was built in 1368 and extended in the late 17th century.
