= Naklo =

Naklo may refer to several places:

== Czech Republic ==
- Náklo, a village in Olomouc District and Region of the Czech Republic.

== Germany ==
- Nakło nad Pianą, Polish name for the town of Anklam, Germany

== Poland ==
- Nakło nad Notecią, a town in Kuyavian-Pomeranian Voivodeship, north-central Poland
- Nakło, Opole Voivodeship (southwest Poland)
- Nakło, Częstochowa County in Silesian Voivodeship (south Poland)
- Nakło, Gliwice County in Silesian Voivodeship (south Poland)
- Nakło, Tarnowskie Góry County in Silesian Voivodeship (south Poland)
- Nakło, Subcarpathian Voivodeship (south-east Poland)

== Slovenia ==
- Naklo, Črnomelj, a village in southeastern Slovenia
- Naklo, Divača, a village in southwestern Slovenia
- Naklo, Naklo, a town in northwestern Slovenia
- Municipality of Naklo, a municipality in northwestern Slovenia
- Kalce–Naklo, a village in eastern Slovenia
- Malo Naklo, a village in northwestern Slovenia
