= Žeje =

Žeje may refer to a number of settlements in Slovenia:

- Žeje, Domžale, a settlement in the Municipality of Domžale central Slovenia
- Žeje, Naklo, a settlement in the Municipality of Naklo, northwestern Slovenia
- Žeje, Postojna, a settlement in the Municipality of Postojna, southwestern Slovenia
- Žeje pri Komendi, a settlement in the Municipality of Komenda, central Slovenia
