= Dolenja Vas, Naklo =

Dolenja Vas
- Location in Slovenia
- Coordinates: 46°17′24.28″N 14°16′48.52″E
- Country: Slovenia
- Traditional region: Upper Carniola
- Statistical region: Upper Carniola
- Municipality: Naklo
- Elevation: 438 m (1,437 ft)

Dolenja Vas (pronounced [dɔˈleːnja ˈʋaːs]; Slovene: Dolenja vas, German: Unterbirkendorf) is a former settlement in the Municipality of Naklo in the Upper Carniola region of Slovenia. It is now part of the village of Podbrezje. It was a large village on steeply eroded terraces south of the main settlement of Podbrezje.

== Name ==
Dolenja vas literally means 'lower village'. This name and names like it are common in Slovenia and other Slavic countries, and they indicate that the settlement lay at a lower elevation than nearby settlements. In the past it was known as Unterbirkendorf in German.

== History ==
Dolenja Vas was annexed by the village of Podbrezje in 1953, ending its existence as a separate settlement.

== Notable people ==
Notable people that were born or lived in Dolenja Vas include:

- Peter Pavlin (1853–1933), beekeeper
