= Britof, Naklo =

Britof
- Location in Slovenia
- Coordinates: 46°18′6.97″N 14°16′28.38″E
- Country: Slovenia
- Traditional region: Upper Carniola
- Statistical region: Upper Carniola
- Municipality: Naklo
- Elevation: 463 m (1,519 ft)

Britof (pronounced [ˈbɾiːtɔf]; in older sources also Britof pri Taboru, German: Freithof bei Tabor) is a former settlement in the Municipality of Naklo in the Upper Carniola region of Slovenia. It is now part of the village of Podbrezje. Britof consists of a sparse row of houses along the transition between the upper and middle terraces above the right bank of the Tržič Bistrica River (Slovene: Tržiška Bistrica).

== Name ==
The name Britof is shared with other settlements in Slovenia and is derived from the Slovene common noun britof 'cultivated fenced area'. This was borrowed from Middle High German vrîthof, also meaning 'cultivated fenced area'. The denotation of the common noun in both languages later developed from this original meaning to 'churchyard' and then to 'cemetery'. In the past, the settlement was known as Freithof bei Tabor in German.

== History ==
Britof was annexed by the village of Podbrezje in 1953, ending its existence as a separate settlement.

== Church ==
The church in Britof is dedicated to Saint James (Slovene: sveti Jakob) and is the seat of the Parish of Podbrezje. The church dates from before 1400. It was remodeled and reconsecrated in 1654. The exterior of the building is Gothic, but the altars are Renaissance. The church contains paintings of Saint James and Saint Francis Xavier by Leopold Layer (1752–1828), as well as a painting of the Virgin Mary by Ivana Kobilca. The furnishings of the church are modern. The church was originally a chapel of ease belonging to the proto-parish of Kranj, but was separated as a vicariate before 1502 and then elevated to a parish in 1650. The parish cemetery lies behind the church.
