= Naklo, Naklo =

Naklo
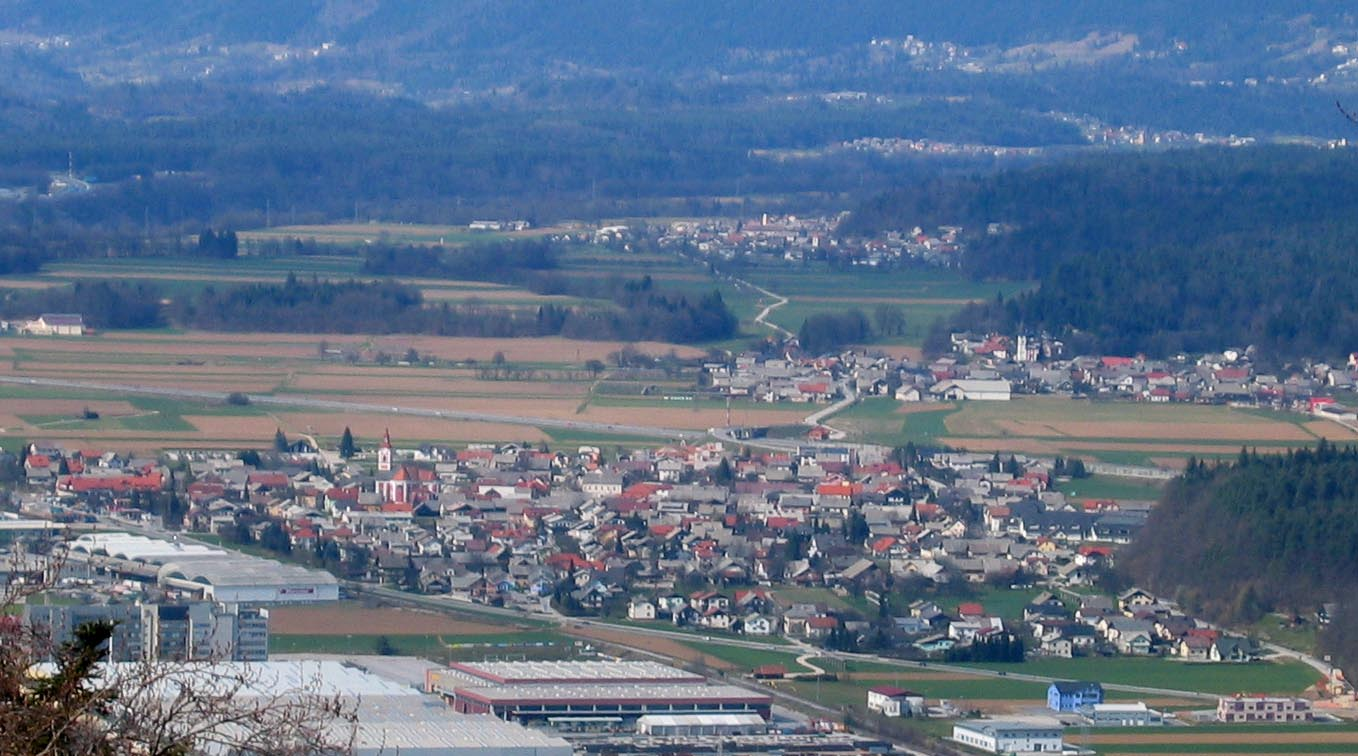

- Flag Coat of arms

- Location in Slovenia
- Coordinates: 46°16′29.69″N 14°19′3.45″E
- Country: Slovenia
- Traditional region: Upper Carniola
- Statistical region: Upper Carniola
- Municipality: Naklo

Area
  - Total: 3.9 km^{2} (1.5 sq mi)
- Elevation: 407 m (1,335 ft)

Population (2012)
  - Total: 1,717
- Postal code: 4202 Naklo

Naklo (pronounced [ˈnaːklɔ]; German: Naklas) is the largest town and the seat of the Municipality of Naklo in Slovenia. In addition to the main settlement, formerly known as Veliko Naklo (German: Großnaklas), it includes the hamlets of Malo Naklo (German: Kleinnaklas), Pivka (German: Piuka), and Podreber.

== Name ==
Naklo was first mentioned in written sources in 1241 as Nacel (and as Nakel in 1252, Nachil in 1317, Nakal in 1320, Nackel in 1323, and Nakel in 1328). The name Naklo appears elsewhere in Slovenia and in other Slavic countries—for example, Nakło (Poland) and Náklo (Czech Republic). The name is derived from *nakъlo, a fused form that has lost inflection from the prepositional phrase *na kъlě 'on a (sandy) spit in a river', thus referring to the location of the settlement. The town was known as Naklas in German in the past.

== History ==
Naklo was plundered by Ottoman forces in 1475. In June 1809 the town was plundered by French troops. Banditry was a long-term problem in the area, and local bandits took shelter in the nearby Udin Woods (Slovene: Udin boršt). Naklo had one of the first running water systems installed in Slovenia, in the 18th century, due to the efforts of Jurij Voglar (1651–1717), who willed his property in order to achieve this goal. During the Second World War, German forces surrounded Naklo with a network of bunkers and wire barriers, and they established a headquarters for an SS regiment in the town.

== Church ==
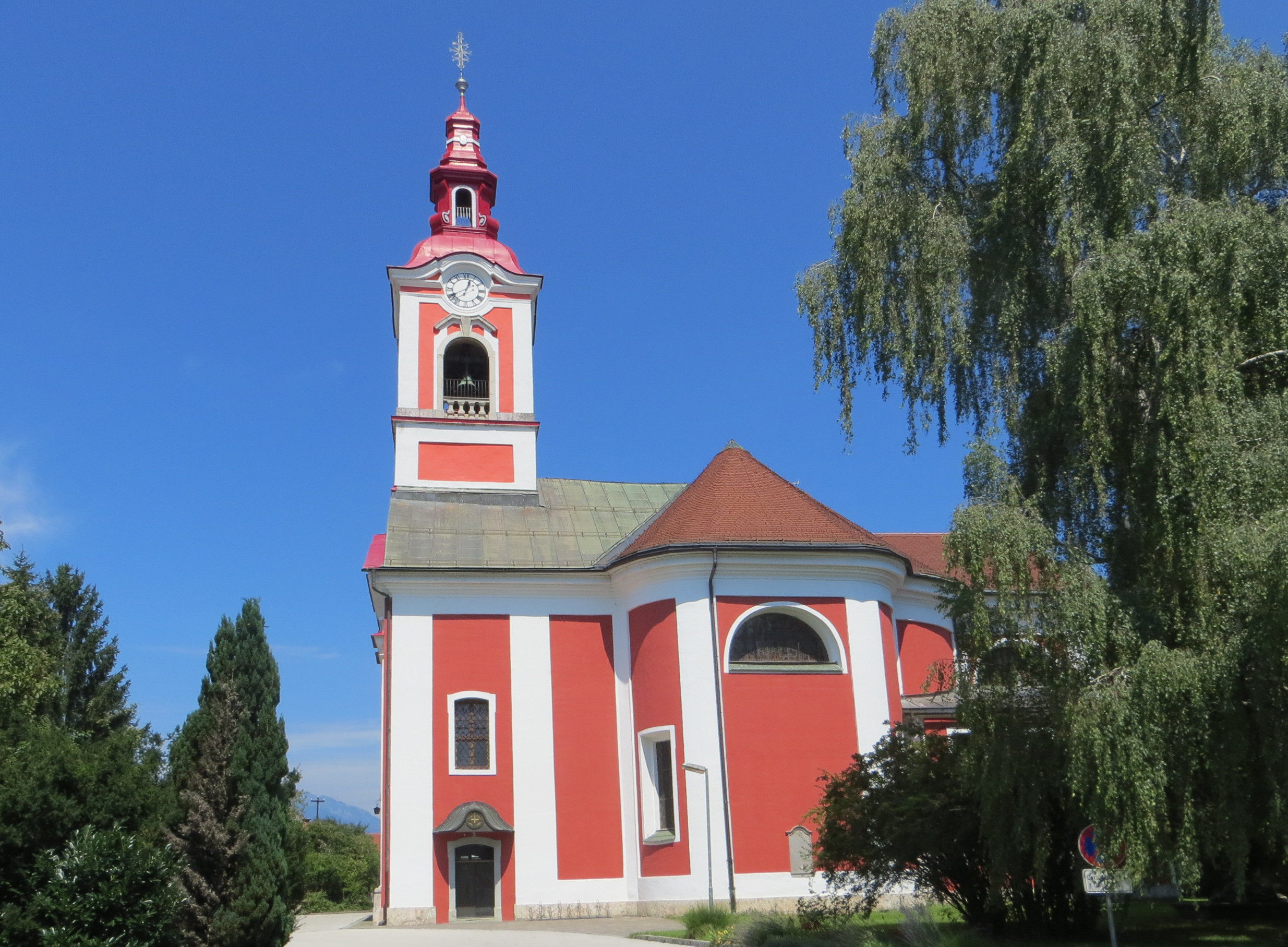
View from south

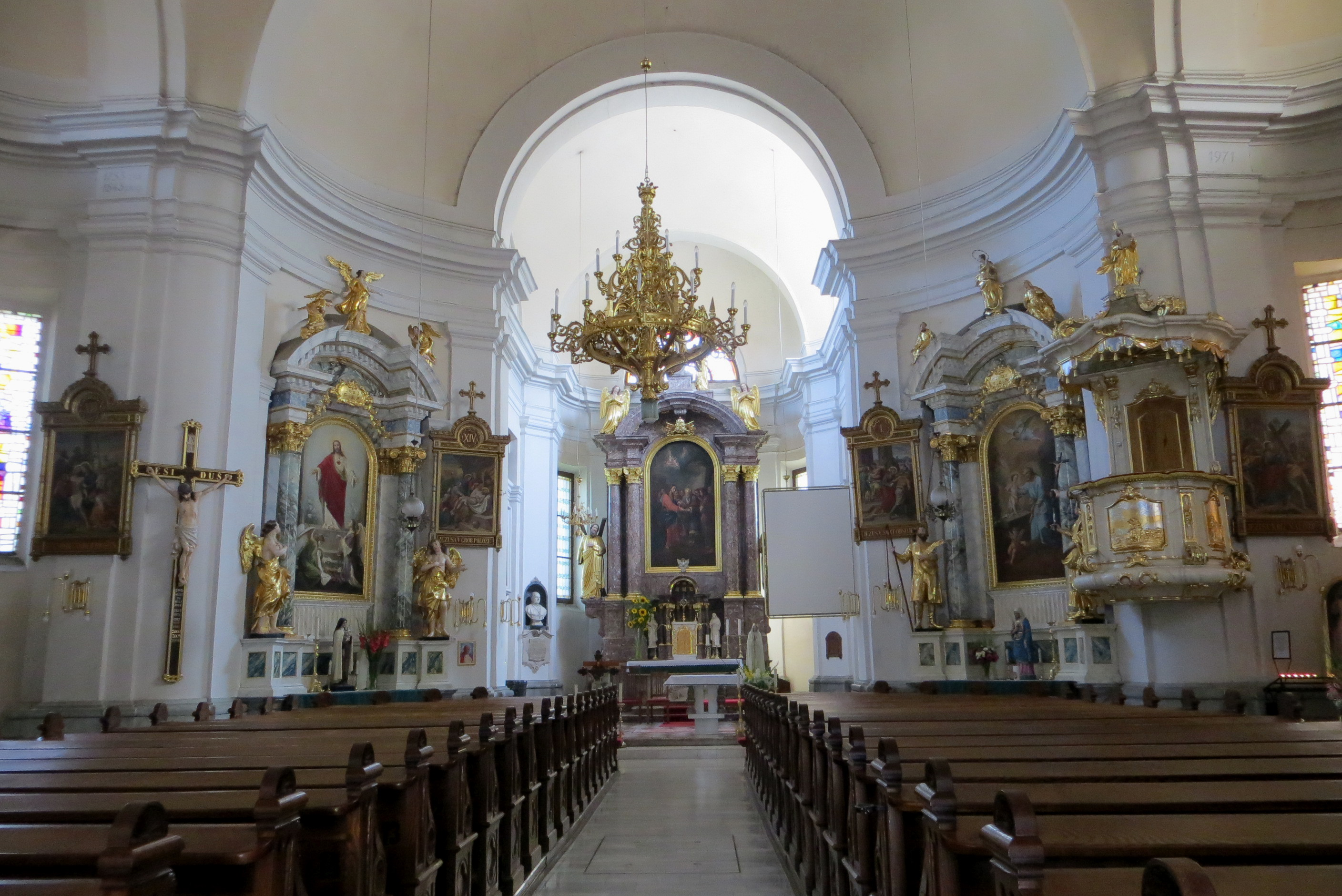
Interior

Saint Peter's Church

The local church is dedicated to Saint Peter. It is a Baroque structure and was renovated after a fire in 1843. The altar painting is by Leopold Layer (1752–1828), and the Stations of the Cross were painted by Janez Wolf (1825–1884).

== Notable people ==
Notable people that were born or lived in Naklo include:

- Leopold Ješe (1886–1958), physician
- Tomo Križnar (born 1954) writer and peace activist
- Jernej Legat (1807–1875), bishop of Trieste
- Jernej Pavlin (1881–1963), stenographer
- Jože Pavlin (1875–1914), sculptor
- Jurij Voglar (a.k.a. Carbonarius) (1651–1717), physician and diplomat
- Franz Wrenk (1766–1830), engraver
