= Polica, Naklo =

Polica
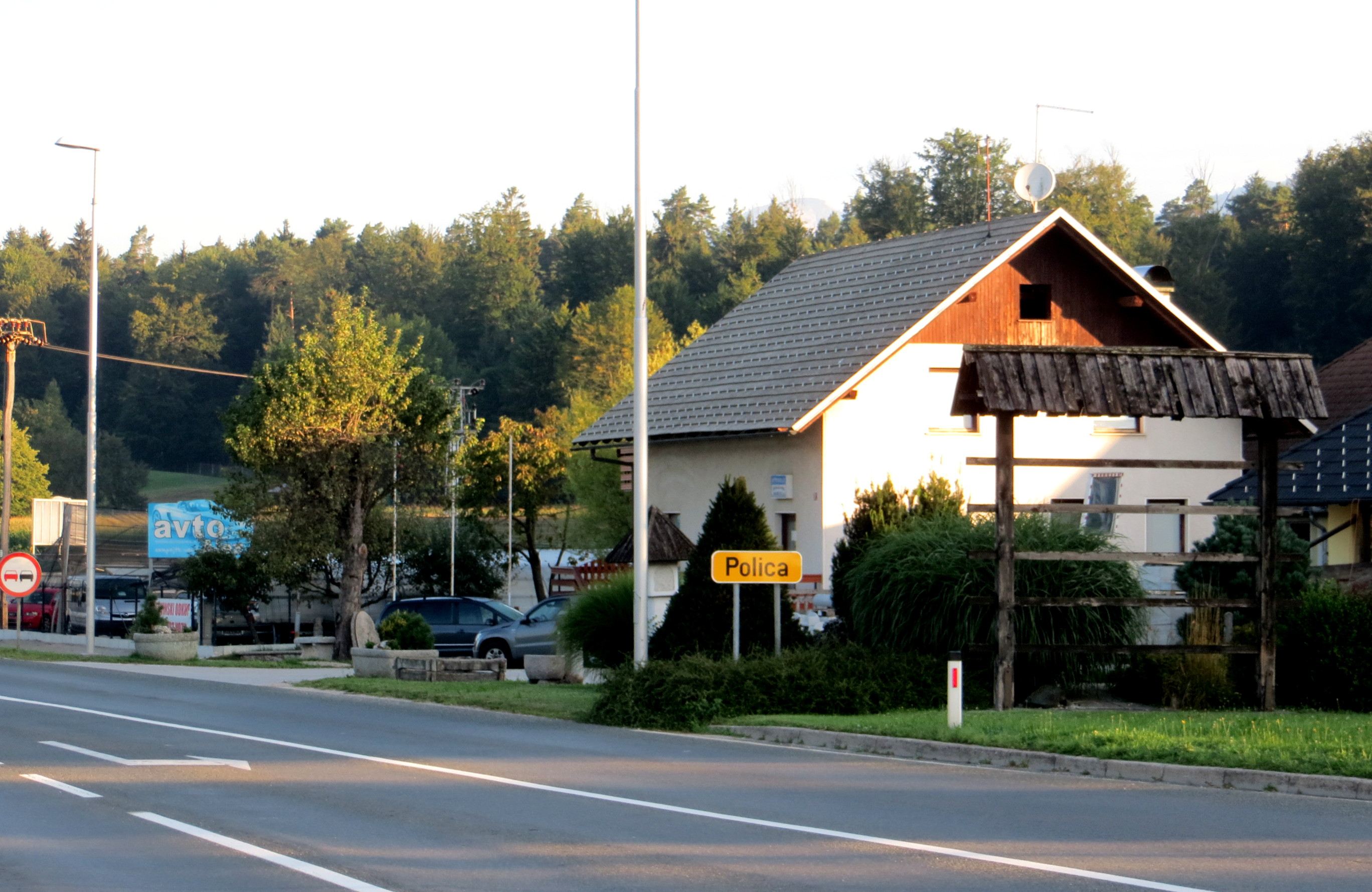

- Location in Slovenia
- Coordinates: 46°15′54.28″N 14°19′39.9″E
- Country: Slovenia
- Traditional region: Upper Carniola
- Statistical region: Upper Carniola
- Municipality: Naklo
- Elevation: 404.4 m (1,327 ft)

Population (2002)
  - Total: 84

Polica (pronounced [pɔˈliːtsa]) is a settlement in the Municipality of Naklo in the Upper Carniola region of Slovenia.

== Name ==
The name Polica is derived from the Slovene common noun polica 'terraced earth between two embankments', thus referring to the local geography. The flat terrain of the village rises sharply on the northeast side of the settlement, toward the Udin Woods, and it drops sharply to the southwest, toward the Dobrava Forest above the Sava River.
