= Zgornje Duplje =

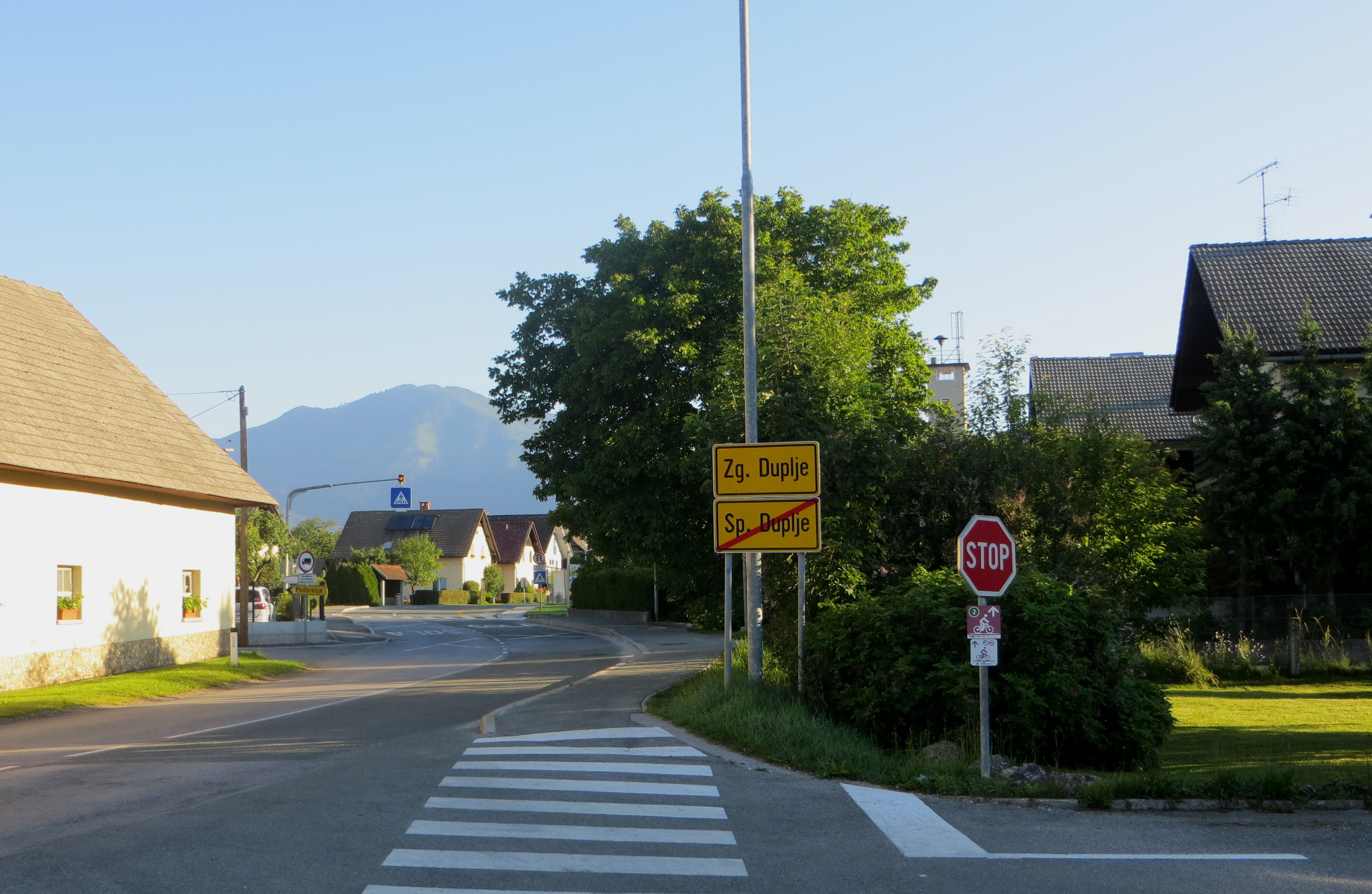

- Location in Slovenia
- Coordinates: 46°18′31.61″N 14°17′38.33″E
- Country: Slovenia
- Traditional region: Upper Carniola
- Statistical region: Upper Carniola
- Municipality: Naklo
- Elevation: 461 m (1,512 ft)

Population (2002)
  - Total: 489

Zgornje Duplje (pronounced [ˈzɡoːɾnjɛ duˈpljɛ] or [ˈzɡoːɾnjɛ ˈduːpljɛ]; German: Oberduplach) is a village in the Municipality of Naklo in the Upper Carniola region of Slovenia.

== Church ==
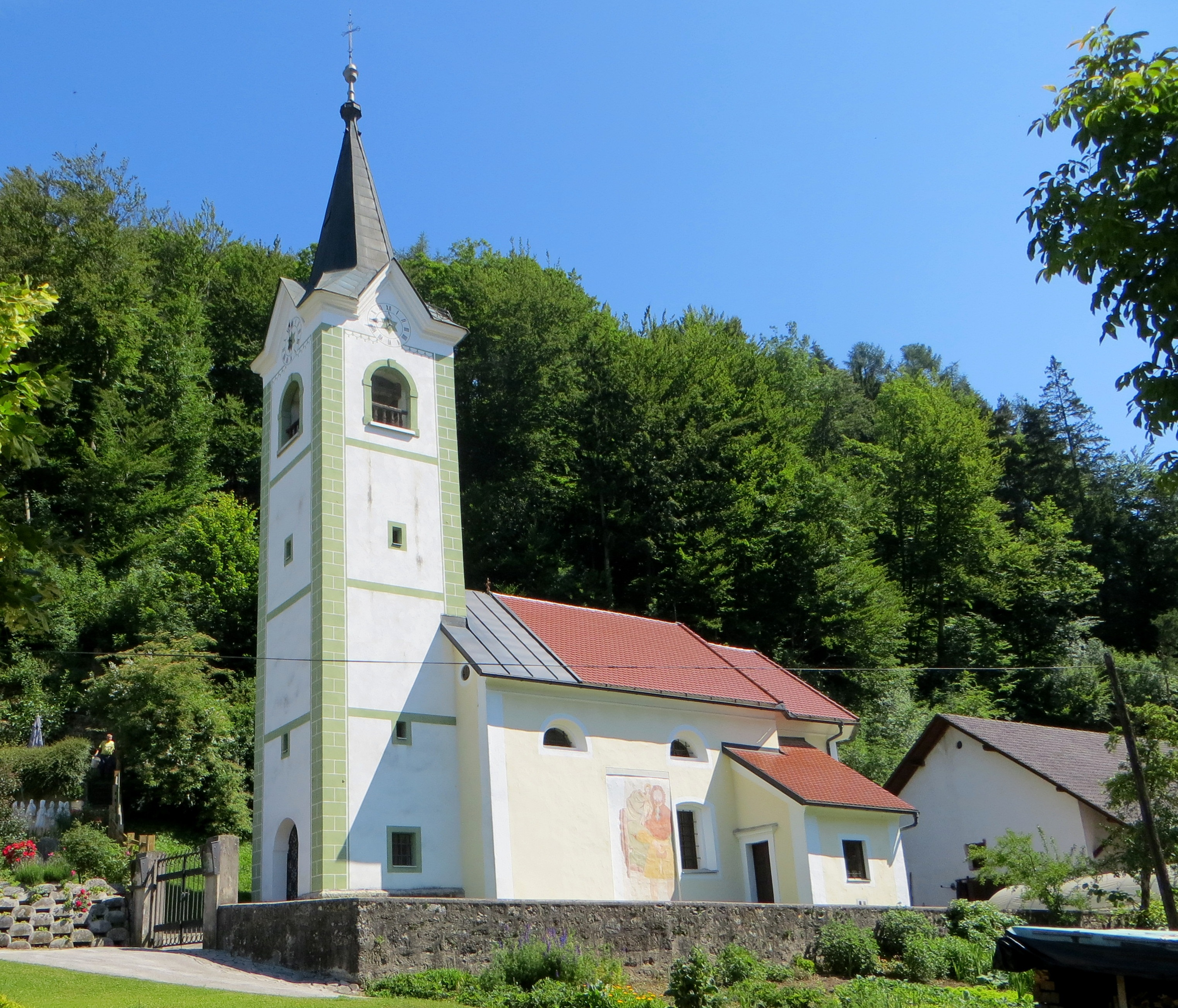
Archangel Michael Church

The local church is dedicated to Archangel Michael.
