= Okroglo, Naklo =

Okroglo
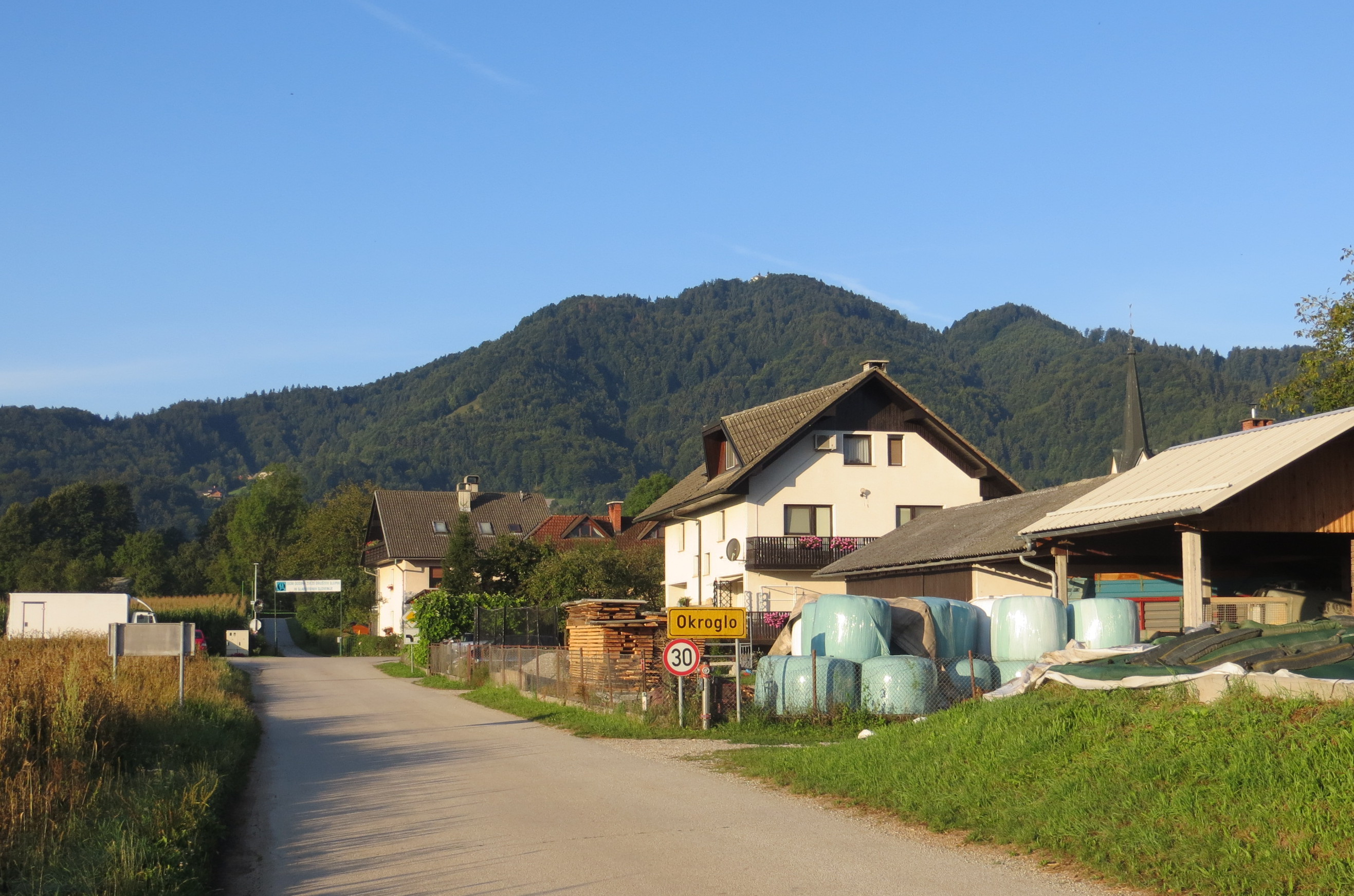

- Location in Slovenia
- Coordinates: 46°15′27.6″N 14°19′20.15″E
- Country: Slovenia
- Traditional region: Upper Carniola
- Statistical region: Upper Carniola
- Municipality: Naklo
- Elevation: 407.2 m (1,336 ft)

Population (2002)
  - Total: 153

Okroglo (pronounced [ɔˈkɾoːɡlɔ]) is a settlement in the Municipality of Naklo in the Upper Carniola region of Slovenia.

== Church ==
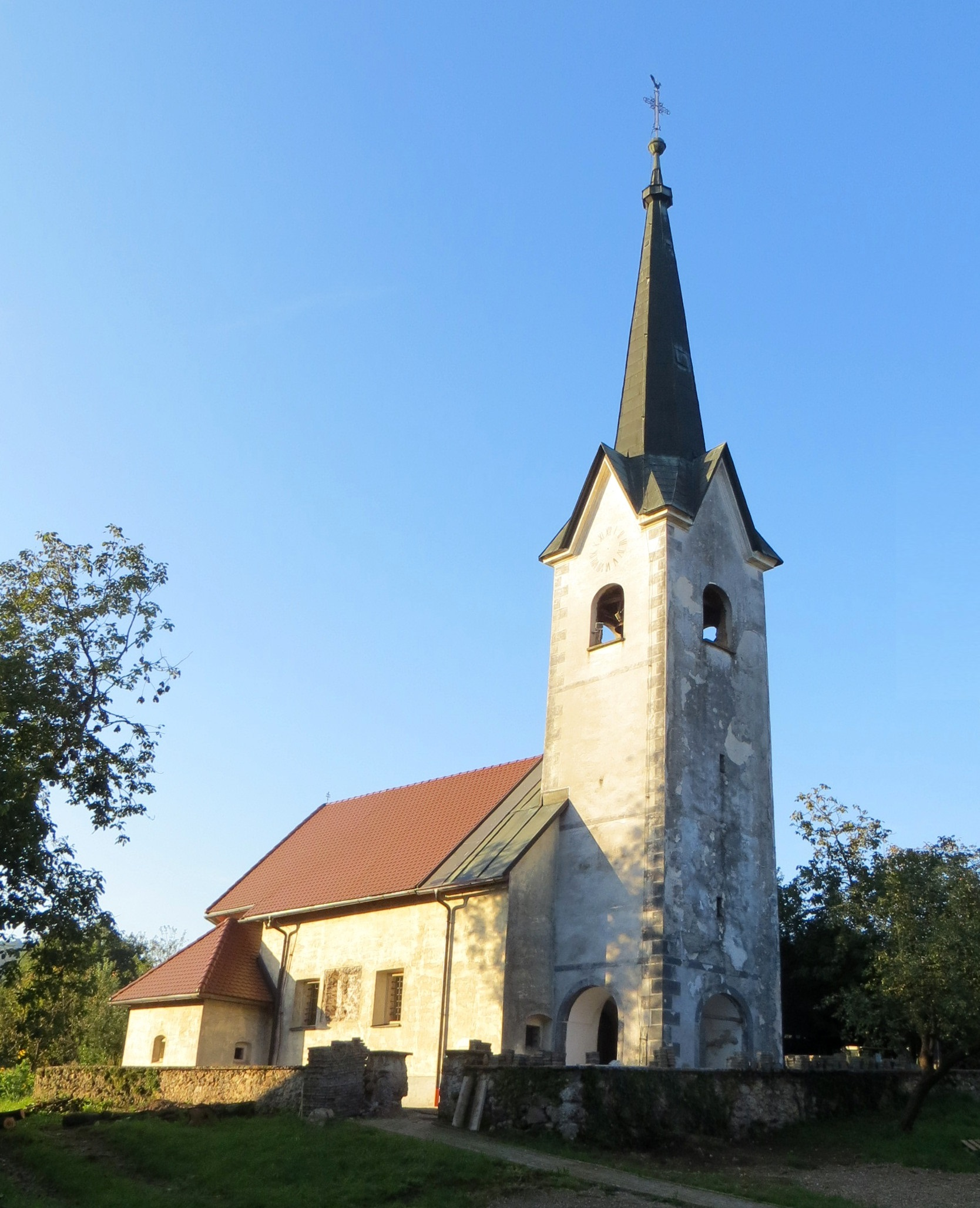
Mary Magdalene Church

The local church is dedicated to Mary Magdalene.
