= Strahinj =

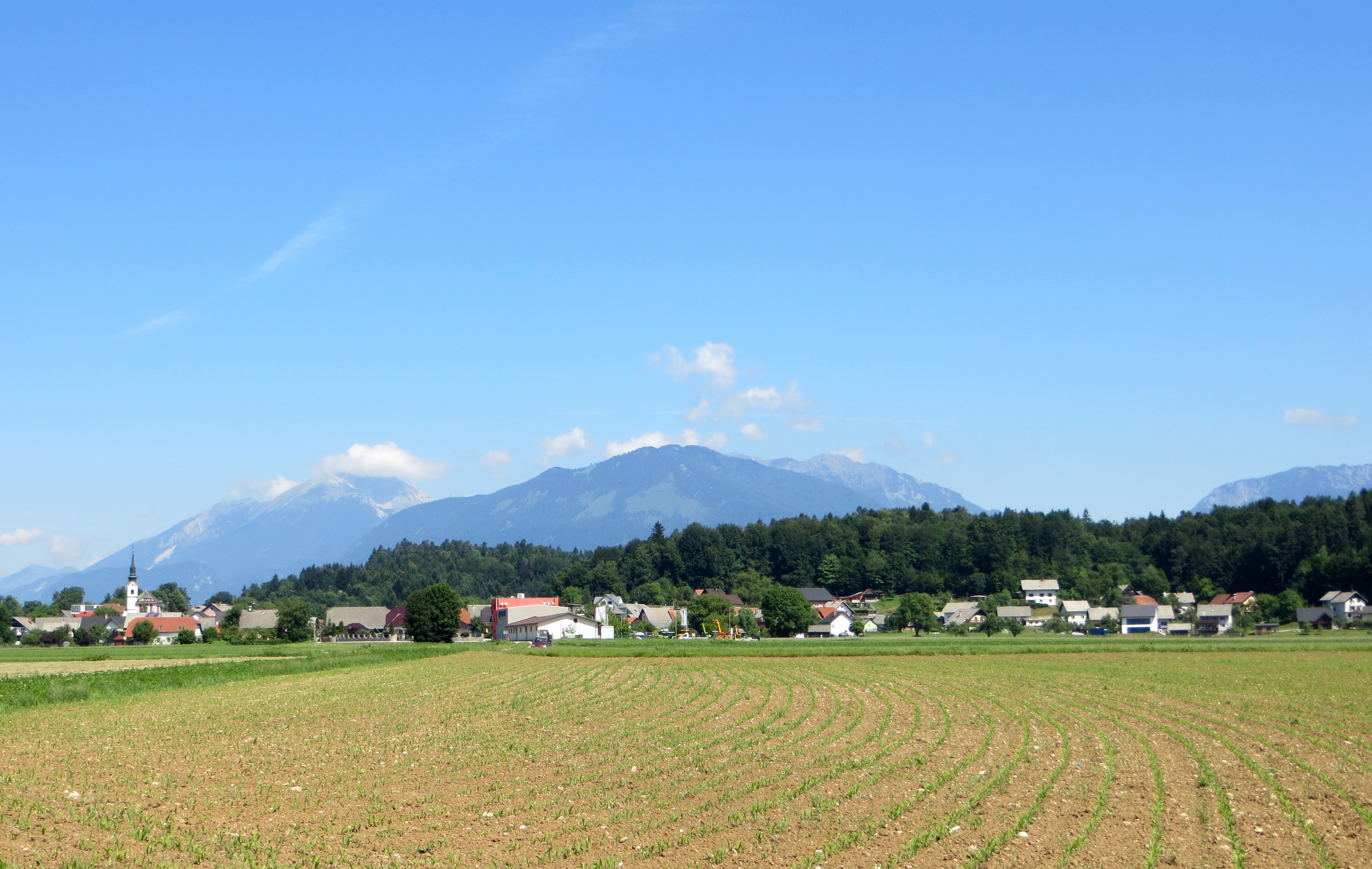

- Location in Slovenia
- Coordinates: 46°17′2.29″N 14°18′43.94″E
- Country: Slovenia
- Traditional region: Upper Carniola
- Statistical region: Upper Carniola
- Municipality: Naklo
- Elevation: 422.6 m (1,386 ft)

Population (2002)
  - Total: 694

Strahinj (pronounced [stɾaˈxiːn]; in older sources also Strohinj, German: Strochain) is a village in the Municipality of Naklo in the Upper Carniola region of Slovenia.

== Church ==
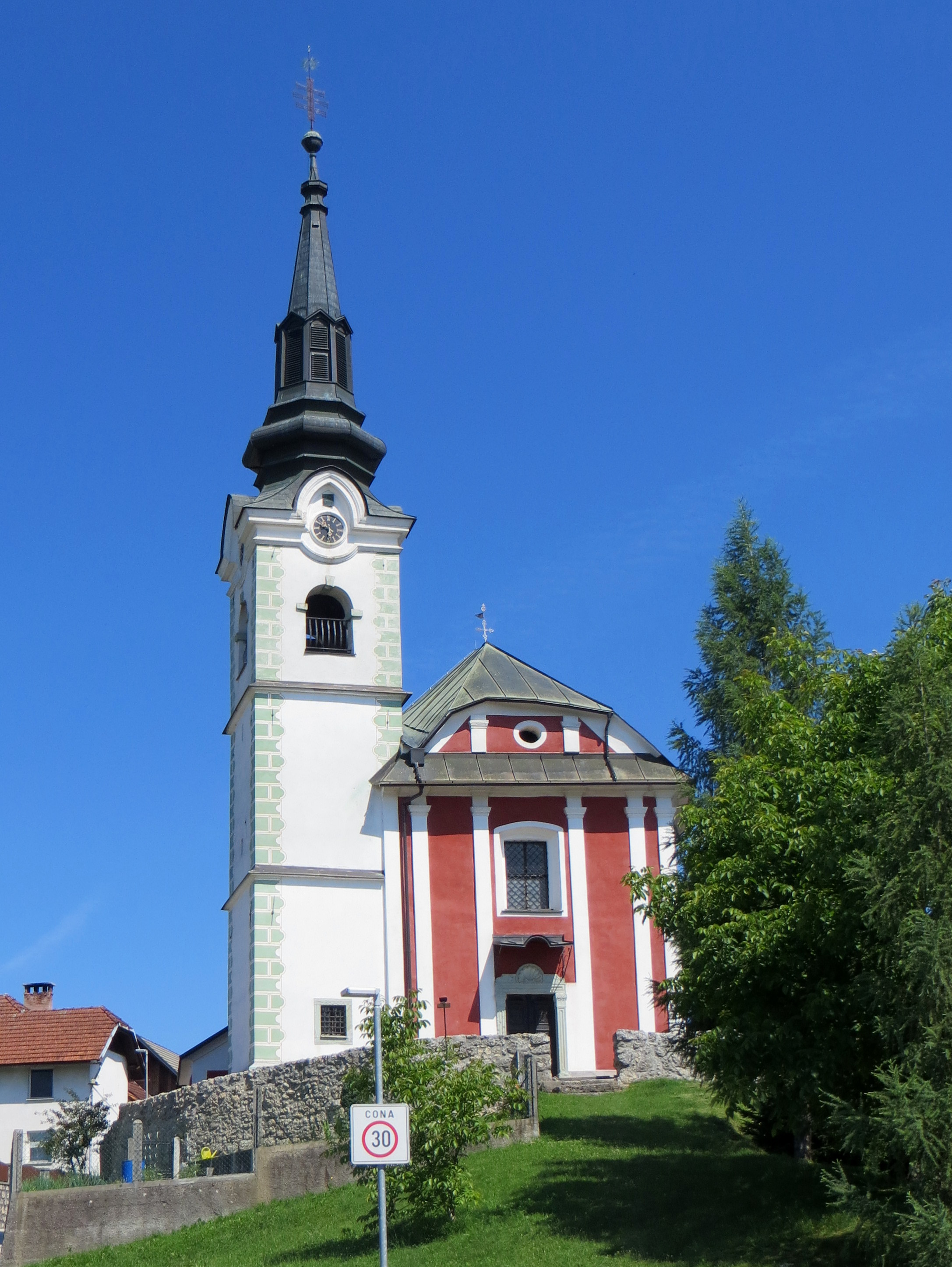
Saint Nicholas's Church

The local church is dedicated to Saint Nicholas.
