= Spodnje Duplje =

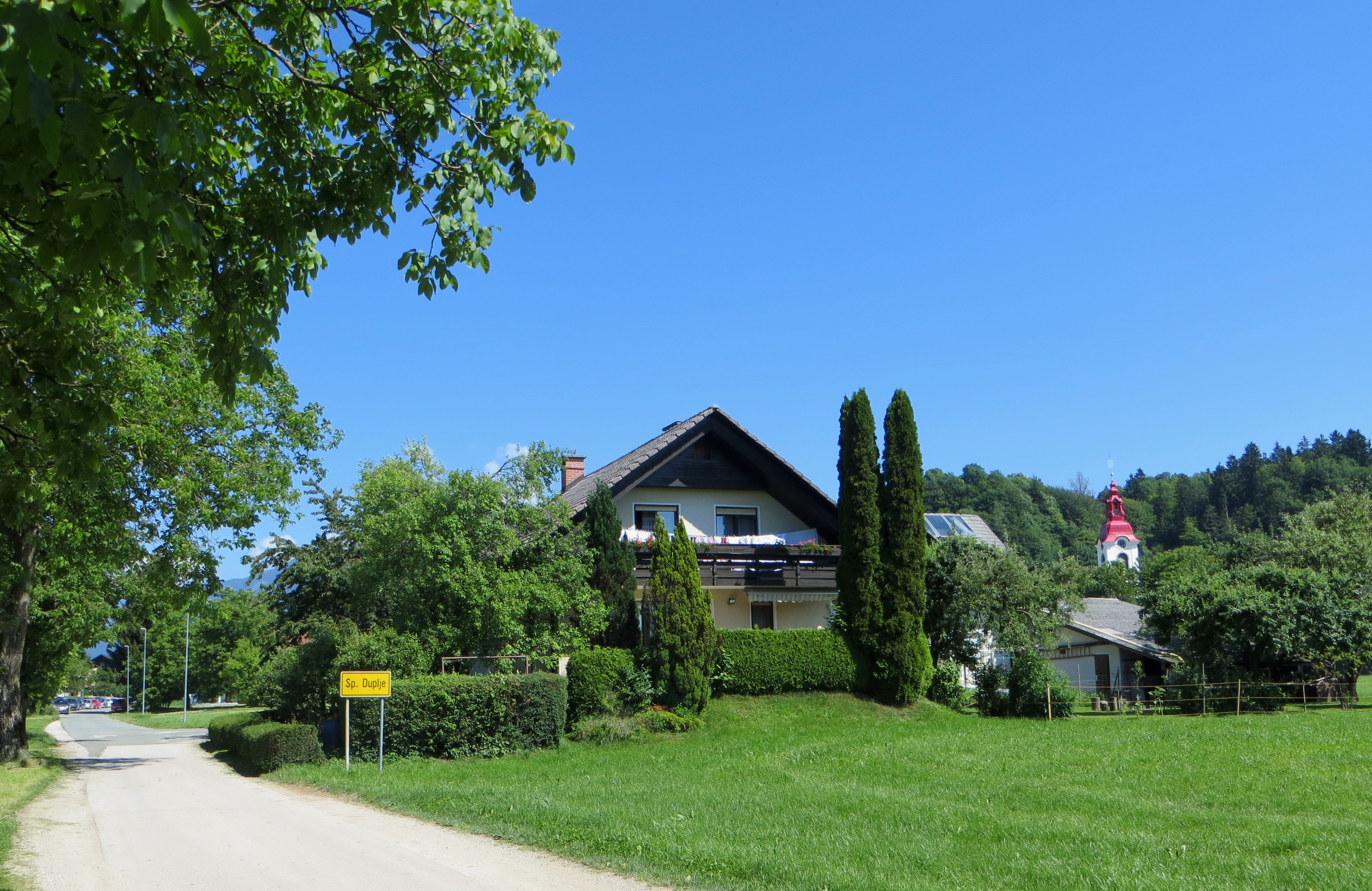

- Location in Slovenia
- Coordinates: 46°17′58.43″N 14°18′6.79″E
- Country: Slovenia
- Traditional region: Upper Carniola
- Statistical region: Upper Carniola
- Municipality: Naklo
- Elevation: 444 m (1,457 ft)

Population (2002)
  - Total: 694

Spodnje Duplje (pronounced [ˈspoːdnjɛ duˈpljɛ] or [ˈspoːdnjɛ ˈduːpljɛ]; German: Unterduplach) is a settlement in the Municipality of Naklo in the Upper Carniola region of Slovenia.

== Name ==
Spodnje Duplje was attested in historical sources as Burla in 1209, Duplach between 1205 and 1208, niderm Devplach in 1348, and Tewͦpplach in 1348, among other spellings.

== Church ==
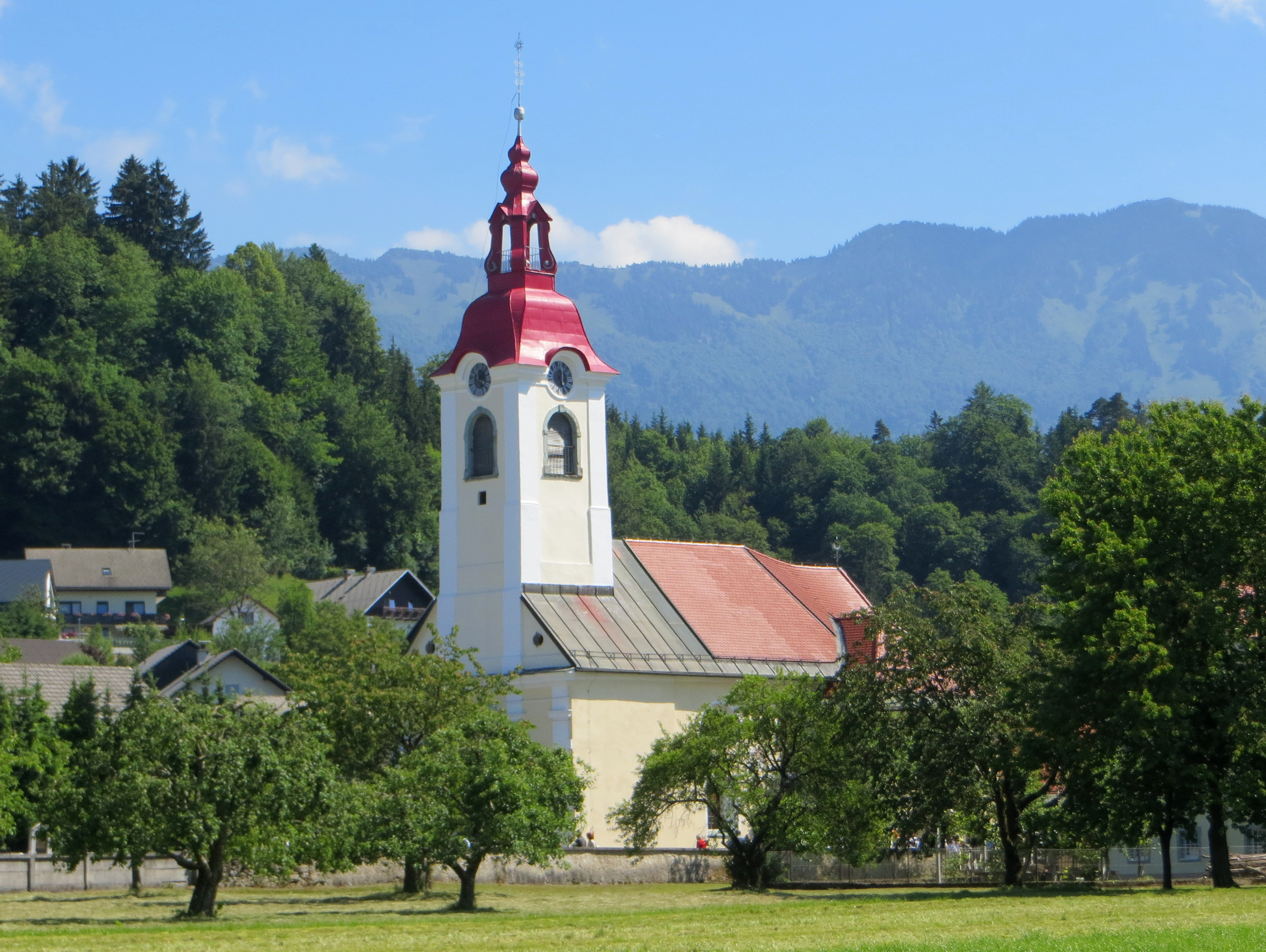
Saint Vitus's Church

The local church is dedicated to Saint Vitus.
