= Zadraga =

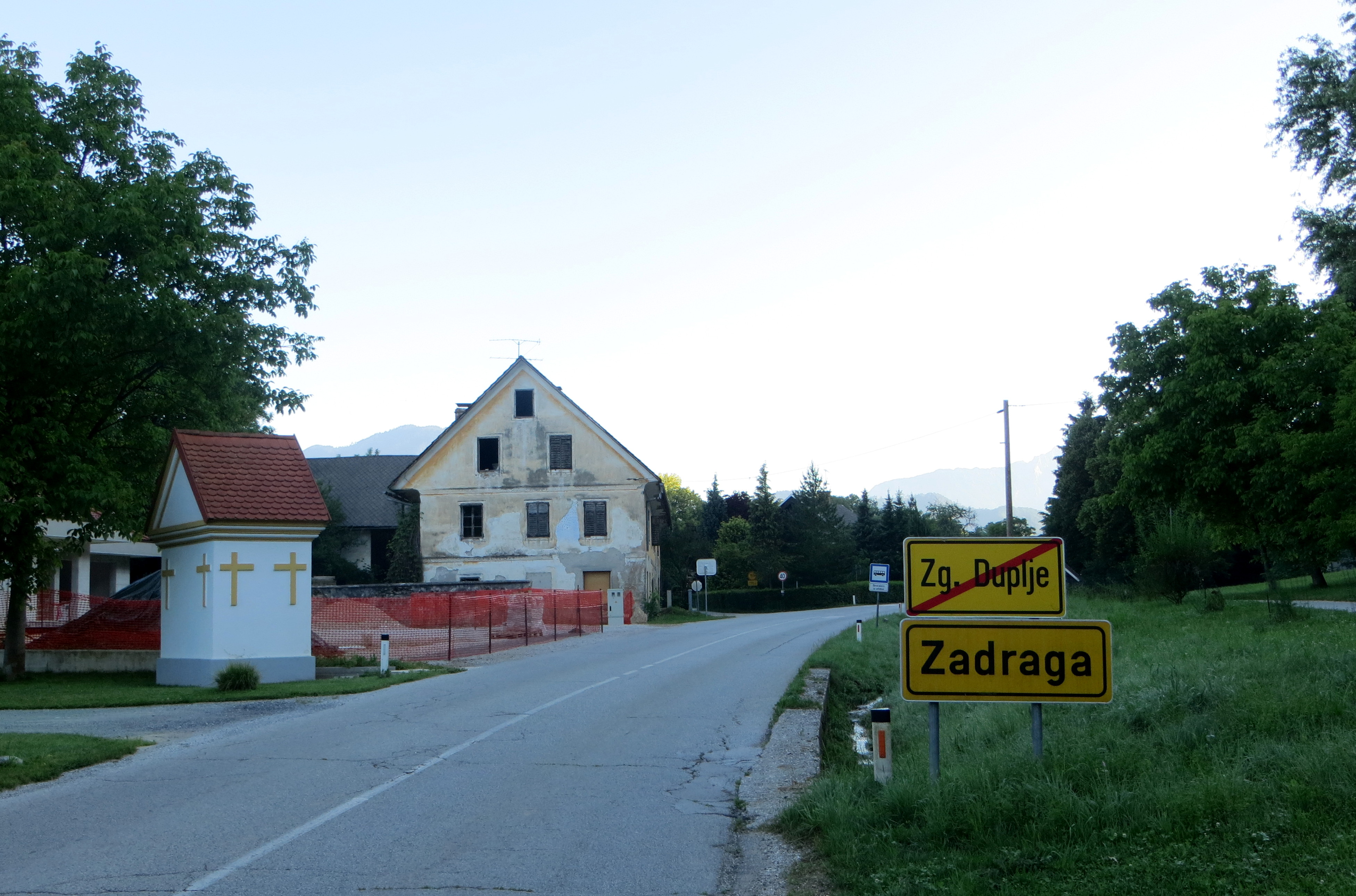

- Location in Slovenia
- Coordinates: 46°18′49.68″N 14°17′25.94″E
- Country: Slovenia
- Traditional region: Upper Carniola
- Statistical region: Upper Carniola
- Municipality: Naklo
- Elevation: 468.9 m (1,538 ft)

Population (2002)
  - Total: 91

Zadraga (pronounced [zaˈdɾaːɡa]) is a village in the Municipality of Naklo in the Upper Carniola region of Slovenia.
