= The Palace at Nakło =

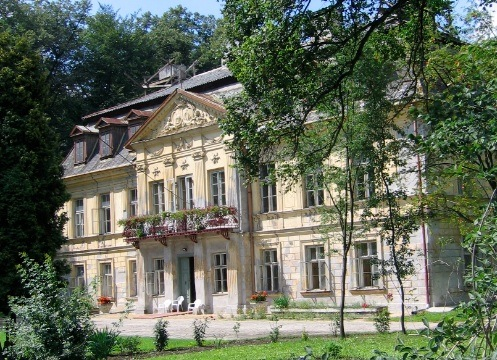
The Palace at Nakło

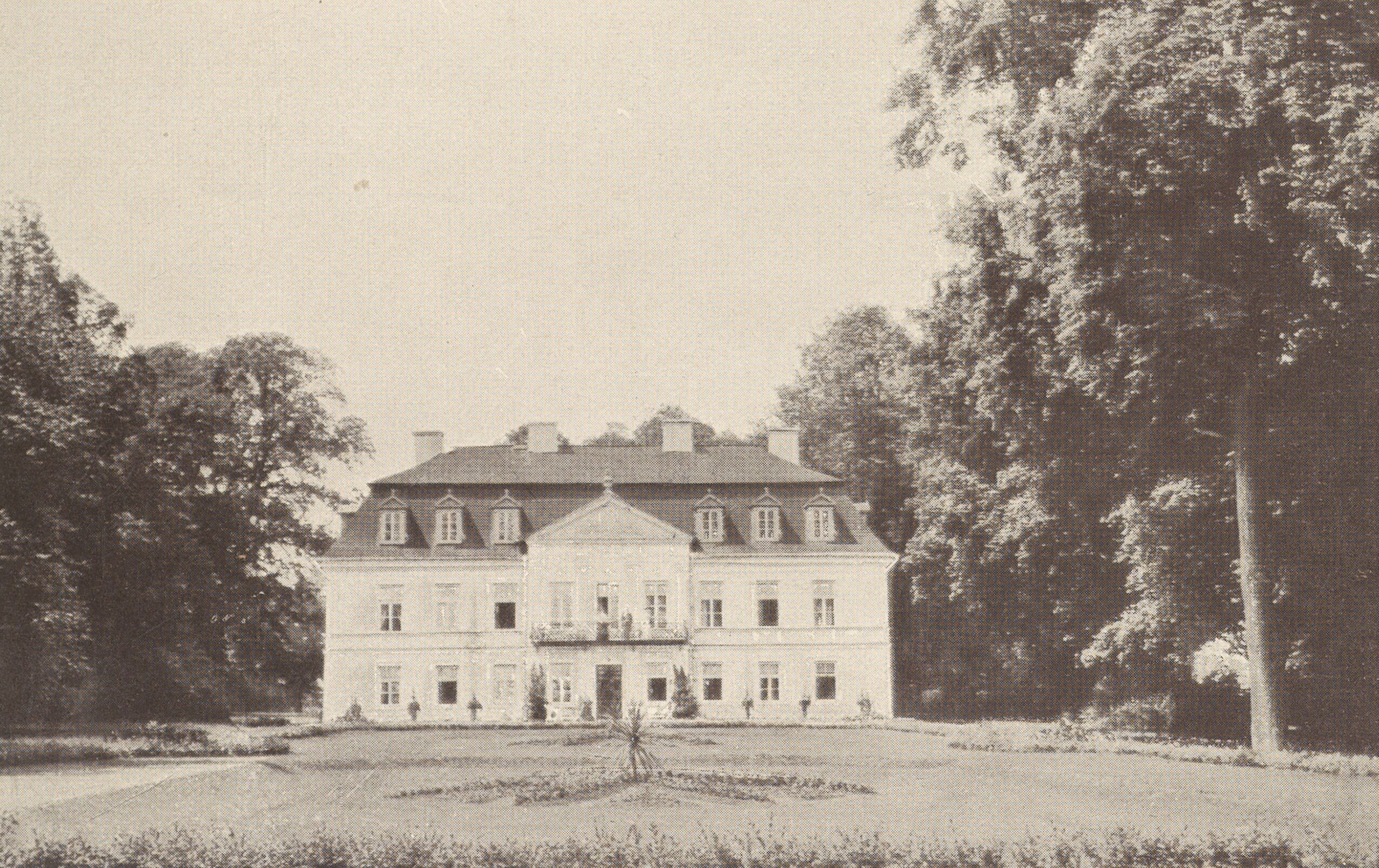
The Palace before 1911

The Palace at Nakło, located in the village of Nakło, administrative district of Lelów; Częstochowa County, province of Silesia, is an example of neoclassical architecture. It was designed by the architect Jan Ferdynand Nax (1736–1810). It is a downsized and simplified reflection of the much larger and grander neoclassical palace at Szczekociny, six kilometers to the east. Nax, who was also a prominent economist of the time, constructed the two palaces simultaneously between 1770 and 1780.

The 8.5-hectare (21 acre) park surrounding the Nakło palace, of a classic Arcadian style, most likely also was designed by Nax. Eighty of the trees in the park have stood for more than 230 years; five of those are designated as Polish national treasures.

For the Nakło palace's foundation, Nax used calcium-based stone, which is natural to the Kraków-Częstochowa Upland of Poland, and situated the building on the highest point of the property, thus creating a natural drainage system.

The palace was built as a residence for newlyweds Kajetan Bystrzonowski and Marcyanna Młodzianowska, and was the center of an estate that stretched over a vast swath of land that had been deeded to the groom as a dowry from his future wife in 1764.

The Bystrzonowski newlyweds lived in the palace for only a short time, however, as the bride died four years after the couple passed over the threshold on their wedding day.

After Marcyanna Mlodzianowska-Bystrzonowska's death, ownership is recorded as changing in 1804 when Baron Józef Bysztronowski (relation to Kajetan unknown) assumed the deed to the estate. Whatever their relationship, both Jozef and Kajetan Bystrzonowski obtained the hereditary title of Count of Galicia from Prussian Emperor Franz II in 1801.

The palace, a caretaker's building, a stable, the main entry gate and the park are all privately owned, but are maintained by The Nakło Foundation and protected under Poland's Ministry of Culture and National Heritage.
