= Gobovce =

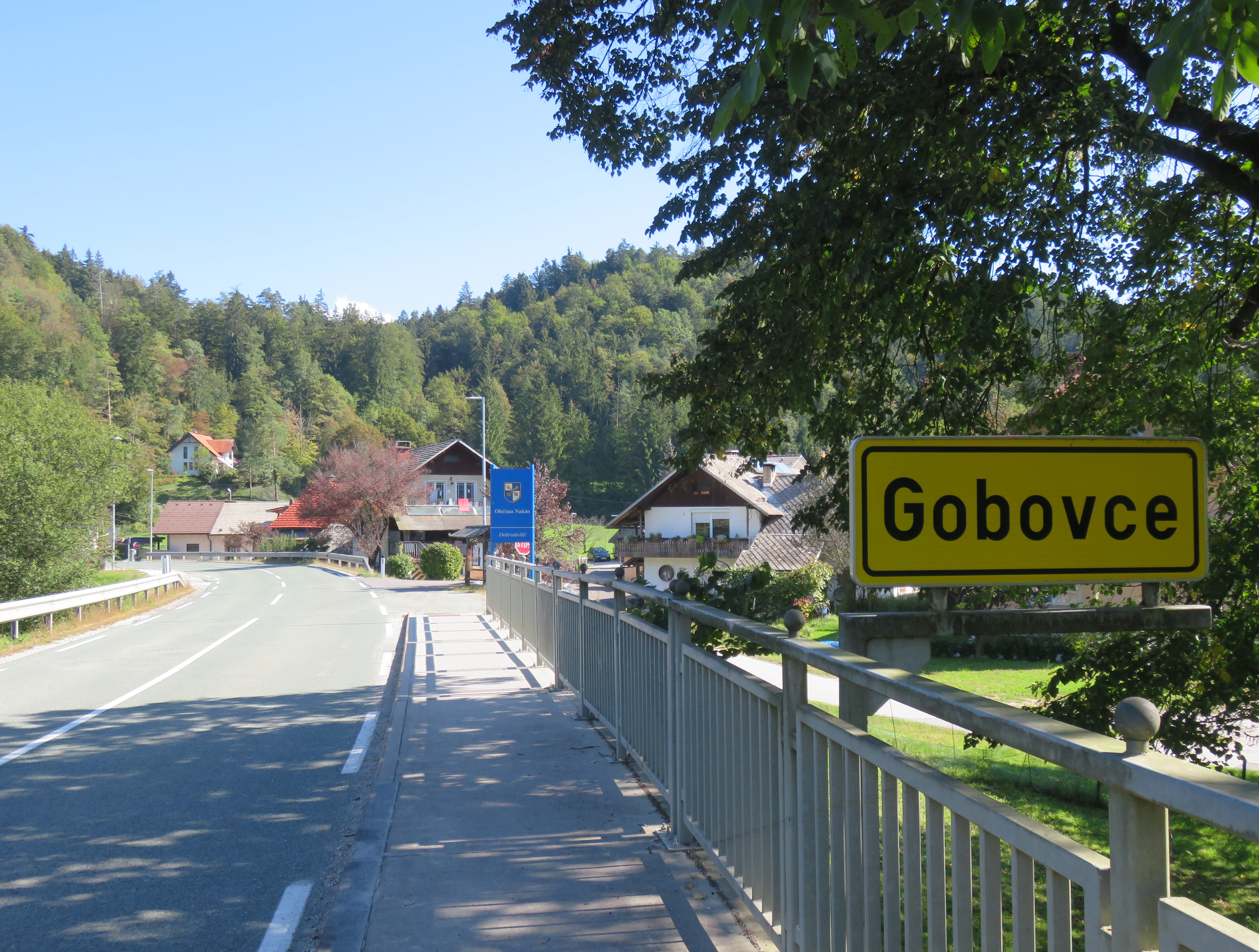

- Location in Slovenia
- Coordinates: 46°17′46.40″N 14°15′15.75″E
- Country: Slovenia
- Traditional region: Upper Carniola
- Statistical region: Upper Carniola
- Municipality: Naklo
- Elevation: 374 m (1,227 ft)

Population (2002)
  - Total: 50

Gobovce (pronounced [ˈɡoːbɔu̯tsɛ]), is a settlement on the right bank of the Sava River in the Municipality of Naklo in the Upper Carniola region of Slovenia.

== Cultural heritage ==
On the slope above the village (above the regional road), there is a 480-meter (1,570 ft) cave in conglomerate rock known as Gypsy Cave (Slovene: Ciganska jama). The cave is 10 meters (33 ft) long and 2 meters (6 ft 7 in) deep. It is an archaeological site. A hoard of coins from Roman times, the majority from the 4th century AD, was found in the cave in 1895.

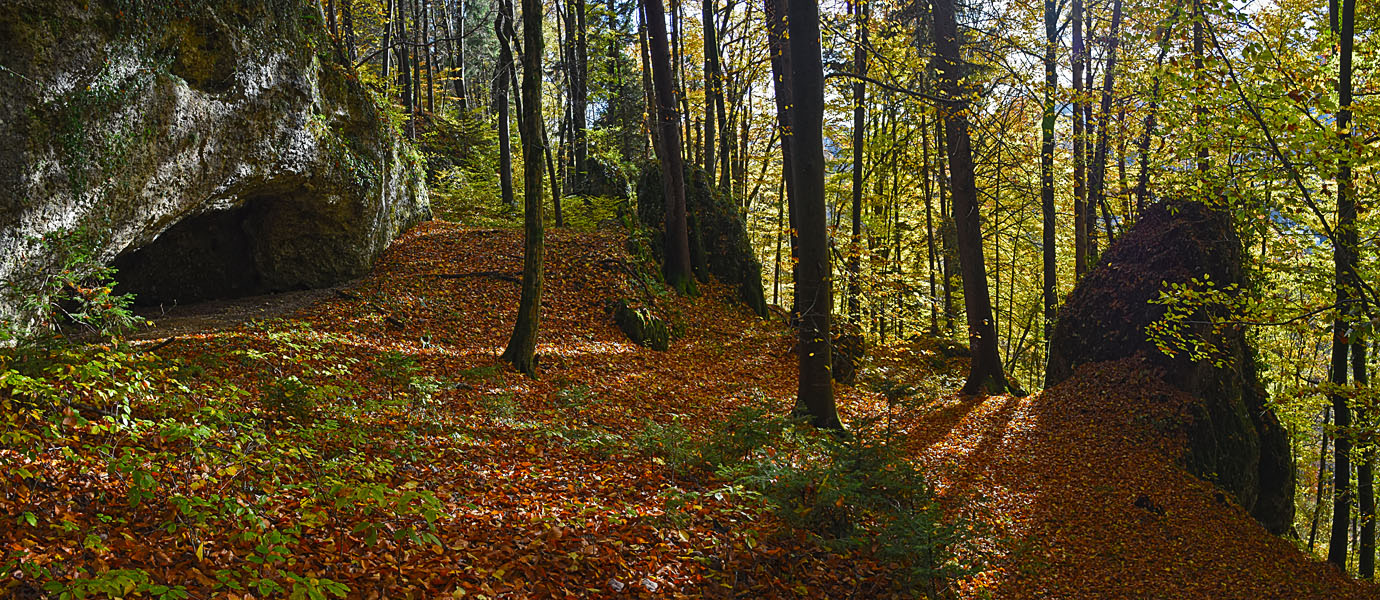
Before the cave

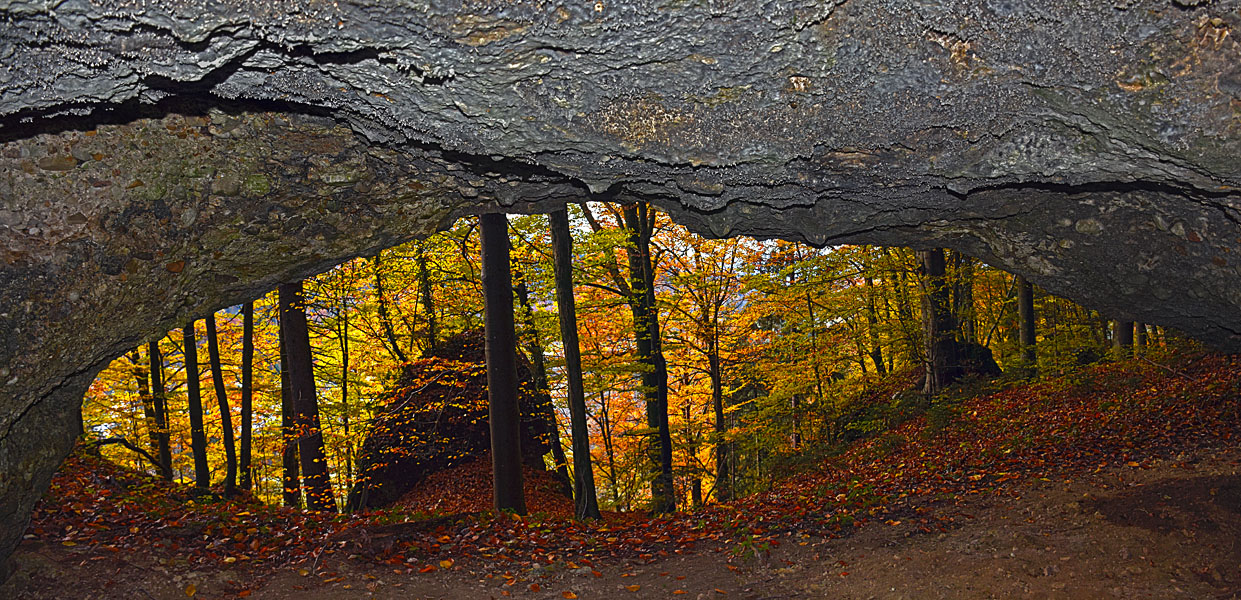
The view from the cave
