= Cegelnica =

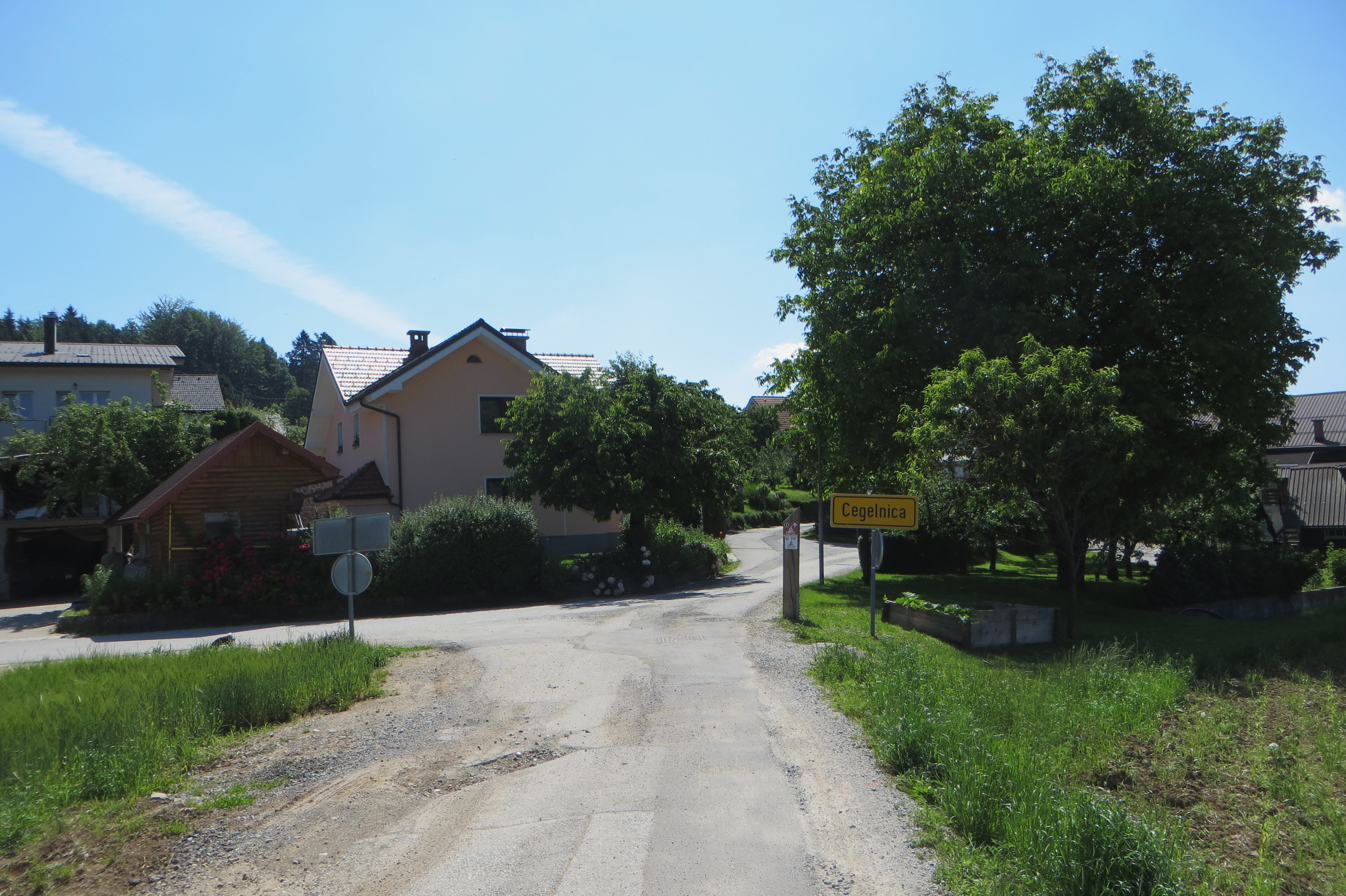

- Location in Slovenia
- Coordinates: 46°16′43.39″N 14°19′19.68″E
- Country: Slovenia
- Traditional region: Upper Carniola
- Statistical region: Upper Carniola
- Municipality: Naklo
- Elevation: 431.1 m (1,414 ft)

Population (2002)
  - Total: 305

Cegelnica (pronounced [ˈtʃeːɡəu̯nitsa]; German: Zegounza) is a settlement in the Municipality of Naklo in the Upper Carniola region of Slovenia.
