= Bistrica, Naklo =

Bistrica
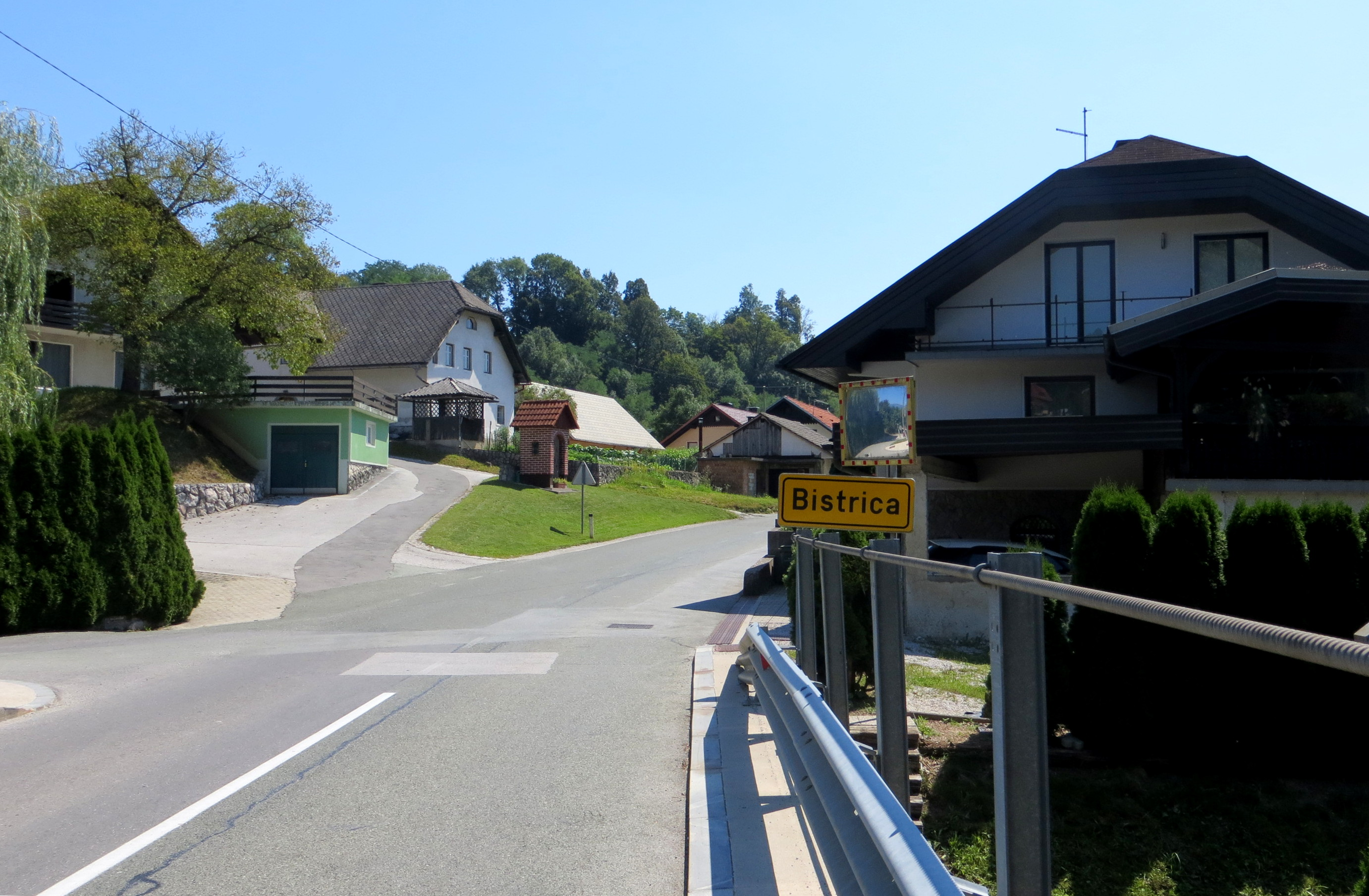

- Location in Slovenia
- Coordinates: 46°17′20.83″N 14°17′10.27″E
- Country: Slovenia
- Traditional region: Upper Carniola
- Statistical region: Upper Carniola
- Municipality: Naklo
- Elevation: 401.3 m (1,317 ft)

Population (2002)
  - Total: 82

Bistrica (pronounced [ˈbiːstɾitsa]; German: Feistritz) is a settlement in the Municipality of Naklo in the Upper Carniola region of Slovenia.

== Geography ==
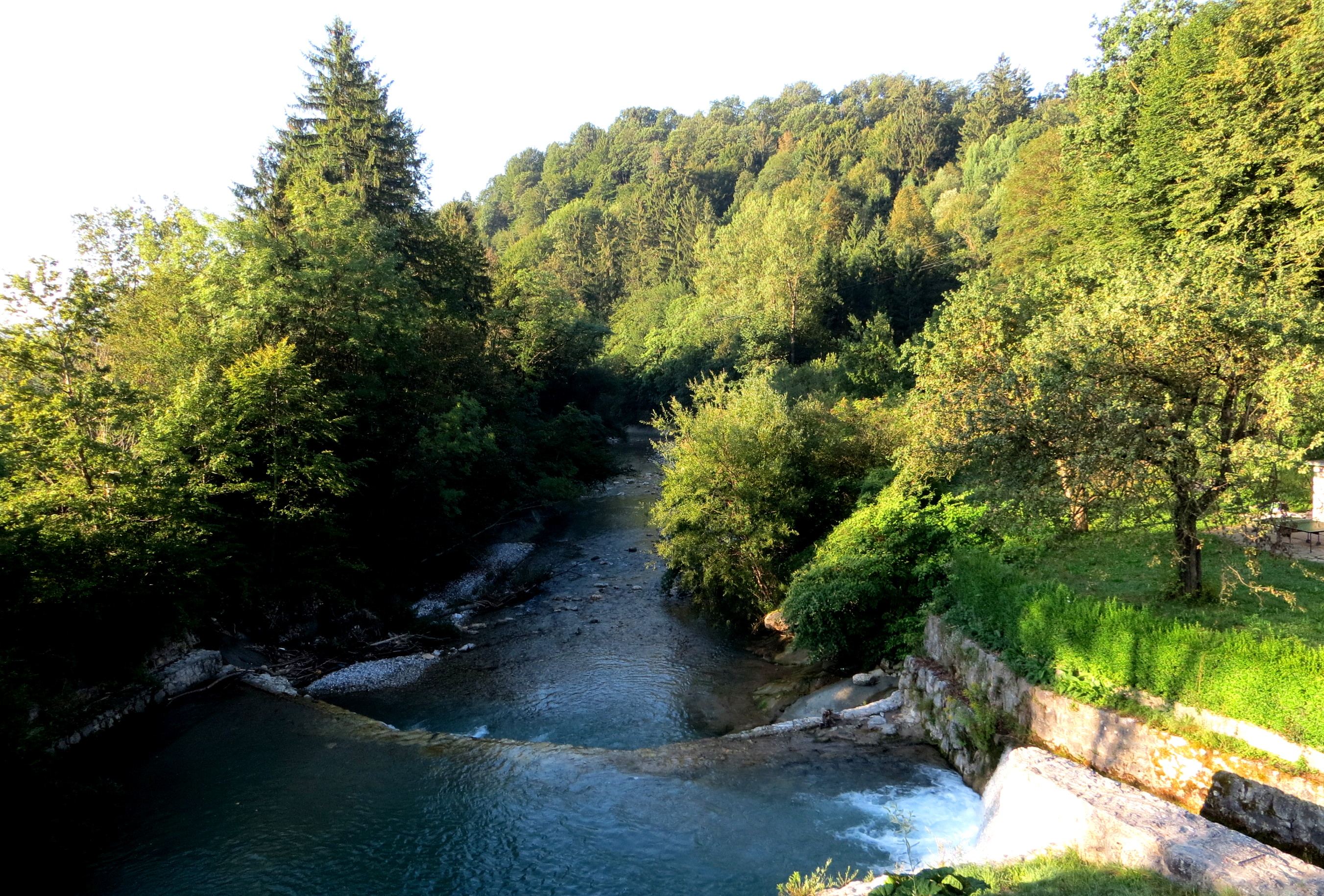
The Tržič Bistrica in Bistrica

The Tržič Bistrica River (Slovene: Tržiška Bistrica), a tributary of the Sava River, flows through the village.
