= Žeje, Naklo =

Žeje
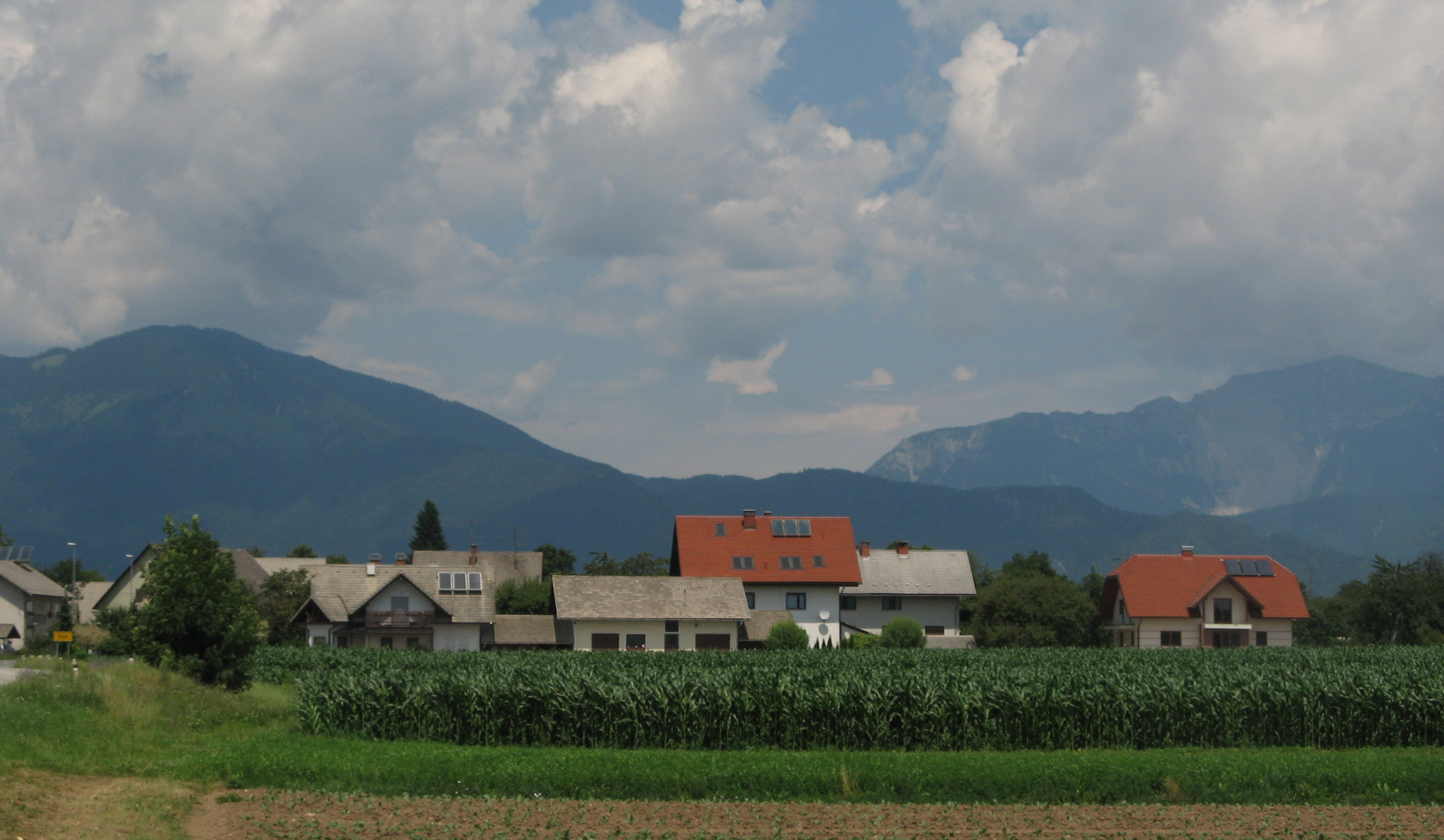

- Location in Slovenia
- Coordinates: 46°17′24.45″N 14°17′19.56″E
- Country: Slovenia
- Traditional region: Upper Carniola
- Statistical region: Upper Carniola
- Municipality: Naklo
- Elevation: 438.2 m (1,438 ft)

Population (2002)
  - Total: 84

Žeje (pronounced [ˈʒɛːjɛ] or [ˈʒeːjɛ]; German: Scheje) is a village in the Municipality of Naklo in the Upper Carniola region of Slovenia.
