= Jan Ferdynand Nax =

Jan Ferdynand Nax (April 1736 – 19 January 1810) was an architect, economist, social reformer and adviser on the navigability and conservation of Poland's water resources. While he was born in Gdańsk, and was of German origin, Nax spent most of his life in Poland and was strongly assimilated into Polish society.

As an economist, Nax based his thinking around the theory of mercantilism, which generally supported the development of a monetary-based economy instead of the system of servitude which then existed in Poland. He was a close adviser Poland's last king, Stanisław August Poniatowski, in the king's failed attempts reform which preceded the First Partition of Poland, among Russia, Prussia and Austria, in 1772. Nax supported the development of trade and production, stressed the need for reform in agriculture, and promoted enfranchisement of the peasant class. He was also an adviser on tax policy, and a supporter of protectionism in foreign trade.

Also appointed as a royal architect by King Stanislaw (1774), Nax is associated with the design and construction, or reconstruction, of a number of aristocratic homes including the Małachowski Palace in Nałęczów, The Palace at Kurozwęki, The Palace at Szczekociny, The Palace at Nakło, The Palace at Śladków, and The Palace at Rusinów, all of which represent his neoclassical approach to architectural design.

The Palace at Szczekociny is generally considered to be his most important contribution to Polish architecture of the late 18th century, and is notable for his introduction of Polish national symbols into the palace's artistic features, including the Polish eagle motif atop columns that adorn the structure.

Nax conducted studies of Poland's major waterways, including the Pilica and Warta rivers, drafted a map of the Dniester River (1781); and wrote regulations for the Bug, Narew, Nida, Pilica and Wieprz tributaries.

In 1784 Nax developed a map of Polish sources of salt.
