= Nakło, Częstochowa County =

Nakło
- Village
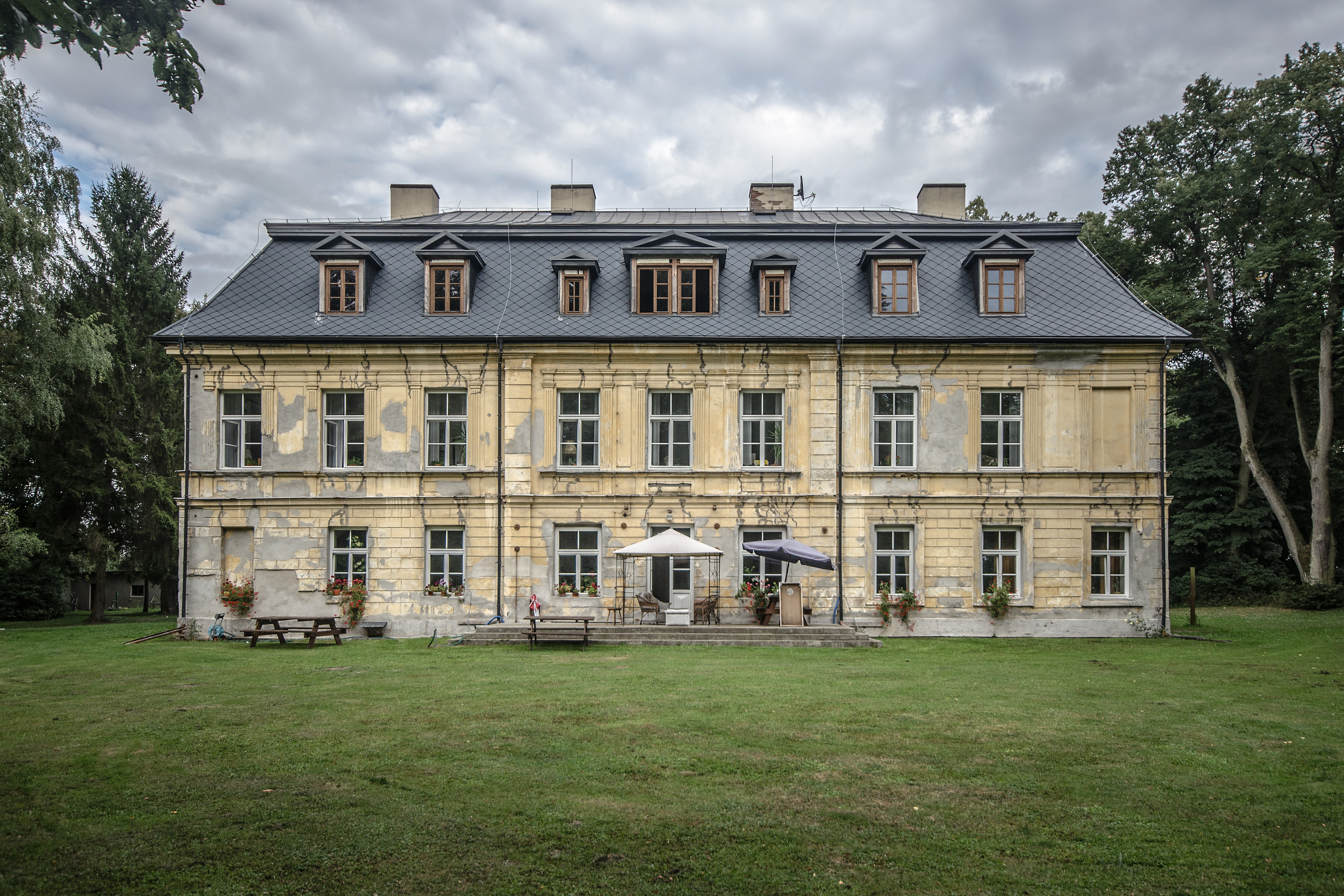
- Palace

- Location within Poland
- Coordinates: 50°39′N 19°43′E
- Country: Poland
- Voivodeship: Silesian
- County: Częstochowa
- Gmina: Lelów
- Population: 614

Nakło [ˈnakwɔ] is a village in the administrative district of Gmina Lelów, within Częstochowa County, Silesian Voivodeship, in southern Poland.

Architectural relics include a brick church built at the turn of the 17th and 18th centuries and consecrated in 1726 by Bishop Augustine Wessel, and an 18th-century neoclassical palace. The Palace at Nakło was designed by Polish economist and royal architect Jan Ferdynand Nax.
