= Malo Naklo =

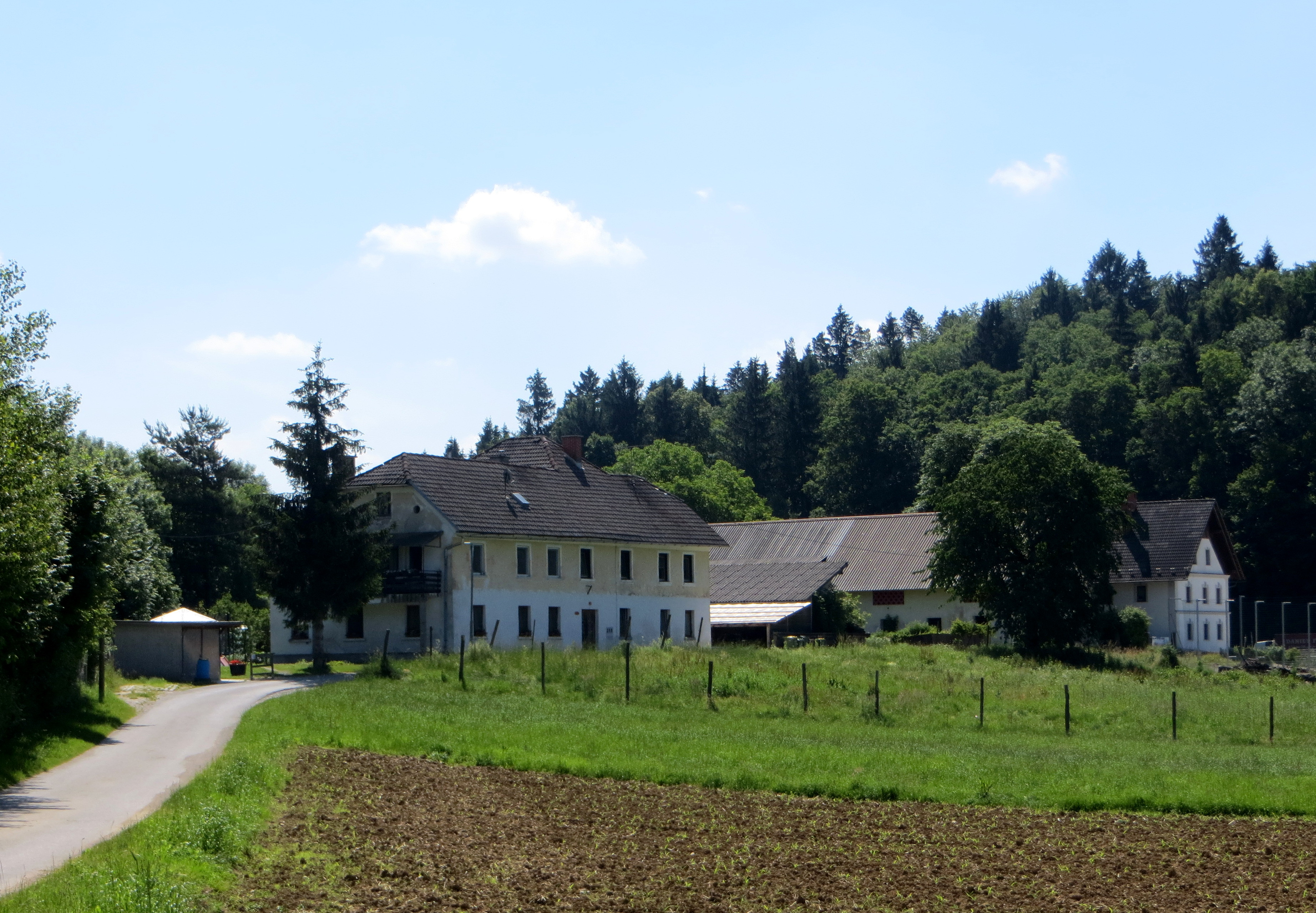

- Location in Slovenia
- Coordinates: 46°16′24.29″N 14°19′20.38″E
- Country: Slovenia
- Traditional region: Upper Carniola
- Statistical region: Upper Carniola
- Municipality: Naklo
- Elevation: 407.3 m (1,336 ft)

Population (2002)
  - Total: 16
- Postal code: 4202 Naklo

Malo Naklo (pronounced [ˈmaːlɔ ˈnaːklɔ]) is a small settlement in the Municipality of Naklo in the Upper Carniola region of Slovenia. It was much reduced by the building of the new motorway and only two houses remain.

In recent years a small football pitch was built in Malo Naklo. The football ground is home to NK Naklo.
