= Podbrezje =

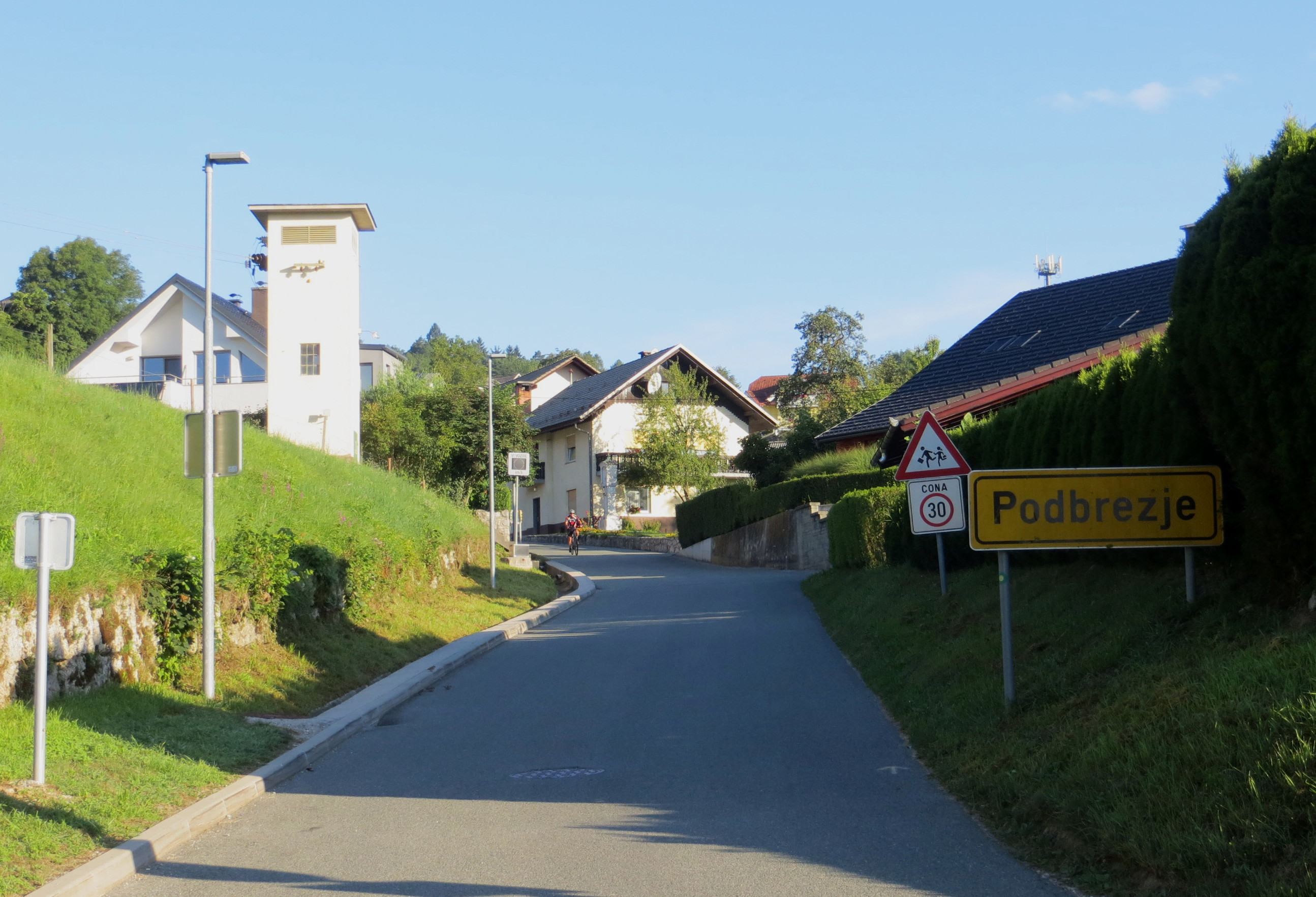

- Location in Slovenia
- Coordinates: 46°17′28.21″N 14°16′58.96″E
- Country: Slovenia
- Traditional region: Upper Carniola
- Statistical region: Upper Carniola
- Municipality: Naklo
- Elevation: 403.7 m (1,324 ft)

Population (2002)
  - Total: 739

Podbrezje (pronounced [pɔdˈbɾeːzjɛ]; German: Birkendorf) is a village in the Municipality of Naklo in the Upper Carniola region of Slovenia. It includes the hamlets of Dolenja Vas (Slovene: Dolenja vas, German: Unterbirkendorf), Srednja Vas (Slovene: Srednja vas, German: Mitterbirkendorf), Britof (German: Freithof), and Podtabor (German: Tabor), which were separate settlements before the Second World War. The settlement lies on a terrace on the left bank of the Sava River known as Dobrava. Since the early 19th century Podbrezje has been known for its orchards, which can still be seen around the village. After the Second World War, a Yugoslav labor camp for political prisoners operated in Podbrezje.

== Churches ==
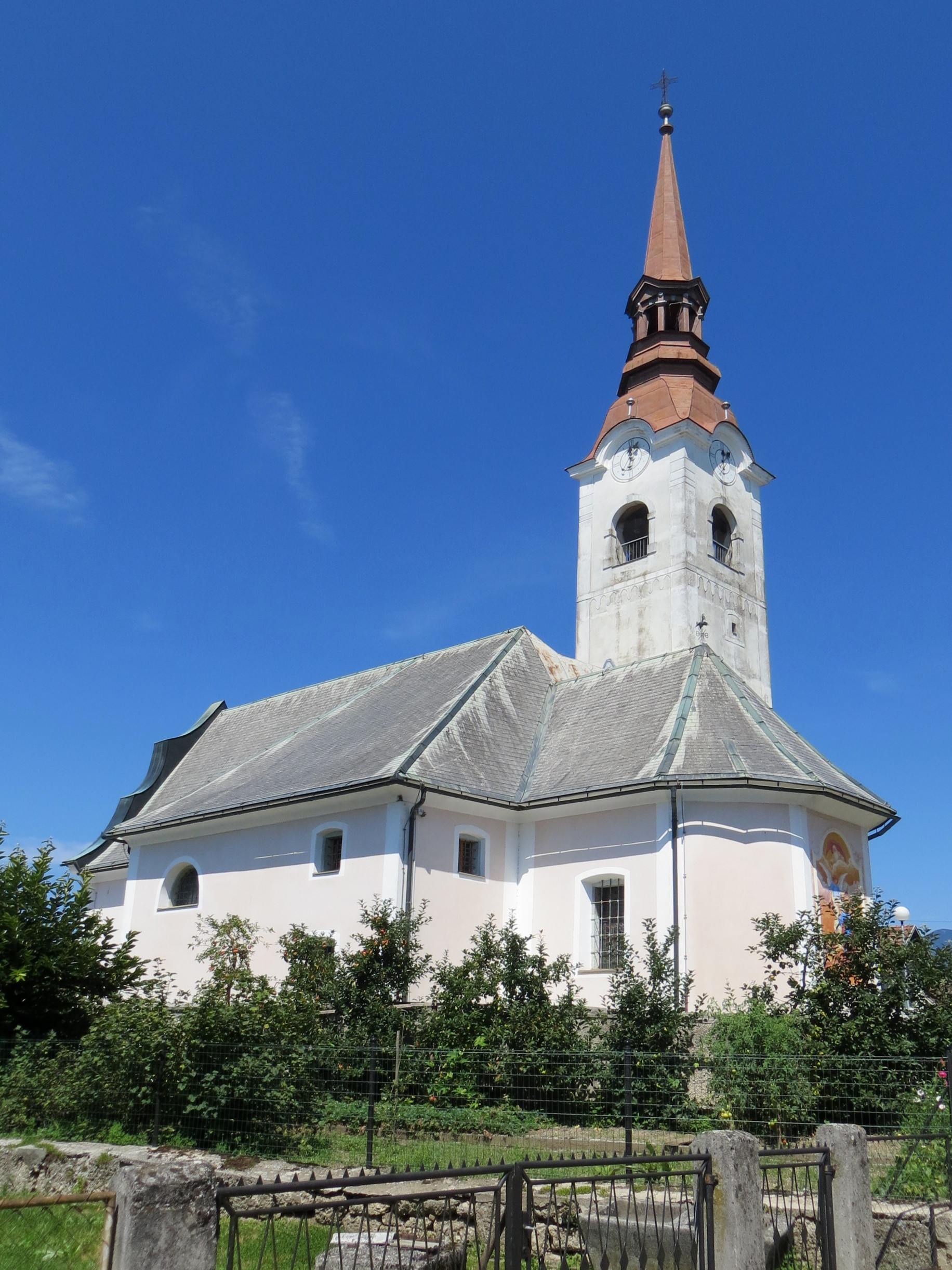
View from southeast

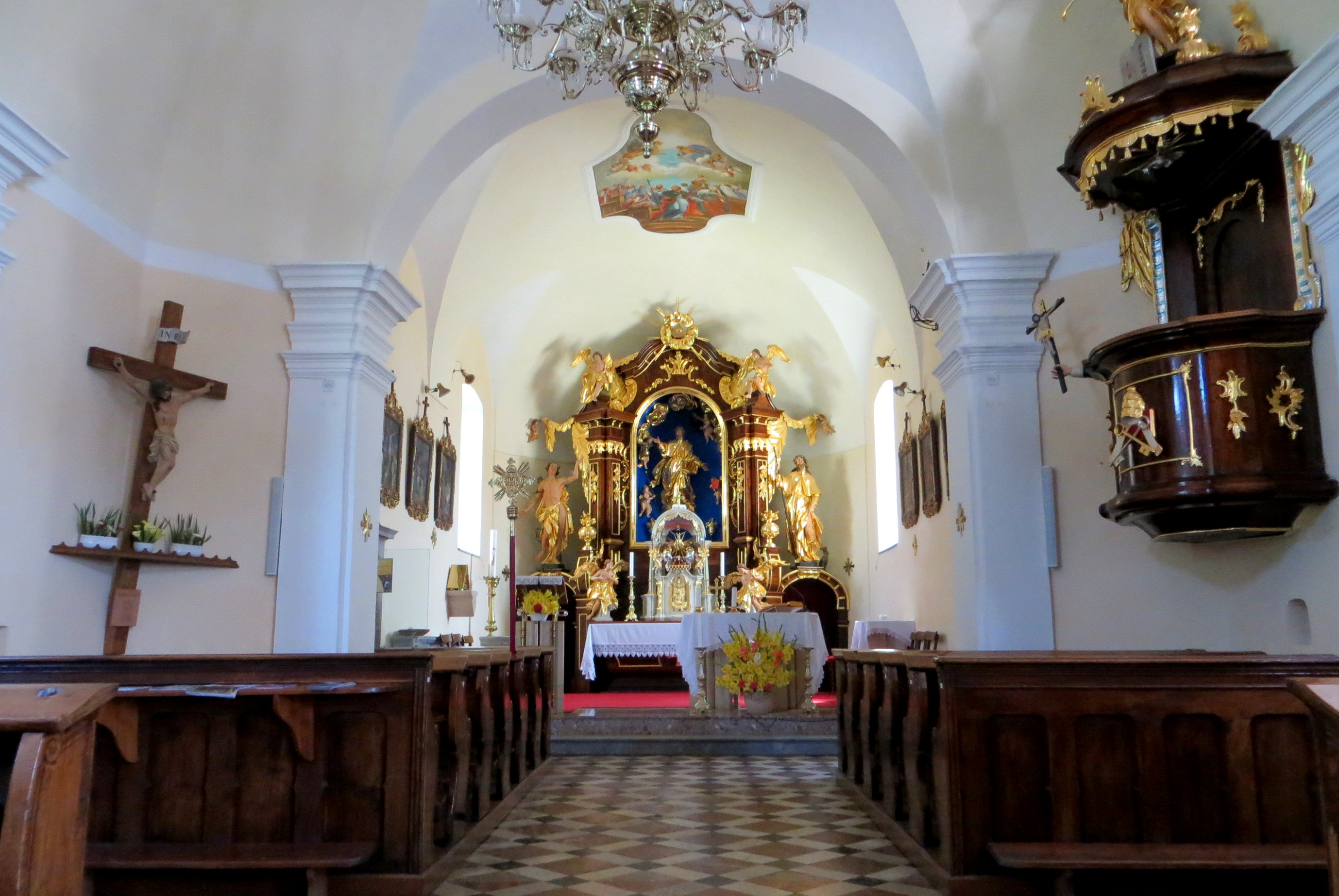
Interior

Saint James's Church

There are two churches in Podbrezje. The parish church is located in the hamlet of Britof and is dedicated to Saint James. It was originally a Gothic church that was reworked in the Baroque style in the 17th century. The Baroque altars and sculptures in the church date from the late 18th century and were created by Peter Žiwobski (1752–?). In addition to the main altar dedicated to Saint James, there are two side altars, dedicated to the Virgin Mary and John of Nepomuk. The ceiling fresco was painted by Vinko Tušek (1936–2011). The church's organ was built in 1830 by Johann Gottfried Kunath (before 1790 – after 1846). There is a cemetery on the west wide of the church.

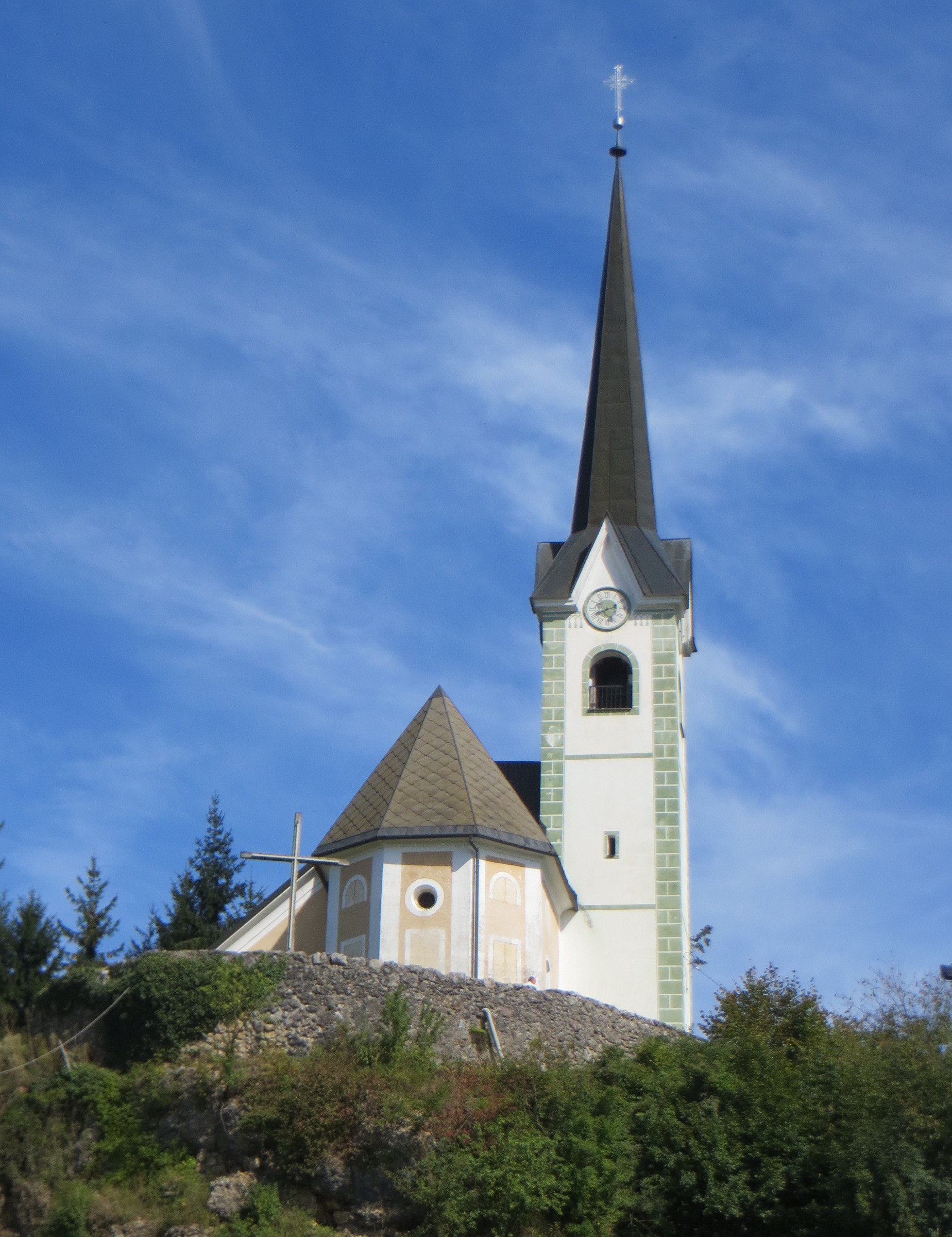
Tabor Church

The picturesque fortified Tabor Church, in the hamlet of Podtabor on a rock above the motorway from Ljubljana to the Karawanks Tunnel, is a well-known landmark on the route. It was built some time soon after 1471 as a fortification where the locals could escape from Ottoman raids. The worst Ottoman incursions across Upper Carniola and into Carinthia were in 1476 and 1477. The building of the walls around the church was conditioned by the favourable natural position on an elevation in the middle of a plain, affording a view in all directions. The walls surrounding the church are irregularly shaped and were built on two levels with a roofed walkway, balistraria, and defense tower. The defence tower overlooked the only entrance over a drawbridge. On the western side the church was fortified with a moat and dike. This was also where valuables, food, and livestock were kept. The church is dedicated to Saint Benedict and Our Lady of Sorrows. One of the paintings in the church is by Ivana Kobilca, who lived in the village for a while.

== Gallery ==
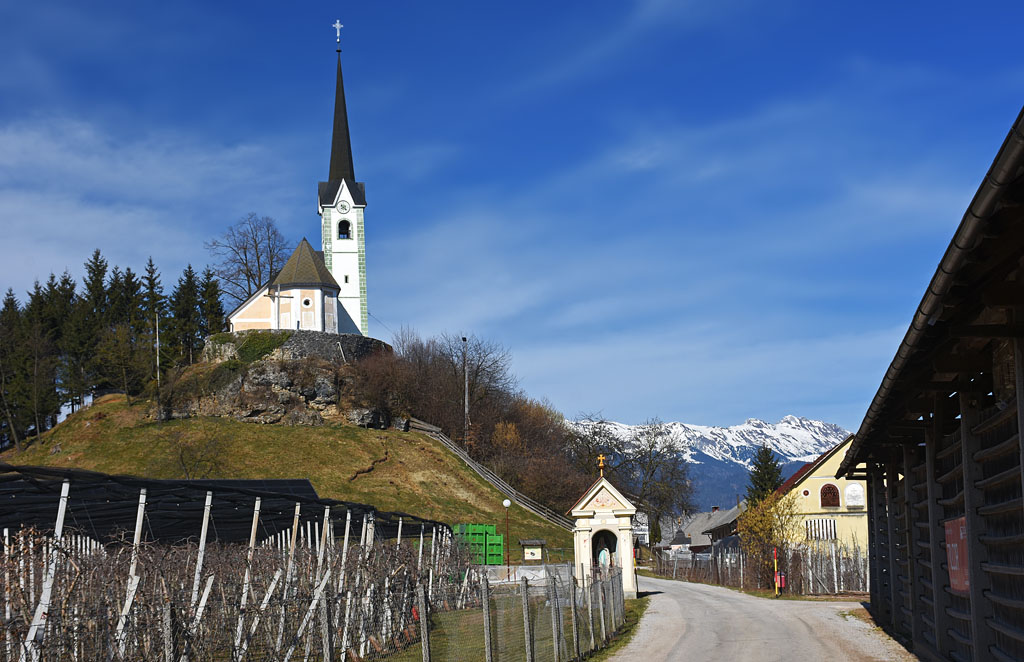
St. Mary and St. Benedikt

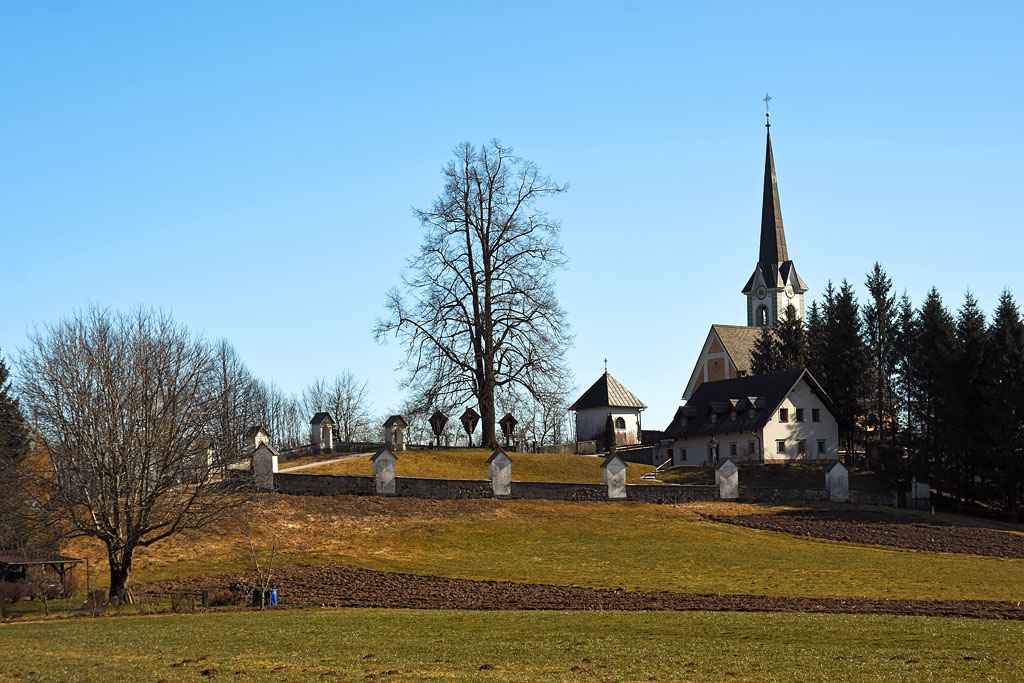
Tabor Church from the northwest

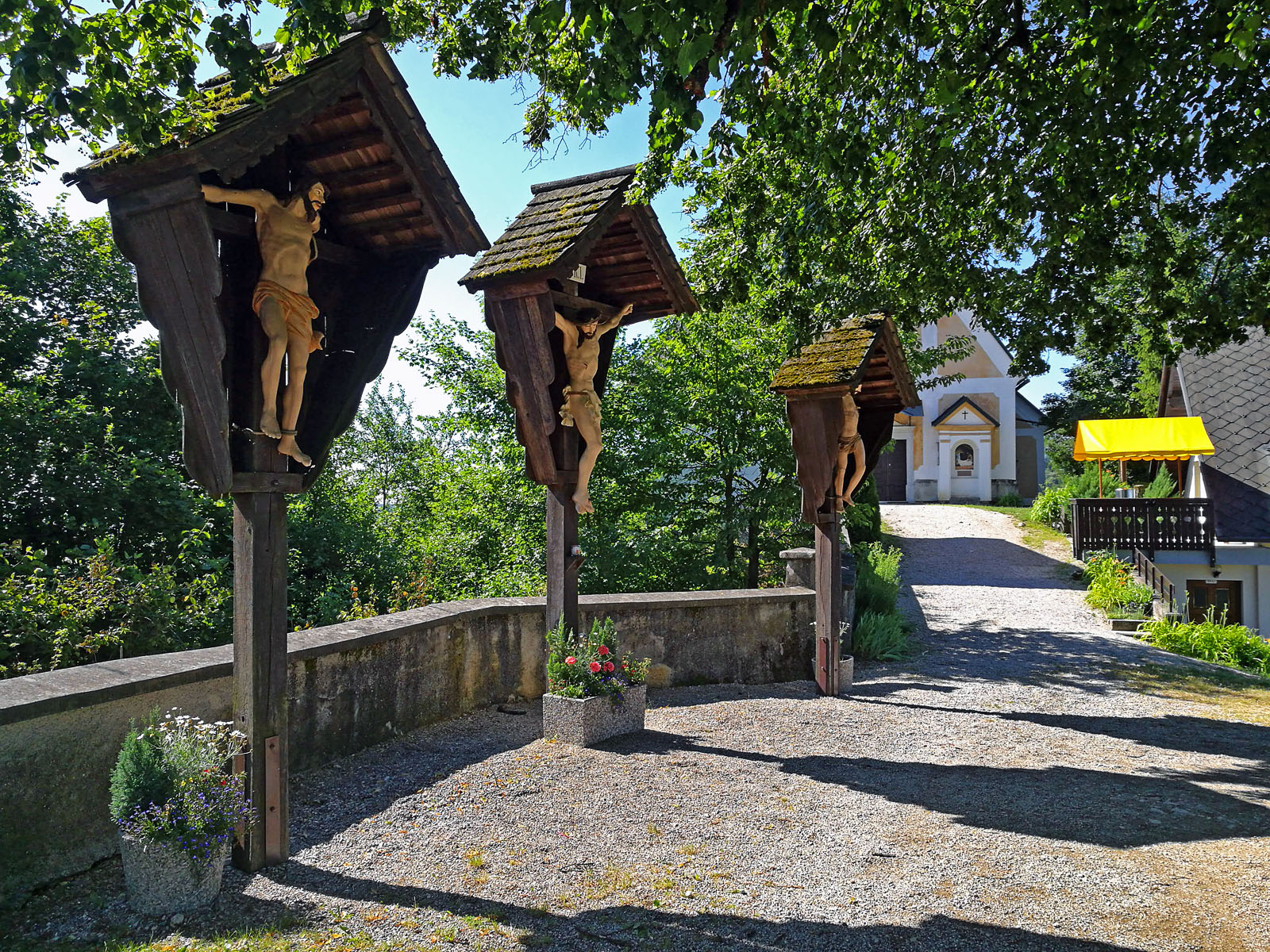
Crucifix before Podtabor church
