= Udin Woods =

Protected area in Slovenia

Coordinates: 46°17′38″N 14°19′29″E

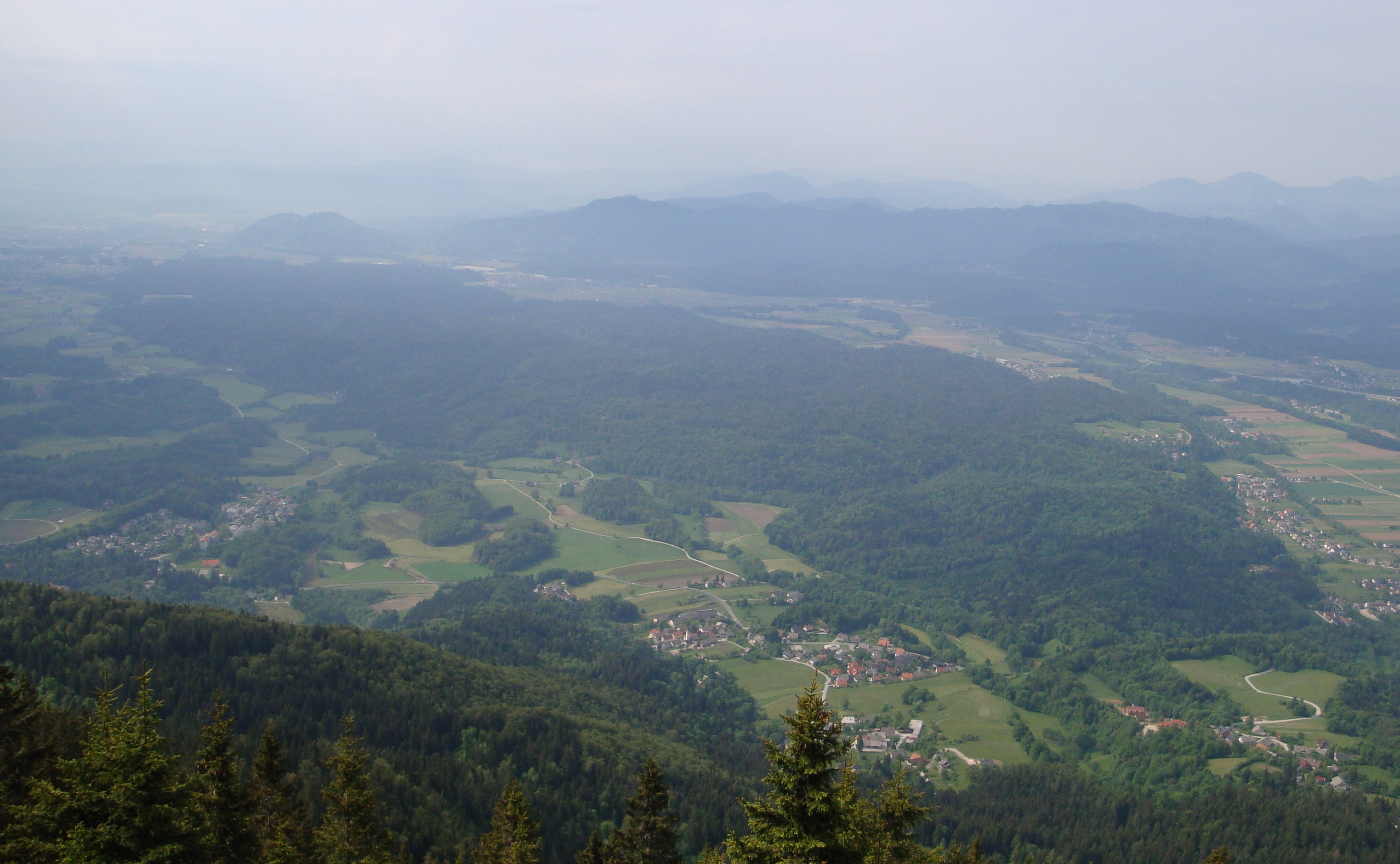
The Udin Woods seen from Mount Križe (Kriška gora)

The Udin Woods (Slovene: Udin boršt, in older sources Udnjiboršt, German: Herzogsforst) is one of the oldest glacial terraces in the Ljubljana Basin. It is a contiguous wooded area clearly delineated from its surroundings. The woods is dominated by Scots pine, and deciduous trees include sessile oak, hornbeam, and beech. It has natural value in terms of its botanical features, terrain, and geomorphology. It was given the status of a protected landscape area in 1985.

== Extent ==
The Udin Woods encompasses nearly the entire area bounded by the road from Kranj to Golnik on the east, the old road from Kranj to Tržič on the west, the A2 freeway on the south, and Mount Križe (Slovene: Kriška gora, 1,473 meters or 4,833 feet) to the north.

== Name ==
The area was attested in written sources in 1495 as Hertzogenvorsst, and in 1679–89 as Udenwald and Hertzogforst, literally 'duke's forest'. The Slovene name Udin boršt is derived from *vivodinj 'duke's' + boršt 'forest' (a borrowing from Middle High German for(e)st). The name of the hamlet of Udna Vas (< 'duke's village') has the same origin.

== Formation ==
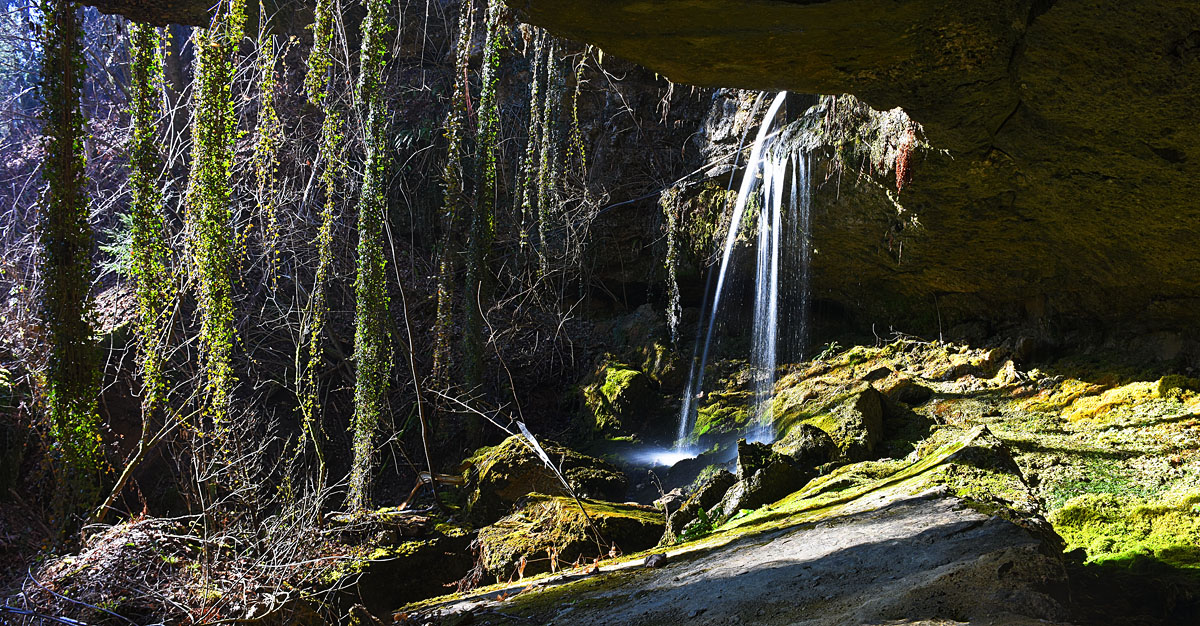
Arneš Cave (Arneševa luknja)

The Udin Woods is a glacial remnant, as shown by its gravelly or conglomerate composition. The conglomerate is dominated by limestone material; pebbles of volcanic origin are less common. Karstification took place during the Holocene interglacial, when limestone terrace flooding provided good conditions for the development of karst under a warmer climate and with abundant water. During this period various karst features were formed: sinkholes, karst caves, and karst springs, which vary in their output but never go dry because a layer of impermeable Oligocene clay lies under the conglomerate. The conglomerate that composes the terraces is 10 meters (33 ft) to 15 meters (49 ft) thick. Springs appear at the contact points; their output is less variable than in Dinaric karst areas and they have a constant flow. The character of the karst in the Udin Woods is distinct from other karst areas in Slovenia.

== Features ==
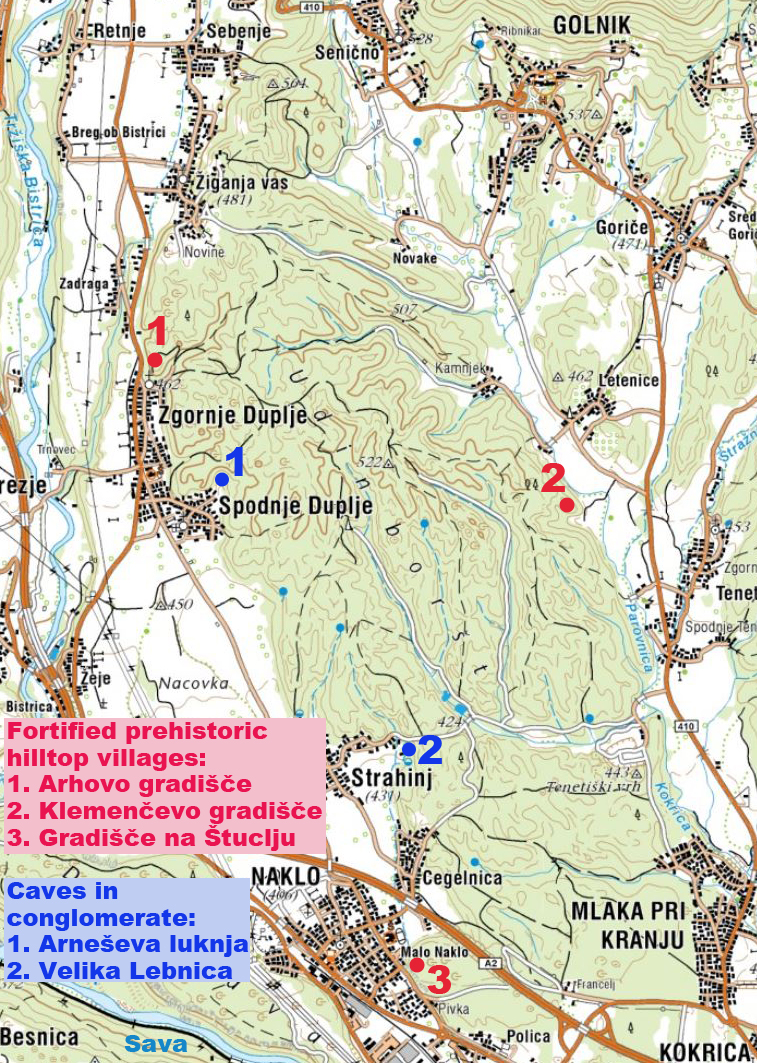
Archaeological sites and caves

The geology of the Udin Woods includes karst phenomena that have formed in the 100-meter (330 ft) thick layer of conglomerate, especially caves up to 1,000 meters (3,300 ft) long.

The area was already populated in prehistoric times. The three most important archaeological sites had fortified hilltop settlements: the Arh Hillfort (Arhovo gradišče), Klemenc Hillfort (Klemenčevo gradišče), and Štucelj Hillfort (Gradišče na Štuclju). There are visible remnants of moats and elevated rings where wooden palisades protected the settlements. Some settlements also existed during Roman times, such as the Štucelj Hillfort, where the Romans built a guard tower.
