= Municipality of Naklo =

Municipality of Slovenia

Municipality of Naklo Občina Naklo
- Municipality
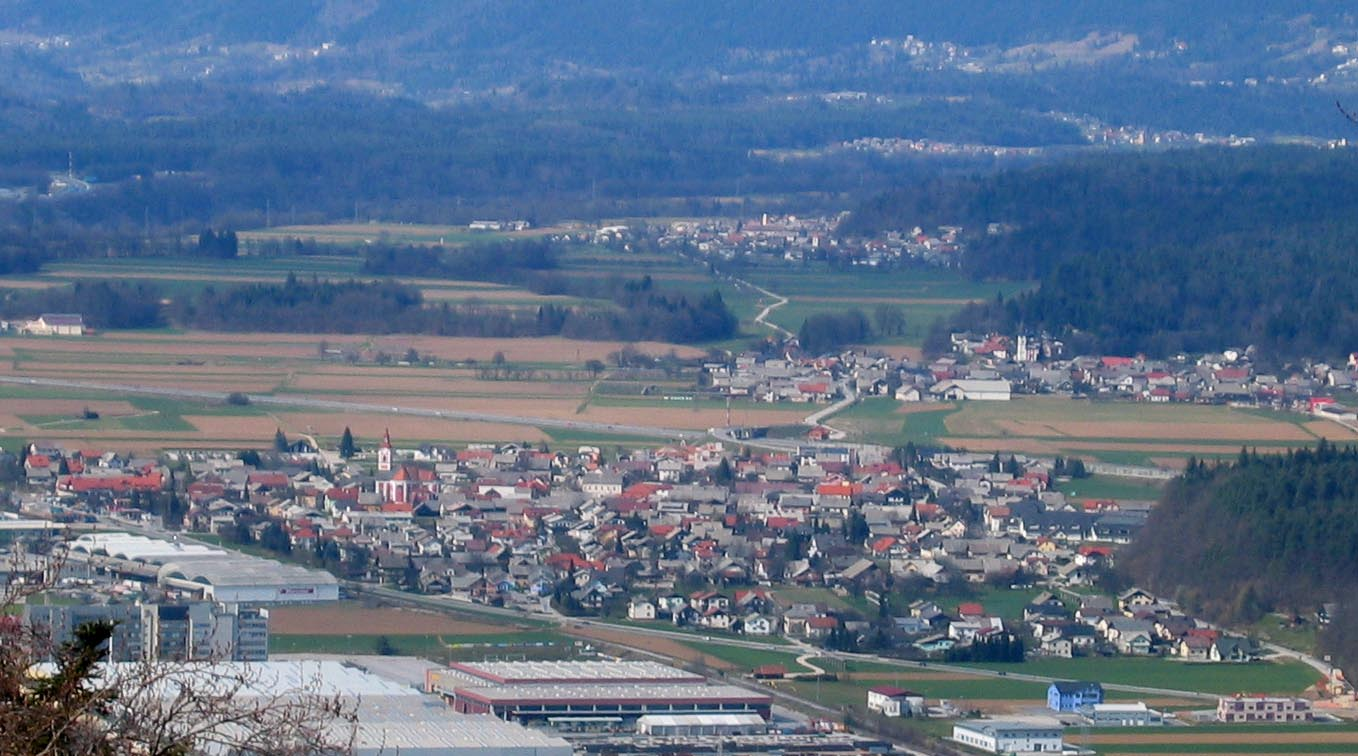

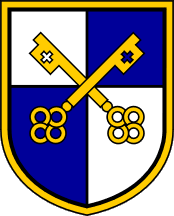
- Coat of arms

- Location of the Municipality of Naklo in Slovenia
- Coordinates: 46°16′N 14°19′E
- Country: Slovenia

Government
  - Mayor: Ivan Meglič (SLS)

Area
  - Total: 28.3 km^{2} (10.9 sq mi)

Population (2002)
  - Total: 5,211
  - Density: 184/km^{2} (477/sq mi)
- Time zone: UTC+01 (CET)
  - Summer (DST): UTC+02 (CEST)
- Website: www.naklo.si

The Municipality of Naklo (pronounced [ˈnaːklɔ]; Slovene: Občina Naklo) is one of the municipalities in northwestern Slovenia. Its seat is Naklo. The municipality, established in 1994, lies at an elevation of 407 metres (1,335 ft) and has 5,020 residents. It has an area of 28.3 square kilometres (10.9 sq mi).

== Geography ==
The Municipality of Naklo in the Ljubljana Basin lies in the Kranj Plain and in the middle of the Naklo Valley between the two oldest terraces of the Sava and Tržič Bistrica rivers. It is surrounded by the Dobrava conglomerate terrace and Udin Woods (Slovene: Udin boršt). To the south and east it borders the City Municipality of Kranj, to the north the Municipality of Tržič, and to the west the Municipality of Radovljica. Although the Naklo Valley is regarded as narrow, the Municipality of Naklo has good road connections. The freeway from Ljubljana to Jesenice passes the edge of the Udin Woods, and on the west side of the woods there is a road to Jesenice and Tržič. Both lead to border crossings with Italy and Austria.

=== Settlements ===
In addition to the municipal seat of Naklo, the municipality also includes the following settlements:

- Bistrica
- Cegelnica
- Gobovce
- Malo Naklo
- Okroglo
- Podbrezje
- Polica
- Spodnje Duplje
- Strahinj
- Zadraga
- Zgornje Duplje
- Žeje

== Economy ==
Due to its location, transport links, and proximity to major economic centers across the country, the Municipality of Naklo has developed small businesses and intensive farming activities. Some of the population works locally, but many commute to work to Kranj and Tržič. The municipality is seeking to promote the development of agriculture, small business, and tourism.

== Tourism ==
Several historical sights in the Municipality of Naklo are tourist attractions. Camping is available along the Tržič Bistrica River. Natural attractions include the Udin Woods and forested Dobrava terrace. Other activities include tennis, horseback riding, cycling, fishing, and hiking.
