= Kokra (disambiguation) =

Kokra is a river in Slovenia

Kokra may also refer to:

- Kokra (settlement), a settlement in Slovenia
- Kokra (instrument), a musical instrument from Kerala, India
- Ko Kra, group of small rocky islets in Thailand
