= Hrib, Preddvor =

Hrib
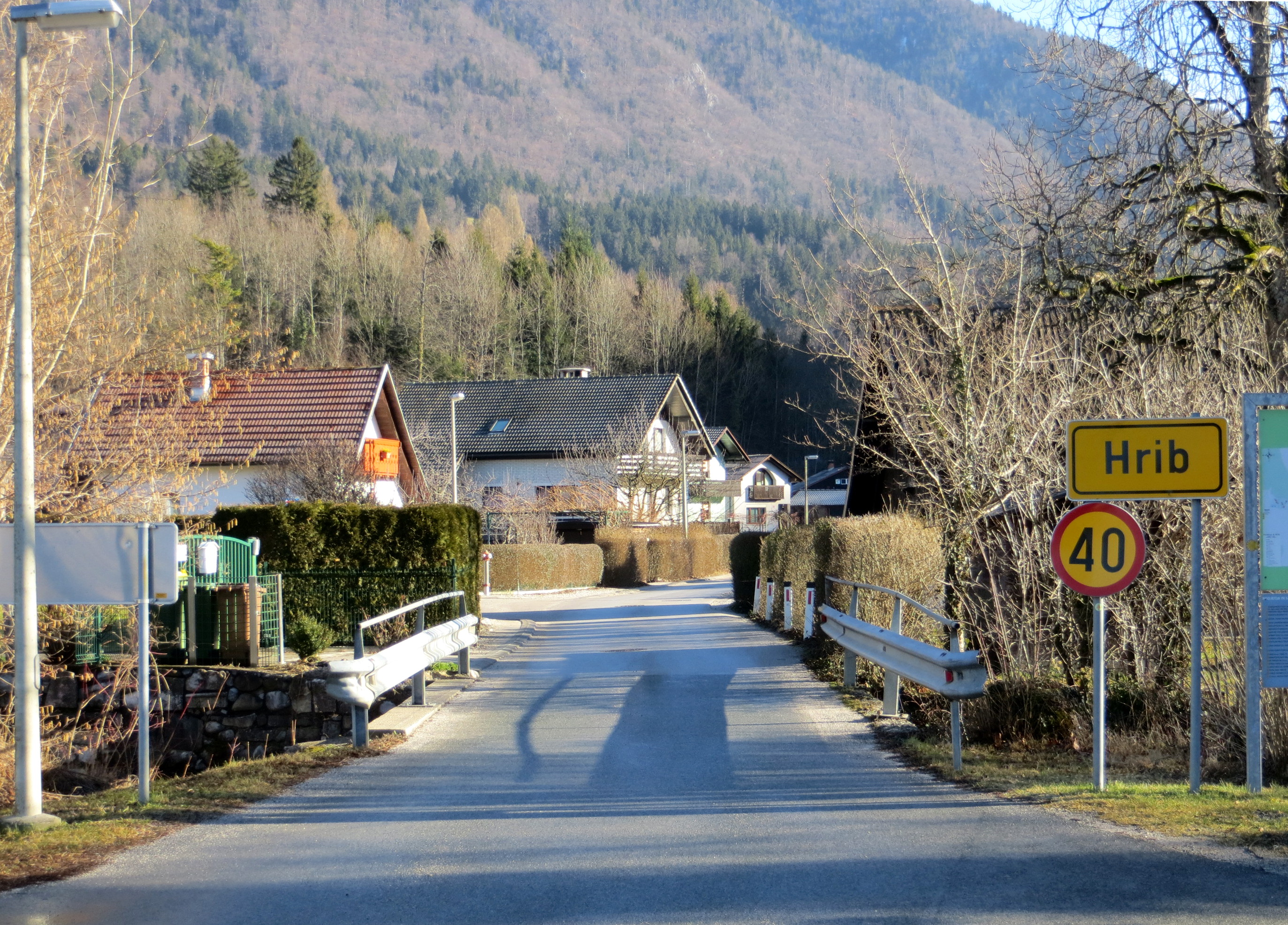

- Location in Slovenia
- Coordinates: 46°18′3.17″N 14°25′45.69″E
- Country: Slovenia
- Traditional region: Upper Carniola
- Statistical region: Upper Carniola
- Municipality: Preddvor

Area
  - Total: 0.48 km^{2} (0.19 sq mi)
- Elevation: 459.2 m (1,507 ft)

Population (2002)
  - Total: 62

Hrib (pronounced [ˈxɾiːp]) is a settlement on the right bank of the Kokra River on the outskirts of Preddvor in the Upper Carniola region of Slovenia.

== Geography ==
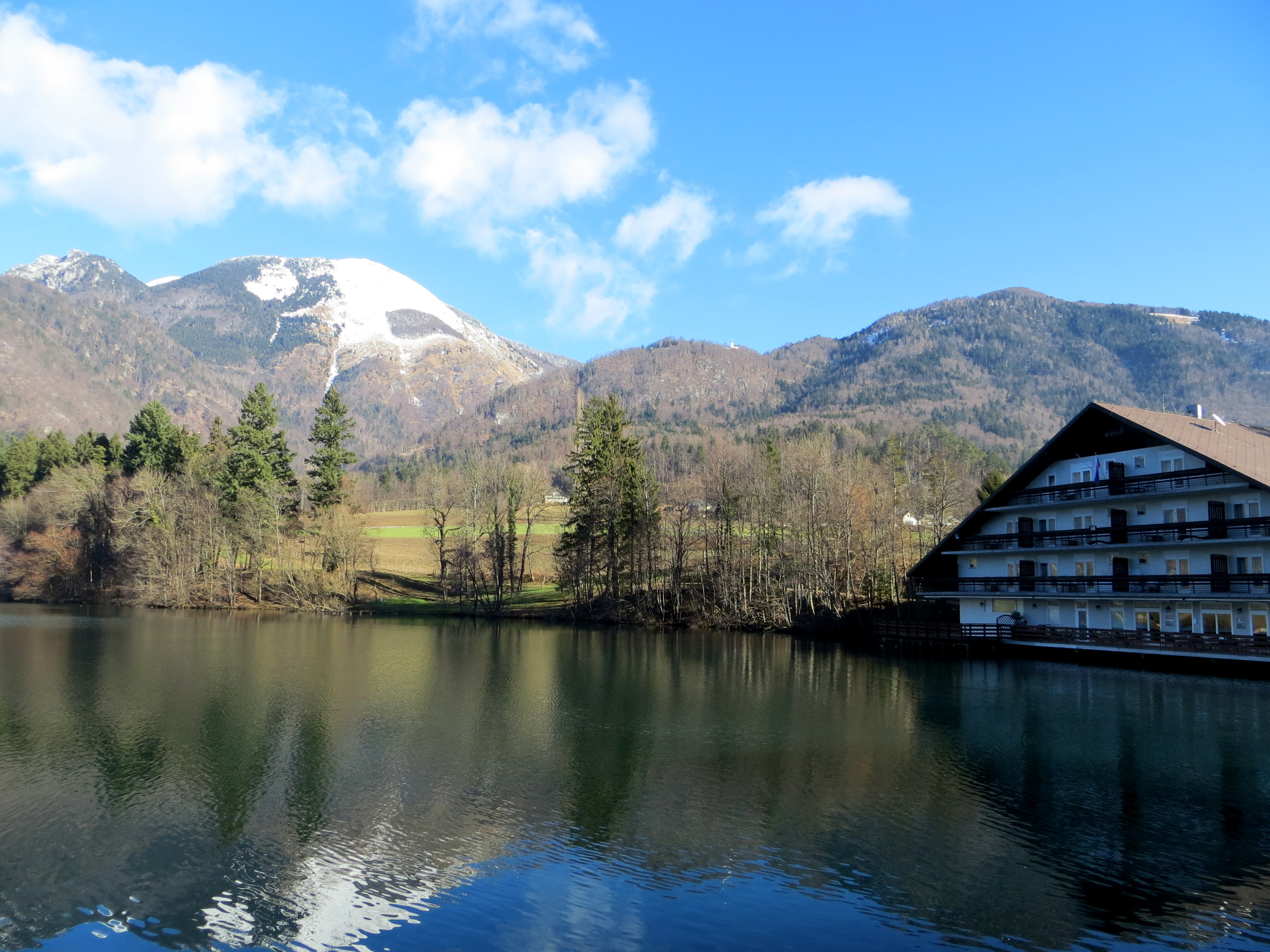
Lake Črnava

Lake Črnava, which is fed by Bistrica Creek and has an outflow into the Kokra River, lies in the northwest part of Hrib.
