= Nova Vas, Preddvor =

Nova Vas
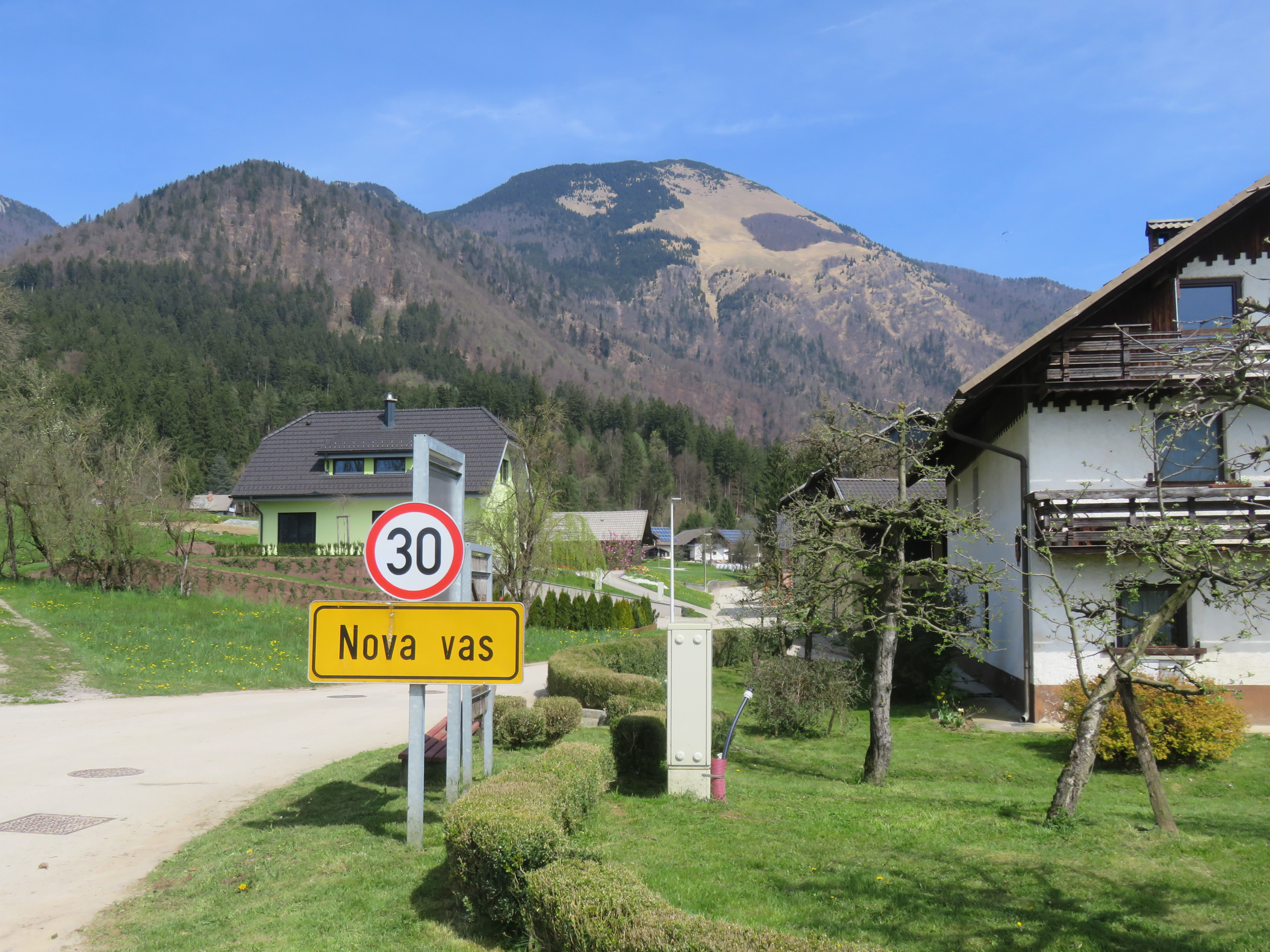

- Location in Slovenia
- Coordinates: 46°18′27.74″N 14°25′23.89″E
- Country: Slovenia
- Traditional region: Upper Carniola
- Statistical region: Upper Carniola
- Municipality: Preddvor

Area
  - Total: 0.39 km^{2} (0.15 sq mi)
- Elevation: 498 m (1,634 ft)

Population (2002)
  - Total: 120

Nova Vas (pronounced [ˈnɔːʋa ˈʋaːs]; Slovene: Nova vas, German: Neudorf) is a settlement north of Preddvor in the Upper Carniola region of Slovenia.
