= Mače =

Mače may refer to:

- Mače, Croatia, a village in Krapina-Zagorje County
- Mače, Slovenia, a village near Preddvor
