= Tupaliče =

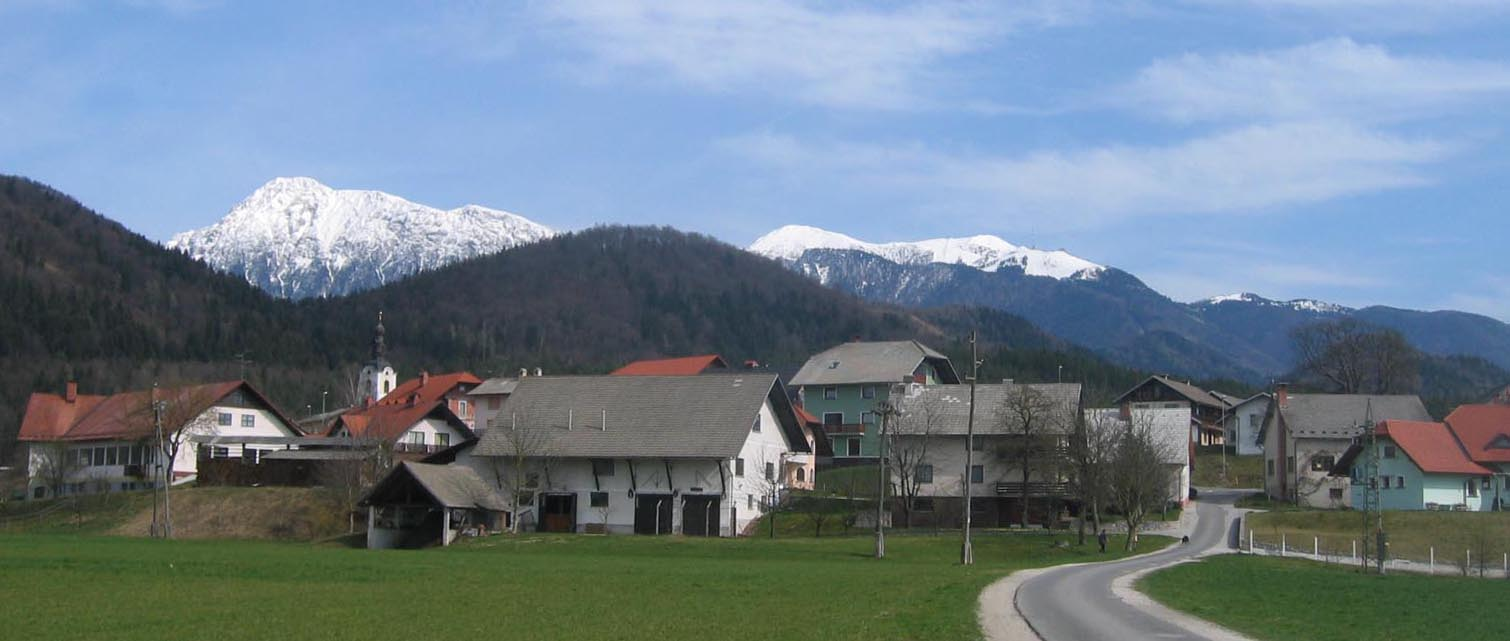

- Location in Slovenia
- Coordinates: 46°17′22.04″N 14°25′33.92″E
- Country: Slovenia
- Traditional region: Upper Carniola
- Statistical region: Upper Carniola
- Municipality: Preddvor

Area
  - Total: 2.25 km^{2} (0.87 sq mi)
- Elevation: 455.1 m (1,493 ft)

Population (2002)
  - Total: 351

Tupaliče (pronounced [ˈtuːpalitʃɛ]; German: Tupalitsch) is a village south of Preddvor in the Upper Carniola region of Slovenia.

The local church is dedicated to Saint Clement. It is a Romanesque building with a Baroque sanctuary and a later belfry. Frescos in the nave date to ca. 1400 and there are 16th-century images of Saint Christopher and of the Crucifixion of Jesus on the south exterior wall.
