= Breg ob Kokri =

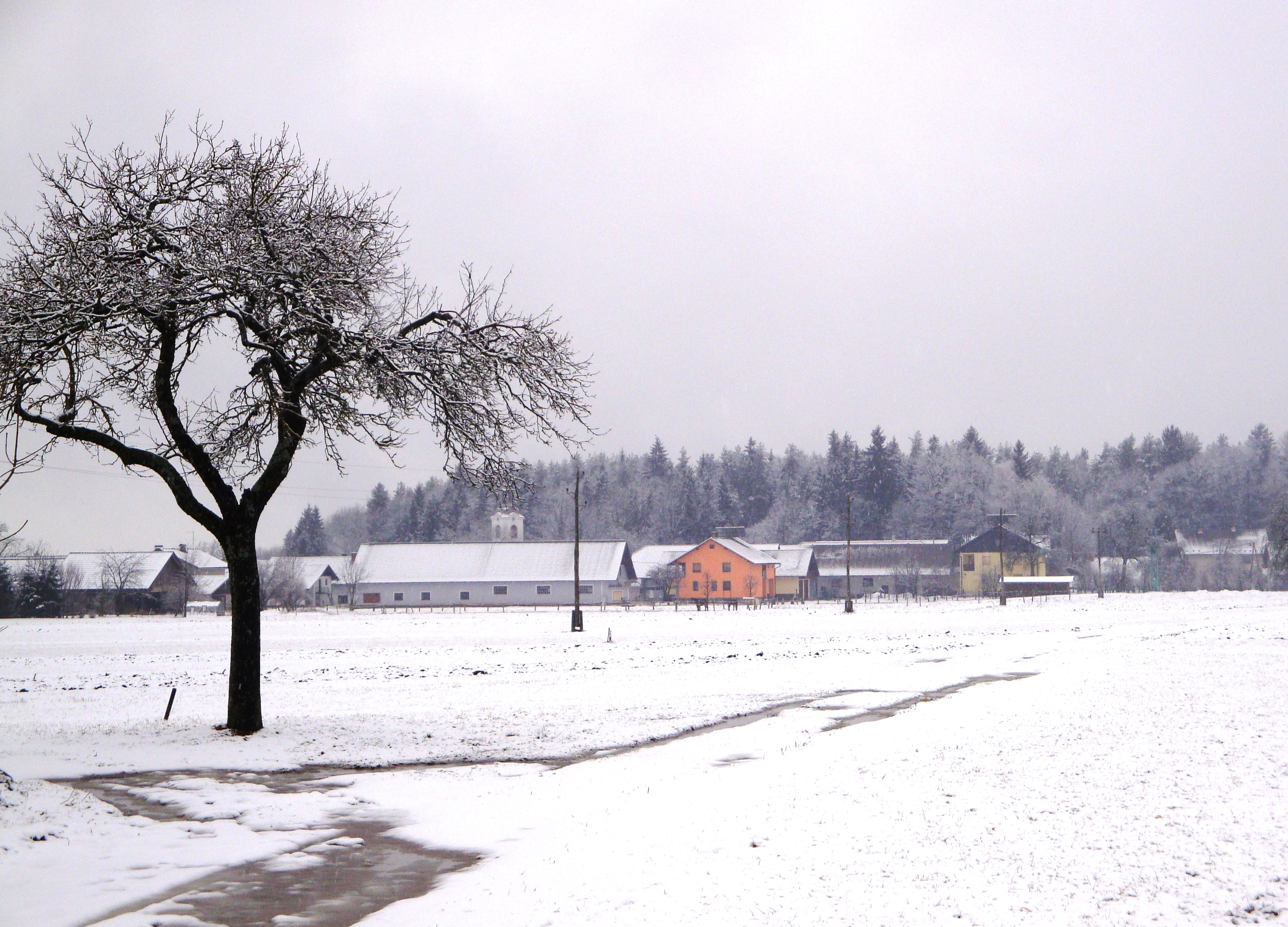

- Location in Slovenia
- Coordinates: 46°17′25.79″N 14°25′6.79″E
- Country: Slovenia
- Traditional region: Upper Carniola
- Statistical region: Upper Carniola
- Municipality: Preddvor

Area
  - Total: 1.42 km^{2} (0.55 sq mi)
- Elevation: 454.6 m (1,491 ft)

Population (2002)
  - Total: 105

Breg ob Kokri (pronounced [ˈbɾeːk ɔp ˈkoːkɾi]; German: Ranndorf) is a village on the right bank of the Kokra River in the Municipality of Preddvor in the Upper Carniola region of Slovenia.

== Name ==
Breg ob Kokri was attested in historical sources as Rain and Rein between 1147 and 1154, and as Rayn in 1344. The name of the settlement was changed from Breg to Breg ob Kokri in 1955. In the past, the German name was Ranndorf.

== Church ==
The village church is dedicated to Saint Leonard. Although it has a Baroque belfry, it has one of the best preserved medieval interiors in Slovenia. At the end of the nave a painted archway leading into the sanctuary has two layers of frescos with depictions of Saint George and the Dragon, Saint Leonard, and Saint Nicholas. The frescos date to the mid-15th century. The unique wooden ceiling is painted with 30 individual scenes and dates to circa 1480. The vault above the altar is also painted. The original stained glass was stolen, but copies of the original have been installed in its place. The gilded altars are from the late 17th century.
