= Zgornja Bela =

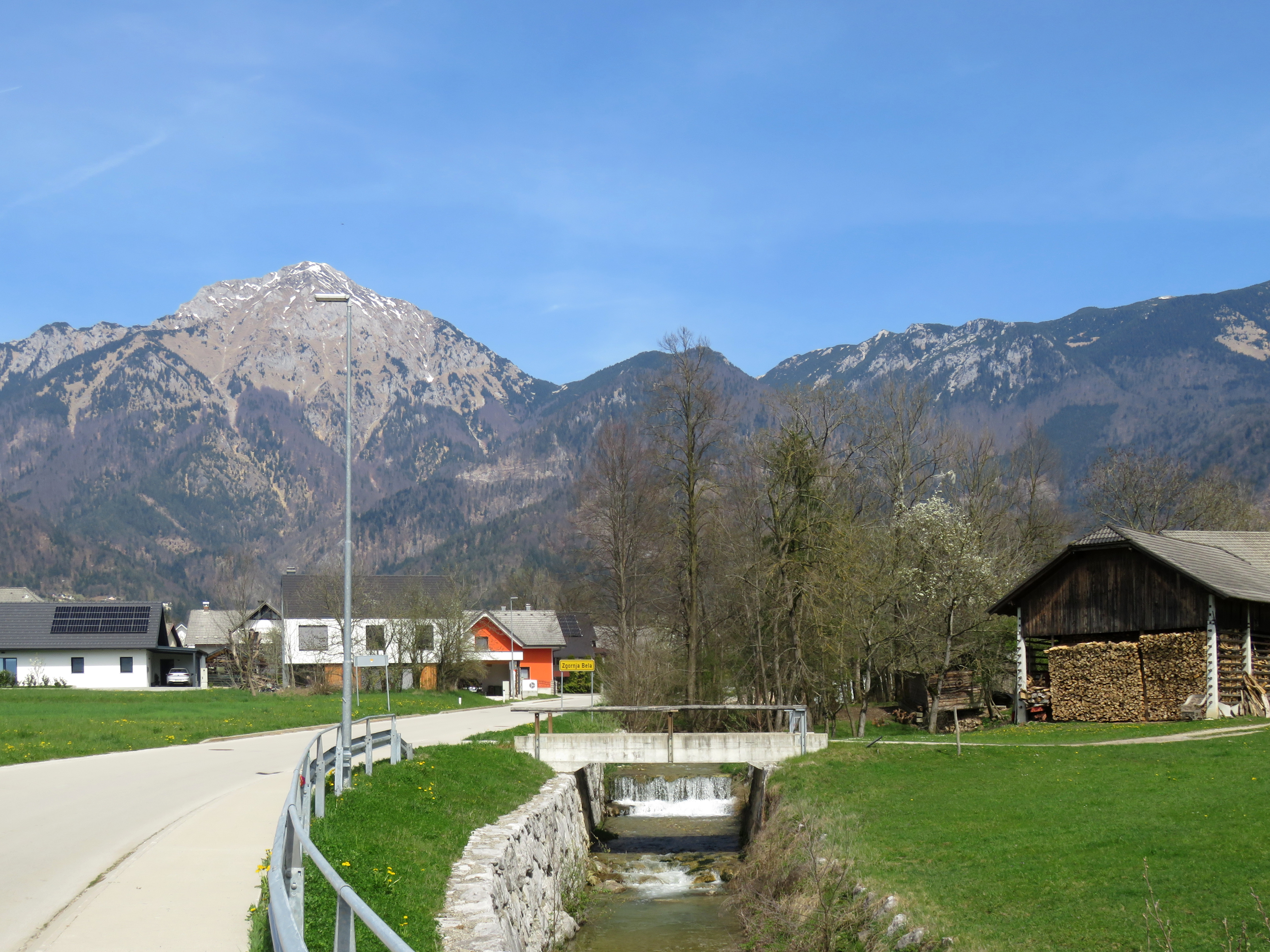

- Location in Slovenia
- Coordinates: 46°18′1.73″N 14°24′0.98″E
- Country: Slovenia
- Traditional region: Upper Carniola
- Statistical region: Upper Carniola
- Municipality: Preddvor

Area
  - Total: 1.77 km^{2} (0.68 sq mi)
- Elevation: 490.7 m (1,610 ft)

Population (2002)
  - Total: 298

Zgornja Bela (pronounced [ˈzɡoːɾnja ˈbeːla]; German: Obervellach) is a settlement west of Preddvor in the Upper Carniola region of Slovenia.
