= Kev =

Kev, KEV or keV can refer to:

== Given name ==
- Kev Adams, French comedian, actor, screenwriter and film producer born Kevin Smadja in 1991
- Kevin Kev Carmody (born 1946), Indigenous Australian singer-songwriter
- Kev Coghlan (born 1988), Scottish Grand Prix motorcycle racer
- Kev Hopper (born 1961), English composer and musician, bass guitarist with the 1980s band Stump
- Kevin Kev Lingard (born 1942), Australian politician
- Kev Orkian (born 1974), British-Armenian musician, comedian and actor
- Kev F. Sutherland (born 1961), Scottish comedian and comic strip creator
- Kevin Kev Walker, British comics artist and illustrator

== Other uses ==
- Kiloelectronvolt (keV), a unit of energy
- Krefelder Eislauf-Verein 1936 e.V. (KEV), original name of Krefeld Pinguine, a German ice hockey team formed in 1936
- kev, ISO 639-3 code for the Kanikkaran language of southern India
- KEV, IATA airport code for Halli Airport, a military airport in Kuorevesi, Jämsä, Finland
- Kapar Energy Ventures Sdn Bhd (KEV), who operate Sultan Salahuddin Abdul Aziz Power Station
- Key/Encoded-Value (KEV), in the OpenURL standard and others
- Known Exploited Vulnerabilities (KEV) catalog
- Commissariat for Jewish Affairs (KEV), a Bulgarian government agency responsible for the Holocaust in Bulgaria

== See also ==
- Kevin, a given name occasionally shortened to "Kev"
- Kevin Buzzacott (born 1947), Australian Aboriginal activist often referred to as "Uncle Kev"
- Kevin McQuay (1949–2005), Australian cleaning products entrepreneur nicknamed "Big Kev"
