= Spodnja Bela =

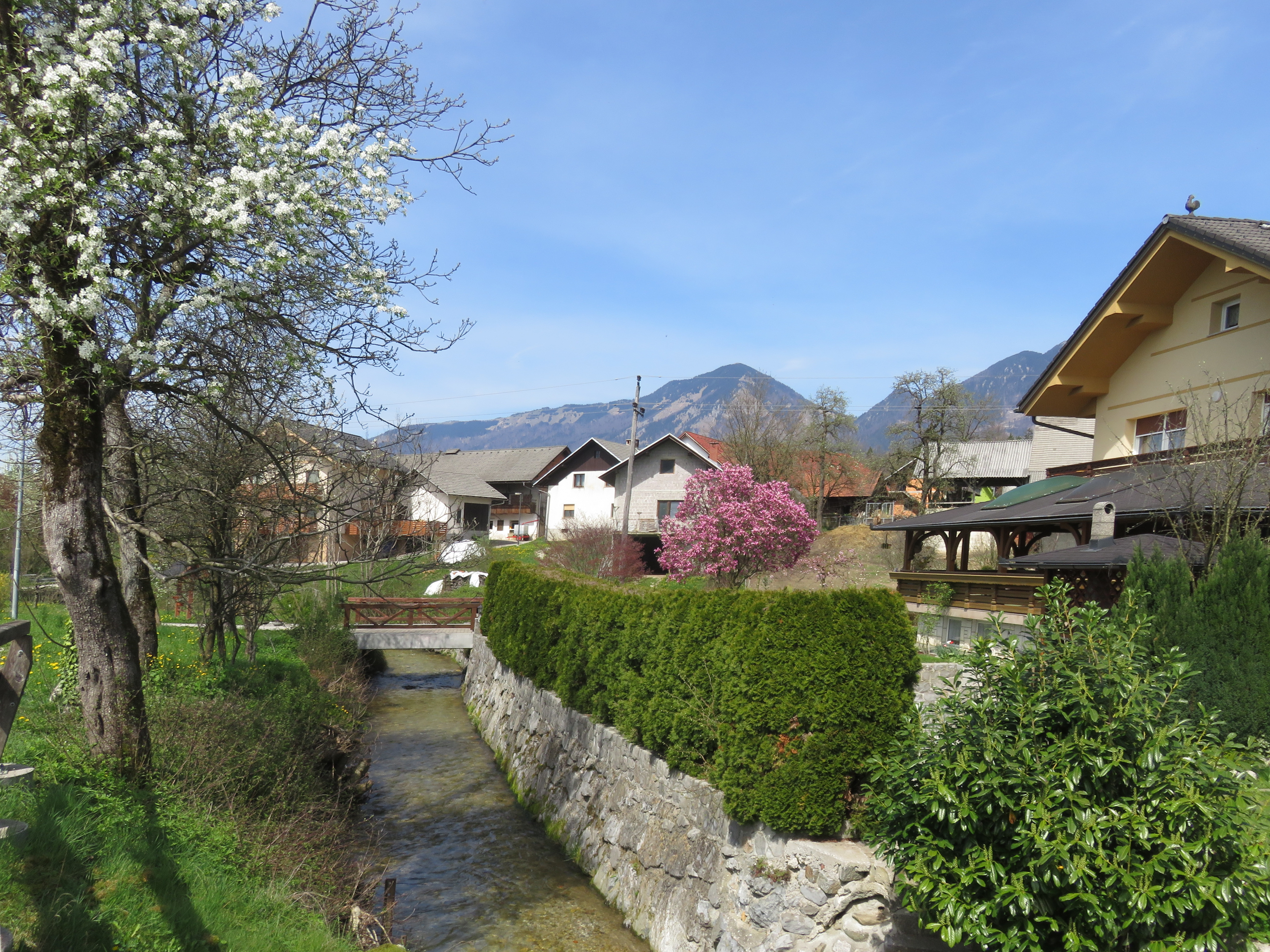

- Location in Slovenia
- Coordinates: 46°17′39.14″N 14°23′15.43″E
- Country: Slovenia
- Traditional region: Upper Carniola
- Statistical region: Upper Carniola
- Municipality: Preddvor

Area
  - Total: 1.63 km^{2} (0.63 sq mi)
- Elevation: 457.9 m (1,502 ft)

Population (2002)
  - Total: 82

Spodnja Bela (pronounced [ˈspoːdnja ˈbeːla]; German: Untervellach) is a settlement in the Municipality of Preddvor in the Upper Carniola region of Slovenia.
