= Hraše pri Preddvoru =

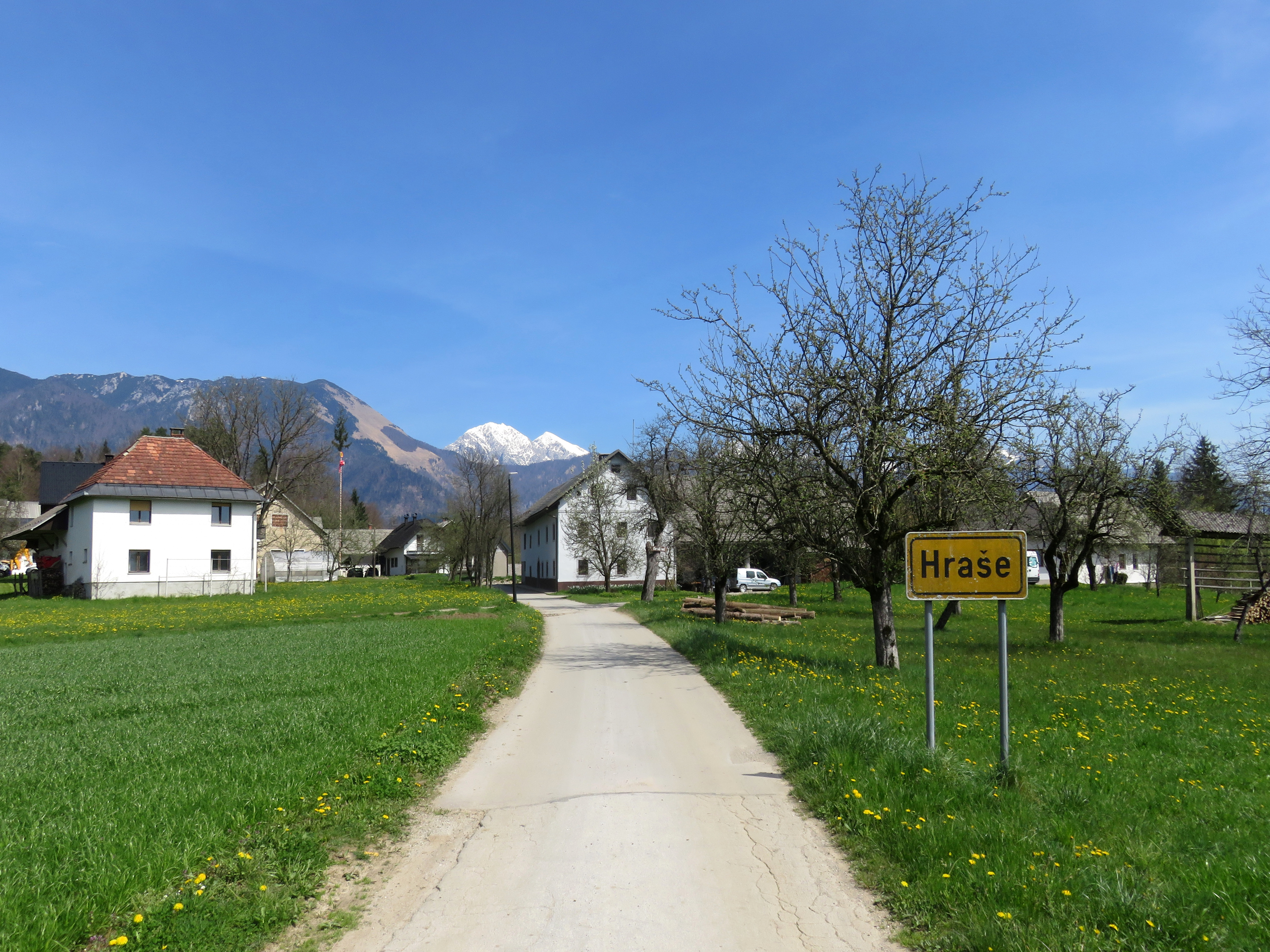

- Location in Slovenia
- Coordinates: 46°17′35.64″N 14°22′26.88″E
- Country: Slovenia
- Traditional region: Upper Carniola
- Statistical region: Upper Carniola
- Municipality: Preddvor

Area
  - Total: 1.00 km^{2} (0.39 sq mi)
- Elevation: 438.7 m (1,439 ft)

Population (2002)
  - Total: 25

Hraše pri Preddvoru (pronounced [ˈxɾaːʃɛ pɾi pɾɛˈdʋɔːɾu]) is a small settlement in the Municipality of Preddvor in the Upper Carniola region of Slovenia.

== Name ==
The name of the settlement was changed from Hraše to Hraše pri Preddvoru in 1953.
