= Dvorje, Cerklje na Gorenjskem =

Dvorje
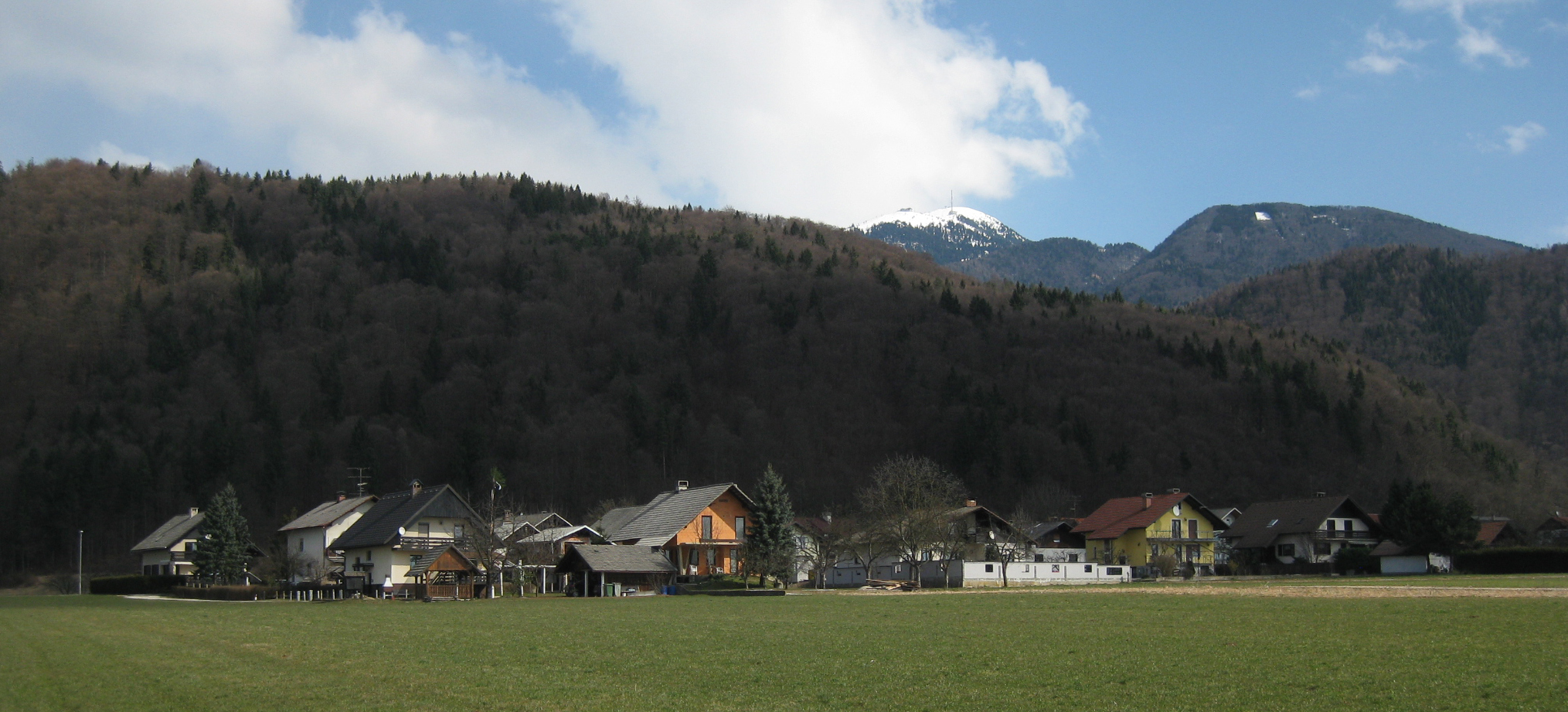

- Location in Slovenia
- Coordinates: 46°15′37.15″N 14°29′11.7″E
- Country: Slovenia
- Traditional Region: Upper Carniola
- Statistical region: Upper Carniola
- Municipality: Cerklje na Gorenjskem
- Elevation: 416.5 m (1,366 ft)

Population (2020)
  - Total: 471

Dvorje (pronounced [ˈdʋɔːɾjɛ]) is a village in the Municipality of Cerklje na Gorenjskem in the Upper Carniola region of Slovenia.

== Geography ==
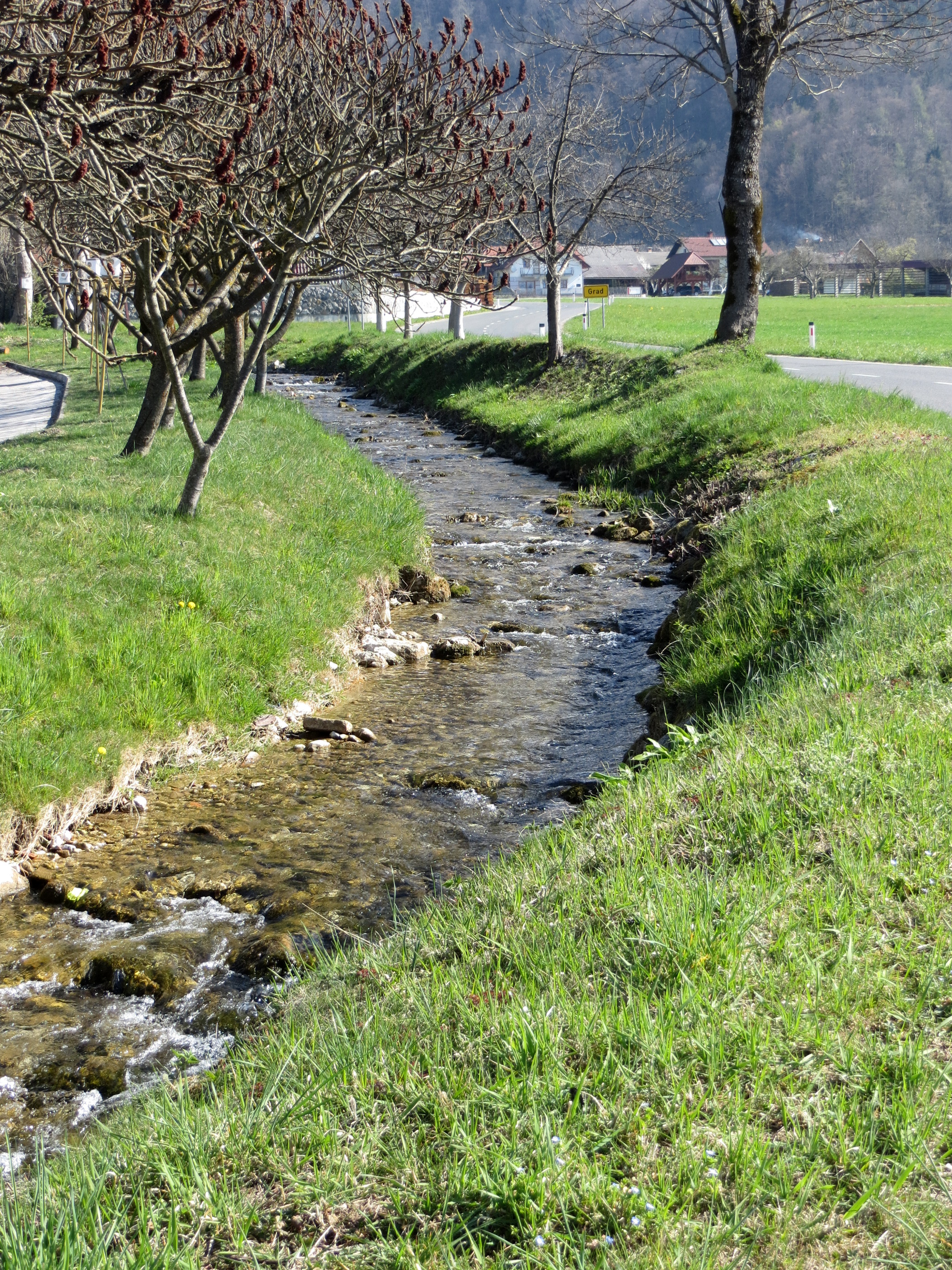
Reka Creek in Dvorje

Dvorje stands at the top of an alluvial fan on the right bank of Reka Creek at the point where it leaves a gorge and enters the Cerklje Plain (Slovene: Cerkljansko polje). The houses in the village are clustered along secondary roads adjoining the main road between Cerklje na Gorenjskem and Visoko. The soil is sandy with limited fertility.

== Name ==
The name Dvorje is a contraction of the plural demonym *Dvor′ane 'residents of Dvor'. The name Dvor literally means 'manor' and is a relatively common toponym in Slovenia; in addition to 'manor', it may also refer to a farm with outbuildings, an estate, a (fenced-in) courtyard, or a barnyard, as well as a medieval agricultural estate comprising up to 40 farms.

== History ==
Strmol Castle stands west of the village, below Dvorje Hill (Slovene: Dvorjanski hrib). It was cited in a number of sources dating back to the 14th to 16th centuries. Before the Second World War, a sawmill and a roller mill operated in the village.

== Church ==
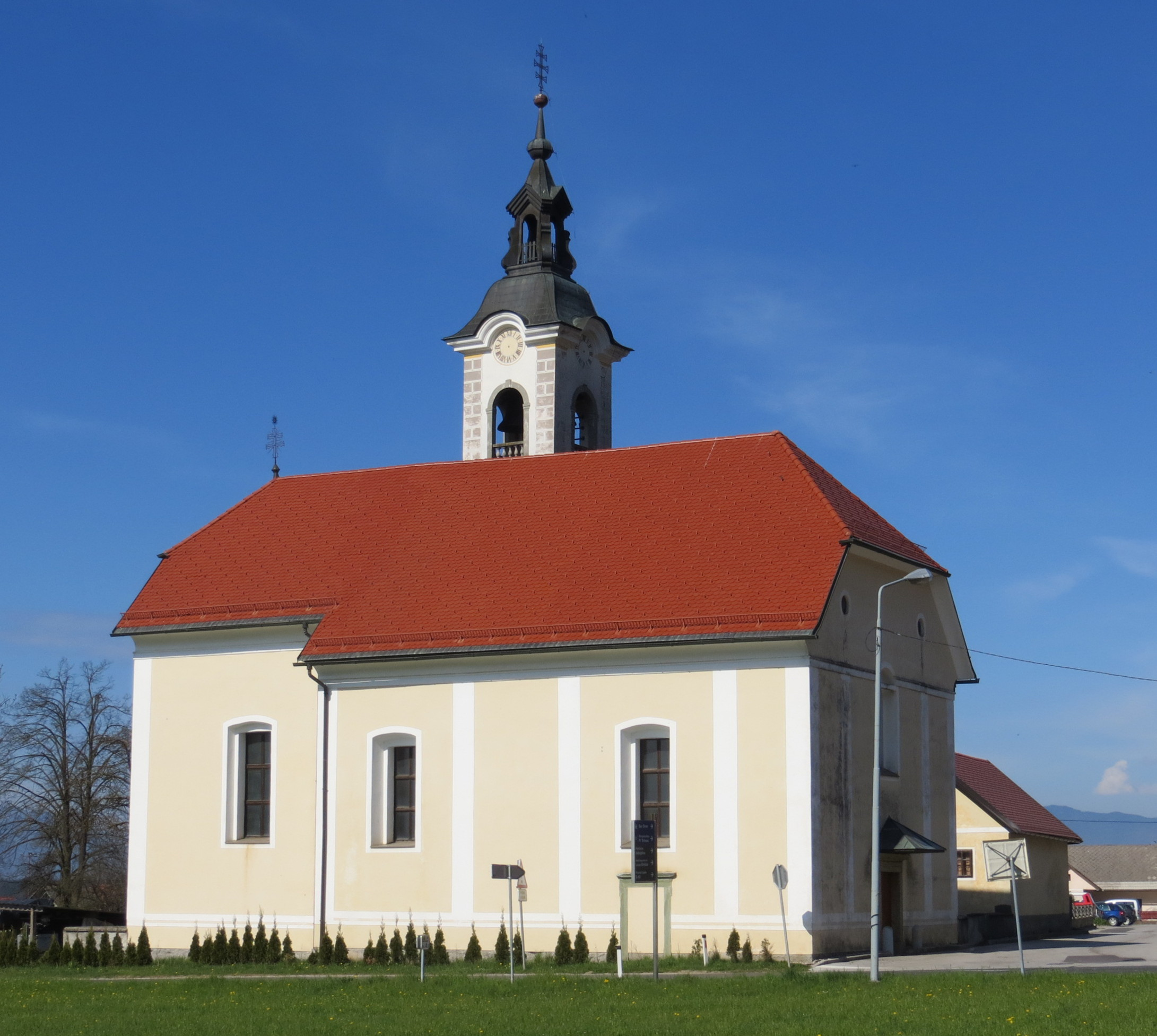
Saint Nicholas' Church

The local church is dedicated to Saint Nicholas and belongs to the Parish of Cerklje na Gorenjskem. It was first mentioned in sources from 1485, and the current building dates from 1755. The main altar was created by Jurij Tavčar (1820–1892) and features a 1755 painting by Valentin Metzinger (1699–1759).

== Notable people ==
Notable people that were born or lived in Dvorje include:

- Davorin Jenko (1835–1914), composer
- Josip Jenko (1854–1932), technical writer and historian
- Aleš Zorman (1778–1865), merchant and educational philanthropist
