= Kanikkaran =

Semi-nomadic community in southern India

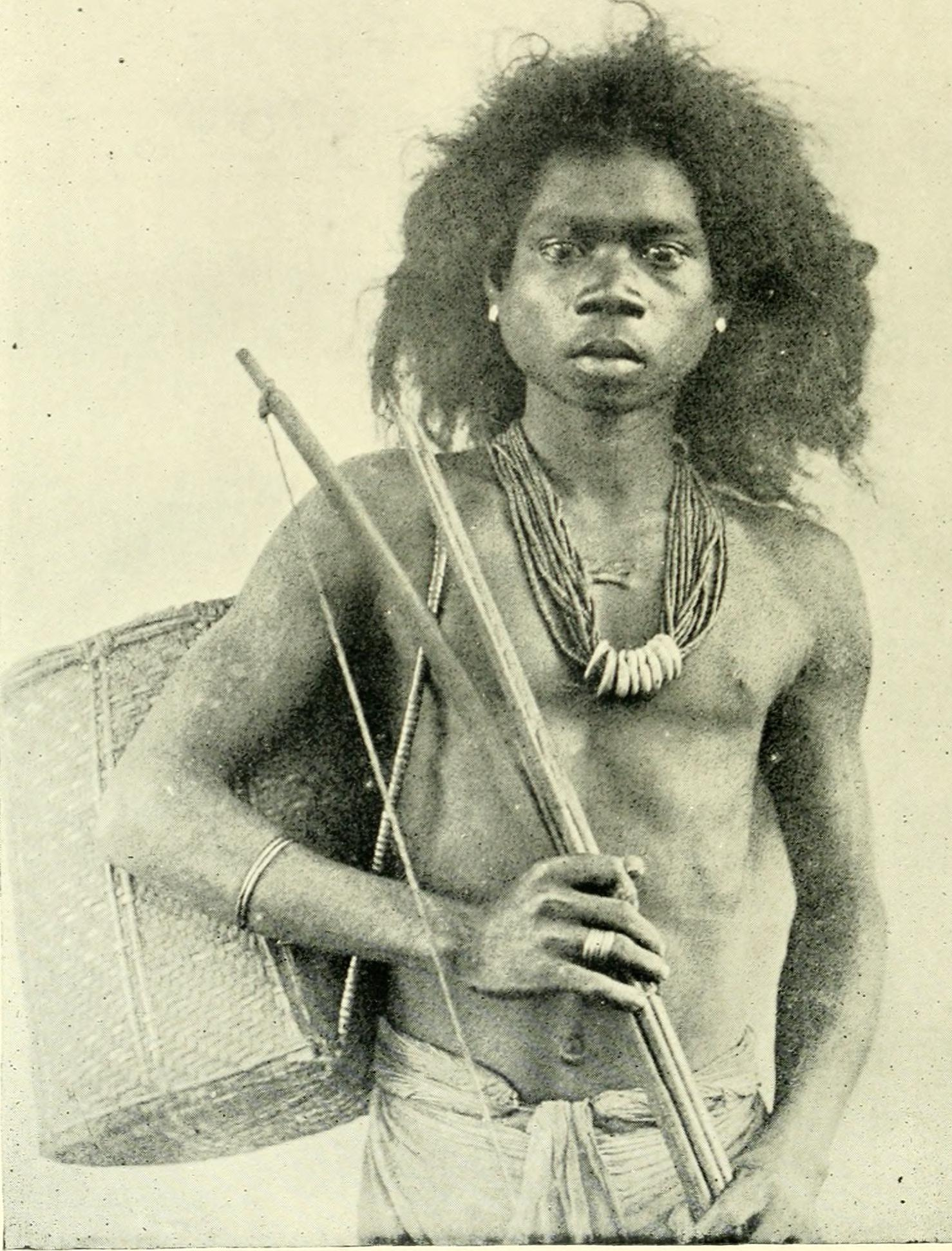
- Kanikkar tribal, Travancore, 1905

Total population
- 25,088 (2011 census)

Regions with significant populations
- India
- Kerala: 21,251
- Tamil Nadu: 3,837

Languages
- Kanikkaran, Tamil, Malayalam

Religion
- Folk Hinduism

Kanikkaran are a tribal community found in the southern parts of Kerala and Tamil Nadu states in India. According to 2011 census there are 24,000 Kanikkars, living in several districts of Kerala and Tamil Nadu. They dwell in forests or near to forests in Thiruvananthapuram and Kollam in Kerala, and Kanyakumari and Tirunelveli districts in Tamil Nadu.

Though they cultivate everything and make agriculture as the main profession, they have a special liking for fishing and hunting. Literacy is estimated to be around 53.84%. Kaanikkar Nritham is a form of group dance performed as a rural offering. Kokra is a traditional musical instrument used by them.

== Language ==
The Kanikkaran language is closely related to Tamil, but has significant Malayalam influence.

== See also ==
- Amboori Village
