= Kokra (settlement) =

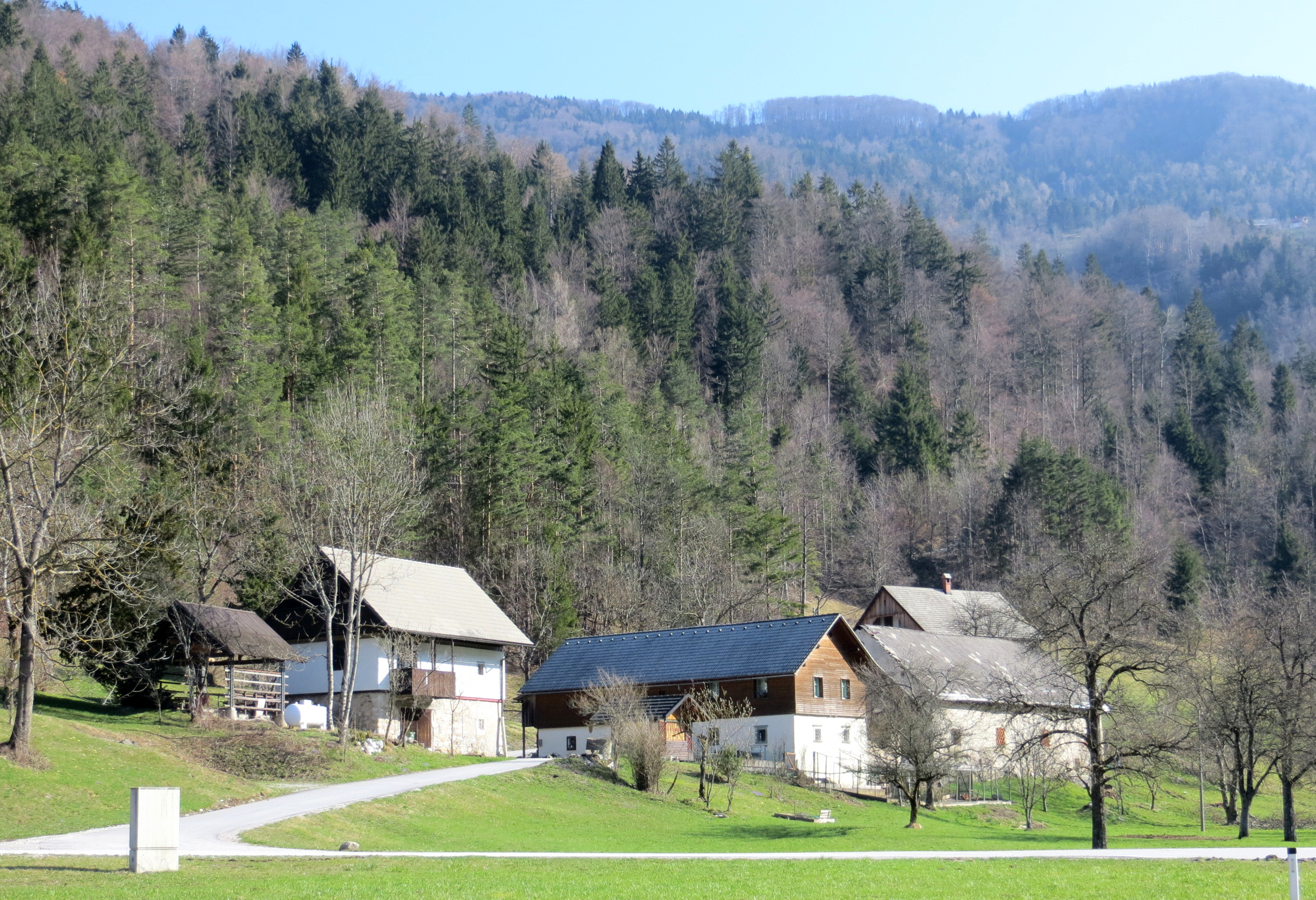

- Location in Slovenia
- Coordinates: 46°20′13.51″N 14°30′41.24″E
- Country: Slovenia
- Traditional region: Upper Carniola
- Statistical region: Upper Carniola
- Municipality: Preddvor

Area
  - Total: 52.74 km^{2} (20.36 sq mi)
- Elevation: 898.9 m (2,949 ft)

Population (2002)
  - Total: 266

Kokra (pronounced [ˈkoːkɾa]; German: Kanker) is a settlement scattered along a 10-kilometer (6.2 mi) stretch of the road from Kranj to Jezersko Peak in the Kokra Valley in the Municipality of Preddvor in the Upper Carniola region of Slovenia.

== Church ==
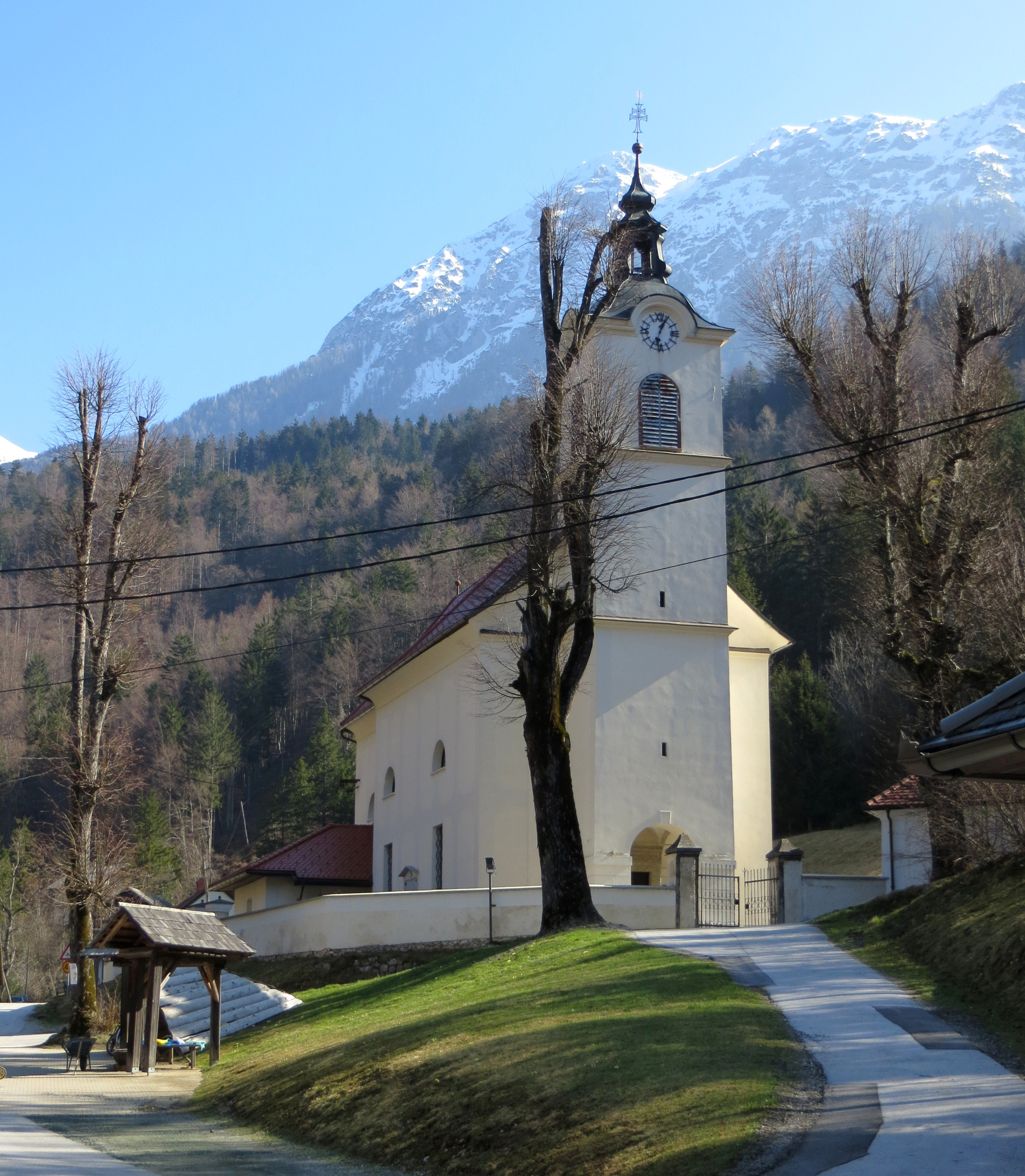
Immaculate Conception Church

The parish church in the settlement is dedicated to the Immaculate Conception. It was completed in 1797 and dedicated in 1802.

== Other cultural heritage ==
There is also a monument to the local victims of the Second World War in the settlement.
