= Možjanca =

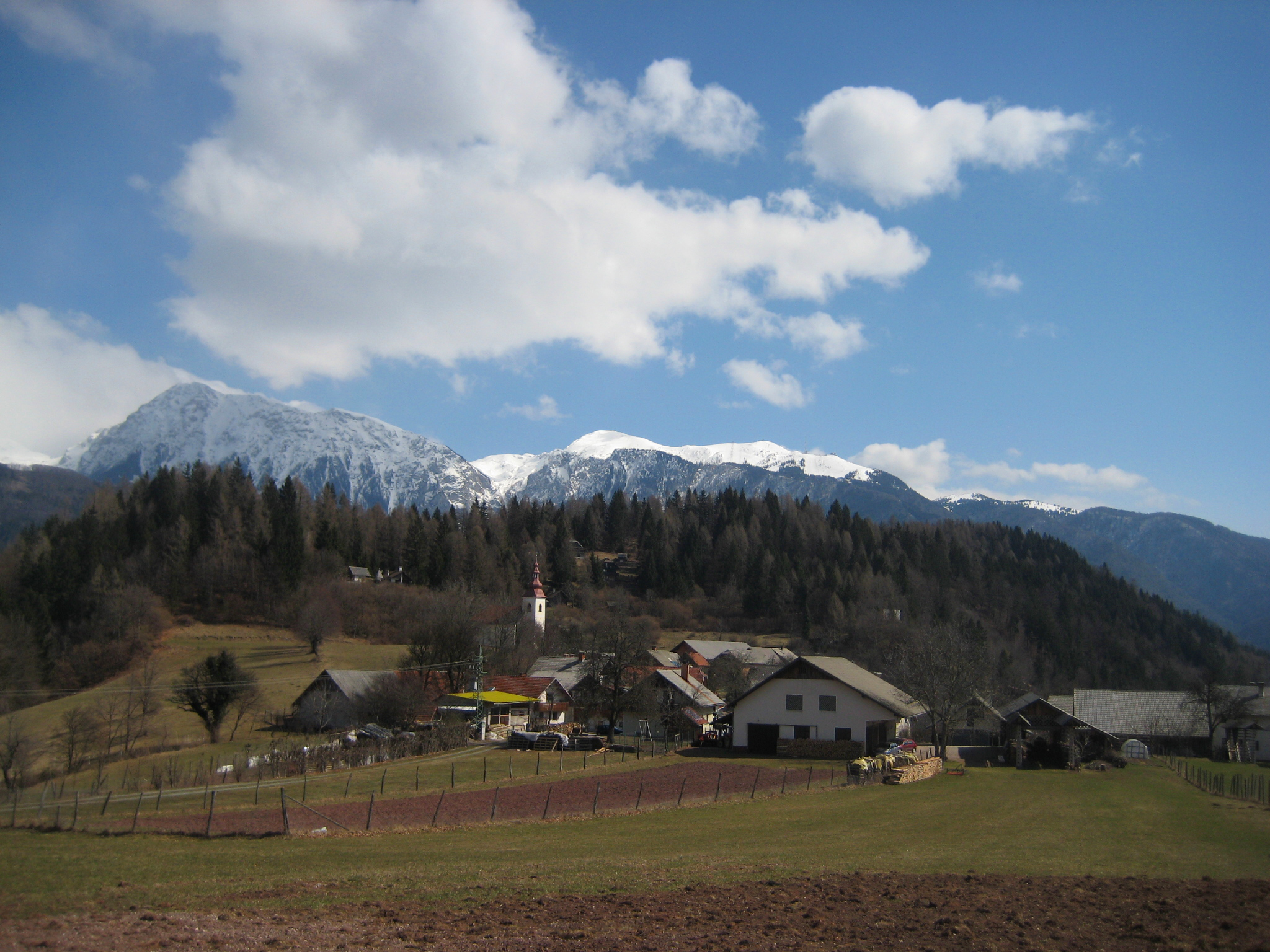

- Location in Slovenia
- Coordinates: 46°17′39.62″N 14°26′58.32″E
- Country: Slovenia
- Traditional region: Upper Carniola
- Statistical region: Upper Carniola
- Municipality: Preddvor

Area
  - Total: 1.89 km^{2} (0.73 sq mi)
- Elevation: 679.1 m (2,228 ft)

Population (2002)
  - Total: 42

Možjanca (pronounced [mɔˈʒjaːntsa]; in older sources also Možanca, German: Moisesberg) is a small settlement in the Municipality of Preddvor in the Upper Carniola region of Slovenia.

== Church ==
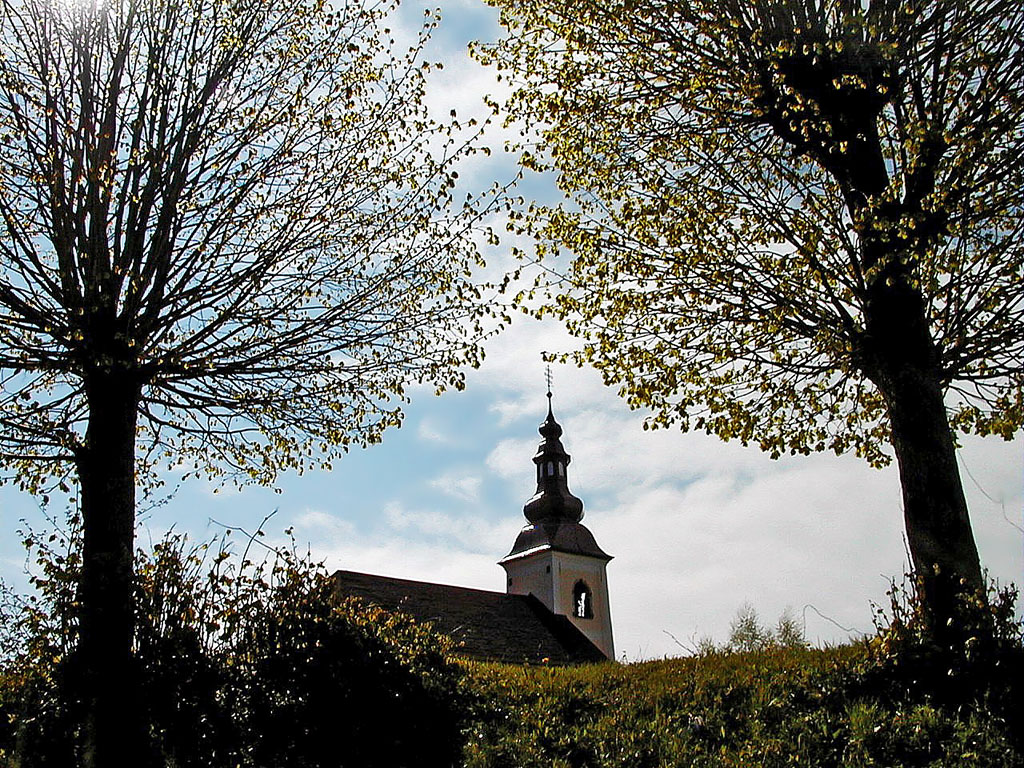
Saint Nicholas's Church

The local church is dedicated to Saint Nicholas. It was built in 1871 at the location of an earlier church.
