= Mače, Preddvor =

Mače
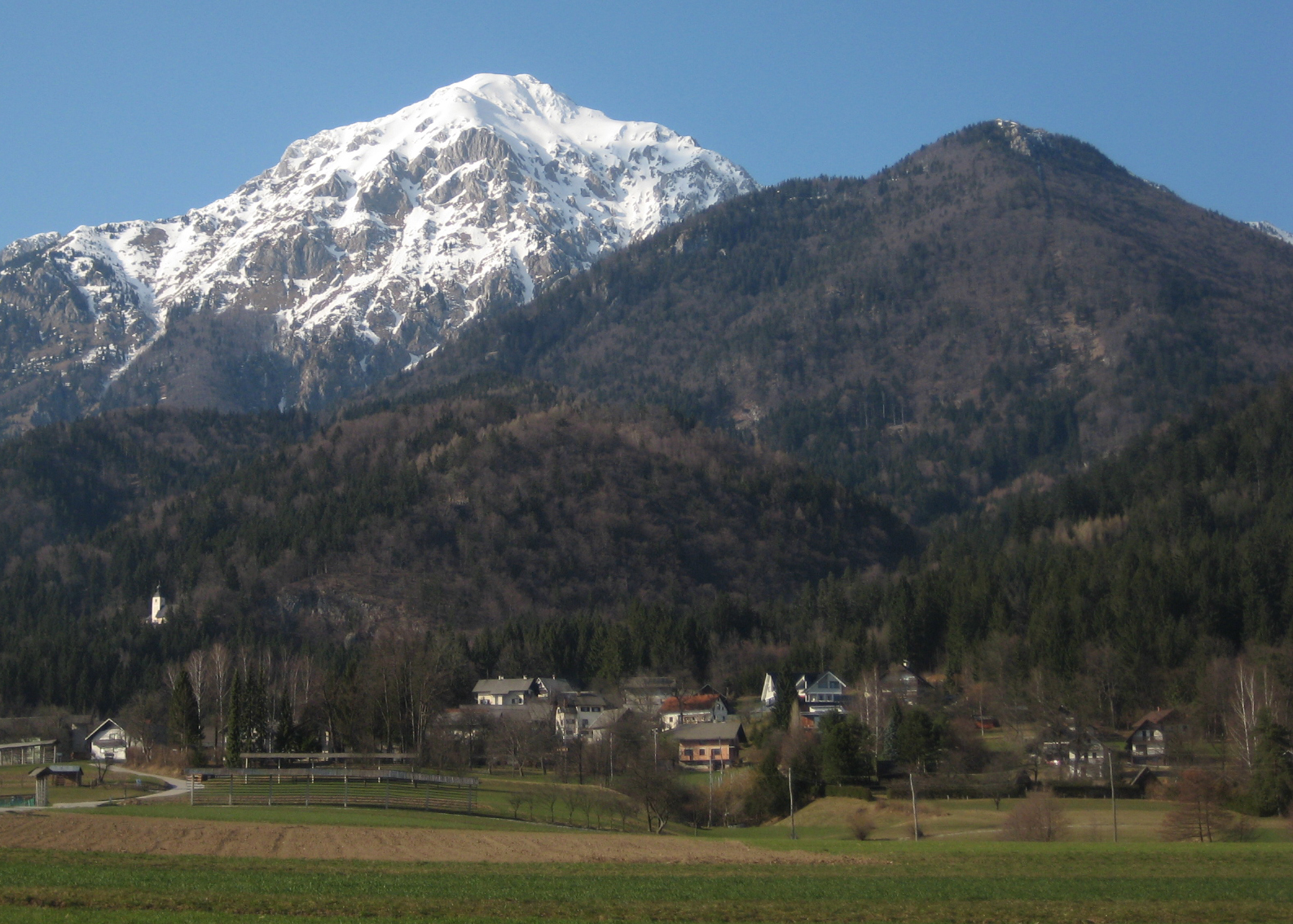

- Location in Slovenia
- Coordinates: 46°18′42.5″N 14°24′57.09″E
- Country: Slovenia
- Traditional region: Upper Carniola
- Statistical region: Upper Carniola
- Municipality: Preddvor

Area
  - Total: 9.18 km^{2} (3.54 sq mi)
- Elevation: 551.2 m (1,808 ft)

Population (2002)
  - Total: 116

Mače (pronounced [ˈmaːtʃɛ]; German: Katzendorf) is a small village in the Municipality of Preddvor in the Upper Carniola region of Slovenia.

== Geography ==
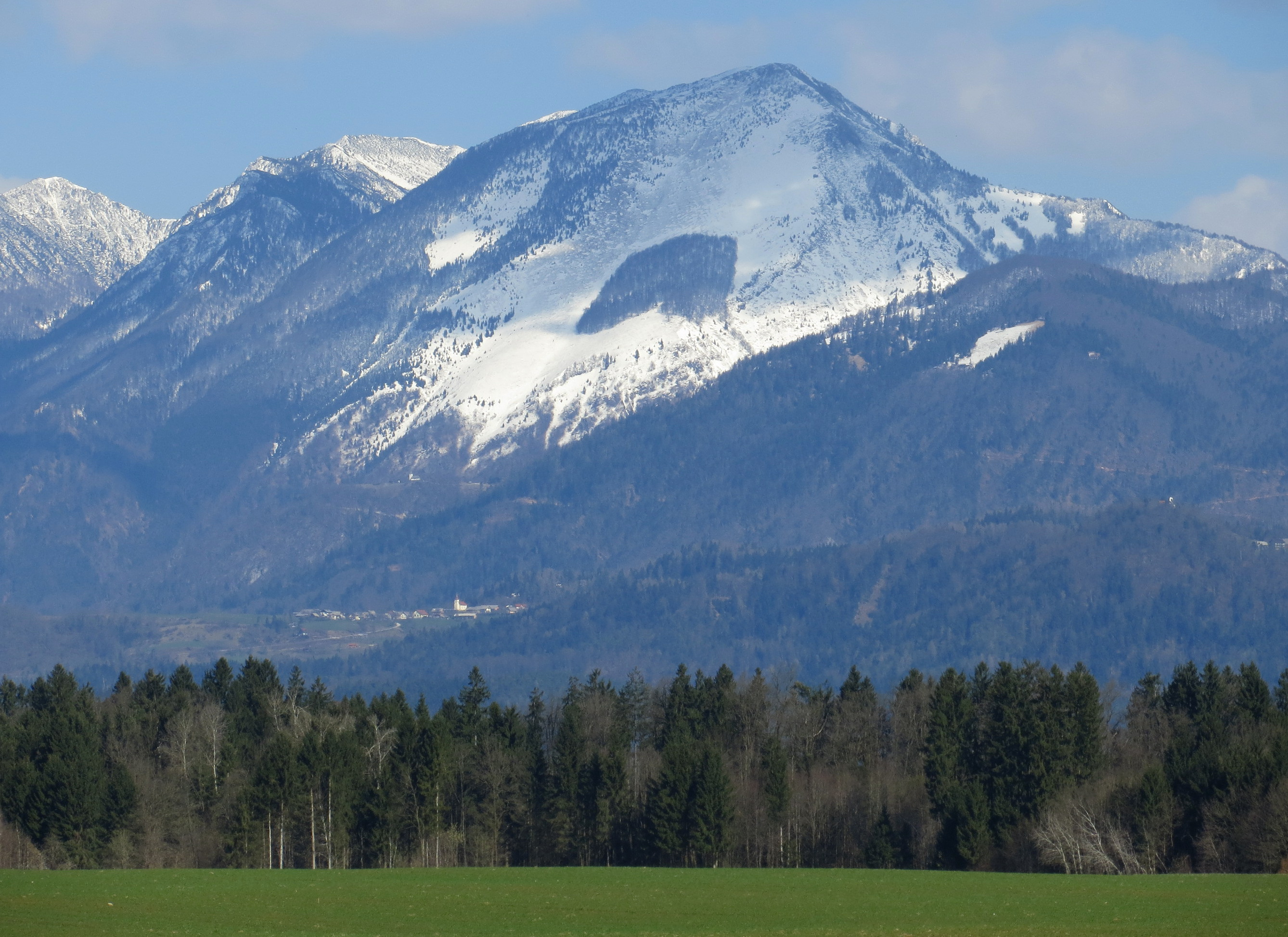
The Devil's Forest

Mače stands on a ridge between the valleys of Dry Creek (Slovene: Suha) and Bistrica Creek. The territory of Mače includes an isolated patch of forest below Middle Peak (Slovene: Srednji vrh, 1,853 meters or 6,079 feet) known as the Devil's Forest (Slovene: Hudičev boršt).

== History ==
During the Second World War, the Partisans abducted Rado Hribar and Ksenija Gorjup Hribar, the owners of Strmol Castle in Dvorje, and murdered them at Mače. The bodies were found above Mače in 2015.

== Church ==
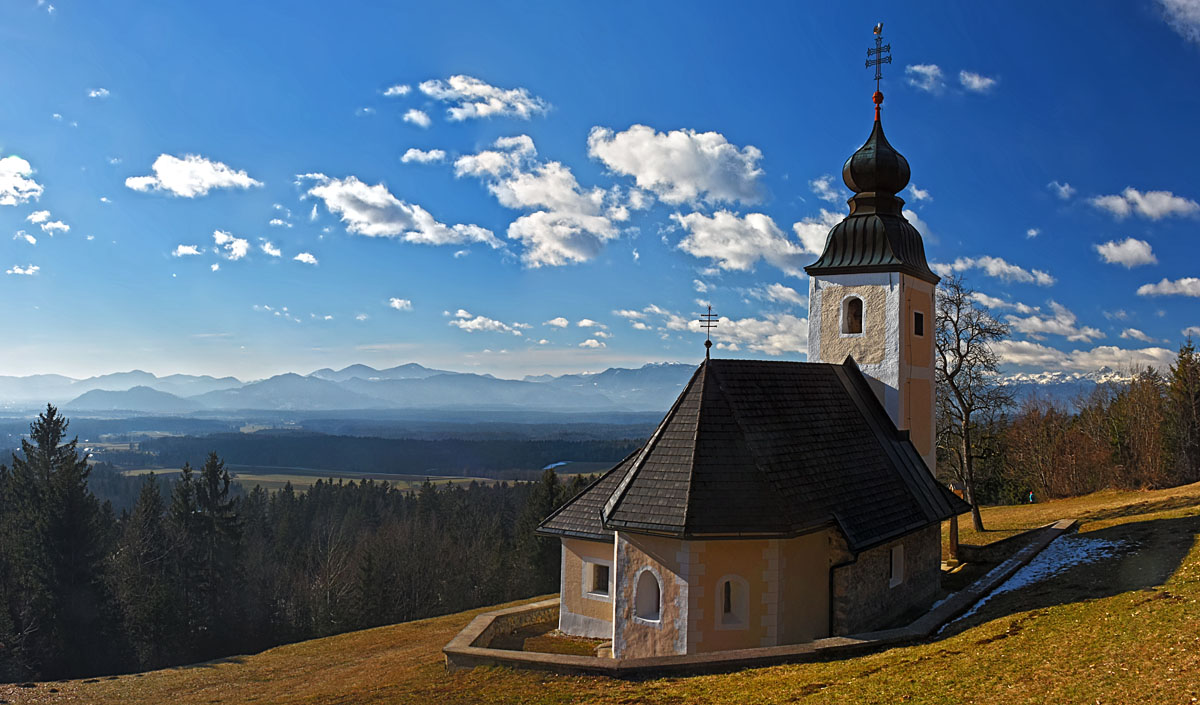
View from the northeast

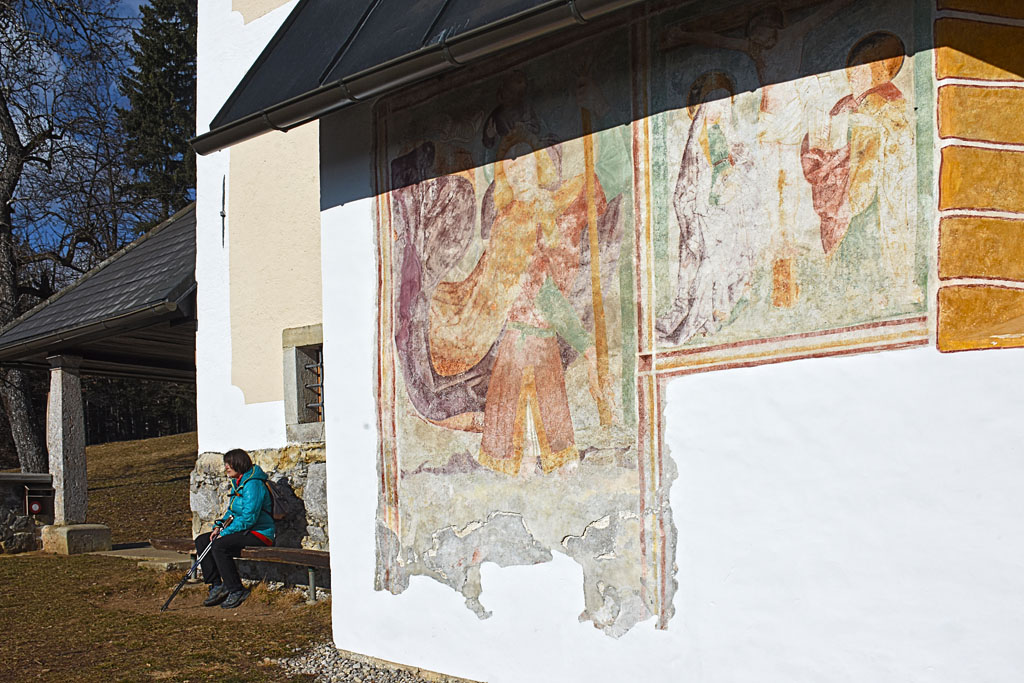
Exterior fresco

Saint Nicholas's Church

The local church, built on a hill above the settlement, is dedicated to Saint Nicholas. It was first mentioned in documents dating to 1156. The surviving church is a Gothic building from the late 14th or early 15th century. The original vaulted sanctuary survives. The painted wooden ceiling of the nave is from 1649 and was renovated in 1996. Frescos on the north side of the nave depict the journey of the Magi and on the central arch the legend of Saint Ursula. On the south wall Saint Christopher and the Crucifixion of Jesus are shown, with the date 1467.
