= Strmol Castle =

Coordinates: 46°15′53.04″N 14°28′44.59″E

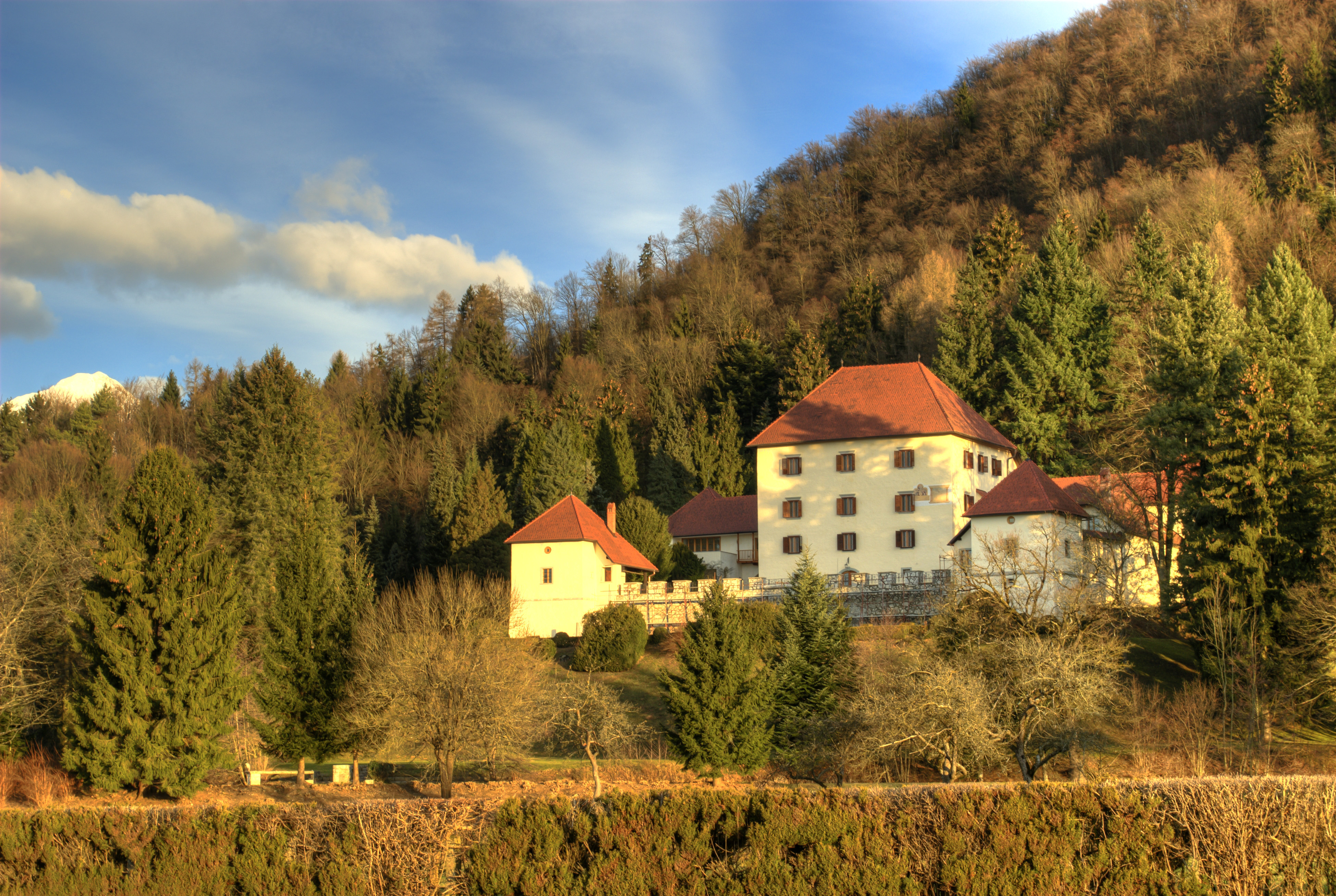
Strmol Castle

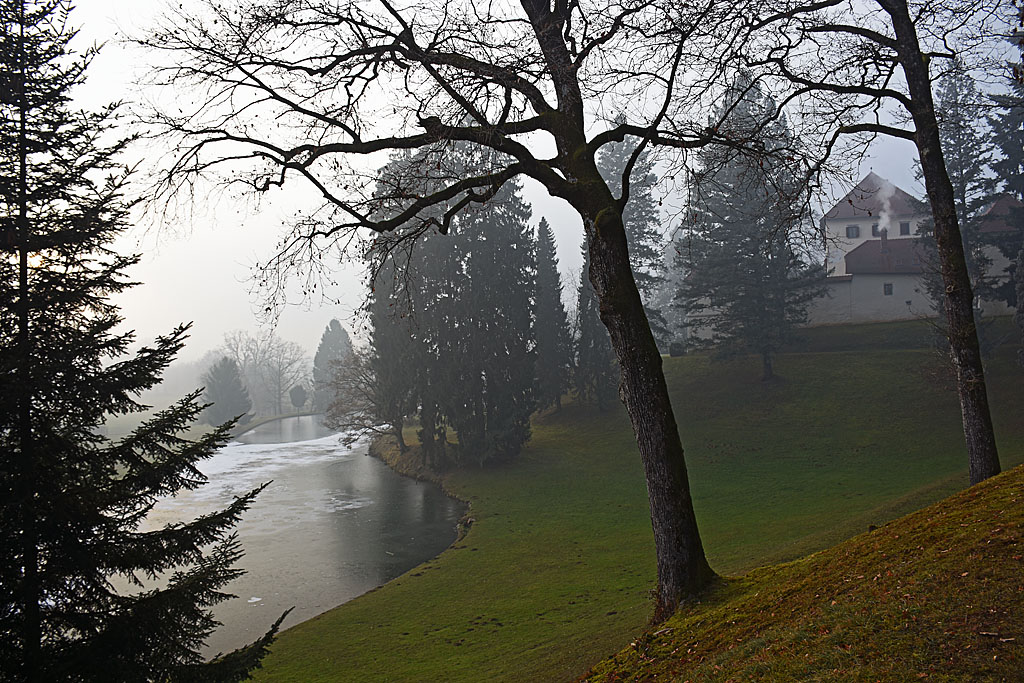
The castle park

Strmol Castle (German: Burg Stermol, Slovene: grad Strmol) is a castle located at the foot of Dvorjanski hrib ("Mansion Hill") near the villages of Češnjevek, Grad and Dvorje, in the Municipality of Cerklje na Gorenjskem, Slovenia. Named after its builders, the Strmol family, it is notable as one of the few castles in Slovenia to retain a Slovene name throughout its history. It is currently a guesthouse and conference site for the government of the Republic of Slovenia.

== History ==
Of the twelve medieval manors in the area of the modern Municipality of Cerklje na Gorenjskem, Strmol Castle is the only one that has survived intact to the present. The castle is first mentioned in the 13th century, though there are no reliable records of its founding. The structure is centered on a towering keep with a late medieval core, taking its present form after renaissance and baroque renovations. The central keep is surrounded by a low, rectangular renaissance defensive wall, fortified with square corner turrets, which once featured a drawbridge over a moat. The interiors are richly furnished with historic furniture and art.

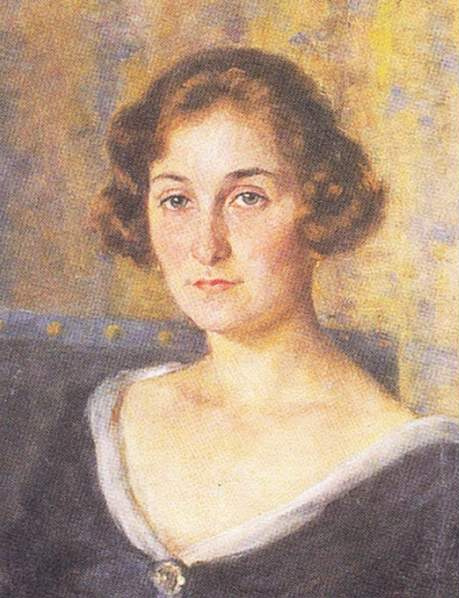
Portrait of Ksenija Gorup Hribar (1923) by Ivana Kobilca

In January 1944, the Partisans abducted and murdered the owners of the castle, Rado Hribar (1901–1944) and Ksenija Gorjup Hribar (1905–1944), in the forest at Mače. The castle was confiscated by the communist government after the war. A demand for restitution of the property was lodged in 1992 and the castle was returned to the heirs in 2004. The bodies of Rado Hribar and Ksenija Gorjup Hribar were found in December 2015 above the village of Mače.

== Castle park ==
The castle is surrounded by a park, established in the late 17th century. It originally encompassed an orchard on the slope below the castle, and four fishponds on the plain below that, with a walking path with benches leading from the castle. The layout has not significantly changed, though only one of the ponds remains. The current arrangement includes an access path, which ascends the slope toward a square walled courtyard behind the castle. The wall is decorated with baroque female figures and puttos by Angelo PuttaPozzi, originally from the garden of the defunct Zalog (Wartenberg) manor by Moravče, but relocated here in the 1960s along with his Atlas statues at the northern entrance steps. On the opposite side of the courtyard, the path descends toward a nearby road. Between the access paths there is an informal park, with an artificial lake and non-native trees.

== Sources ==
- Inventory of Significant Natural Heritage of Slovenia, Agency for Protection of Natural and Cultural Heritage of SR Slovenia, Ljubljana 1988 ("Inventar najpomembnejše naravne dediščine Slovenije, Zavod SR Slovenije za varstvo naravne in kulturne dediščine, Ljubljana 1988")
