= Srednja Bela =

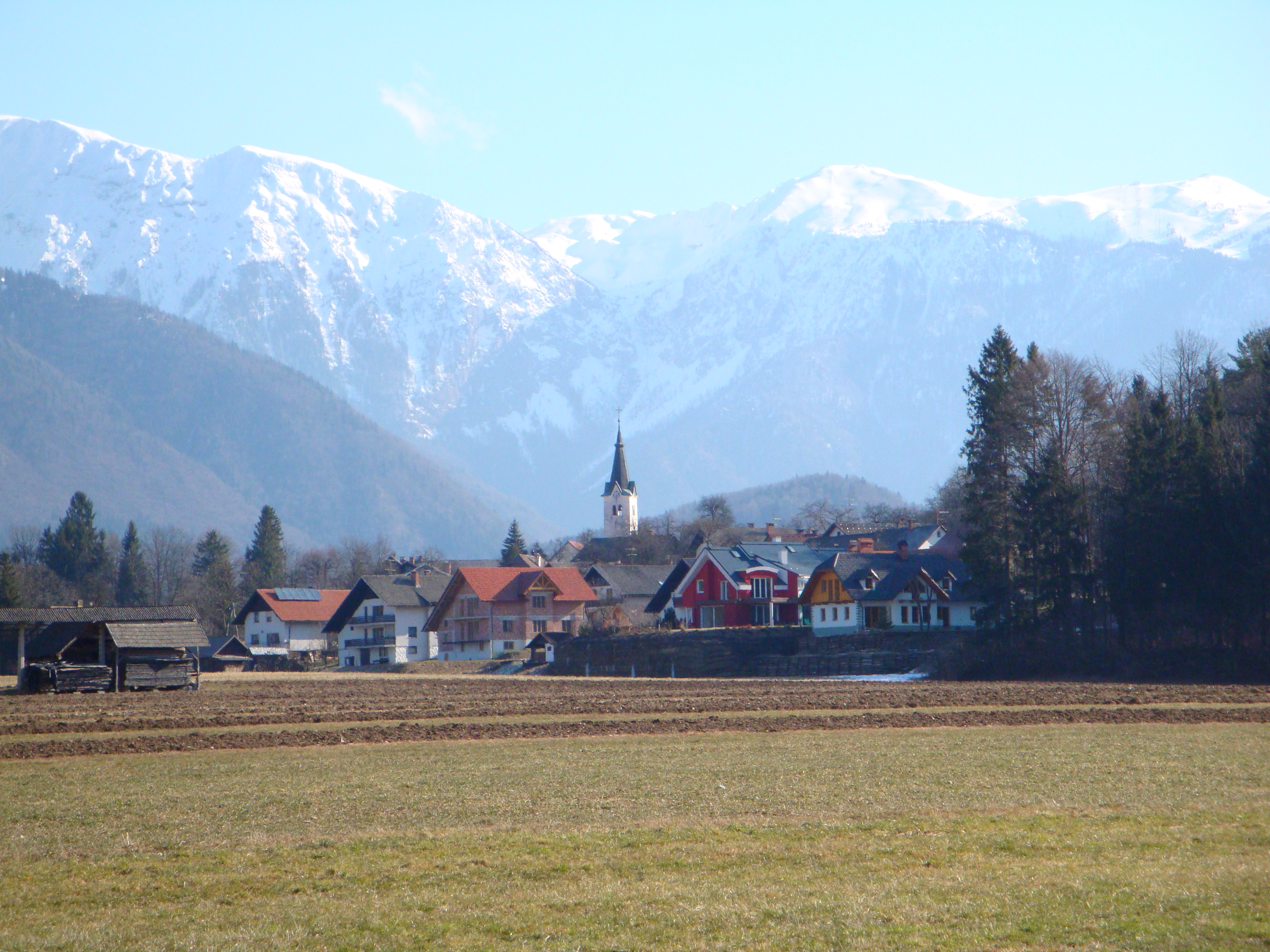

- Location in Slovenia
- Coordinates: 46°17′35.41″N 14°23′46.31″E
- Country: Slovenia
- Traditional region: Upper Carniola
- Statistical region: Upper Carniola
- Municipality: Preddvor

Area
  - Total: 1.02 km^{2} (0.39 sq mi)
- Elevation: 476.9 m (1,565 ft)

Population (2002)
  - Total: 267

Srednja Bela (pronounced [ˈsɾeːdnja ˈbeːla]; German: Mittervellach) is a village in the Municipality of Preddvor in the Upper Carniola region of Slovenia.

== Church ==
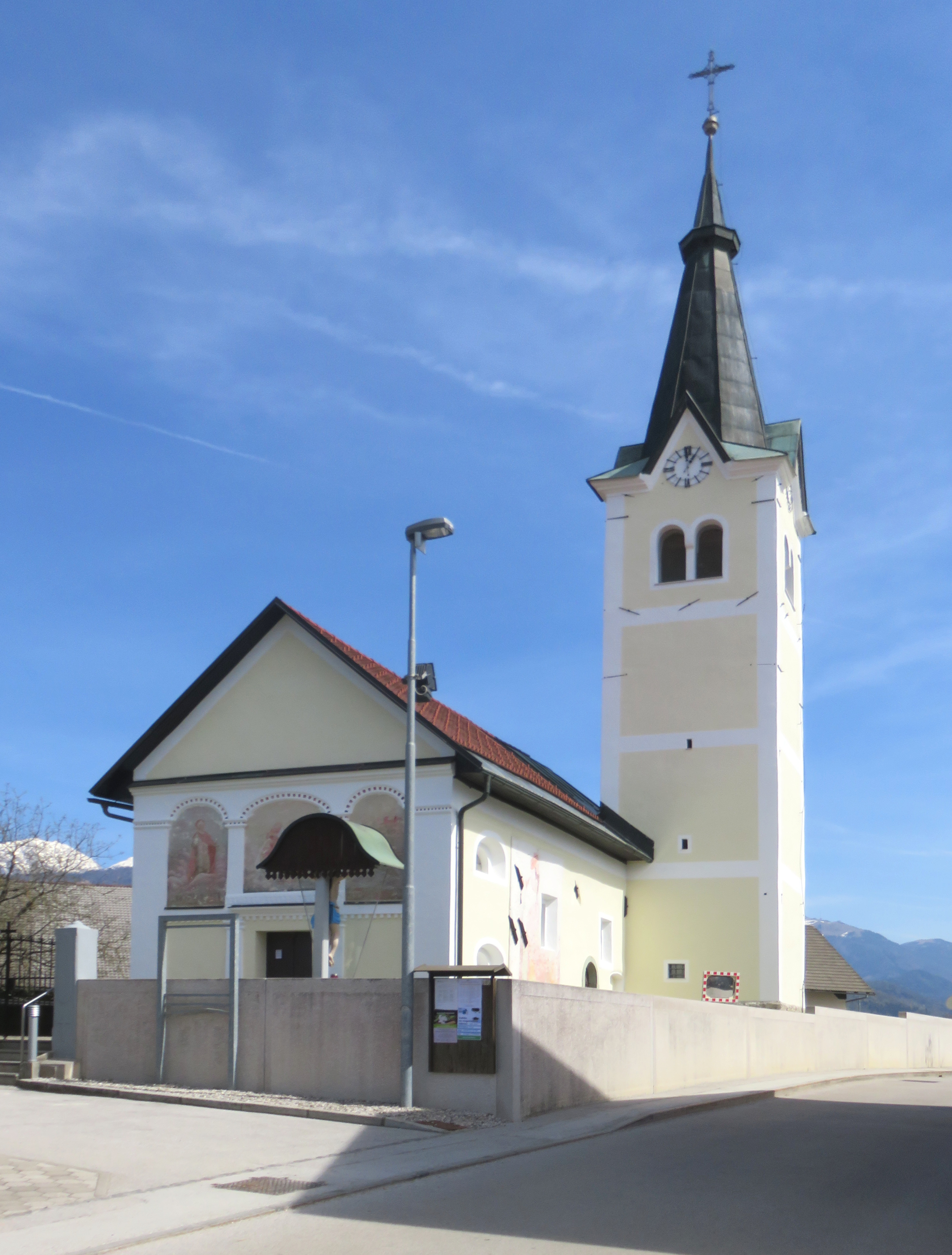
Saint Giles's Church

The local church in the settlement is dedicated to Saint Giles.
