= Municipality of Preddvor =

Municipality of Slovenia

Municipality of Preddvor Občina Preddvor
- Municipality
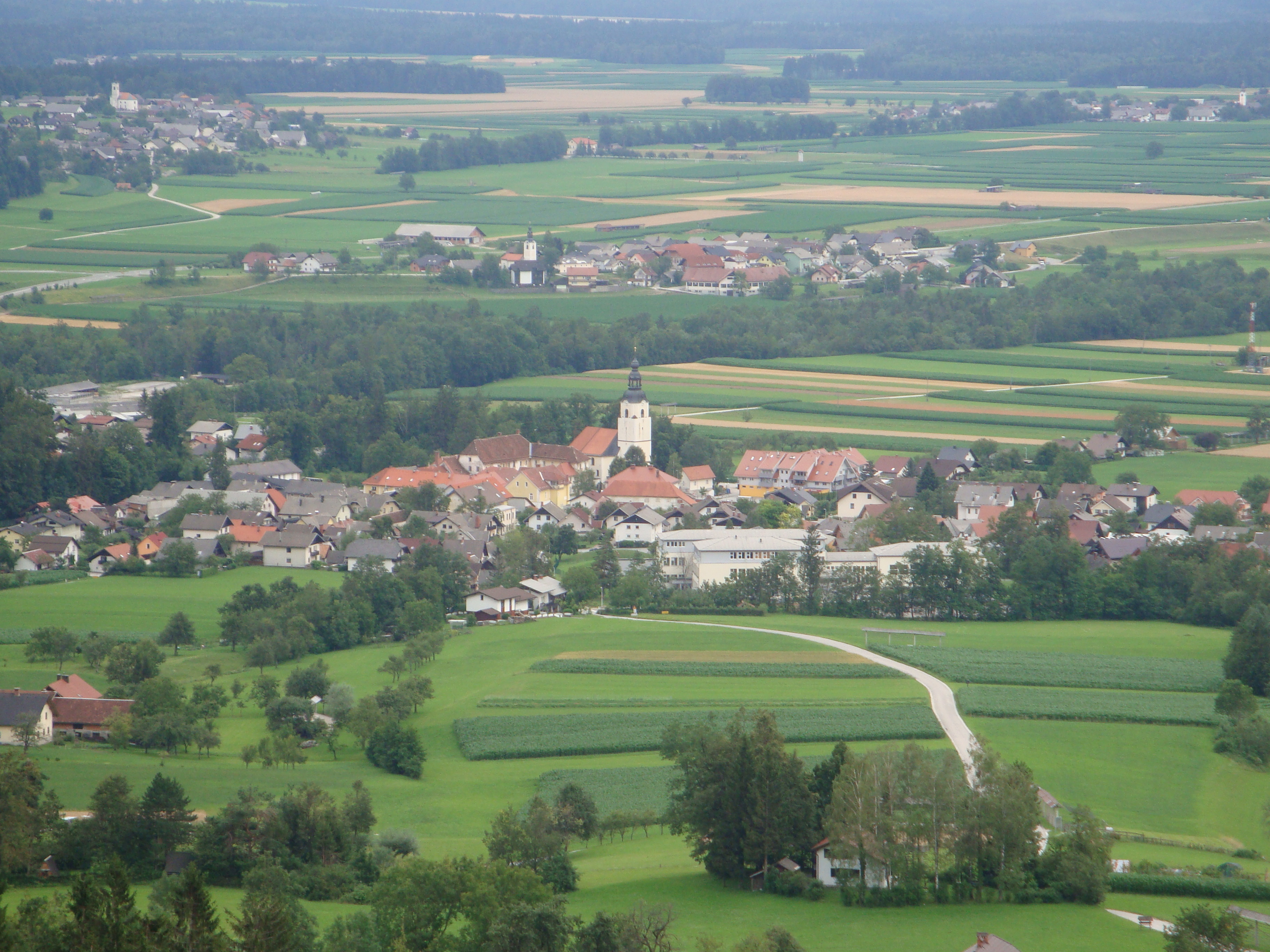

- Location of the Municipality of Preddvor in Slovenia
- Coordinates: 46°18′N 14°25′E
- Country: Slovenia

Government
  - Mayor: Rok Roblek (Democrats)

Area
  - Total: 87.0 km^{2} (33.6 sq mi)

Population (July 1, 2018)
  - Total: 3,659
  - Density: 42.1/km^{2} (109/sq mi)
- Time zone: UTC+01 (CET)
  - Summer (DST): UTC+02 (CEST)
- Website: www.preddvor.si

The Municipality of Preddvor (pronounced [pɾɛˈdʋɔɾ]; Slovene: Občina Preddvor) is a municipality in Slovenia. The seat of the municipality is the town of Preddvor. The municipality was established on 3 October 1994, when the former larger Municipality of Kranj was subdivided into the municipalities of Cerklje na Gorenjskem, Kranj, Naklo, Preddvor, and Šenčur. The municipality was reduced in size on 7 August 1998 by the creation of the Municipality of Jezersko from its territory.

== Settlements ==
In addition to the municipal seat of Preddvor, the municipality also includes the following settlements:

- Bašelj
- Breg ob Kokri
- Hraše pri Preddvoru
- Hrib
- Kokra
- Mače
- Možjanca
- Nova Vas
- Potoče
- Spodnja Bela
- Srednja Bela
- Tupaliče
- Zgornja Bela
