= Kokra (instrument) =

Kokra is a musical instrument used by the Kanikkar tribal community of Kerala in India.

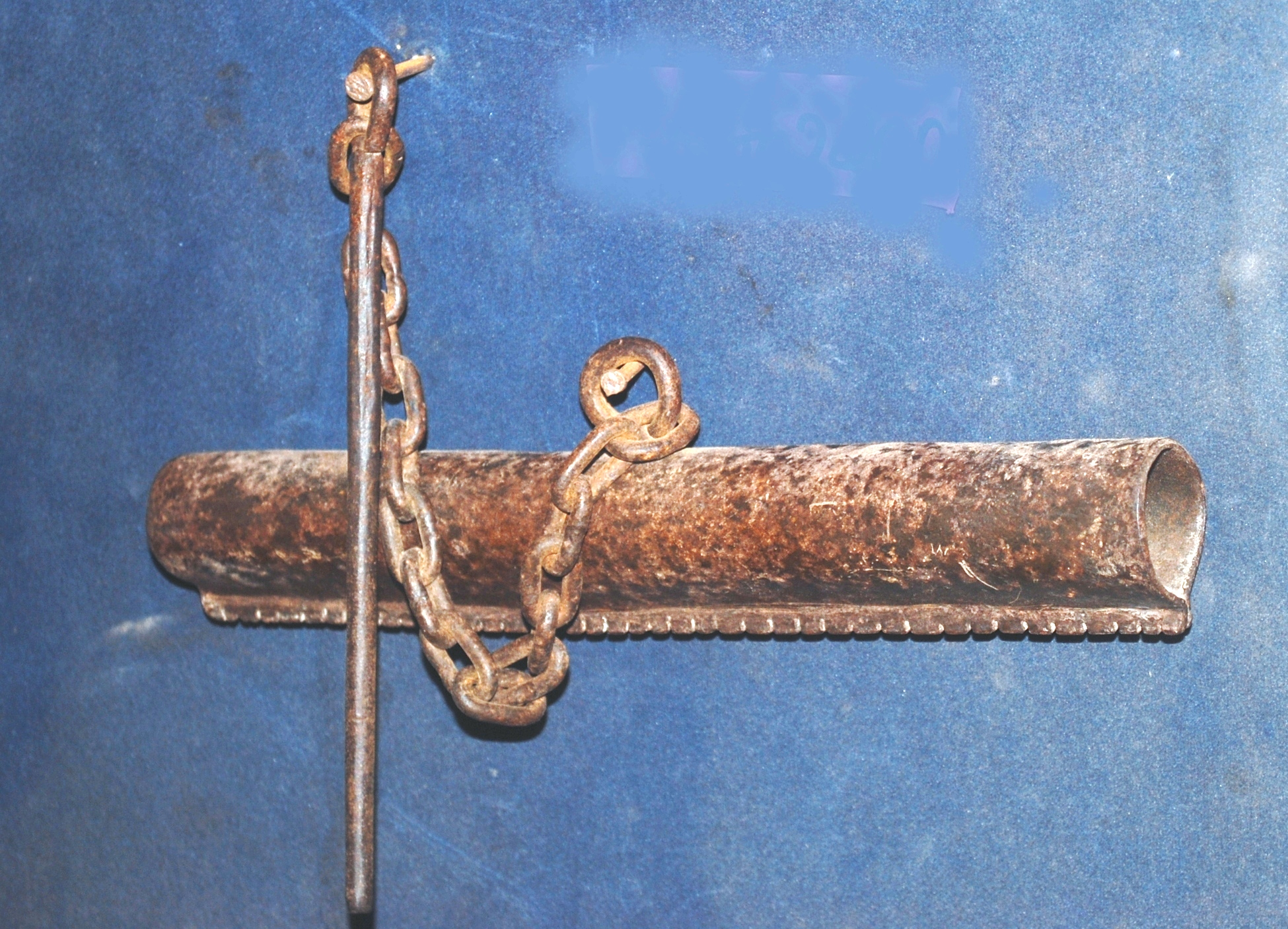

The upper half of the instrument is shaped like the comb on a rooster's head, hence the name. It consists of a hollow iron tube with teeth and an iron rod connected to the body by a chain.
