= Reka (Pšata) =

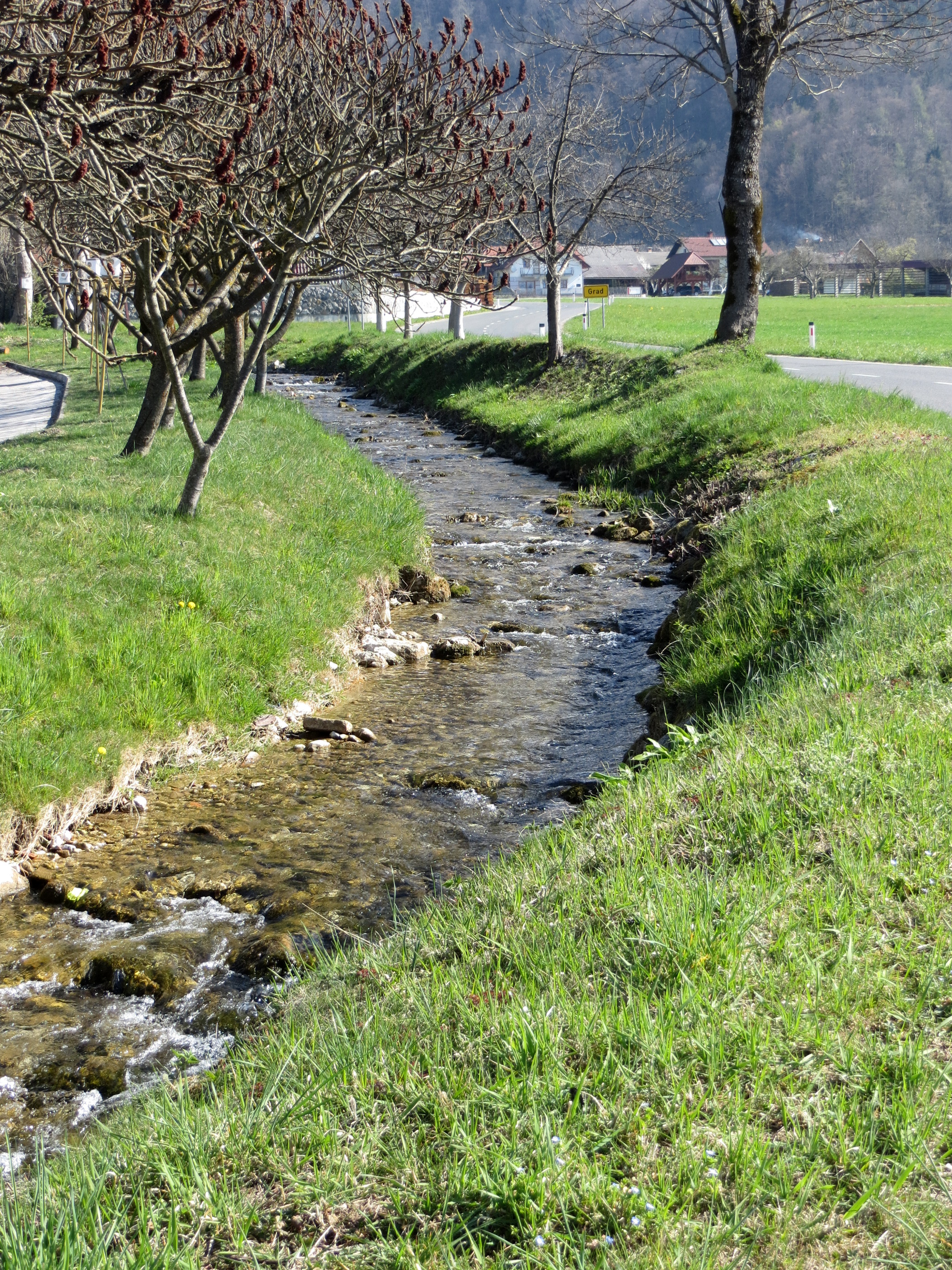
- Reka in Dvorje

Location
- Country: Slovenia

Physical characteristics
- Source
  - location: East of Štefanja Gora in the Kamnik–Savinja Alps
- Mouth
  - location: Pšata in Komenda
  - coordinates: 46.2043°N 14.5415°E

Basin features
- Progression: Pšata→ Kamnik Bistrica→ Sava→ Danube→ Black Sea

Reka (also known as Brnik Creek) is a right tributary of the Pšata River in Slovenia. It is formed by the confluence of two smaller creeks flowing from the Luknja Gorge (Slovene: Lukenjski graben) and Brezovec Gorge (Slovene: Brezovški graben) below Mount Krvavec. It flows south through Cerklje na Gorenjskem. South of that, it is joined by a right tributary, Ušica Creek, before it joins the Pšata River at Komenda.
