= Kanikkaran language =

Dravidian language of India

Kanikkaran
- கணிக்காரன்/കണ്ണിക്കാരൻ
- Native to: India
- Region: Tamil Nadu, Kanyakumari
- Ethnicity: Kanikkaran
- Native speakers: 19,000 (2007)
- Language family: Dravidian: Southern; Southern I; Tamil–Kannada; Tamil–Kota; Tamil–Toda; Tamil–Irula; Tamil–Kodava–Urali; Tamil–Malayalam; Malayalamoid; Kanikkaran
- Early forms: Old Tamil: Middle Tamil
- Writing system: Tamil script, Malayalam script

Language codes
- ISO 639-3: kev
- Glottolog: kani1275

Kanikkaran (IPA: [kaːɳikːaːrɐn]), also known as Kani, is a Dravidian language spoken by about 19,000 Kanikkar tribals in southern India. They dwell in forests and hills of Thiruvananthapuram and Kollam districts of Kerala, and Kanyakumari and Tirunelveli districts of Tamil Nadu. It is called malambhāsha, or "hill-language."

== Phonology ==
=== Vowels ===
Kanikkaran has 5 vowels, /a, e, i, o, u/. It demonstrates contrastive vowel length.

=== Consonants ===
		Labial	Dental	Alveolar	Retroflex	Palatal	Velar
Nasal		m	n̪	n	ɳ	ɲ	ŋ
Stop	voiceless	p	t̪		ʈ	c	k
Stop	voiced	b	d̪				
Approximant		ʋ		l	ɭ	j	
Trill				r			
Flap				ɾ			

They use the phoneme /l̩/ occasionally.

Kanikkaran has transformed words in Malayalam starting with /a/ into /e/. añcu (5) becomes eñcu, ari (rice) becomes ei, arivāḷu (sickle) becomes erivāḷu, aluku (split reed) becomes elakku. It also adds a suffix -in or -n after all noun stems, except for nouns ending with -n in accusative.

== Grammar ==
	singular	plural
1st	ñān	ñāṇkaḷu
2nd	īl	nīṇkaḷu
3rd	avanu/avaḷu	avaru

The language cannot use personal terminations, similar to Old Malayalam. Example: pōvā (go or going or let's go) and vārā (will come, or "see you").
