= Kokra =

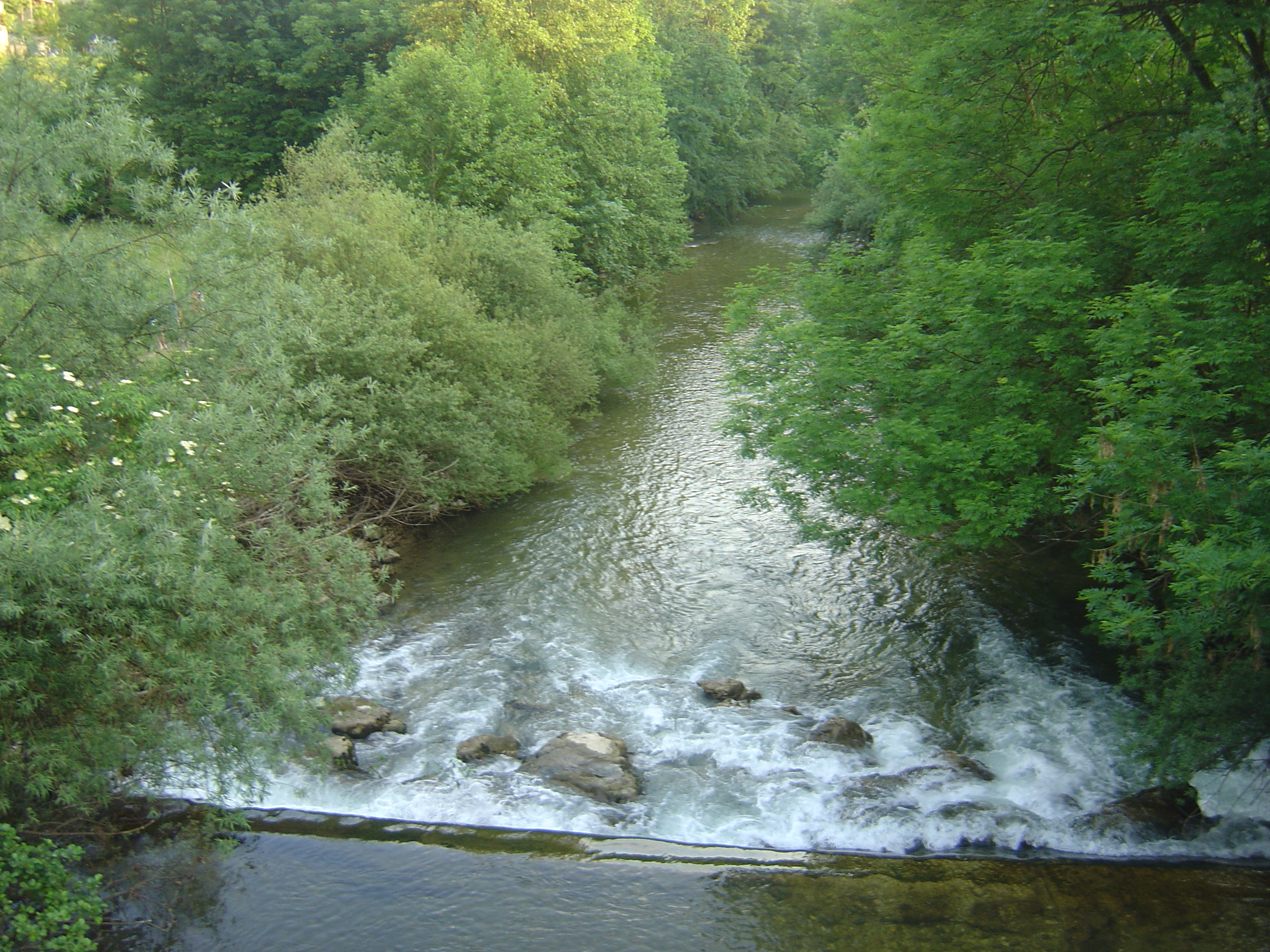
- The Kokra Canyon in Kranj

Location
- Country: Slovenia

Physical characteristics
- Source
  - location: West of Spodnje Jezersko, Karawanks
  - elevation: 1,300 m (4,300 ft)
- Mouth
  - location: Sava in Kranj
  - coordinates: 46.2339°N 14.3562°E
- Length: 34 km (21 mi)
- Basin size: 221 km^{2} (85 sq mi)

Basin features
- Progression: Sava→ Danube→ Black Sea

The Kokra (pronounced [ˈkoːkɾa]) is a river of Slovenia. Originating in the Karawanks, the river is 34 km (21 mi) long. It flows into the Sava in Kranj.

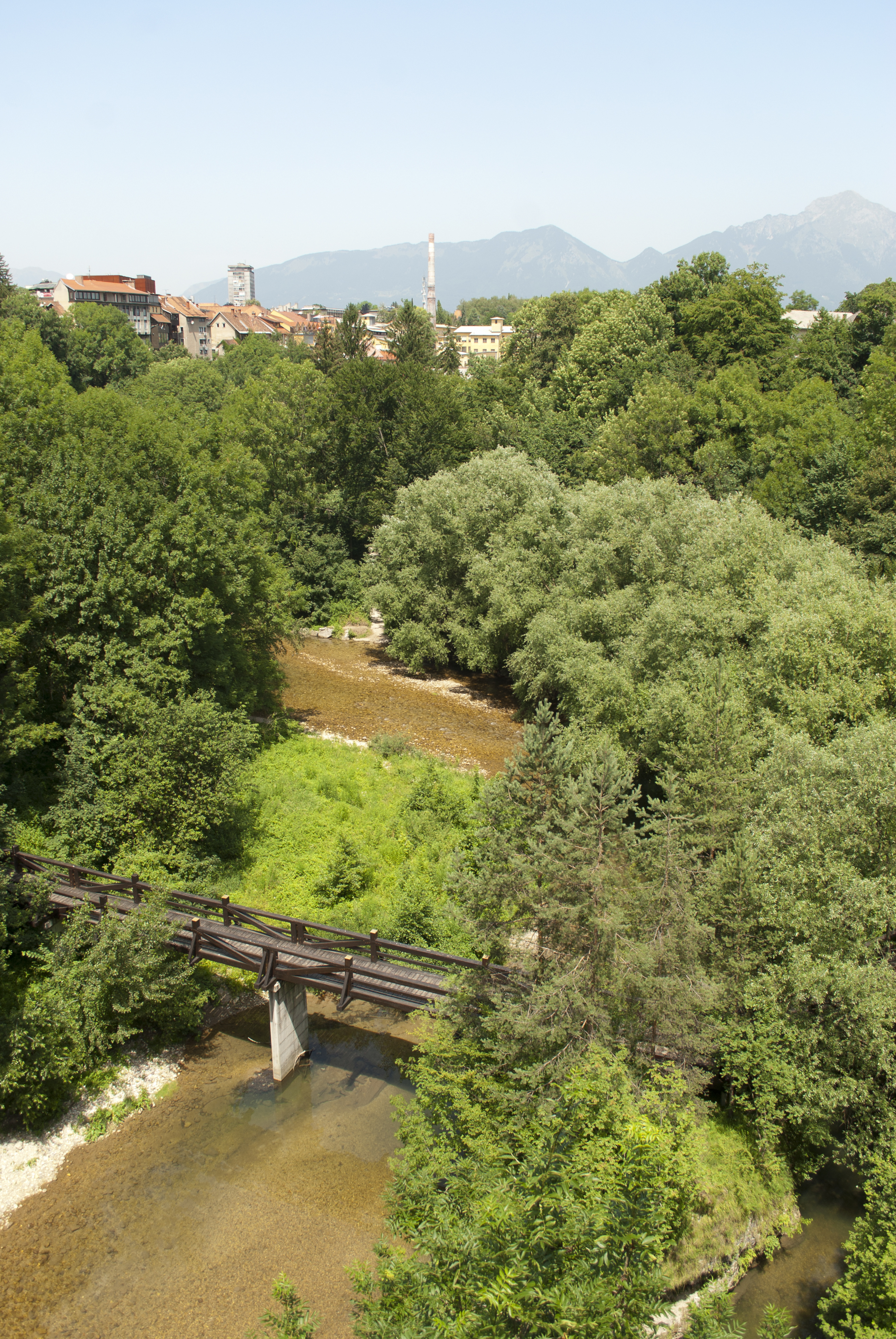
The Kokra Canyon in Kranj
