= Preddvor =

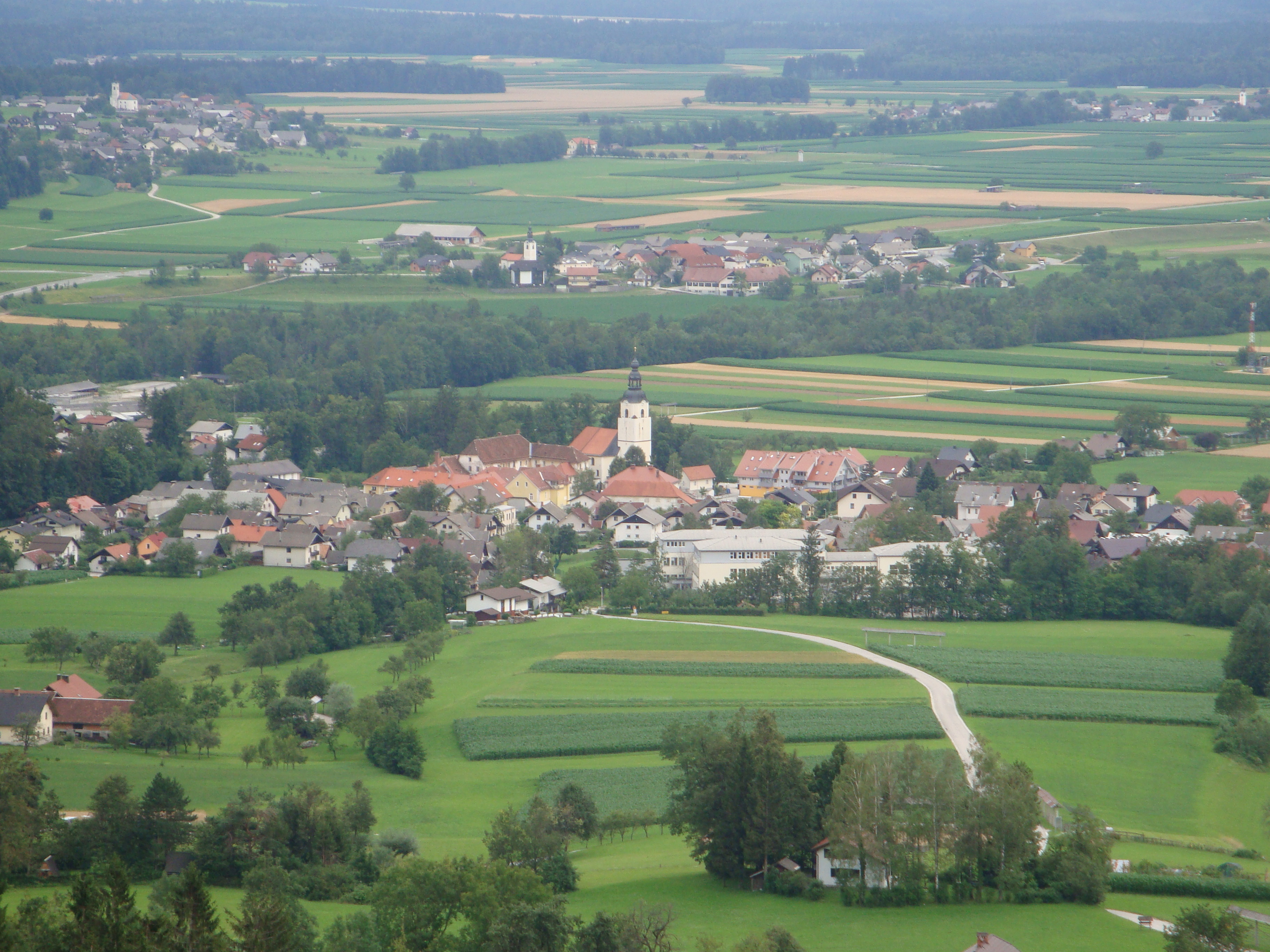
- Panorama of Preddvor

- Location in Slovenia
- Coordinates: 46°18′18.62″N 14°25′13.24″E
- Country: Slovenia
- Traditional region: Upper Carniola
- Statistical region: Upper Carniola
- Municipality: Preddvor

Area
  - Total: 6.43 km^{2} (2.48 sq mi)
- Elevation: 494.4 m (1,622 ft)

Population (2012)
  - Total: 835

Preddvor (pronounced [pɾɛˈdʋɔɾ]; German: Höflein) is a settlement in Slovenia. It is the seat of the Municipality of Preddvor.

== Name ==
The settlement was first attested in written sources in 1147 as Niwenhouen (literally, 'new manor') and as Neunhouen in 1238 and Vorm hoff (literally, 'in front of the manor') in 1488. The Slovene name Preddvor is a fused prepositional phrase that has lost its case inflection, from pred 'in front of' + dvor 'manor'. In the past the German name was Höflein.

== Mass grave ==
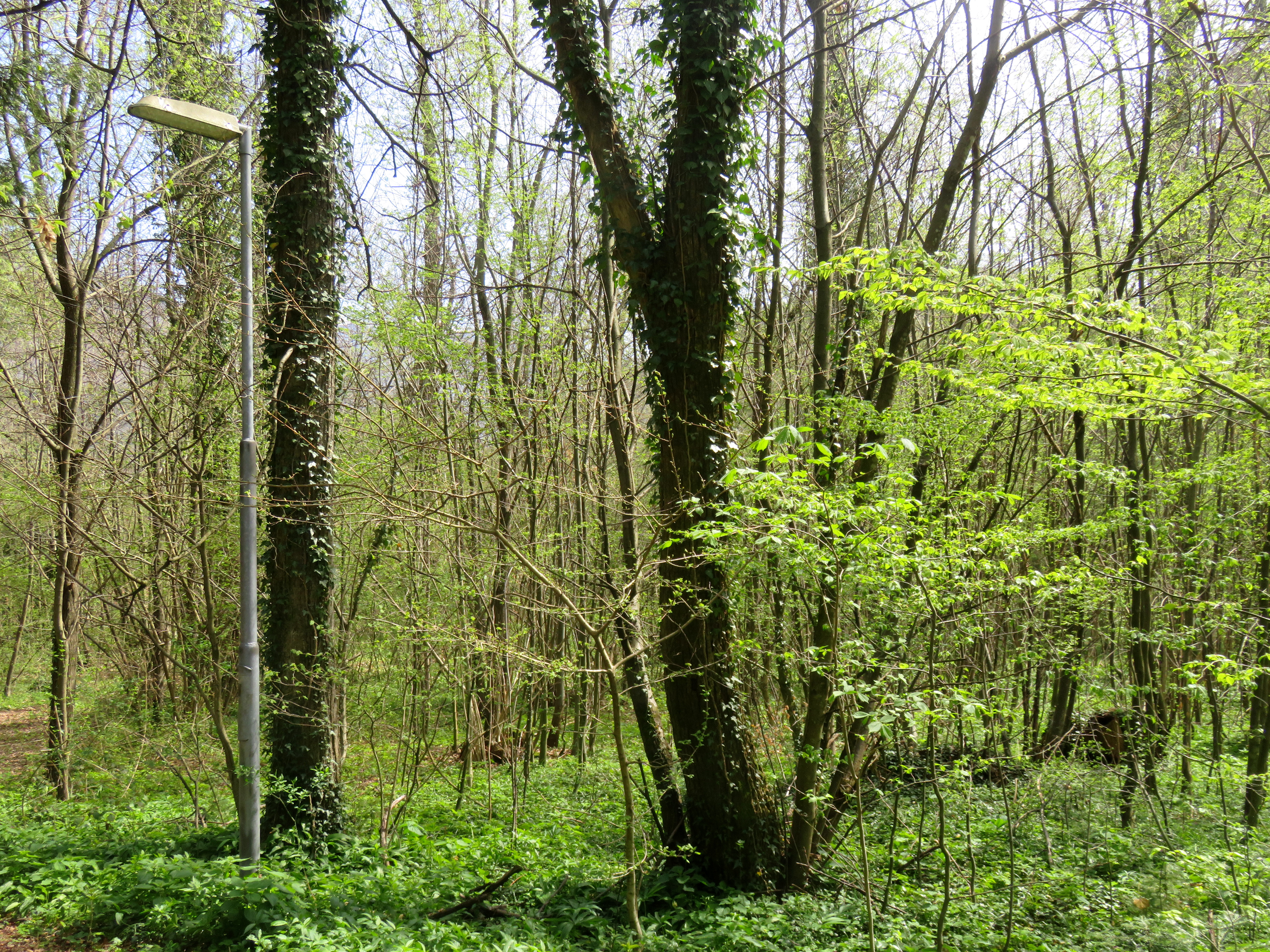
Danica Mansion Mass Grave

Preddvor is the site of a mass grave associated with the Second World War. The Danica Mansion Mass Grave (Slovene: Grobišče pri vili Danica) is located between the Danica Mansion and Lake Črnava, near the third light post from the lake. Human remains were unearthed here during excavation work in 1970. The remainder of the work avoided the area.

== Preddvor Castle ==
Preddvor Castle (Slovene: Grad Preddvor), also known as the Wurzbach Manor (Wurzbachova graščina), stands in the middle of the town. It was first mentioned in written sources in 1147, when it was granted to Viktring Abbey by Berthold II. It was taken over by Stična Abbey in 1608, which used it as a recuperation facility for ill and elderly monks. It was then purchased by the Wurzbach family; the physician Arthur Wurzbach sold the castle's land and farm buildings, and converted the building for tourism in 1920. It was sold again in 1936 and converted into a sanatorium with the name Hotel Grintavec. During the Second World War, the castle was used by the German military and police. In 1945 it served as a collection center for children from Bosnia, and in 1947 as a juvenile correction facility. After this it fell into disrepair.

== Church ==
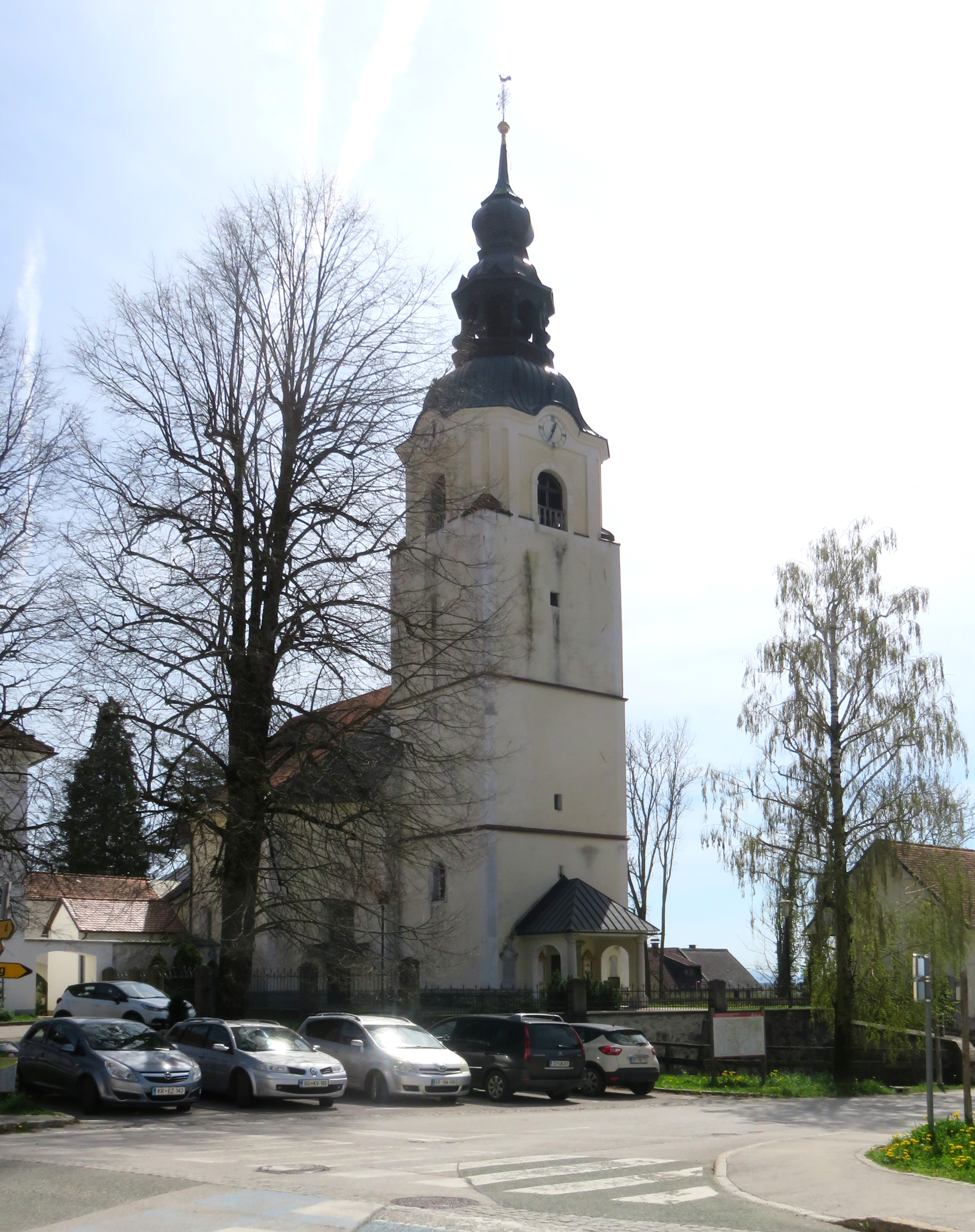
Saint Peter's Church

The church in Preddvor is dedicated to Saint Peter. It dates from the mid-18th century and contains a painting of the Last Supper by Janez Wolf (1825–1884) and frescoes by Matija Bradaška (1852–1915). The chapel in front of the church has paintings by Leopold Layer (1752–1828).
