= List of cities, towns, and villages in Slovenia: P =

This is a list of cities, towns, and villages in Slovenia, starting with P.

Settlement	Municipality
Pacinje	Ptuj
Padeški Vrh	Zreče
Padež	Laško
Padež	Vrhnika
Padež	Zagorje ob Savi
Padna	Piran
Padovo pri Fari	Kostel
Padovo pri Osilnici	Osilnica
Paha	Novo mesto
Paka - del	Mislinja
Paka pri Predgradu	Kočevje
Paka pri Velenju	Velenje
Paka	Dobrepolje
Paka	Vitanje
Pako	Borovnica
Palčje	Pivka
Paloviče	Tržič
Pameče	Slovenj Gradec
Pance	Ljubljana
Paneče	Laško
Pangrč Grm	Novo mesto
Pangršica	Kranj
Panovci	Gornji Petrovci
Papeži	Osilnica
Papirnica	Škofja Loka
Paradišče	Grosuplje
Paradiž	Gorišnica
Parecag	Piran
Paričjak	Radenci
Paridol	Šentjur
Parižlje	Braslovče
Parje	Pivka
Parož	Dobrna
Partizanski Vrh	Trbovlje
Paška vas	Šmartno ob Paki
Paški Kozjak	Velenje
Paunoviči	Črnomelj
Pavla vas	Sevnica
Pavlica	Ilirska Bistrica
Pavlova vas	Brežice
Pavlovci	Ormož
Pavlovski Vrh	Ormož
Pece	Grosuplje
Pecelj	Podčetrtek
Peč	Grosuplje
Pečarovci	Puconci
Peče	Moravče
Pečica	Šmarje pri Jelšah
Pečice	Brežice
Pečice	Litija
Pečine	Tolmin
Pečje	Sevnica
Pečke	Slovenska Bistrica
Pečki	Velike Lašče
Pečnik	Idrija
Pečovje	Štore
Pečovnik	Celje
Pekel	Maribor
Pekel	Trebnje
Pekre	Maribor
Penoje	Slovenske Konjice
Pepelno	Celje
Peračica	Radovljica
Peraji	Koper
Perati	Kobarid
Perišče	Brežice
Pernica	Pesnica
Pernice	Muta
Perniki	Bled
Pernovo	Žalec
Perovec	Slovenske Konjice
Perovo	Ribnica
Pertoča	Rogašovci
Perudina	Črnomelj
Pesje	Krško
Peskovci	Gornji Petrovci
Pesnica pri Mariboru	Pesnica
Pesnica	Kungota
Pesniški Dvor	Pesnica
Pestike	Zavrč
Peščeni Vrh	Cerkvenjak
Peščenik	Ivančna Gorica
Petane	Novo mesto
Petanjci	Tišina (občina)
Petelinje	Dol pri Ljubljani
Petelinje	Pivka
Petelinjek pri Ločah	Slovenske Konjice
Petelinjek	Novo mesto
Petišovci	Lendava
Petkovec	Logatec
Petrina	Kostel
Petrinci	Sodražica
Petrinje	Hrpelje-Kozina
Petrova vas	Črnomelj
Petrovče	Žalec
Petrovo Brdo	Tolmin
Petrušnja vas	Ivančna Gorica
Pevno	Škofja Loka
Pijana Gora	Krško
Pijava Gorica	Škofljica
Pijavice	Sevnica
Pijovci	Šmarje pri Jelšah
Pikovnik	Cerknica
Pilštanj	Kozje
Pince	Lendava
Pince-Marof	Lendava
Piran	Piran
Pirče	Kostel
Pirešica	Velenje
Pirmane	Cerknica
Piršenbreg	Brežice
Pirševo	Kamnik
Pisari	Koper
Pišece	Brežice
Pivka	Pivka
Pivola	Hoče-Slivnica
Placar	Destrnik
Placerovci	Gorišnica
Plač	Kungota
Plače	Ajdovščina
Planica	Kranj
Planica	Rače-Fram
Planina na Pohorju	Zreče
Planina nad Horjulom	Dobrova-Polhov Gradec
Planina pod Golico	Jesenice
Planina pod Šumikom	Slovenska Bistrica
Planina pri Cerknem	Cerkno
Planina pri Raki	Krško
Planina pri Sevnici	Šentjur
Planina v Podbočju	Krško
Planina	Ajdovščina
Planina	Ivančna Gorica
Planina	Kostel
Planina	Ljubno
Planina	Postojna
Planina	Semič
Planinca	Brezovica
Planinca	Šentjur
Planinska vas	Šentjur
Planinska vas	Trbovlje
Planinski Vrh	Šentjur
Planjsko	Majšperk
Plat	Mežica
Plat	Rogaška Slatina
Platinovec	Šmarje pri Jelšah
Plave	Kanal
Plavje	Koper
Plavški Rovt	Jesenice
Plazovje	Laško
Plemberk	Novo mesto
Ples	Bistrica ob Sotli
Ples	Moravče
Plesko	Hrastnik
Pleš	Žužemberk
Pleše	Škofljica
Plešivec	Velenje
Plešivica pri Žalni	Grosuplje
Plešivica	Brezovica
Plešivica	Ljutomer
Plešivica	Sežana
Plešivica	Žužemberk
Plešivo	Brda
Pleterje	Kidričevo
Pleterje	Krško
Pletovarje	Šentjur
Plintovec	Kungota
Pliskovica	Sežana
Plitvica	Gornja Radgona
Plitvički Vrh	Gornja Radgona
Plodršnica	Šentilj
Plosovo	Velike Lašče
Pluska	Trebnje
Plužna	Bovec
Plužnje	Cerkno
Pobegi	Koper
Pobrež	Oplotnica
Pobrežje	Črnomelj
Pobrežje	Videm
Počakovo	Radeče
Poče	Cerkno
Počehova	Maribor
Počenik	Pesnica
Podbela	Kobarid
Podbeže	Ilirska Bistrica
Podblica	Kranj
Podboč	Slovenska Bistrica
Podbočje	Krško
Podboršt pri Komendi	Komenda
Podboršt	Ivančna Gorica
Podboršt	Sevnica
Podbrdo	Tolmin
Podbreg	Kamnik
Podbreg	Vipava
Podbrezje	Naklo
Podbreže	Sežana
Podbukovje pri Vačah	Litija
Podbukovje	Ivančna Gorica
Podcerkev	Loška Dolina
Podčetrtek	Podčetrtek
Poden	Kostel
Podgaj	Šentjur
Podgora pri Dolskem	Dol pri Ljubljani
Podgora pri Ložu	Loška Dolina
Podgora pri Zlatem Polju	Lukovica
Podgora	Dobrepolje
Podgora	Gorenja vas-Poljane
Podgora	Novo mesto
Podgora	Ravne na Koroškem
Podgora	Šmartno ob Paki
Podgorci	Ormož
Podgorica pri Pečah	Moravče
Podgorica pri Podtaboru	Grosuplje
Podgorica pri Šmarju	Grosuplje
Podgorica	Dobrepolje
Podgorica	Sevnica
Podgorje ob Sevnični	Sevnica
Podgorje pod Čerinom	Vojnik
Podgorje pri Letušu	Braslovče
Podgorje pri Pišecah	Brežice
Podgorje	Gornja Radgona
Podgorje	Kamnik
Podgorje	Koper
Podgorje	Slovenj Gradec
Podgorje	Velenje
Podgozd	Nova Gorica
Podgozd	Žužemberk
Podgračeno	Brežice
Podgrad na Pohorju	Slovenska Bistrica
Podgrad pri Vremah	Divača
Podgrad	Gornja Radgona
Podgrad	Ilirska Bistrica
Podgrad	Ljubljana
Podgrad	Novo mesto
Podgrad	Šentjur
Podgradje	Ljutomer
Podgraje	Ilirska Bistrica
Podgrič	Vipava
Podhojni Hrib	Velike Lašče
Podhom	Bled
Podhosta	Dolenjske Toplice
Podhruška	Kamnik
Podigrac	Kungota
Podjelje	Bohinj
Podjelovo Brdo	Gorenja vas-Poljane
Podjelše	Kamnik
Podklanc	Dravograd
Podklanec	Črnomelj
Podklanec	Sodražica
Podklanec	Žiri
Podkočna	Jesenice
Podkogelj	Velike Lašče
Podkoren	Kranjska Gora
Podkraj pri Mežici	Mežica
Podkraj pri Velenju	Velenje
Podkraj pri Zagorju	Zagorje ob Savi
Podkraj	Ajdovščina
Podkraj	Hrastnik
Podkraj	Ravne na Koroškem
Podkraj	Velike Lašče
Podkraj	Žalec
Podkum	Zagorje ob Savi
Podlanišče	Cerkno
Podlehnik	Podlehnik
Podlesje	Kočevje
Podlešje	Šentjur
Podlipa	Krško
Podlipa	Vrhnika
Podlipa	Žužemberk
Podlipoglav	Ljubljana
Podlipovica	Zagorje ob Savi
Podlisec	Trebnje
Podljubelj	Tržič
Podlog pod Bohorjem	Šentjur
Podlog v Savinjski Dolini	Žalec
Podlog	Črnomelj
Podlog	Velike Lašče
Podlom	Kamnik
Podlonk	Železniki
Podlož	Loška Dolina
Podlože	Majšperk
Podmelec	Tolmin
Podmilj	Lukovica
Podmolnik	Ljubljana
Podnanos	Vipava
Podnart	Radovljica
Podob	Slovenske Konjice
Podobeno	Gorenja vas-Poljane
Podolnica	Horjul
Podolševa	Solčava
Podova	Rače-Fram
Podpeca	Črna na Koroškem
Podpeč nad Marofom	Šentjur
Podpeč ob Dravinji	Slovenske Konjice
Podpeč pod Skalo	Litija
Podpeč pri Šentvidu	Šentjur
Podpeč	Brezovica
Podpeč	Dobrepolje
Podpeč	Koper
Podplanina	Loški Potok
Podplat	Rogaška Slatina
Podpleče	Cerkno
Podplešivica	Brezovica
Podporezen	Železniki
Podpreska	Loški Potok
Podpulfrca	Škofja Loka
Podraga	Vipava
Podreber	Dobrova-Polhov Gradec
Podreber	Semič
Podreča	Kranj
Podrečje	Domžale
Podroje	Litija
Podsabotin	Brda
Podskrajnik	Cerknica
Podslivnica	Cerknica
Podsmrečje	Lukovica
Podsmreka pri Velikih Laščah	Velike Lašče
Podsmreka pri Višnji Gori	Ivančna Gorica
Podsmreka	Dobrova-Polhov Gradec
Podsreda	Kozje
Podstene pri Kostelu	Kostel
Podstene	Kočevje
Podstenice	Dolenjske Toplice
Podstenje	Ilirska Bistrica
Podstenjšek	Ilirska Bistrica
Podstran	Moravče
Podstrm	Krško
Podstrmec	Velike Lašče
Podstudenec	Kamnik
Podšentjur	Litija
Podtabor	Dobrepolje
Podtabor	Ilirska Bistrica
Podturn pri Dolenjskih Toplicah	Dolenjske Toplice
Podturn	Rogaška Slatina
Podturn	Trebnje
Podulaka	Velike Lašče
Podulce	Krško
Podvelka	Podvelka
Podveža	Luče
Podvin pri Polzeli	Polzela
Podvin	Žalec
Podvinci	Ptuj
Podvine	Šentjur
Podvinje	Brežice
Podvolovljek	Luče
Podvrh	Braslovče
Podvrh	Gorenja vas-Poljane
Podvrh	Osilnica
Podvrh	Sevnica
Podzemelj	Metlika
Podžaga	Velike Lašče
Pogled	Gornja Radgona
Pogled	Moravče
Pogonik	Litija
Pohorje	Gorišnica
Poklek nad Blanco	Sevnica
Poklek pri Podsredi	Kozje
Pokojišče	Vrhnika
Pokojnica	Ivančna Gorica
Pokoše	Slovenska Bistrica
Polajna	Zreče
Polana	Hoče-Slivnica
Polana	Laško
Polana	Murska Sobota
Polenci	Dornava
Polene	Slovenske Konjice
Polenšak	Dornava
Poletiči	Koper
Polhov Gradec	Dobrova-Polhov Gradec
Polhovica	Šentjernej
Polica	Grosuplje
Polica	Naklo
Police	Cerkno
Police	Gornja Radgona
Polička vas	Pesnica
Polički Vrh	Pesnica
Poljana	Kamnik
Poljana	Prevalje
Poljane nad Blagovico	Lukovica
Poljane nad Škofjo Loko	Gorenja vas-Poljane
Poljane pri Mirni Peči	Mirna Peč
Poljane pri Podgradu	Hrpelje-Kozina
Poljane pri Primskovem	Litija
Poljane pri Stični	Ivančna Gorica
Poljane pri Štjaku	Sežana
Poljane pri Žužemberku	Žužemberk
Poljane	Cerkno
Poljane	Mozirje
Poljčane	Slovenska Bistrica
Poljče	Braslovče
Poljče	Radovljica
Polje ob Sotli	Podčetrtek
Polje pri Bistrici	Bistrica ob Sotli
Polje pri Tržišču	Sevnica
Polje pri Višnji Gori	Ivančna Gorica
Polje pri Vodicah	Vodice
Polje	Bohinj
Polje	Tolmin
Poljšica pri Gorjah	Bled
Poljšica pri Podnartu	Radovljica
Poljubinj	Tolmin
Polom	Kočevje
Polšeče	Bloke
Polšina	Zagorje ob Savi
Polšnik	Litija
Polzela	Polzela
Polzelo	Velike Lašče
Polžanska Gorca	Šmarje pri Jelšah
Polžanska vas	Šmarje pri Jelšah
Polže	Vojnik
Pomjan	Koper
Pondor	Tabor (občina)
Pongrac	Žalec
Pongrce	Kidričevo
Ponikva pri Žalcu	Žalec
Ponikva	Šentjur
Ponikve pri Studencu	Sevnica
Ponikve	Brežice
Ponikve	Cerknica
Ponikve	Dobrepolje
Ponikve	Sežana
Ponikve	Tolmin
Ponkvica	Šentjur
Ponova vas	Grosuplje
Ponoviče	Litija
Popetre	Koper
Popovci	Videm
Popovo	Tržič
Pordašinci	Moravske Toplice
Poreber	Kamnik
Poreče	Vipava
Porezen	Tolmin
Portorož	Piran
Posavec	Radovljica
Postaja	Tolmin
Postojna	Postojna
Poštena vas	Brežice
Potarje	Tržič
Potiskavec	Dobrepolje
Potoče	Ajdovščina
Potoče	Divača
Potoče	Preddvor
Potok pri Dornberku	Nova Gorica
Potok pri Komendi	Komenda
Potok pri Muljavi	Ivančna Gorica
Potok pri Vačah	Litija
Potok v Črni	Kamnik
Potok	Idrija
Potok	Kamnik
Potok	Kostel
Potok	Nazarje
Potok	Novo mesto
Potok	Trebnje
Potok	Železniki
Potoki	Jesenice
Potoki	Kobarid
Potoki	Semič
Potoška vas	Zagorje ob Savi
Potov Vrh	Novo mesto
Povčeno	Laško
Povir	Sežana
Povlje	Kranj
Povodje	Vodice
Površje	Krško
Povžane	Hrpelje-Kozina
Pozirno	Škofja Loka
Poznanovci	Puconci
Poznikovo	Velike Lašče
Požarje	Zagorje ob Savi
Požeg	Rače-Fram
Poženik	Cerklje na Gorenjskem
Požnica	Laško
Prade	Koper
Pragersko	Slovenska Bistrica
Prapetno Brdo	Tolmin
Prapetno	Tolmin
Prapreče - del	Trbovlje
Prapreče - del	Zagorje ob Savi
Prapreče pri Straži	Novo mesto
Prapreče pri Šentjerneju	Šentjernej
Prapreče	Vransko
Prapreče	Žužemberk
Prapretno pri Hrastniku - del	Hrastnik
Prapretno pri Hrastniku - del	Trbovlje
Prapretno	Radeče
Prapretno	Šentjur
Praproče pri Grosupljem	Grosuplje
Praproče pri Temenici	Ivančna Gorica
Praproče v Tuhinju	Kamnik
Praproče	Dobrova-Polhov Gradec
Praproče	Koper
Praproče	Radovljica
Praproče	Ribnica
Praproče	Semič
Praprot	Semič
Praprotna Polica	Cerklje na Gorenjskem
Praprotnica	Mirna
Praprotno Brdo	Logatec
Praprotno	Škofja Loka
Praše	Kranj
Prazniki	Velike Lašče
Prebačevo	Šenčur
Prebold	Prebold
Precetinci	Ljutomer
Preclava	Ormož
Prečna	Novo mesto
Predanovci	Puconci
Preddvor	Preddvor
Predel	Šmarje pri Jelšah
Predenca	Šmarje pri Jelšah
Predgrad	Kočevje
Predgriže	Idrija
Predjama	Postojna
Predloka	Koper
Predmeja	Ajdovščina
Predmost	Gorenja vas-Poljane
Predole	Grosuplje
Predoslje	Kranj
Predstruge	Dobrepolje
Pregara	Koper
Pregarje	Ilirska Bistrica
Prekopa	Vransko
Prekorje	Celje
Prelasko	Podčetrtek
Prelesje	Črnomelj
Prelesje	Gorenja vas-Poljane
Prelesje	Litija
Prelesje	Trebnje
Prelog	Domžale
Preloge pri Konjicah	Slovenske Konjice
Preloge pri Šmarju	Šmarje pri Jelšah
Preloge	Semič
Preloge	Slovenska Bistrica
Preloka	Črnomelj
Prelože pri Lokvi	Sežana
Prelože	Ilirska Bistrica
Prelska	Velenje
Prem	Ilirska Bistrica
Premagovce	Krško
Premančan	Koper
Prepolje	Starše
Prepuž	Slovenska Bistrica
Prerad	Dornava
Presečno	Dobje
Preserje pri Komnu	Komen
Preserje pri Lukovici	Lukovica
Preserje pri Radomljah	Domžale
Preserje pri Zlatem Polju	Lukovica
Preserje	Braslovče
Preserje	Brezovica
Preserje	Nova Gorica
Presika	Ljutomer
Preska nad Kostrevnico	Litija
Preska pri Dobrniču	Trebnje
Preska	Sevnica
Preska	Sodražica
Presladol	Krško
Prestranek	Postojna
Preša	Majšperk
Preški Vrh	Ravne na Koroškem
Prešna Loka	Sevnica
Prešnica	Hrpelje-Kozina
Pretrež	Slovenska Bistrica
Pretrž	Moravče
Prevale	Litija
Prevalje pod Krimom	Brezovica
Prevalje	Lukovica
Prevalje	Prevalje
Preveg	Litija
Prevoje pri Šentvidu	Lukovica
Prevoje	Lukovica
Prevole	Žužemberk
Prezrenje	Radovljica
Preža	Kočevje
Preženjske Njive	Litija
Prežganje	Ljubljana
Prežigal	Slovenske Konjice
Prhajevo	Velike Lašče
pri Cerkvi-Struge	Dobrepolje
Pribinci	Črnomelj
Pribišje	Semič
Prigorica	Ribnica
Prihodi	Jesenice
Prihova	Nazarje
Prihova	Oplotnica
Prikrnica	Moravče
Prilesje	Lukovica
Prilesje	Velike Lašče
Prilipe	Brežice
Prilozje	Metlika
Primča vas	Ivančna Gorica
Primostek	Metlika
Primož pri Ljubnem	Ljubno
Primož pri Šentjurju	Šentjur
Primož	Sevnica
Primoži	Kočevje
Primskovo	Litija
Primštal	Trebnje
Pristava nad Stično	Ivančna Gorica
Pristava ob Krki	Krško
Pristava pod Rako	Krško
Pristava pri Lesičnem	Podčetrtek
Pristava pri Leskovcu	Krško
Pristava pri Mestinju	Podčetrtek
Pristava pri Polhovem Gradcu	Dobrova-Polhov Gradec
Pristava pri Šentjerneju	Šentjernej
Pristava pri Višnji Gori	Ivančna Gorica
Pristava	Borovnica
Pristava	Gorišnica
Pristava	Ljutomer
Pristava	Nova Gorica
Pristava	Novo mesto
Pristava	Sežana
Pristava	Tržič
Pristava	Vojnik
Pristavica pri Velikem Gabru	Trebnje
Pristavica	Rogaška Slatina
Pristavica	Šentjernej
Pristavlja vas	Ivančna Gorica
Pristavo	Brda
Pristova	Dobrna
Prnek	Rogaška Slatina
Prosečka vas	Puconci
Proseniško	Šentjur
Prosenjakovci	Moravske Toplice
Prožinska vas	Štore
Pršetinci	Ormož
Prtovč	Železniki
Prušnja vas	Krško
Prvačina	Nova Gorica
Prvenci	Markovci
Prvine	Lukovica
Pšajnovica	Kamnik
Pšata	Cerklje na Gorenjskem
Pšata	Domžale
Pšenična Polica	Cerklje na Gorenjskem
Pševo	Kranj
Ptuj	Ptuj
Ptujska Cesta	Gornja Radgona
Ptujska Gora	Majšperk
Puc	Kostel
Puconci	Puconci
Puče	Koper
Pudob	Loška Dolina
Pugled pri Karlovici	Ribnica
Pugled pri Mokronogu	Trebnje
Pugled pri Starem Logu	Kočevje
Pugled	Semič
Pungert	Ivančna Gorica
Pungert	Loški Potok
Pungert	Škofja Loka
Purga	Črnomelj
Purkače	Velike Lašče
Pusti Gradec	Črnomelj
Pusti Hrib	Ribnica
Pusti Javor	Ivančna Gorica
Pustike	Šmarje pri Jelšah
Pusto Polje	Nazarje
Puščava	Lovrenc na Pohorju
Puščava	Trebnje
Pušče	Velike Lašče
Pušenci	Ormož
Puštal	Škofja Loka
Puževci	Puconci
