= Potok =

Potok may refer to:

== Places ==
=== Bulgaria ===
- Potok, Bulgaria, a village in Gabrovo Province

=== Croatia ===
- Potok, Berek, a village in Bjelovar-Bilogora County
- Potok Kalnički, a village in Kalnik, Koprivnica-Križevci County
- Potok, Sisak-Moslavina County, a village near Popovača
- Potok, a local name of the Pazinčica River
- Potok, Rijeka, a section of Rijeka
- Potok Bosiljevski, a village near Bosiljevo, Karlovac County
- Potok Musulinski, a village near Ogulin, Karlovac County
- Potok Tounjski, a village near Tounj, Karlovac County

=== Poland ===
- Potok, Gmina Sobienie-Jeziory in Masovian Voivodeship (east-central Poland), a settlement
- Potok, Kutno County in Łódź Voivodeship (central), a village
- Potok, Kuyavian-Pomeranian Voivodeship (north-central), a village
- Potok, Lublin Voivodeship (east), a village
- Potok, Lubusz Voivodeship (west), a village
- Potok, Opatów County in Świętokrzyskie Voivodeship (south-central), a village
- Potok, Podkarpackie Voivodeship (south-eastern), a village
- Potok, Pomeranian Voivodeship (north), a settlement
- Potok, Sieradz County in Łódź Voivodeship (central), a village
- Potok, Subcarpathian Voivodeship (south-east)
- Potok, Staszów County, Świętokrzyskie Voivodeship (south-central), a village

=== Romania ===
- Potok, the Hungarian name for Potoc village, Sasca Montană Commune, Caraş-Severin County, Romania

=== Serbia ===
- Potok (Prijepolje), a village

=== Slovakia ===
- Potok, Rimavská Sobota District, a village
- Potok, Ružomberok District, a village

=== Slovenia ===
- Potok, Idrija, a village
- Potok, Kamnik, a village
- Potok, Kostel, a village
- Potok, Nazarje, a village
- Potok, Straža, a village
- Potok, Trebnje, a village
- Potok, Vodice, a former village
- Potok, Železniki, a village
- Potok Cave, an archaeological and paleontological site

== Military uses ==
- a Russian mercenary group set up by Gazprom

== Other uses ==
- Potok (company), a Russian investment and development company
- Potok (surname)

== See also ==
- Potoc
