= POTOC =

POTOC or Potoc may refer to:

- Potteries Orienteering Club
- Potoc, a river in Romania
- A village in Sasca Montană, Romania

== See also ==
- Potoče (disambiguation)
- Potoci (disambiguation)
- Potok (disambiguation)
