= Pecice =

Pecice or Pečice may refer to:

== Czech Republic ==
- Pečice (Příbram District), a municipality and village in the Central Bohemian Region
- Pěčice, a municipality and village in the Central Bohemian Region

== Poland ==
- Pęcice, a village in Masovian Voivodeship

== Slovenia ==
- Pečice, Brežice, a village in the Municipality of Brežice, eastern Slovenia
- Pečice, Litija, a village in the Municipality of Litija, central Slovenia
