= Potoci =

Potoci may refer to:

Bosnia and Herzegovina

- Potoci, Drvar
- Potoci, Istočni Drvar
- Potoci, Mostar

Montenegro

- Potoci, Pljevlja

Romania

- Potoci, a village in Bicaz, Romania

== See also ==
- Potok (disambiguation)
- Potoc, a village in the commune Sasca Montană, Romania
- Potoc, a river in Arad County, Romania
