= Podlipa =

Podlipa may refer to the following places in Slovenia:

- Podlipa, Krško
- Podlipa, Vrhnika
- Podlipa, Žužemberk
