= Potoče =

Potoče may refer to the following places in Slovenia:

- Potoče, Ajdovščina
- Potoče, Divača
- Potoče, Preddvor

== See also ==
- POTOC (disambiguation)
