= Purga, Črnomelj =

Purga
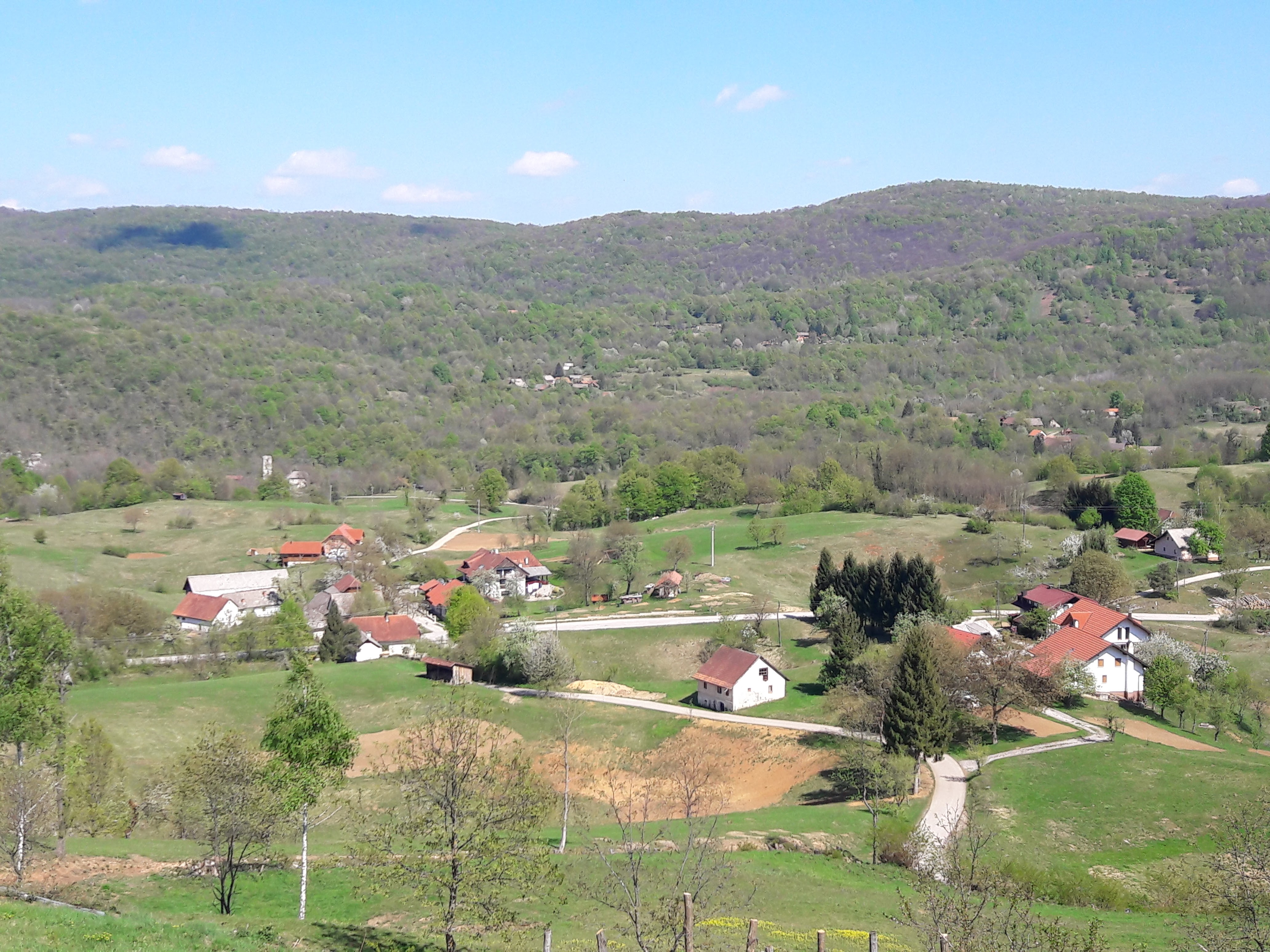

- Location in Slovenia
- Coordinates: 45°31′36.23″N 15°18′23.72″E
- Country: Slovenia
- Traditional region: White Carniola
- Statistical region: Southeast Slovenia
- Municipality: Črnomelj

Area
  - Total: 0.59 km^{2} (0.23 sq mi)
- Elevation: 204.8 m (672 ft)

Population (2020)
  - Total: 26
  - Density: 44/km^{2} (110/sq mi)
- Postal code: 8341

Purga (pronounced [ˈpuːɾɡa]) is a small settlement above the left bank of the Kolpa River north of Adlešiči in the Municipality of Črnomelj in the White Carniola area of southeastern Slovenia. The area is part of the traditional region of Lower Carniola and is now included in the Southeast Slovenia Statistical Region.

== History ==
Purga was founded on land formerly belonging to Pobrežje Castle in the second half of the 19th century. During the Second World War, Italian forces burned one house in the settlement. An additional three buildings were burned on 22 March 1945 during a German and Ustaša attack on Pobrežje and Adlešiči. Twelve Partisan soldiers were killed in Purga the same day.
