= Podpeč, Koper =

Podpeč Popecchio
- Location in Slovenia
- Coordinates: 45°31′21.24″N 13°54′26.65″E
- Country: Slovenia
- Traditional region: Littoral
- Statistical region: Coastal–Karst
- Municipality: Koper

Area
  - Total: 2.77 km^{2} (1.07 sq mi)
- Elevation: 311.5 m (1,022 ft)

Population (2002)
  - Total: 47

Podpeč (pronounced [ˈpoːtpɛtʃ]; Italian: Popecchio) is a settlement in the City Municipality of Koper in the Littoral region of Slovenia.

== Mass grave ==
Podpeč is the site of a mass grave associated with the Second World War. The Vilenica Mass Grave (Slovene: Grobišče Vilenica) is located in a shaft below a cliff edge, about 500 m south of Praproče. It contains the remains of undetermined victims. The remains that were visible were gathered in 1992 and were reburied in the Koper cemetery in 2004.

== Church ==
A small church in the settlement is dedicated to Saint Helena and belongs to the Parish of Predloka. It has no belfry, but contains some interesting late Gothic frescos.

== Fortified tower ==
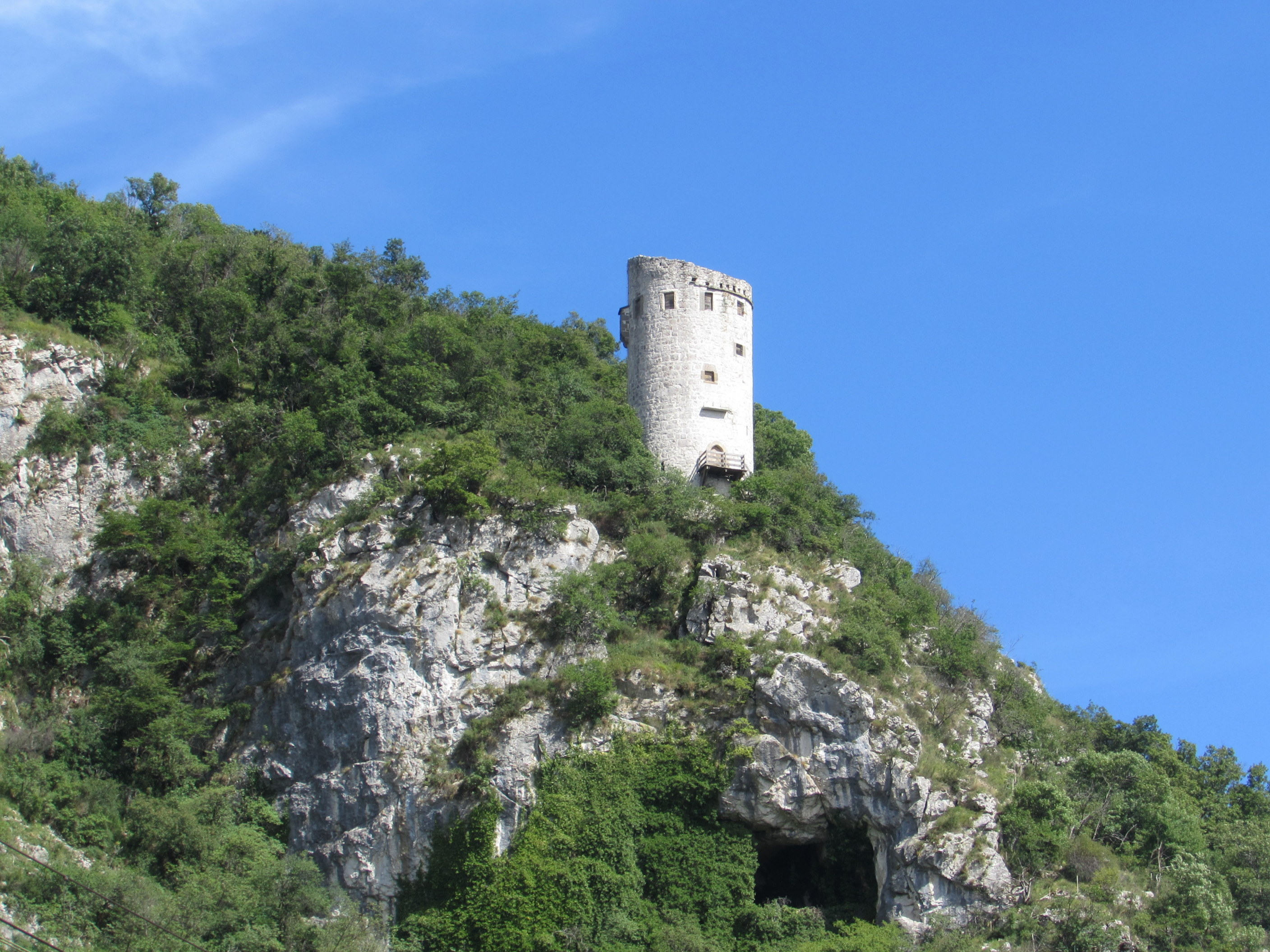
Venetian fortified tower

A Venetian fortified tower stands near the village.
