= Potok (surname) =

Potok is a surname. Notable people with the surname include:

- Anna Potok (1897–1987), Polish fashion designer and co-founder of Maximilian furriers, New York
- Chaim Potok (1929–2002), American rabbi and author
- Nancy Potok, former American government official who served as the Chief Statistician
