= Podgora, Gorenja Vas–Poljane =

Podgora
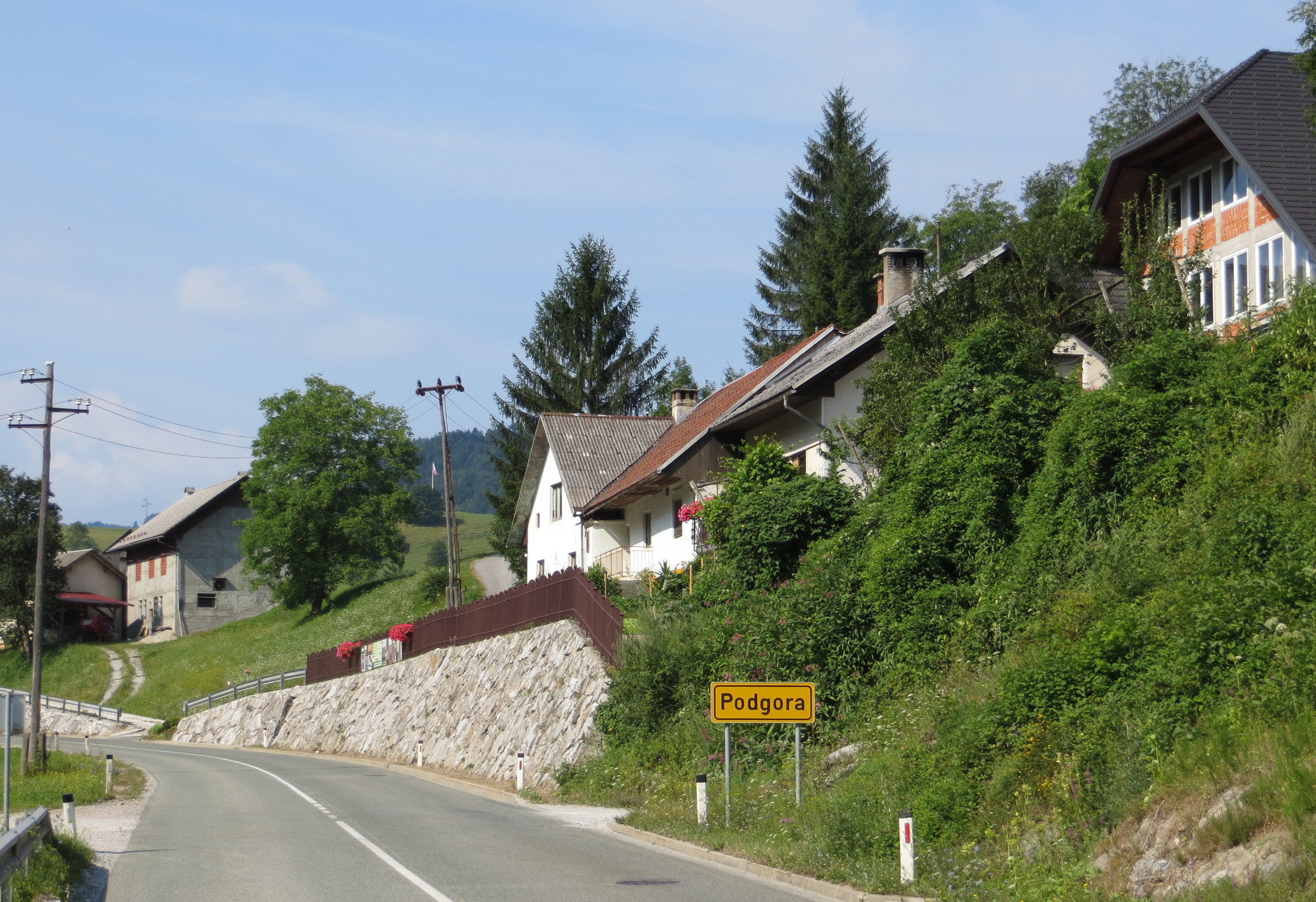

- Location in Slovenia
- Coordinates: 46°6′2.06″N 14°6′41.56″E
- Country: Slovenia
- Traditional region: Upper Carniola
- Statistical region: Upper Carniola
- Municipality: Gorenja Vas–Poljane

Area
  - Total: 2.46 km^{2} (0.95 sq mi)
- Elevation: 424.6 m (1,393 ft)

Population (2020)
  - Total: 197
  - Density: 80.1/km^{2} (207/sq mi)

Podgora (pronounced [pɔdˈɡɔːɾa]) is a settlement on the left bank of the Poljane Sora River near Gorenja Vas in the Municipality of Gorenja Vas–Poljane in the Upper Carniola region of Slovenia.
