= Podbukovje, Ivančna Gorica =

Podbukovje
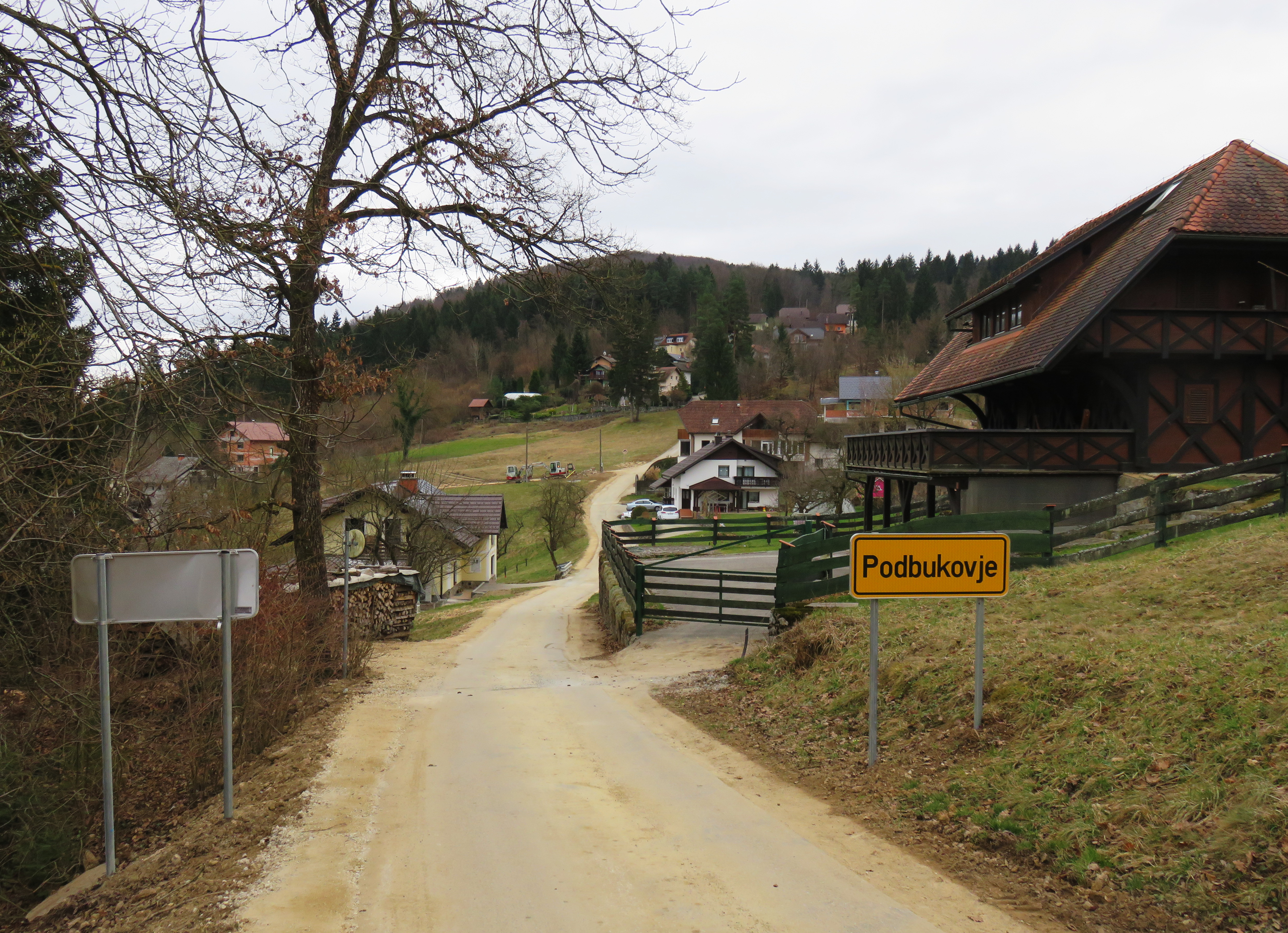

- Location in Slovenia
- Coordinates: 45°52′32.27″N 14°47′9.68″E
- Country: Slovenia
- Traditional region: Lower Carniola
- Statistical region: Central Slovenia
- Municipality: Ivančna Gorica

Area
  - Total: 3.62 km^{2} (1.40 sq mi)
- Elevation: 276.9 m (908 ft)

Population (2002)
  - Total: 104

Podbukovje (pronounced [pɔdˈbuːkɔu̯jɛ], German: Podbukuje) is a small village in the Municipality of Ivančna Gorica in central Slovenia. It lies on the right bank of the Krka River in the historical region of Lower Carniola. The municipality is now included in the Central Slovenia Statistical Region.

== History ==
Archaeological evidence from the area shows it was settled in prehistoric times.
