= Potok, Rimavská Sobota District =

Municipality in Slovakia

Potok Dobrapatak
- Municipality
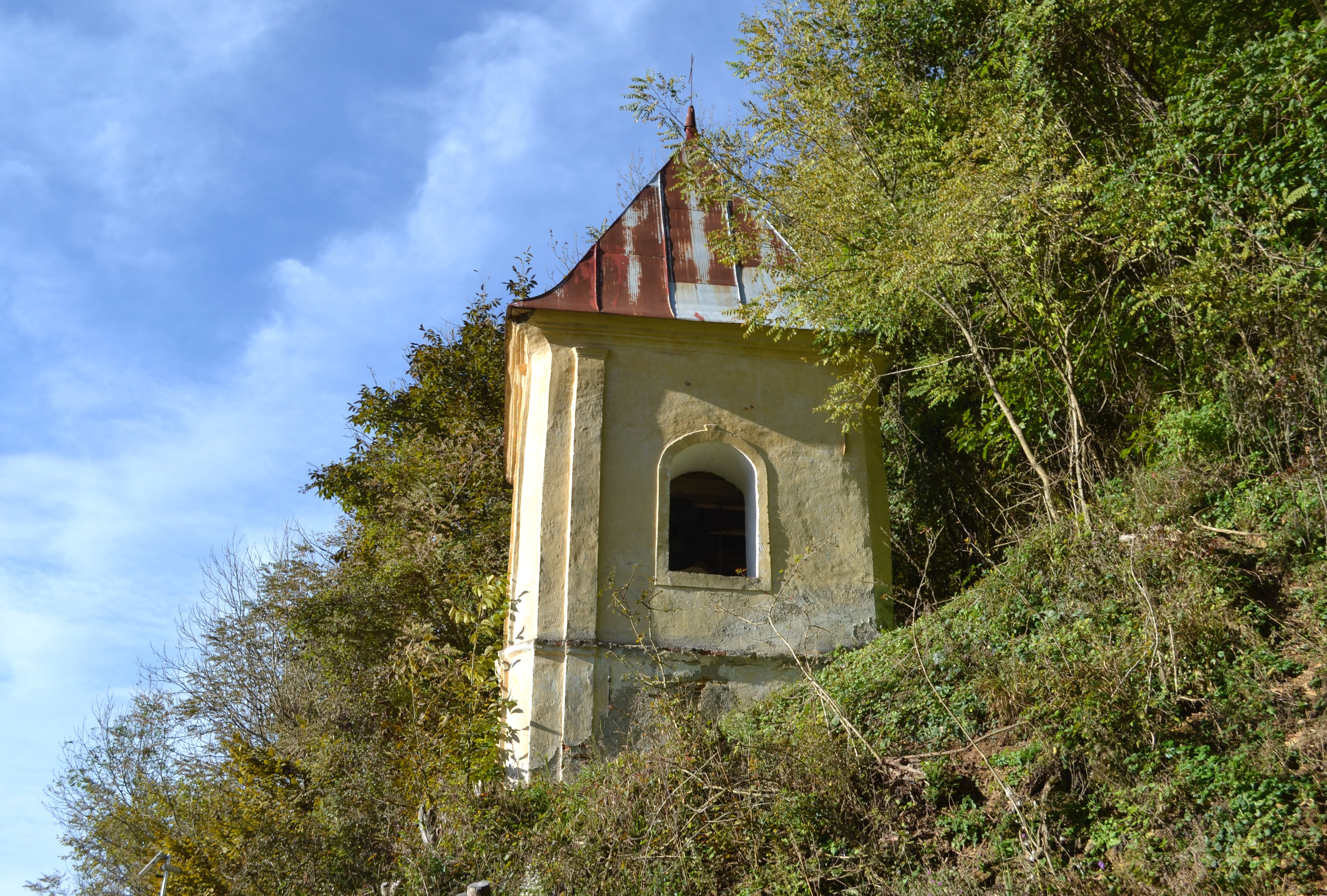

- Flag

- Location of Potok in the Banská Bystrica Region Location of Potok in Slovakia
- Coordinates: 48°33′36″N 20°03′05″E
- Country: Slovakia
- Region: Banská Bystrica Region
- District: Rimavská Sobota District
- First mentioned: 1323

Area
  - Total: 8.91 km^{2} (3.44 sq mi)
- Elevation: 301 m (988 ft)

Population (2025)
  - Total: 21
- Time zone: UTC+1 (CET)
  - Summer (DST): UTC+2 (CEST)
- Postal code: 982 67
- Area code: +421 47
- Vehicle registration plate (until 2022): RS
- Website: www.obecpotok.sk

Potok (Hungarian: Dobrapatak) is a village and municipality in the Rimavská Sobota District of the Banská Bystrica Region of southern Slovakia.

== Population ==
Population statistic (10 years)
Year	1995	2005	2015	2025
Count	60	37	29	21
Difference		−38.33%	−21.62%	−27.58%

Population statistic
Year	2024	2025
Count	21	21
Difference		+0%

It has a population of 21 people (31 December 2025).

=== Ethnicity ===
Census 2021 (1+ %)
Ethnicity	Number	Fraction
Slovak	21	100%
Total	21	

In year 2021 was 21 people by ethnicity 21 as Slovak.

Note on population: The difference values of population numbers in the table "Population statistic" and in the sections "Ethnicity" & "Religion" is caused by the use of various statistical methods.

=== Religion ===
Census 2021 (1+ %)
Religion	Number	Fraction
None	17	80.95%
Roman Catholic Church	2	9.52%
Evangelical Church	2	9.52%
Total	21	

In year 2021 was 21 people by religion 17 from None, 2 from Roman Catholic Church and 2 from Evangelical Church.
