= Pleš, Žužemberk =

Pleš
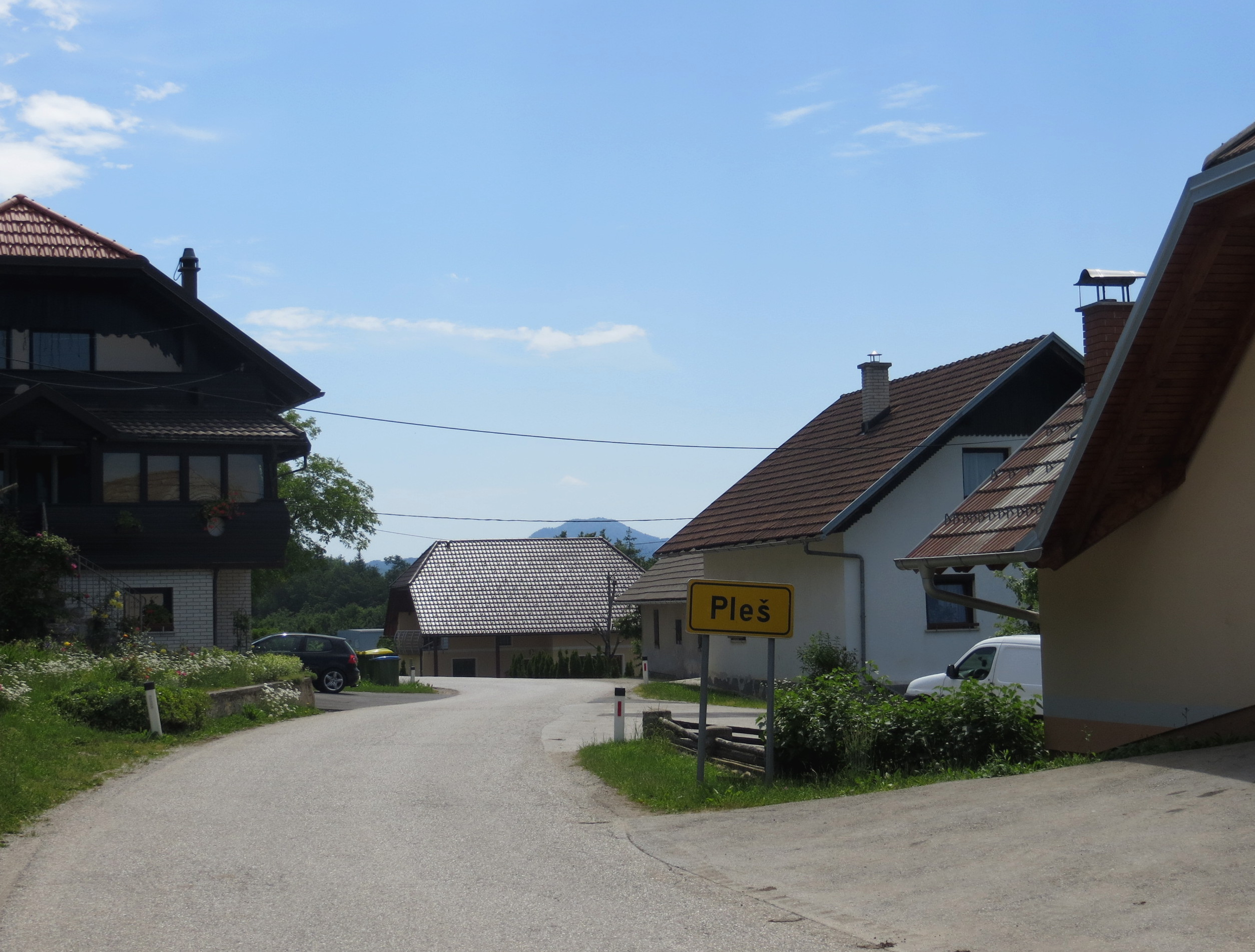

- Location in Slovenia
- Coordinates: 45°46′5″N 14°52′34.68″E
- Country: Slovenia
- Traditional region: Lower Carniola
- Statistical region: Southeast Slovenia
- Municipality: Žužemberk

Area
  - Total: 1.87 km^{2} (0.72 sq mi)
- Elevation: 506 m (1,660 ft)

Population (2002)
  - Total: 25

Pleš (pronounced [ˈpleːʃ]) is a small settlement west of Hinje in the Municipality of Žužemberk in southeastern Slovenia. The area is part of the traditional region of Lower Carniola. The municipality is now included in the Southeast Slovenia Statistical Region.

== Name ==
Like related names (e.g., Plešivec, Plešivica), the name Pleš is derived from the adjective pleš 'bare, barren of vegetation', referring to the local terrain.
