= Poljana, Kamnik =

Poljana
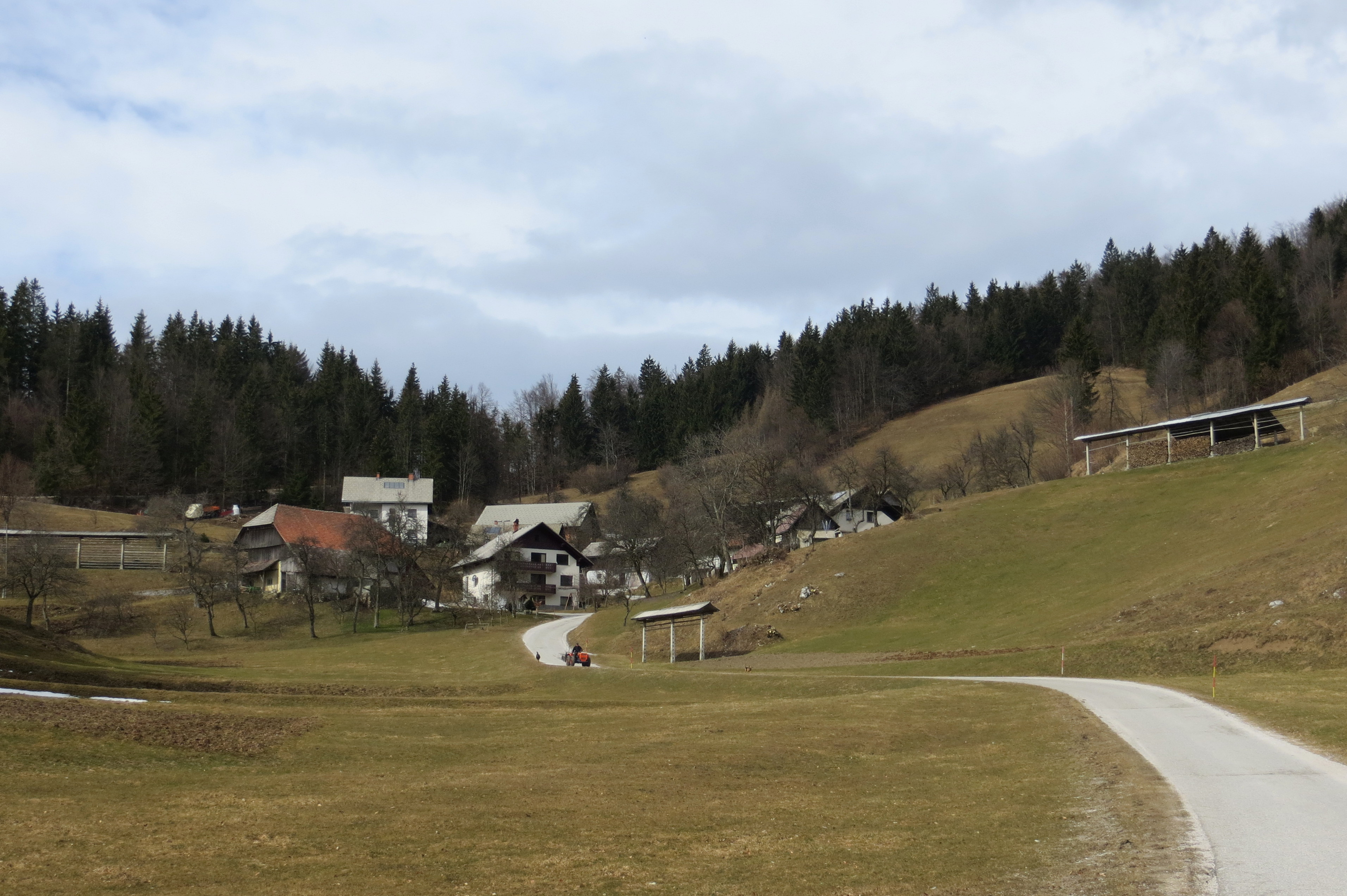

- Location in Slovenia
- Coordinates: 46°15′15.66″N 14°42′32.22″E
- Country: Slovenia
- Traditional region: Upper Carniola
- Statistical region: Central Slovenia
- Municipality: Kamnik

Area
  - Total: 0.42 km^{2} (0.16 sq mi)
- Elevation: 911 m (2,989 ft)

Population (2002)
  - Total: 21

Poljana (pronounced [pɔˈljaːna]) is a small settlement above the Črnivec Pass in the Municipality of Kamnik in the Upper Carniola region of Slovenia.
