= Prelog, Domžale =

Prelog
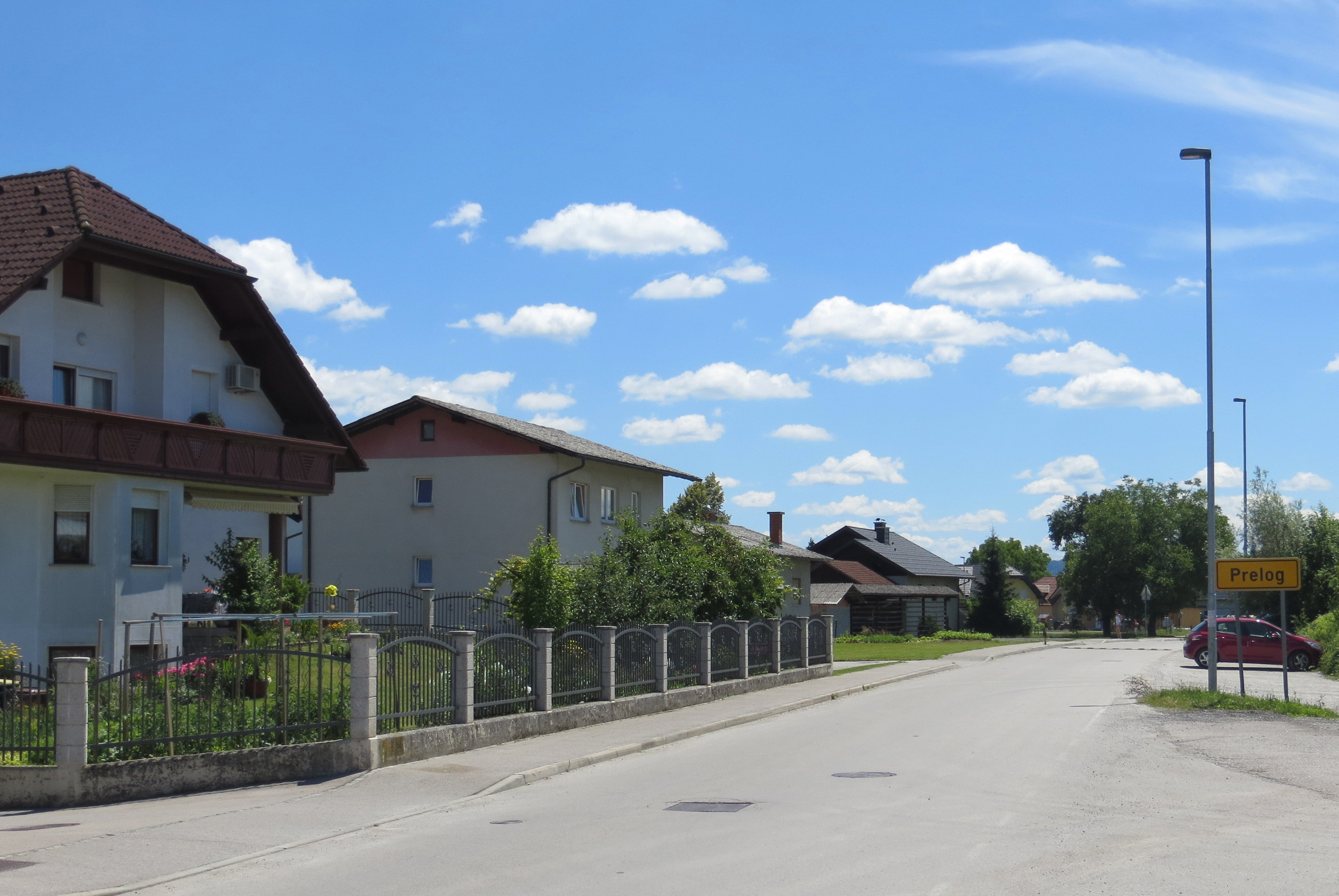

- Location in Slovenia
- Coordinates: 46°7′46.65″N 14°36′39.1″E
- Country: Slovenia
- Traditional region: Upper Carniola
- Statistical region: Central Slovenia
- Municipality: Domžale

Area
  - Total: 0.91 km^{2} (0.35 sq mi)
- Elevation: 296.1 m (971 ft)

Population (2020)
  - Total: 718
  - Density: 790/km^{2} (2,000/sq mi)

Prelog (pronounced [ˈpɾɛːlɔk]) is a settlement on the left bank of the Kamnik Bistrica River southeast of Domžale and north of Ihan in the Upper Carniola region of Slovenia.

== Name ==
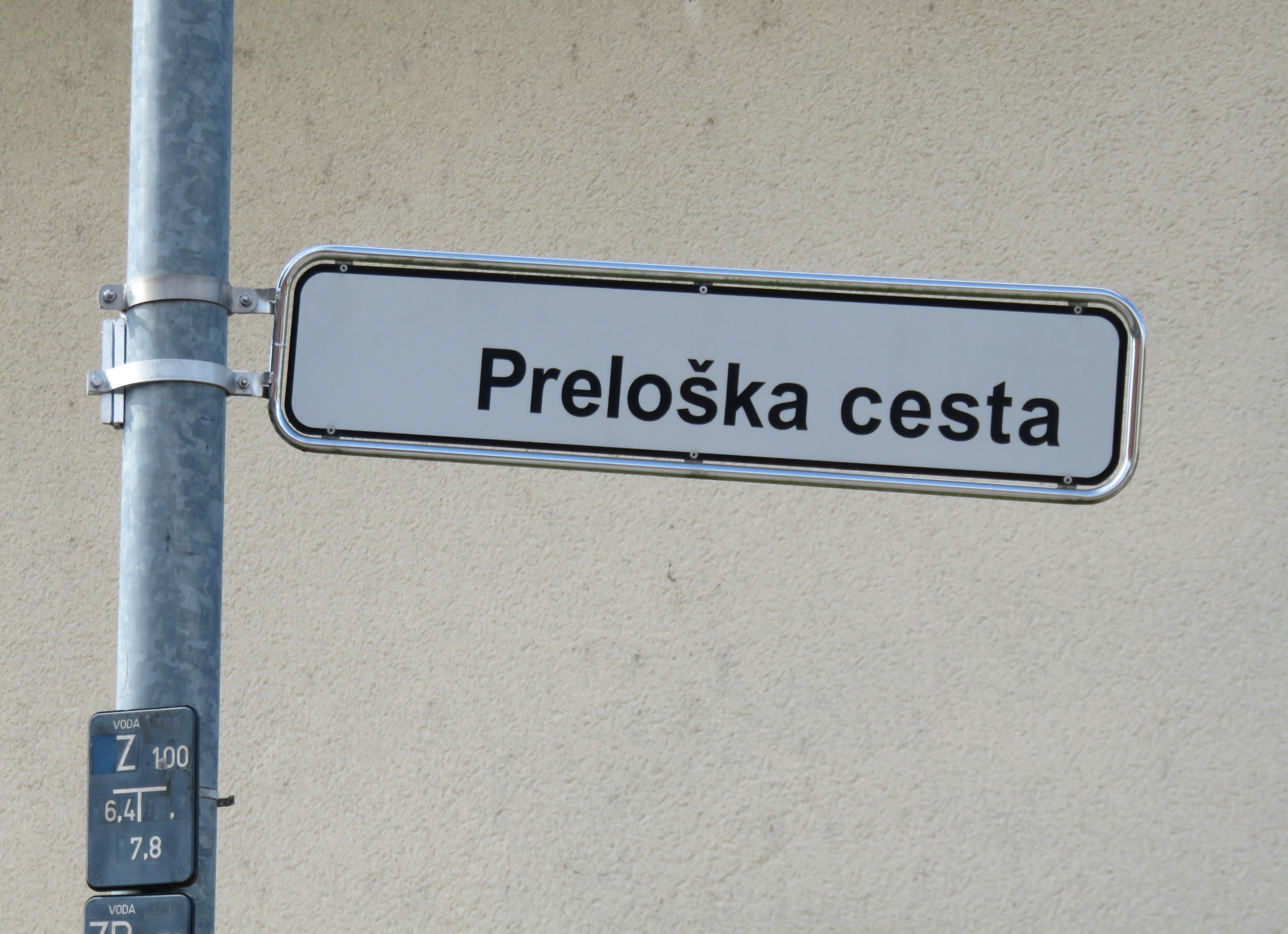
A sign for Prelog Street (Preloška cesta)

Prelog was attested in historical sources as Prelunk in 1345, Prelog in 1369, Prelokg in 1414, and Prelokch in 1451. The name is either derived from the common noun prelog 'fallow ground, abandoned field', or it is a fused prepositional phrase, from pre(d) 'in front of' + log '(swampy) meadow; grove'. In either case, the name refers to a local geographical feature.
