= Podboršt, Ivančna Gorica =

Podboršt
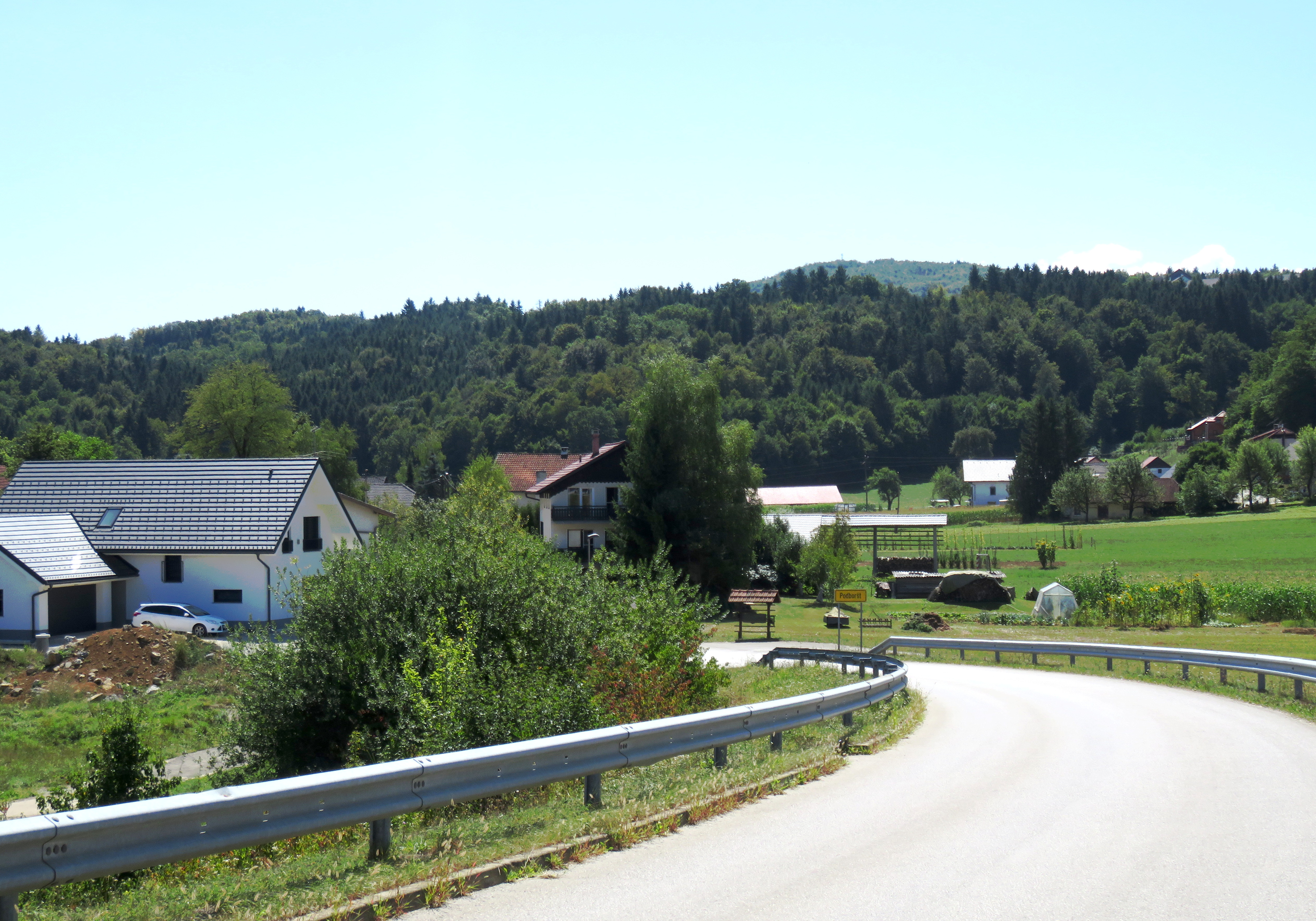

- Location in Slovenia
- Coordinates: 45°55′20.51″N 14°52′12.58″E
- Country: Slovenia
- Traditional region: Lower Carniola
- Statistical region: Central Slovenia
- Municipality: Ivančna Gorica

Area
  - Total: 1.84 km^{2} (0.71 sq mi)
- Elevation: 305 m (1,001 ft)

Population (2002)
  - Total: 106

Podboršt (pronounced [pɔdˈbɔɾʃt]) is a settlement in the Municipality of Ivančna Gorica in central Slovenia. It lies just south of the Slovenian A2 motorway in the historical region of Lower Carniola. The municipality is now included in the Central Slovenia Statistical Region.
