= Prevale, Litija =

Prevale
- Location in Slovenia
- Coordinates: 46°1′18.37″N 15°0′29.28″E
- Country: Slovenia
- Traditional region: Lower Carniola
- Statistical region: Central Sava
- Municipality: Litija

Area
  - Total: 1.03 km^{2} (0.40 sq mi)
- Elevation: 669.6 m (2,197 ft)
- Postal code: 1273

Prevale (pronounced [ˈpɾeːʋalɛ]) is a small settlement in the hills south of Dole in the Municipality of Litija in central Slovenia. It no longer has any permanent residents. The area is part of the traditional region of Lower Carniola. It is now included with the rest of the municipality in the Central Sava Statistical Region.
