= Pungert, Ivančna Gorica =

Pungert
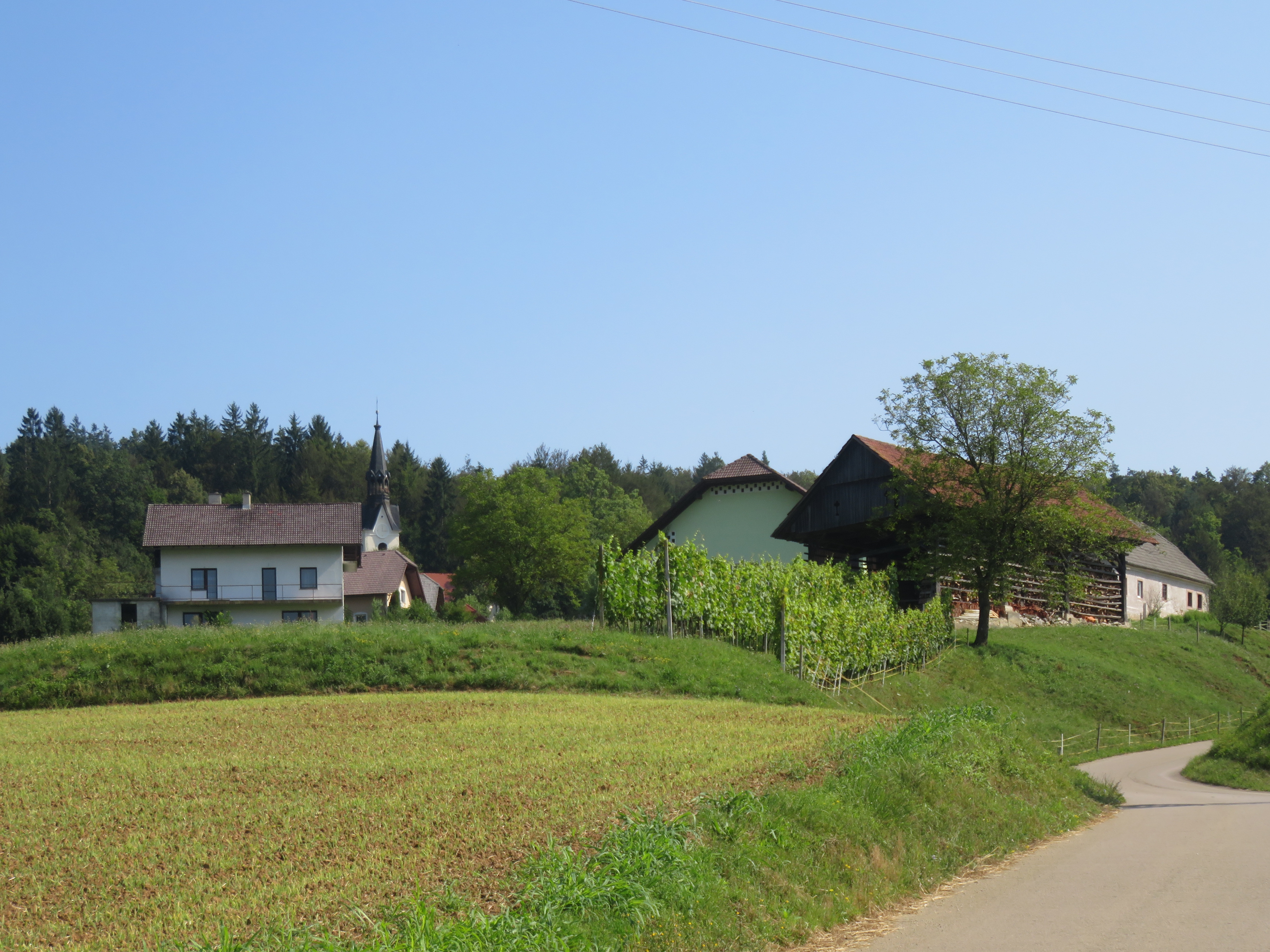

- Location in Slovenia
- Coordinates: 45°57′47.36″N 14°53′34.5″E
- Country: Slovenia
- Traditional region: Lower Carniola
- Statistical region: Central Slovenia
- Municipality: Ivančna Gorica

Area
  - Total: 1.22 km^{2} (0.47 sq mi)
- Elevation: 344.1 m (1,129 ft)

Population (2002)
  - Total: 30

Pungert (pronounced [ˈpuːŋɡɛɾt]) is a small settlement in the Municipality of Ivančna Gorica in central Slovenia. The area is part of the historical region of Lower Carniola. The municipality is now included in the Central Slovenia Statistical Region.

== Church ==
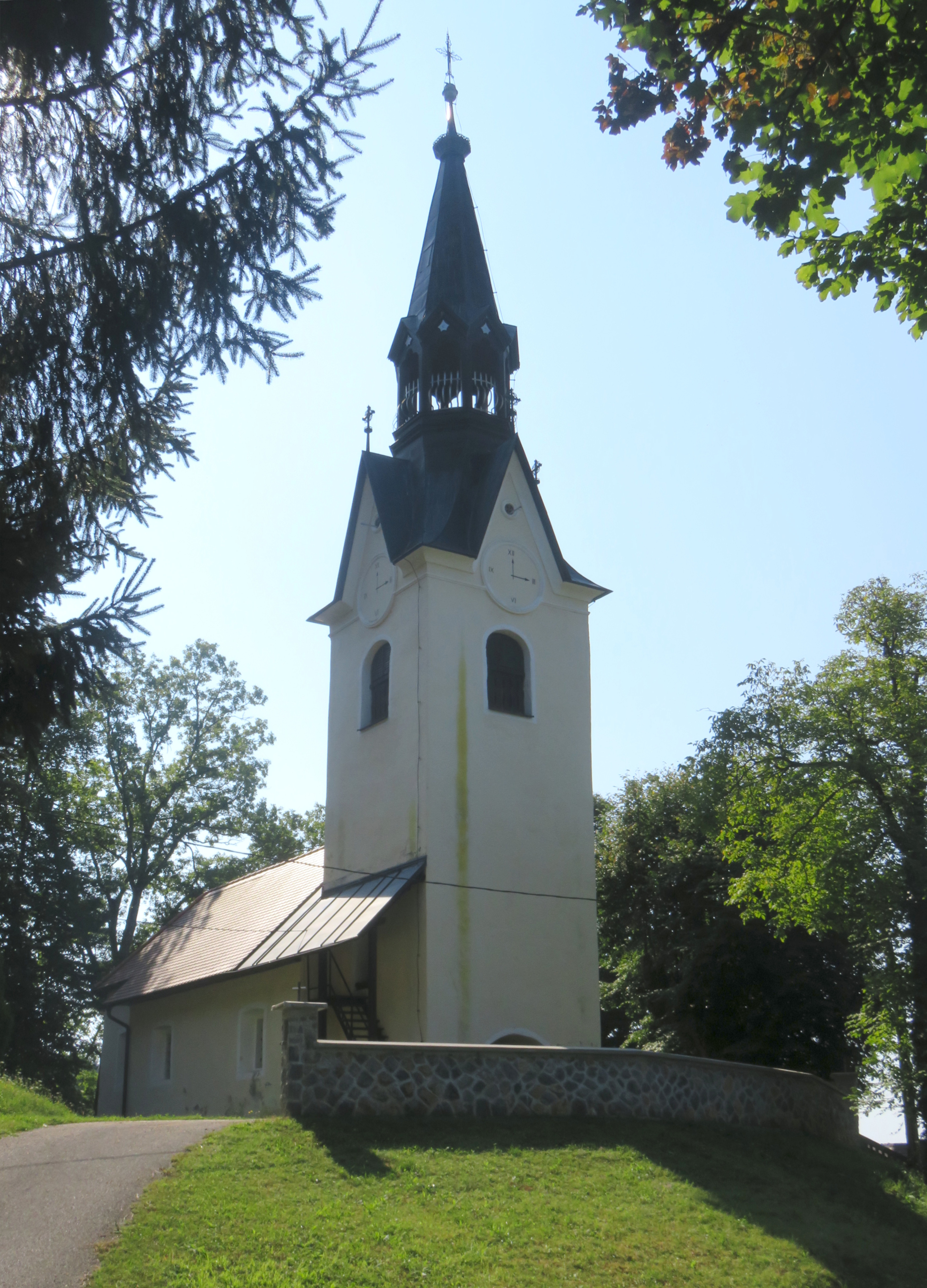
Saint Leonard's Church

The local church is dedicated to Saint Leonard and belongs to the Parish of Šentvid pri Stični. It dates to the 17th century.
