= Podbreg, Vipava =

Podbreg
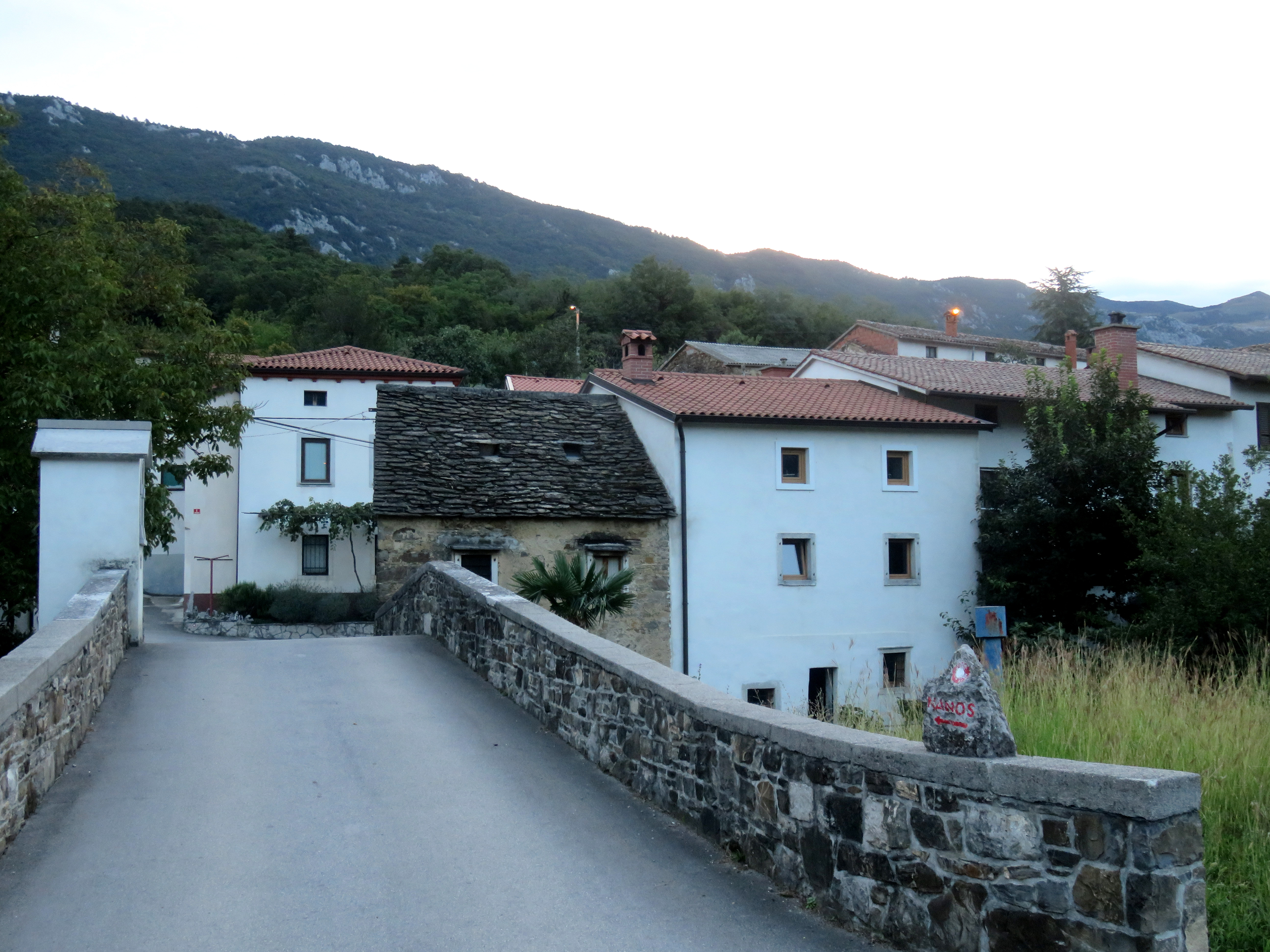

- Location in Slovenia
- Coordinates: 45°46′57.83″N 13°58′40.66″E
- Country: Slovenia
- Traditional region: Littoral
- Statistical region: Gorizia
- Municipality: Vipava

Area
  - Total: 1.77 km^{2} (0.68 sq mi)
- Elevation: 383.6 m (1,259 ft)

Population (2002)
  - Total: 94

Podbreg (pronounced [ˈpoːdbɾɛk]) is a small settlement in the upper Vipava Valley, next to Podnanos, in the Municipality of Vipava in the Littoral region of Slovenia.
