= Prevalje, Lukovica =

Prevalje
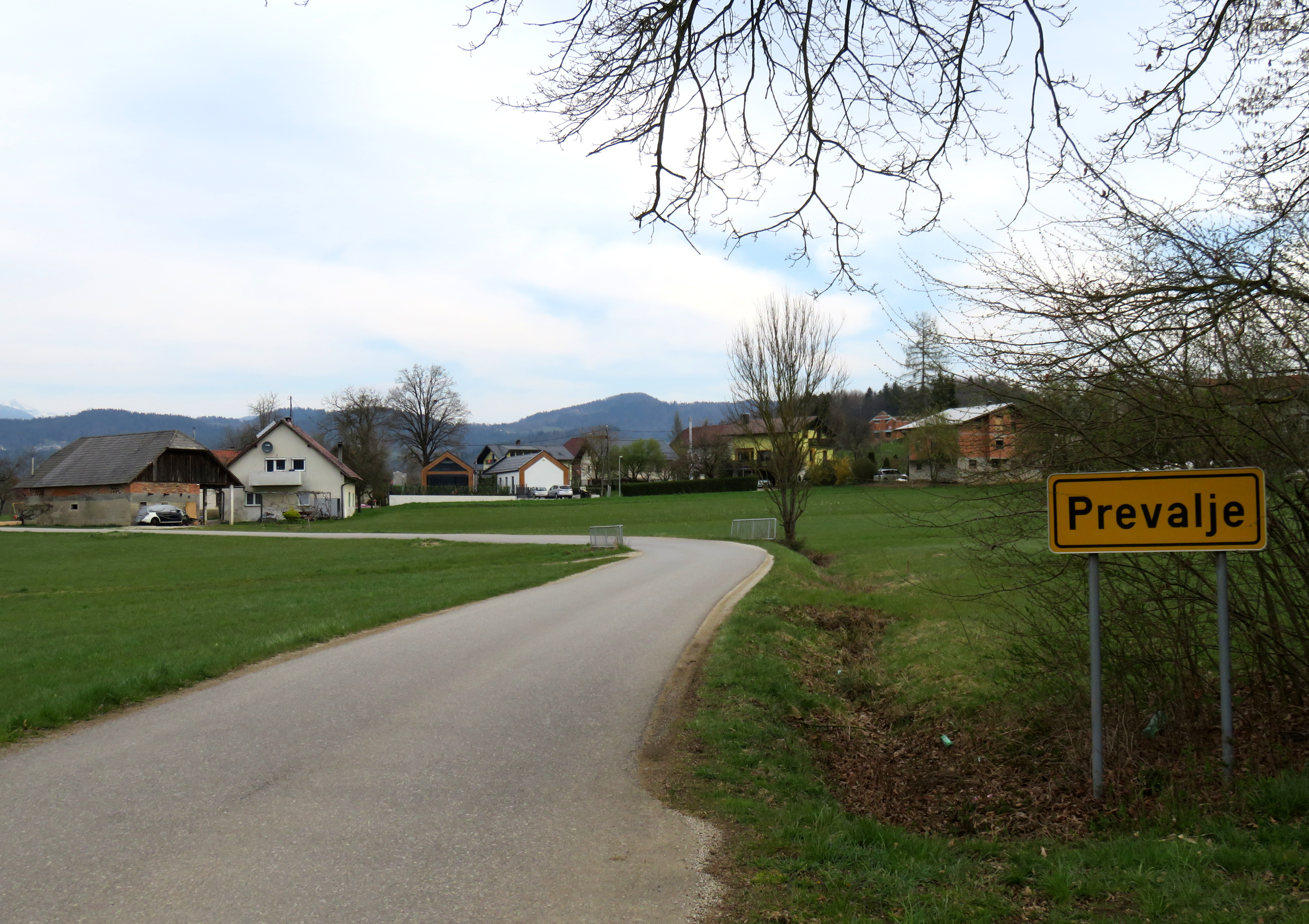

- Location in Slovenia
- Coordinates: 46°9′5.44″N 14°40′33.45″E
- Country: Slovenia
- Traditional region: Upper Carniola
- Statistical region: Central Slovenia
- Municipality: Lukovica

Area
  - Total: 0.4 km^{2} (0.15 sq mi)
- Elevation: 322.1 m (1,057 ft)

Population (2002)
  - Total: 57

Prevalje (pronounced [ˈpɾeːʋaljɛ]) is a settlement south of Šentvid pri Lukovici in the Municipality of Lukovica in the eastern part of the Upper Carniola region of Slovenia.
