= Prelesje, Gorenja Vas–Poljane =

Prelesje
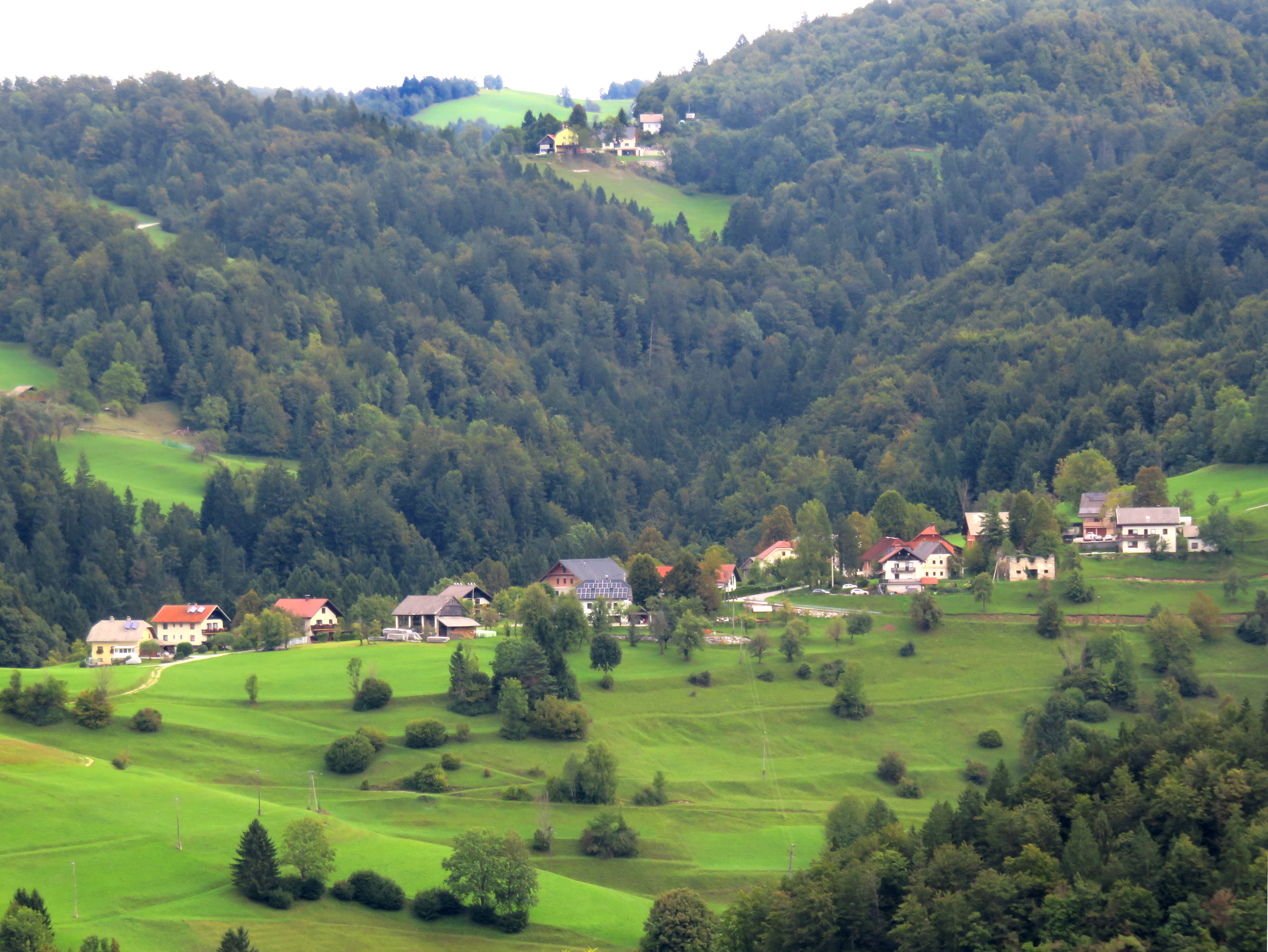

- Location in Slovenia
- Coordinates: 46°4′9.44″N 14°11′17.94″E
- Country: Slovenia
- Traditional region: Upper Carniola
- Statistical region: Upper Carniola
- Municipality: Gorenja Vas–Poljane

Area
  - Total: 1.16 km^{2} (0.45 sq mi)
- Elevation: 650.5 m (2,134 ft)

Population (2020)
  - Total: 74
  - Density: 64/km^{2} (170/sq mi)

Prelesje (pronounced [pɾɛˈleːsjɛ]) is a small settlement near the village of Lučine in the Municipality of Gorenja Vas–Poljane in the Upper Carniola region of Slovenia.

== Name ==
The name Prelesje is a fused prepositional phrase that has lost case inflection: pre(d) 'before, in front of' + lesje 'woods', referring to its location relative to forested land. Prelesje was attested in older sources as Prilezzi in 1291 and Prilessi in 1500, and the name was transcribed as Perleſsie on the Franciscan land survey of 1818–1828.

== Gallery ==
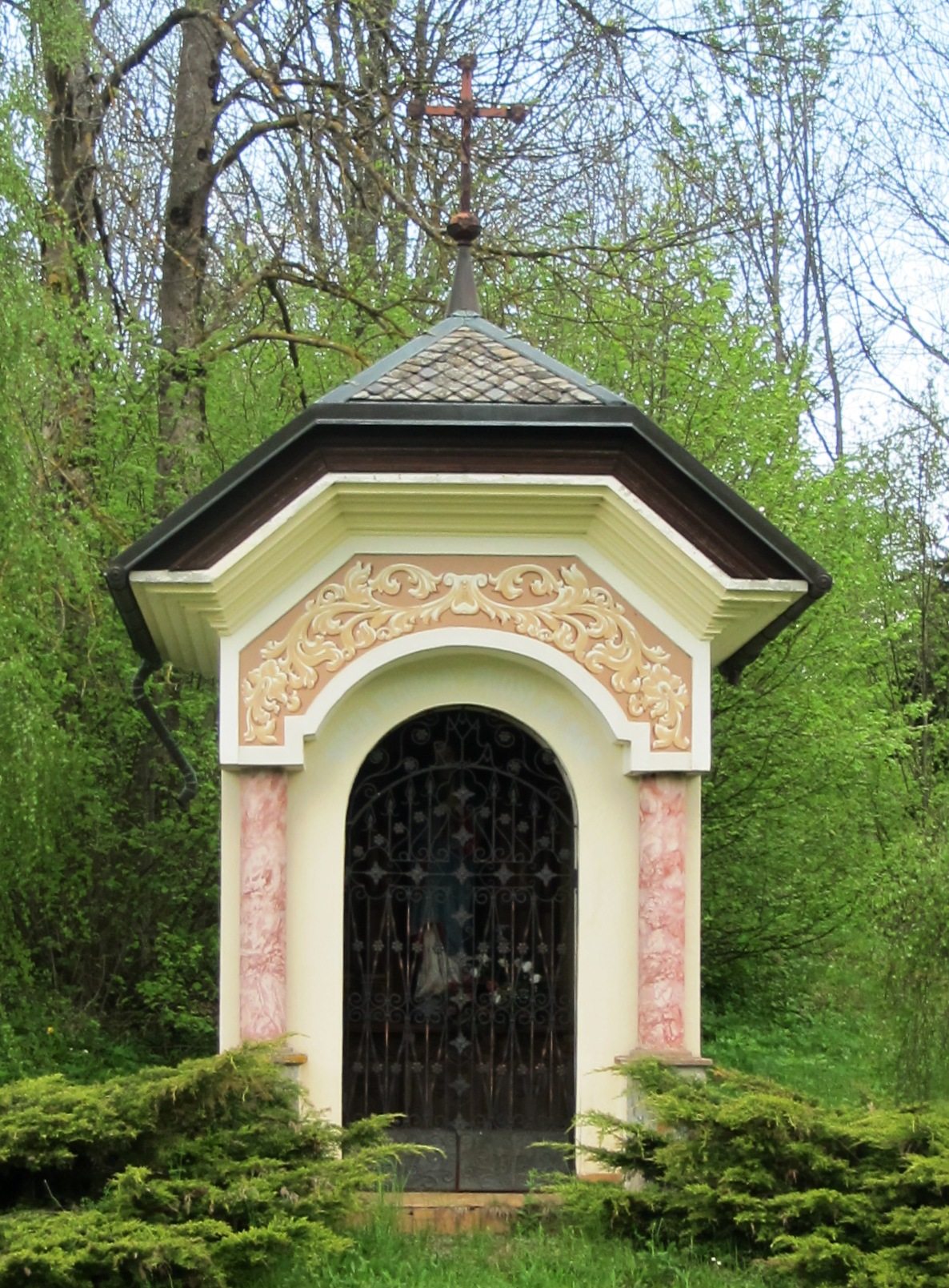
Wayside shrine south of the main part of Prelesje
