= Prilesje, Lukovica =

Prilesje
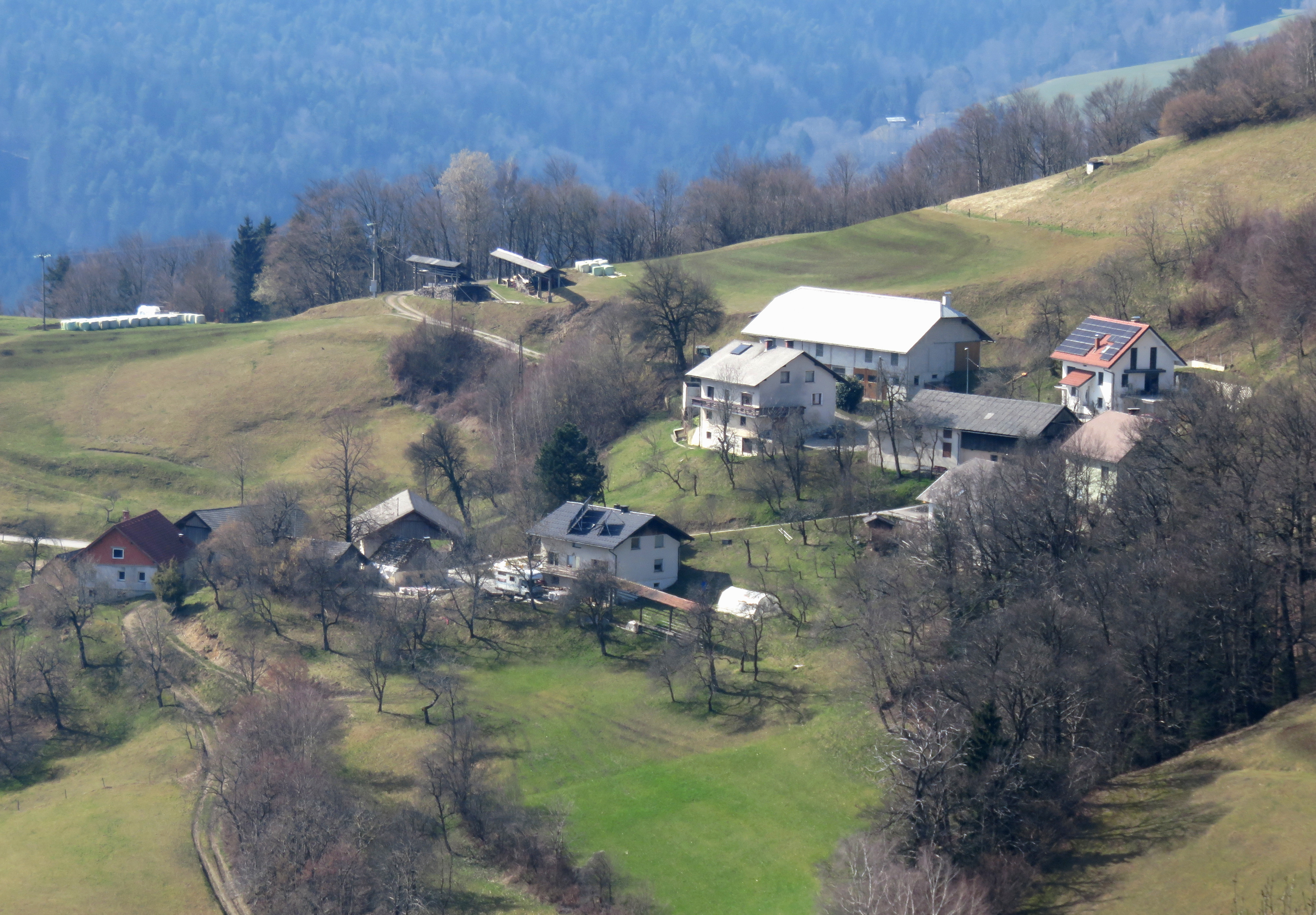

- Location in Slovenia
- Coordinates: 46°11′23.57″N 14°48′58.2″E
- Country: Slovenia
- Traditional region: Upper Carniola
- Statistical region: Central Slovenia
- Municipality: Lukovica

Area
  - Total: 0.34 km^{2} (0.13 sq mi)
- Elevation: 631.9 m (2,073 ft)

Population (2002)
  - Total: 15

Prilesje (pronounced [pɾiˈleːsjɛ]) is a small settlement in the hills above Blagovica in the Municipality of Lukovica in the eastern part of the Upper Carniola region of Slovenia.
