= Poreče, Vipava =

Poreče
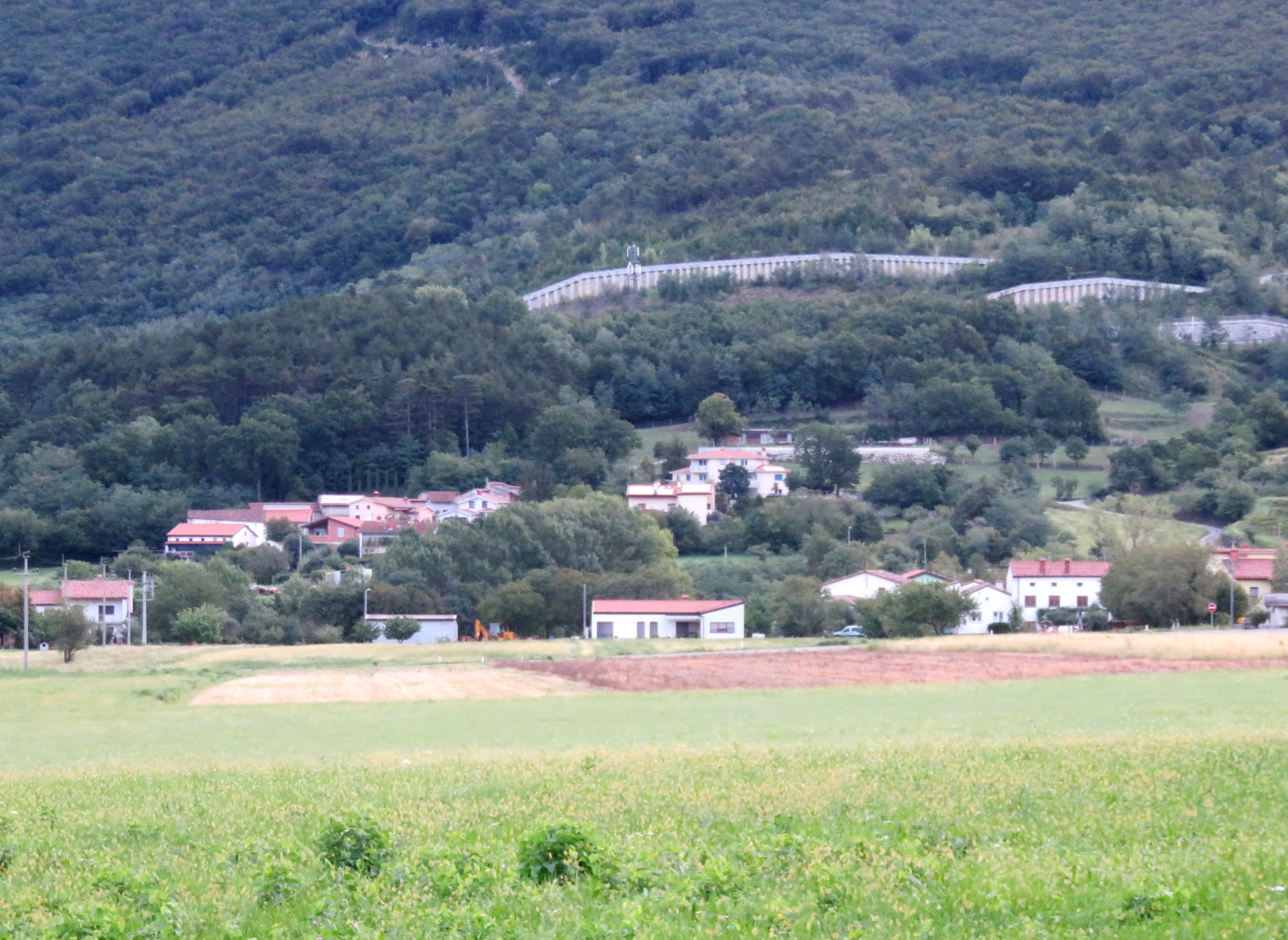

- Location in Slovenia
- Coordinates: 45°48′4.74″N 13°58′24.62″E
- Country: Slovenia
- Traditional region: Littoral
- Statistical region: Gorizia
- Municipality: Vipava

Area
  - Total: 5.42 km^{2} (2.09 sq mi)
- Elevation: 164.3 m (539 ft)

Population (2002)
  - Total: 113

Poreče (pronounced [pɔˈɾeːtʃɛ]) is a settlement in the upper Vipava Valley just north of Podnanos in the Municipality of Vipava in the Littoral region of Slovenia.
