= Ponikve, Brežice =

Ponikve
- Location in Slovenia
- Coordinates: 45°50′42.83″N 15°38′24″E
- Country: Slovenia
- Traditional region: Lower Carniola
- Statistical region: Lower Sava
- Municipality: Brežice

Area
  - Total: 5.24 km^{2} (2.02 sq mi)
- Elevation: 376.4 m (1,235 ft)

Population (2020)
  - Total: 104
  - Density: 19.8/km^{2} (51.4/sq mi)

Ponikve (pronounced [pɔˈniːkʋɛ]) is a settlement in the Municipality of Brežice in eastern Slovenia, close to the border with Croatia. The area is part of the traditional region of Lower Carniola. It is now included with the rest of the municipality in the Lower Sava Statistical Region.

== Name ==
The name Ponikve is a plural form derived from the word ponikva 'influent stream' or 'sinkhole' (into which such a stream disappears). In its plural form it refers to a gently rolling landscape consisting of the basins of an influent stream. Like other villages named Ponikve and similar names (e.g., Ponikva), it refers to a local landscape element.

== Church ==
The local church is dedicated to Saint James and belongs to the parish of Velika Dolina. It was built in the 17th century.
