= Prilesje, Velike Lašče =

Prilesje
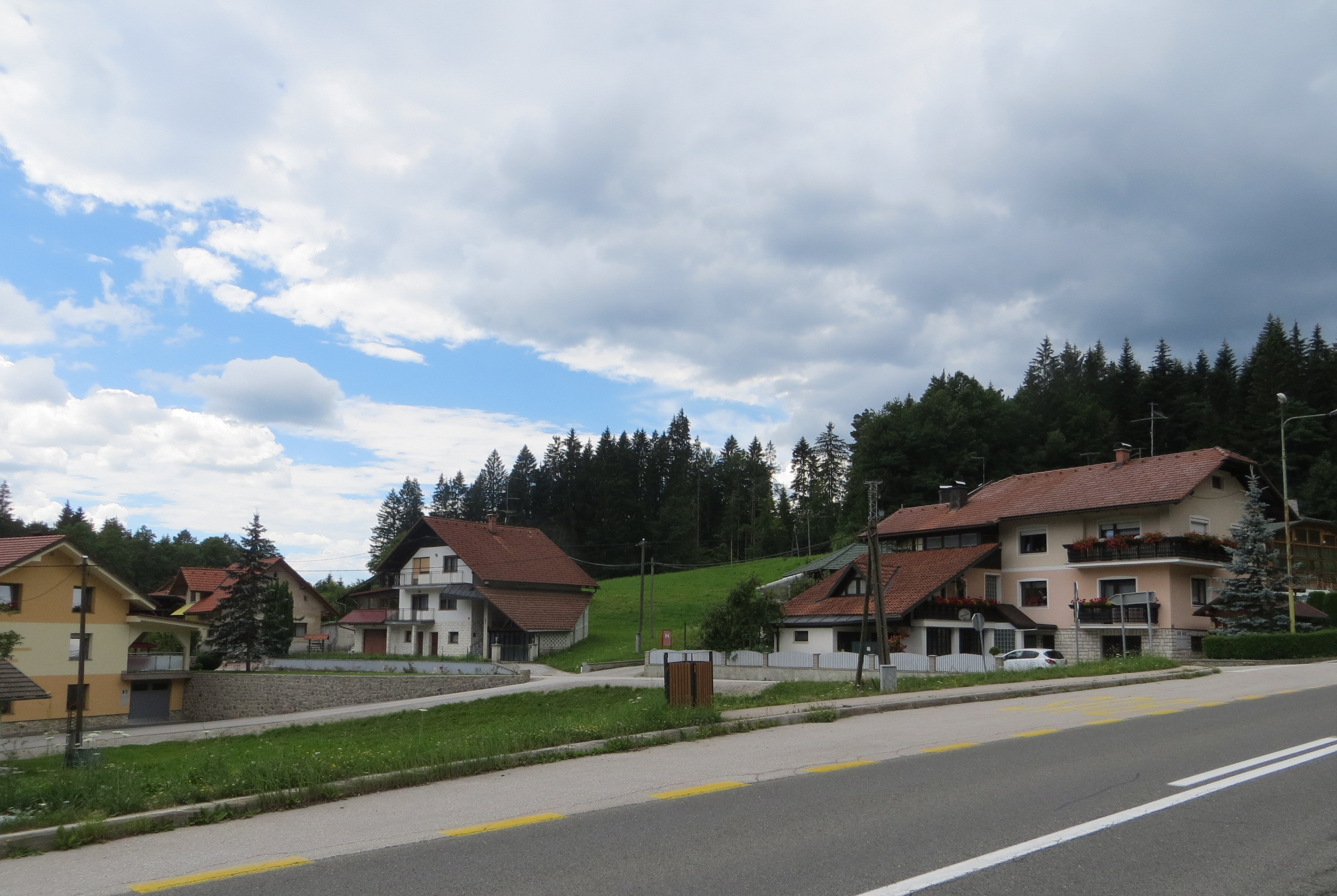

- Location in Slovenia
- Coordinates: 45°49′9.62″N 14°39′13.73″E
- Country: Slovenia
- Traditional region: Lower Carniola
- Statistical region: Central Slovenia
- Municipality: Velike Lašče

Area
  - Total: 3.3 km^{2} (1.3 sq mi)
- Elevation: 619.6 m (2,033 ft)

Population (2002)
  - Total: 64
- Postal code: 1315

Prilesje (pronounced [pɾiˈleːsjɛ]) is a small village southeast of Velike Lašče in central Slovenia. The railway line from Ljubljana to Kočevje runs through the settlement. The entire Municipality of Velike Lašče is part of the traditional region of Lower Carniola and is now included in the Central Slovenia Statistical Region.
