= Pece, Grosuplje =

Pece
- Village
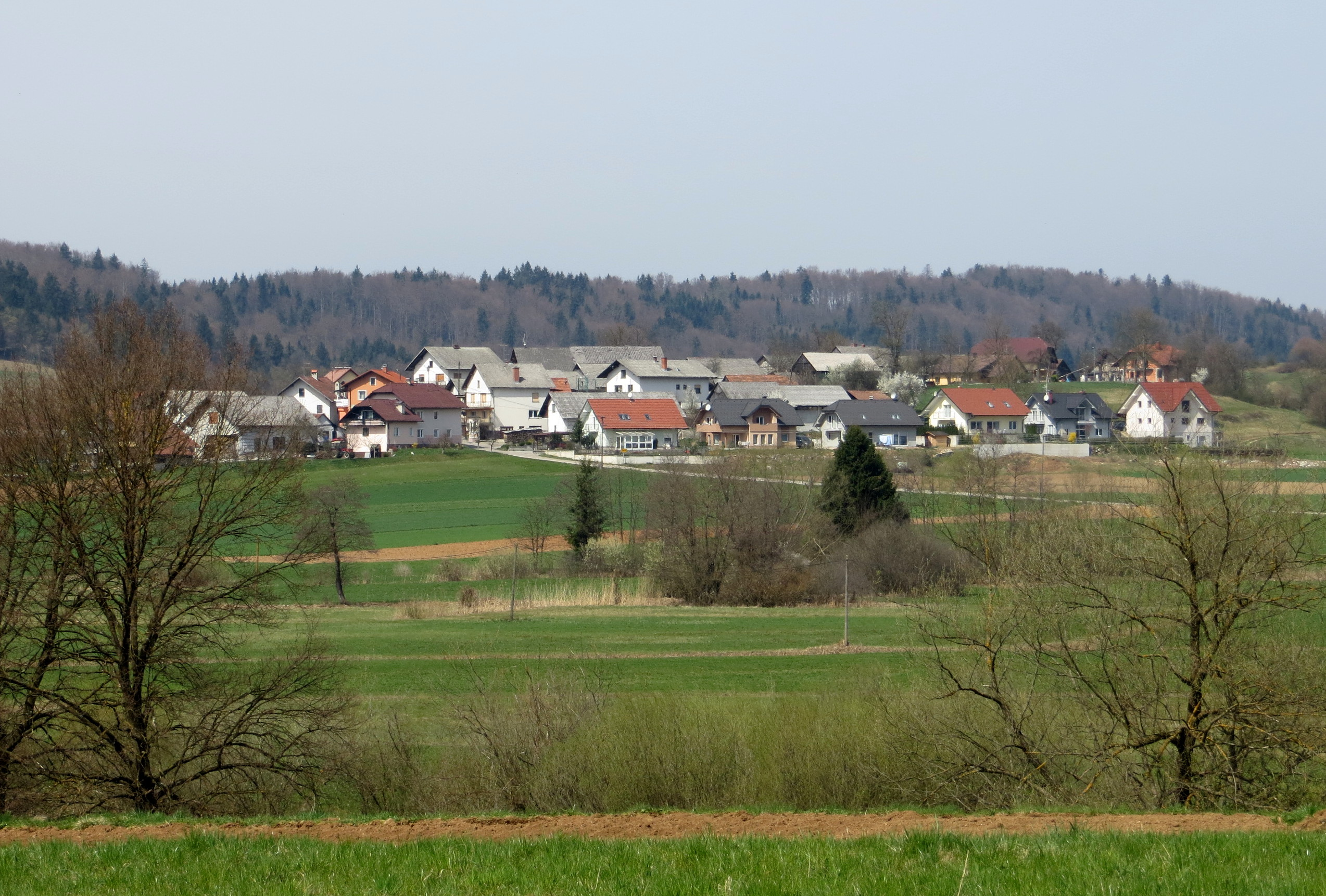

- Location in Slovenia
- Coordinates: 45°56′21.02″N 14°37′8.03″E
- Country: Slovenia
- Traditional region: Lower Carniola
- Statistical region: Central Slovenia
- Municipality: Grosuplje

Area
  - Total: 1.62 km^{2} (0.63 sq mi)
- Elevation: 352.7 m (1,157 ft)

Population (2018)
  - Total: 104

Pece (pronounced [ˈpeːtsɛ]) is a small village southwest of Grosuplje in central Slovenia. The area is part of the historical region of Lower Carniola. The municipality is now included in the Central Slovenia Statistical Region.

Evidence of an Iron Age hillfort has been found on Gorica Hill to the north of the settlement and remains of Roman buildings uncovered west of the village.

== Gallery ==
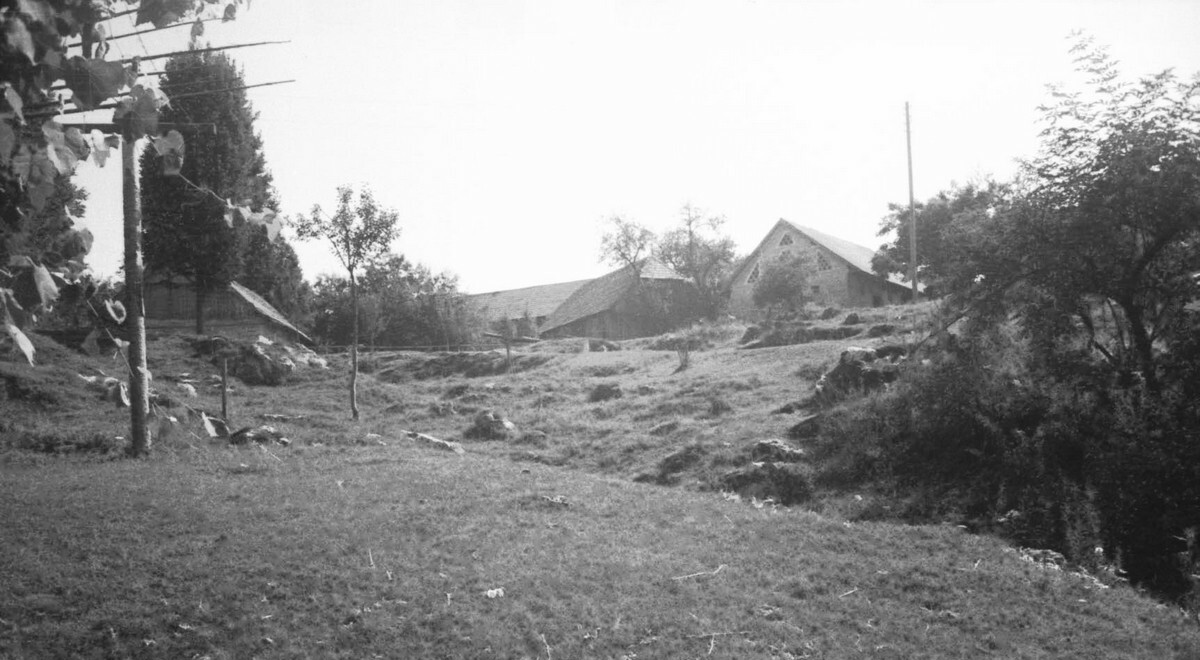
Pece in 1948
