= Planina, Ivančna Gorica =

Planina
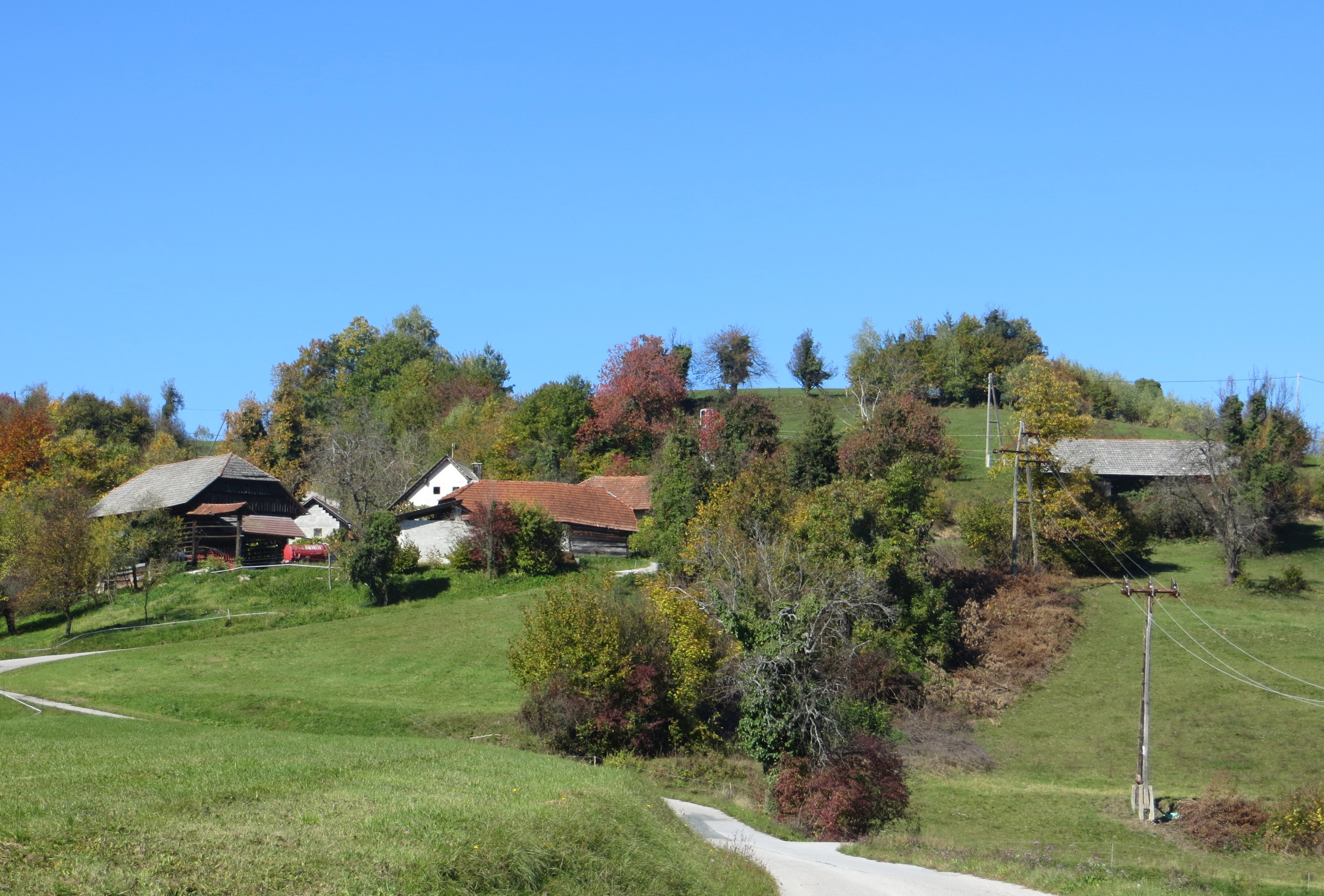

- Location in Slovenia
- Coordinates: 46°0′10.05″N 14°47′54.41″E
- Country: Slovenia
- Traditional region: Lower Carniola
- Statistical region: Central Slovenia
- Municipality: Ivančna Gorica

Area
  - Total: 0.58 km^{2} (0.22 sq mi)
- Elevation: 604.5 m (1,983 ft)

Population (2002)
  - Total: 9

Planina (pronounced [plaˈnìːna]) is a small settlement in the hills north of Stična in the Municipality of Ivančna Gorica in central Slovenia. The municipality is included in the Central Slovenia Statistical Region. The entire area is part of the historical region of Lower Carniola.
