= Potok, Trebnje =

Potok
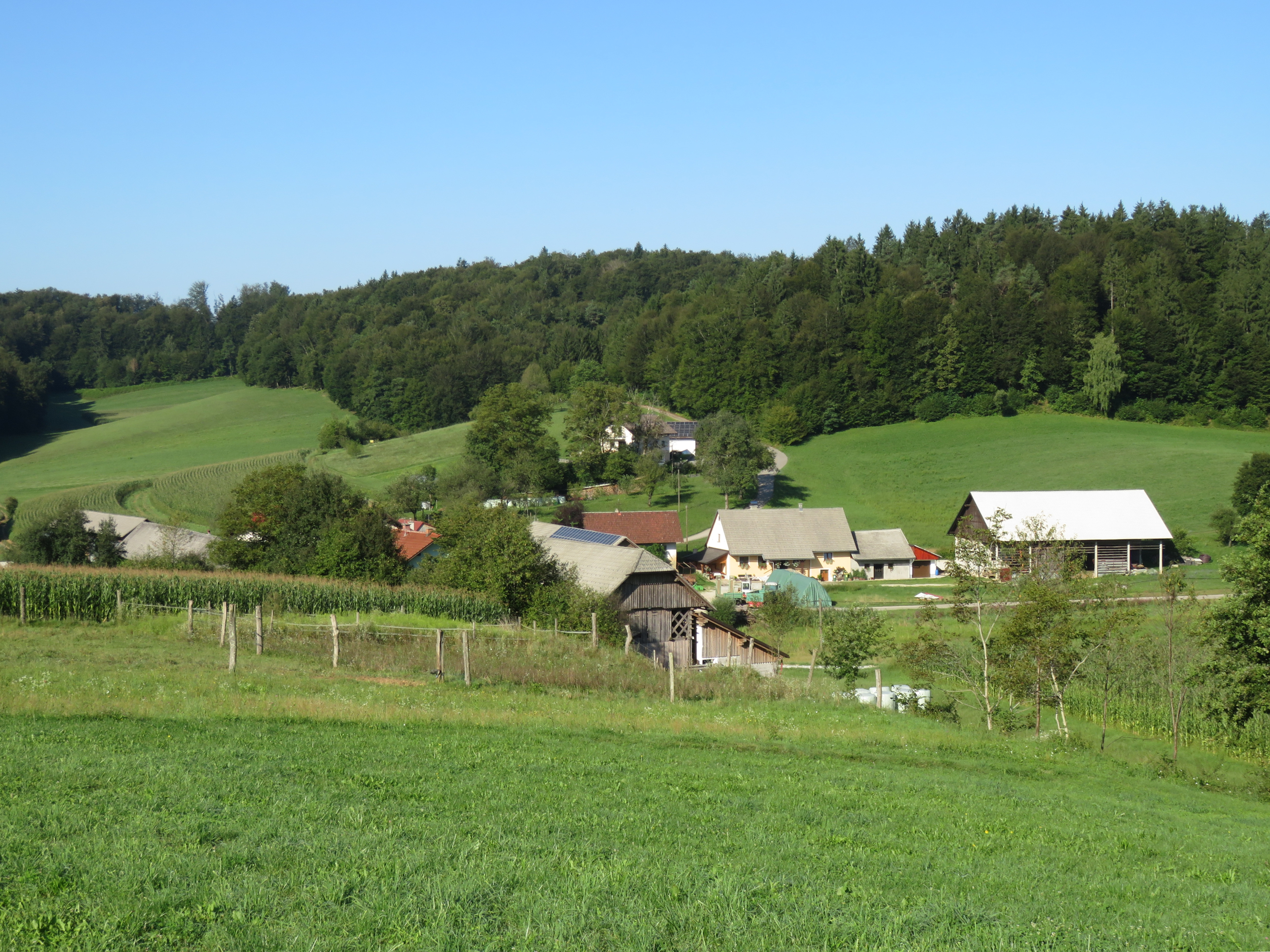

- Location in Slovenia
- Coordinates: 45°56′50.1″N 14°55′56.19″E
- Country: Slovenia
- Traditional region: Lower Carniola
- Statistical region: Southeast Slovenia
- Municipality: Trebnje

Area
  - Total: 0.61 km^{2} (0.24 sq mi)
- Elevation: 290.6 m (953 ft)

Population (2002)
  - Total: 75

Potok (pronounced [ˈpɔːtɔk]) is a small settlement northwest of Šentlovrenc in the Municipality of Trebnje in the traditional region of Lower Carniola in Slovenia. The municipality is now included in the Southeast Slovenia Statistical Region.

== Name ==
The name of the settlement literally means 'creek, stream'. Toponyms containing the element potok 'creek' are common in Slovenia. The village stands on the right bank of Potok Creek, a tributary of the Temenica River. Potok Creek is usually dry, but during heavy rain it is fed by Škavba Spring at Mačji Dol Cave (Marovška zijalka) and the water then flows south through the Mačji Dol Valley (Marovška dolina).
