= Pečice, Brežice =

Pečice
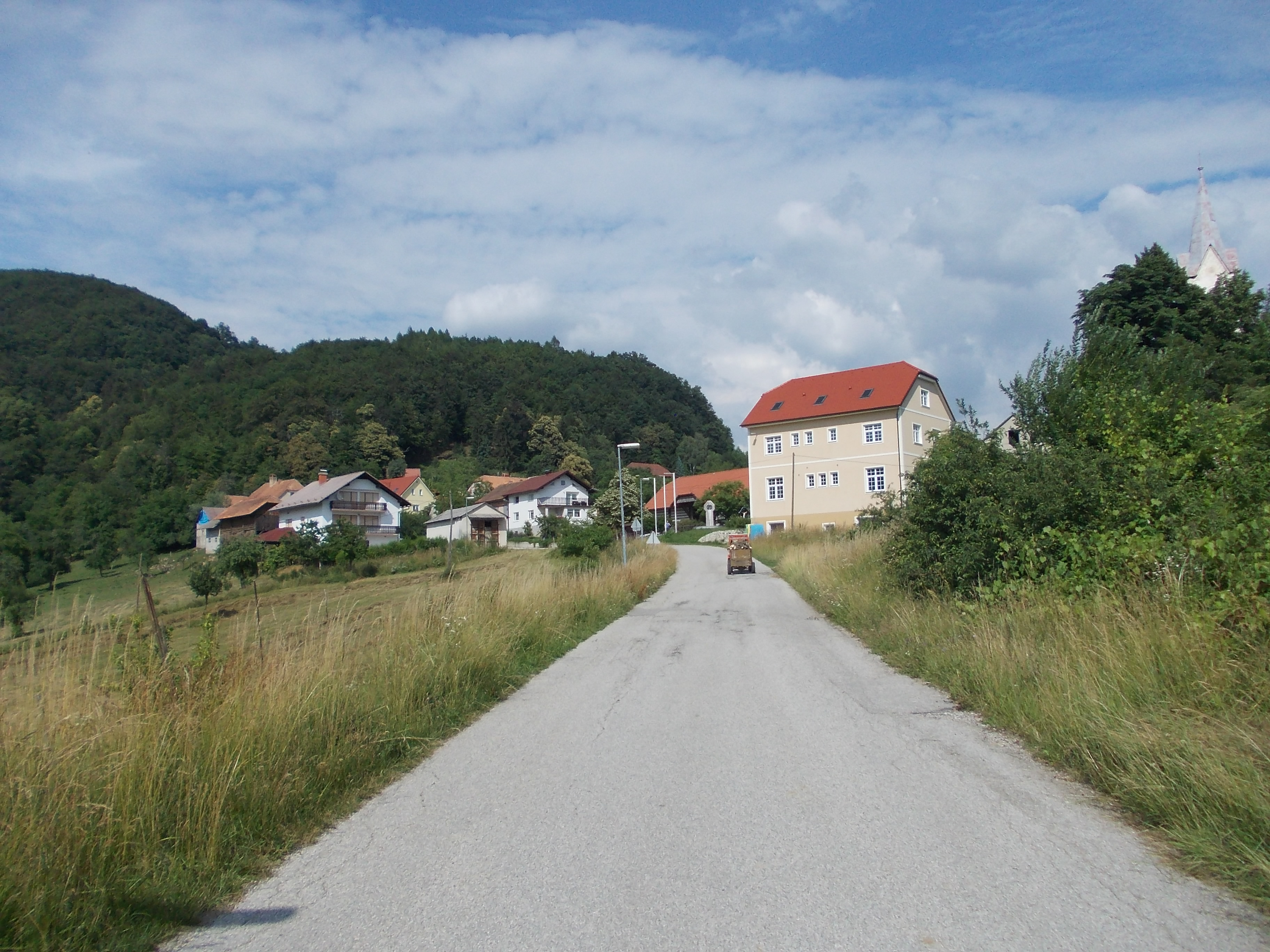
- Pečice, Brežice

- Location in Slovenia
- Coordinates: 46°0′46.5″N 15°34′43.64″E
- Country: Slovenia
- Traditional region: Styria
- Statistical region: Lower Sava
- Municipality: Brežice

Area
  - Total: 3.11 km^{2} (1.20 sq mi)
- Elevation: 421 m (1,381 ft)

Population (2020)
  - Total: 91
  - Density: 29/km^{2} (76/sq mi)

Pečice (pronounced [ˈpeːtʃitsɛ]) is a settlement in the Municipality of Brežice in eastern Slovenia. The area is part of the traditional region of Styria. It is now included with the rest of the municipality in the Lower Sava Statistical Region.

The local church in the settlement is dedicated to Saint Oswald (Slovene: sveti Ožbolt) and belongs to the Parish of Podsreda. It was built between 1857 and 1863 on the site of an older building.
