= Podlipa, Krško =

Podlipa
- Location in Slovenia
- Coordinates: 45°54′54.2″N 15°22′41.57″E
- Country: Slovenia
- Traditional region: Lower Carniola
- Statistical region: Lower Sava
- Municipality: Krško

Area
  - Total: 0.2 km^{2} (0.077 sq mi)
- Elevation: 210.9 m (692 ft)

Population (2002)
  - Total: 42
- Postal code: 8274

Podlipa (pronounced [pɔˈdliːpa]) is a small settlement south of Raka in the Municipality of Krško in eastern Slovenia. It is part of the traditional region of Lower Carniola and the Lower Sava Statistical Region.

== History ==
During the Second World War, in the fall of 1941, the German authorities evicted the residents of the village and settled Gottschee Germans in their homes. Water mains were installed in the village in 1971.
