= Praproče, Koper =

Praproče Prapozze
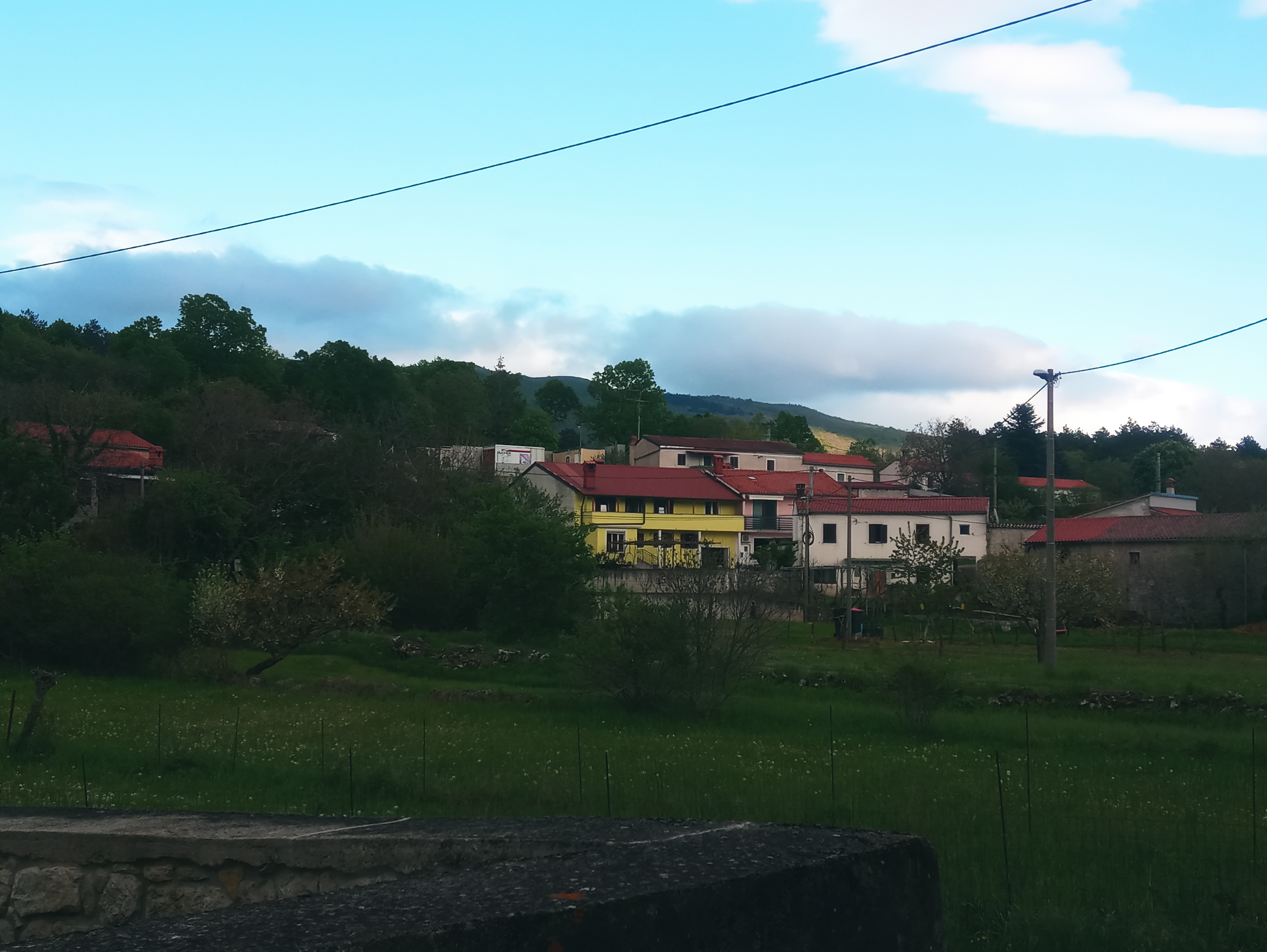
- Praproče in April 2025

- Location in Slovenia
- Coordinates: 45°31′51.99″N 13°54′57.4″E
- Country: Slovenia
- Traditional region: Littoral
- Statistical region: Coastal–Karst
- Municipality: Koper

Area
  - Total: 3.6 km^{2} (1.4 sq mi)
- Elevation: 416.3 m (1,366 ft)

Population (2002)
  - Total: 23

Praproče (pronounced [ˈpɾaːpɾɔtʃɛ]; Italian: Prapozze) is a small settlement in the City Municipality of Koper in the Littoral region of Slovenia.
