= Pečice, Litija =

Pečice
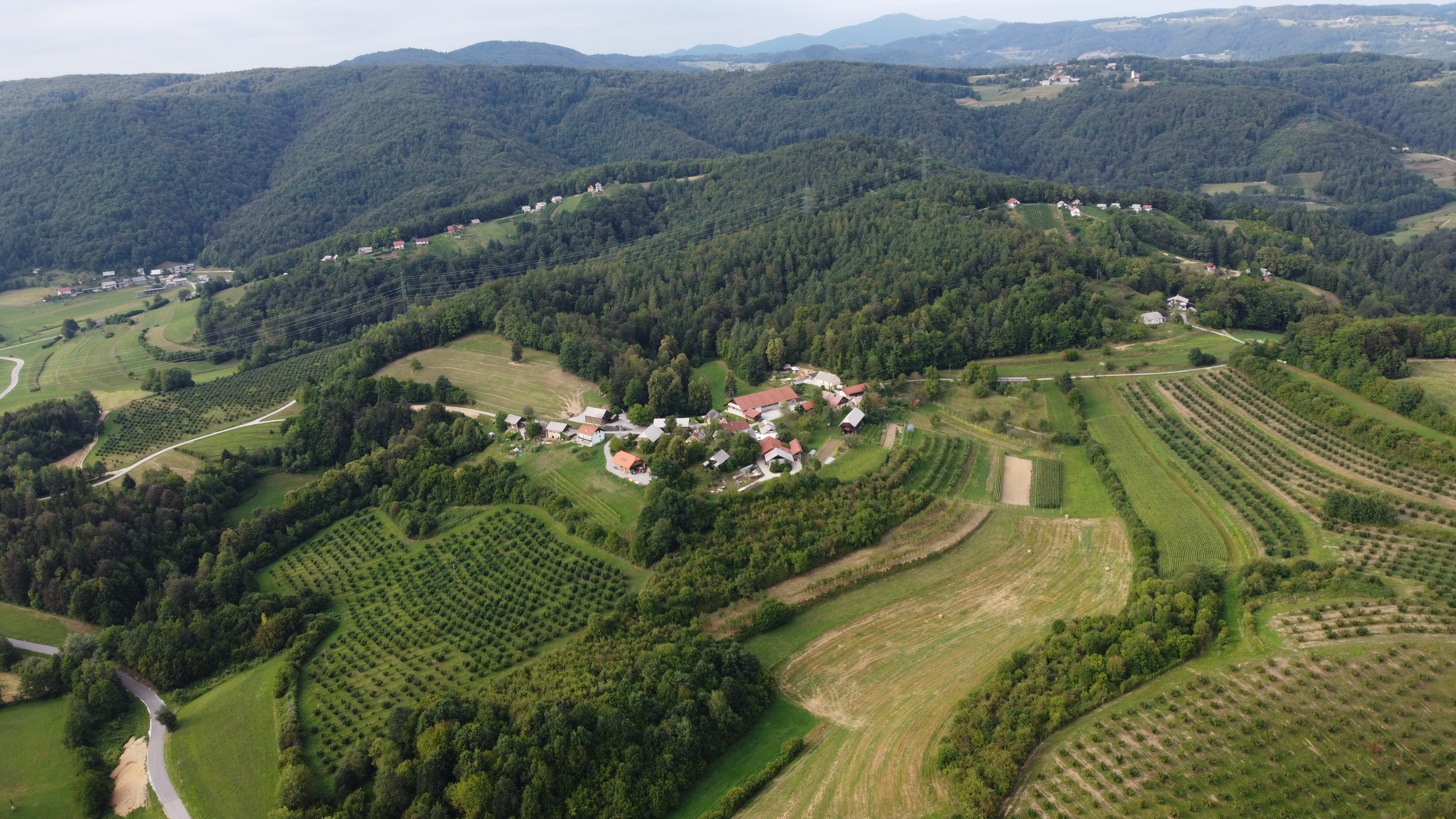

- Location in Slovenia
- Coordinates: 45°58′57.13″N 15°1′36.16″E
- Country: Slovenia
- Traditional region: Lower Carniola
- Statistical region: Central Sava
- Municipality: Litija

Area
  - Total: 0.83 km^{2} (0.32 sq mi)
- Elevation: 394.5 m (1,294 ft)

Population (2002)
  - Total: 28
- Postal code: 1274

Pečice (pronounced [pɛˈtʃiːtsɛ]) is a settlement southeast of Gabrovka in the Municipality of Litija in central Slovenia. The area is part of the traditional region of Lower Carniola. It is now included with the rest of the municipality in the Central Sava Statistical Region.
