= Potok, Kamnik =

Potok
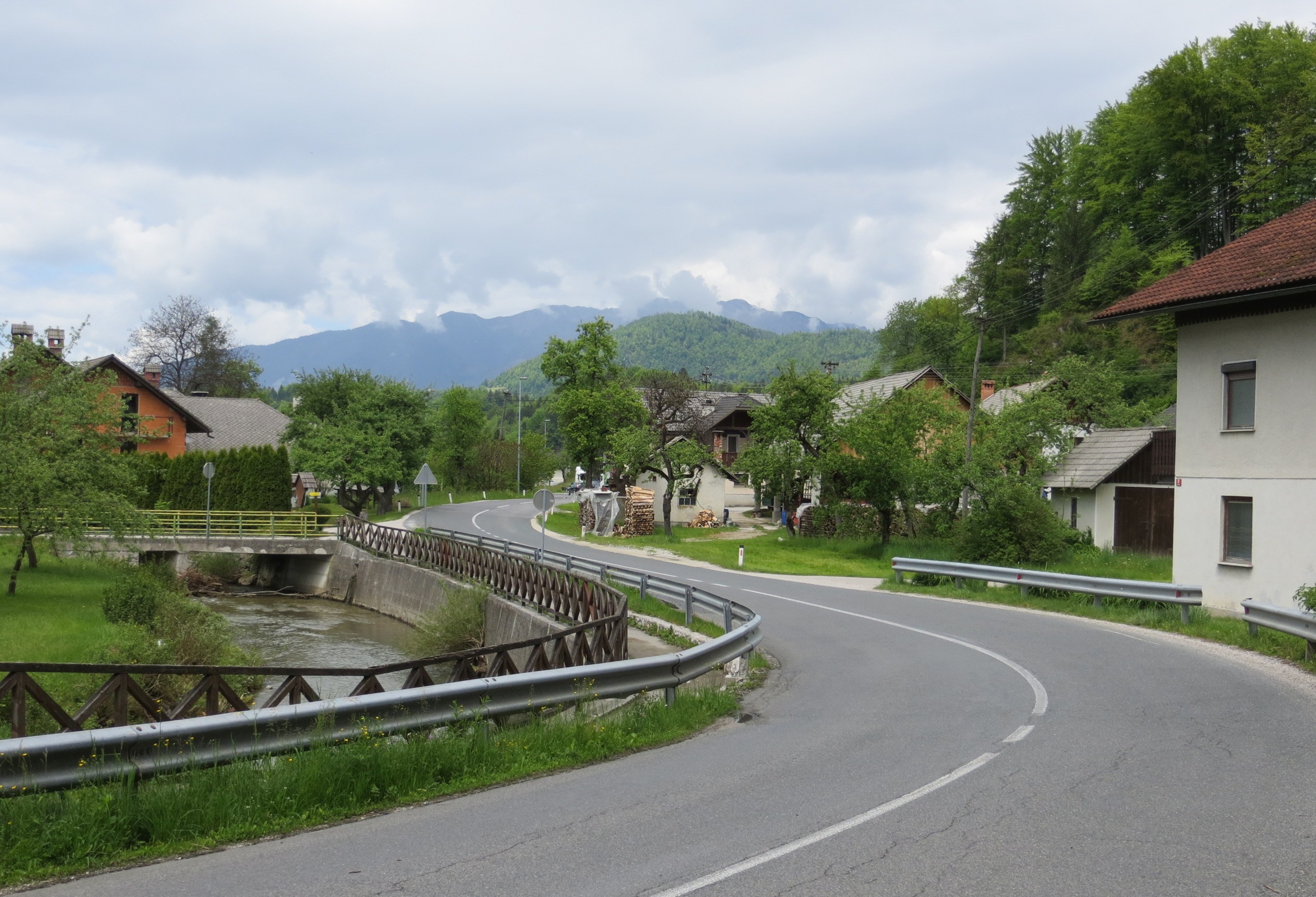

- Location in Slovenia
- Coordinates: 46°13′10.21″N 14°41′54.14″E
- Country: Slovenia
- Traditional region: Upper Carniola
- Statistical region: Central Slovenia
- Municipality: Kamnik

Area
  - Total: 0.42 km^{2} (0.16 sq mi)
- Elevation: 436.6 m (1,432 ft)

Population (2002)
  - Total: 71

Potok (pronounced [ˈpɔːtɔk]) is a small village in the Municipality of Kamnik in the Upper Carniola region of Slovenia, on the Nevljica River in the Tuhinj Valley.

== Name ==
The name of the settlement literally means 'creek, stream'. Snovišek Creek, a tributary of the Nevljica River, flows through the village.
