= Pobrežje, Črnomelj =

Pobrežje
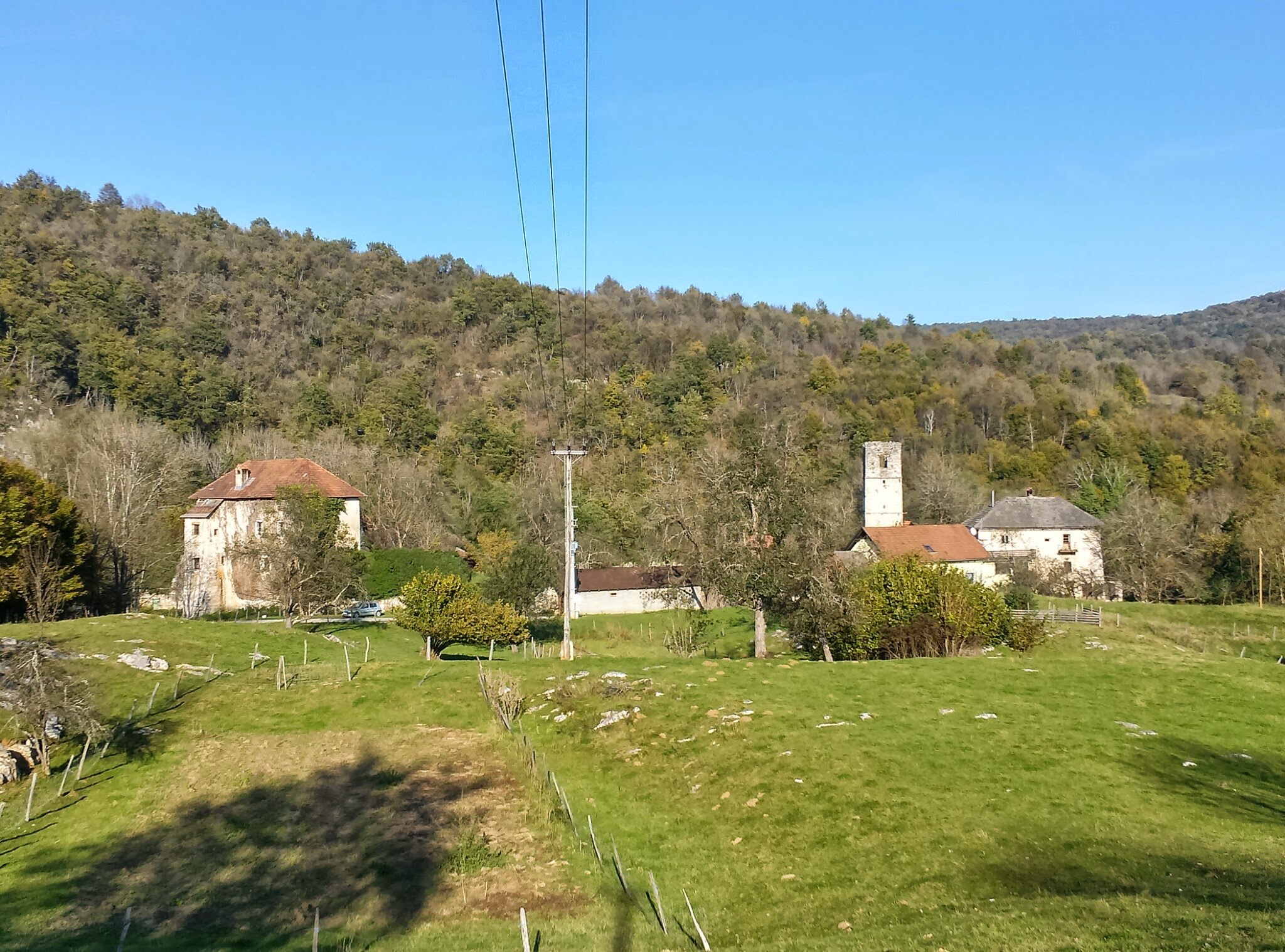

- Location in Slovenia
- Coordinates: 45°31′53.34″N 15°18′42.71″E
- Country: Slovenia
- Traditional region: White Carniola
- Statistical region: Southeast Slovenia
- Municipality: Črnomelj

Area
  - Total: 0.15 km^{2} (0.058 sq mi)
- Elevation: 169.4 m (556 ft)

Population (2020)
  - Total: 10
  - Density: 67/km^{2} (170/sq mi)
- Postal code: 8341

Pobrežje (pronounced [pɔˈbɾeːʒjɛ]; German: Freithurn) is a small settlement on the left bank of the Kolpa River north of Adlešiči in the Municipality of Črnomelj in the White Carniola area of southeastern Slovenia. The area is part of the traditional region of Lower Carniola and is now included in the Southeast Slovenia Statistical Region.

It is dominated by the ruins of an extensive 16th-century fort that was part of the defence system against Ottoman raids. It was burned down on 22 March 1945 by German and Ustaša forces.
