= Potoc =

- Location within Romania

Location
- Country: Romania
- Counties: Arad County
- Villages: Iercoșeni, Mânerău

Physical characteristics
- Mouth: Crișul Alb
  - location: Bocsig
  - coordinates: 46.4291°N 21.9515°E
- Length: 12 km (7.5 mi)
- Basin size: 29 km^{2} (11 sq mi)

Basin features
- Progression: Crișul Alb→ Körös→ Tisza→ Danube→ Black Sea

The Potoc is a left tributary of the river Crișul Alb in Romania. It flows into the Crișul Alb near Bocsig. Its length is 12 km (7.5 mi) and its basin size is 29 km^{2} (11 sq mi). Part of its flow is diverted into the Canalul Morilor, which flows parallel to the south of the Crișul Alb.
