= Pri Cerkvi–Struge =

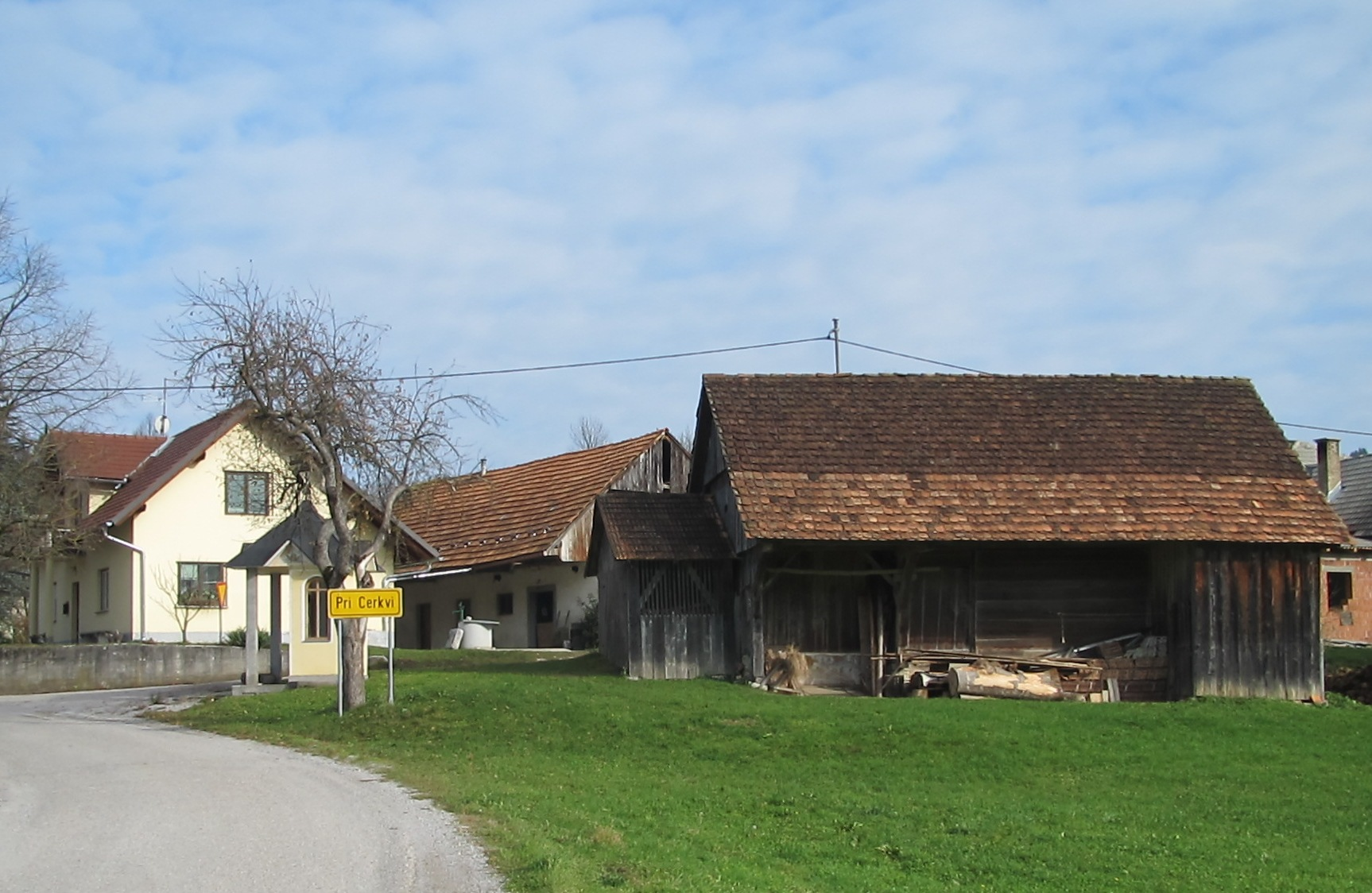

- Location in Slovenia
- Coordinates: 45°46′58.55″N 14°46′35.29″E
- Country: Slovenia
- Traditional region: Lower Carniola
- Statistical region: Central Slovenia
- Municipality: Dobrepolje

Area
  - Total: 3.2 km^{2} (1.2 sq mi)
- Elevation: 421.2 m (1,382 ft)

Population (2020)
  - Total: 66
  - Density: 21/km^{2} (53/sq mi)

Pri Cerkvi–Struge (pronounced [pɾi ˈtseːɾkʋi ˈstɾuːɡɛ]; Slovene: Pri Cerkvi - Struge, in older sources also Pricerkev and Pri cerkvi) is a village in the Municipality of Dobrepolje in Slovenia. The area is part of the historical region of Lower Carniola. The municipality is now included in the Central Slovenia Statistical Region.

== Name ==
Pri Cerkvi–Struge is a compound name; pri cerkvi means 'at the church' and refers to the parish church. Struge (German: Strug) is a regional designation referring to the entire southern part of the Dobrepolje karst polje, also including the villages of Četež pri Strugah, Kolenča Vas, Lipa, Podtabor, Potiskavec, Rapljevo, Tisovec, and Tržič. The name Struge literally means 'river channels' (from the Slovene common noun struga) and is a relatively frequent element in place names.

== Church ==
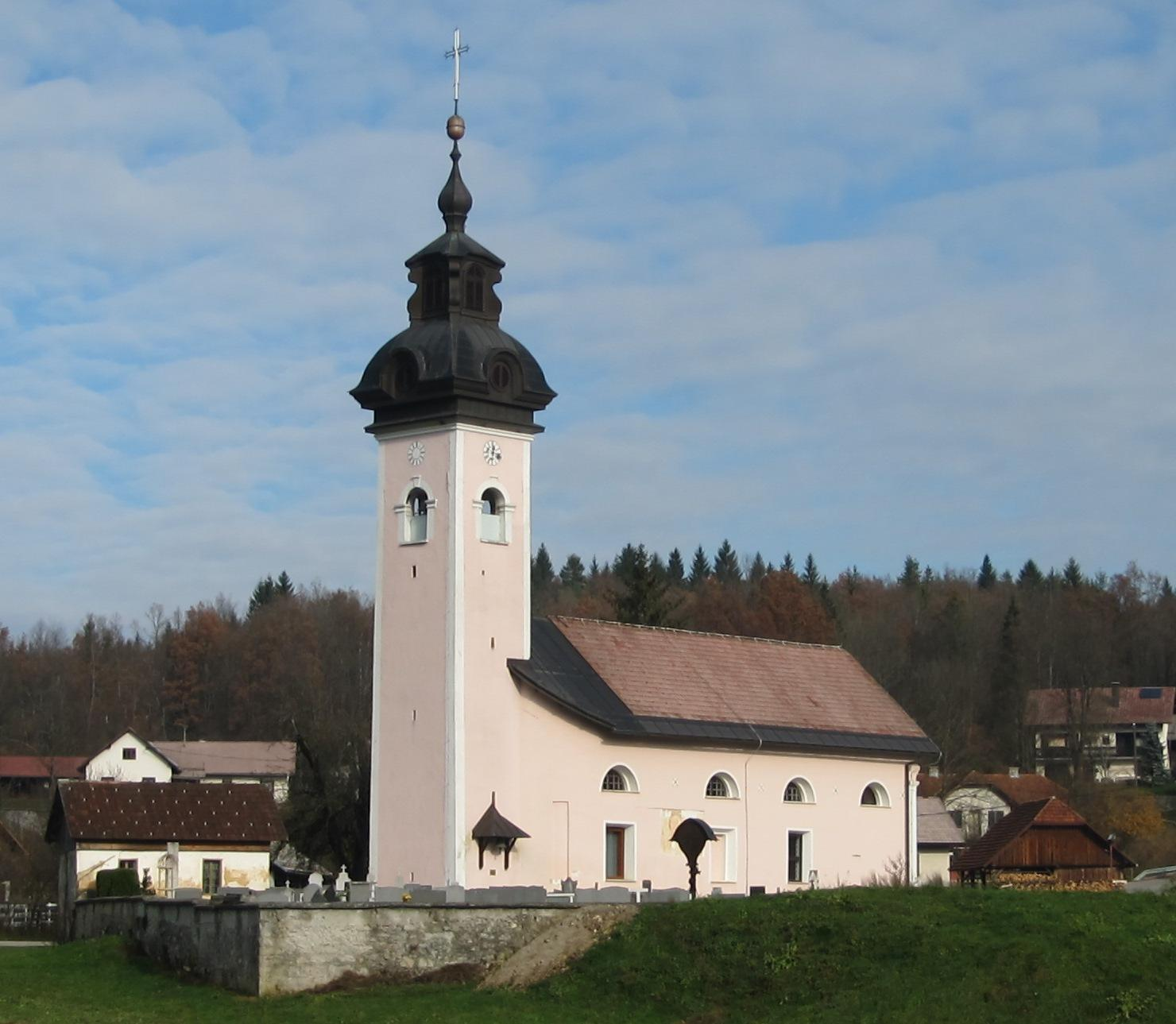
Saint Augustine's Church

The local parish church is dedicated to Saint Augustine and belongs to the Roman Catholic Archdiocese of Ljubljana. It is a medieval church that was extensively rebuilt in the mid-19th century.

== History ==
During the Second World War, a number of civilians from Pri Cerkvi–Struge were murdered on 28 July 1942 and buried in the Žiglovica Cave Mass Grave (Slovene: Grobišče Jama Žiglovica) in Ribnica.

== Gallery ==
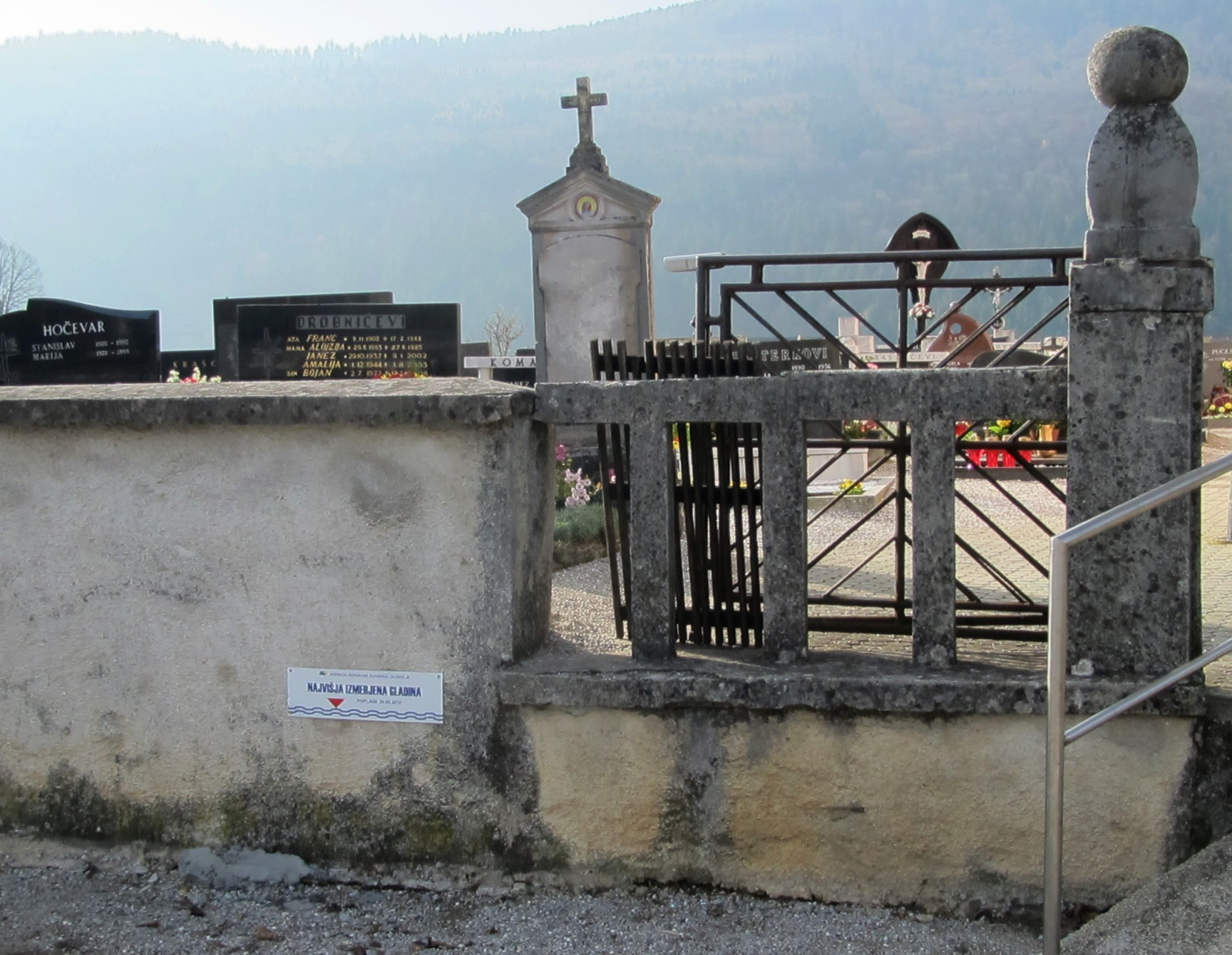
2010 high-water mark

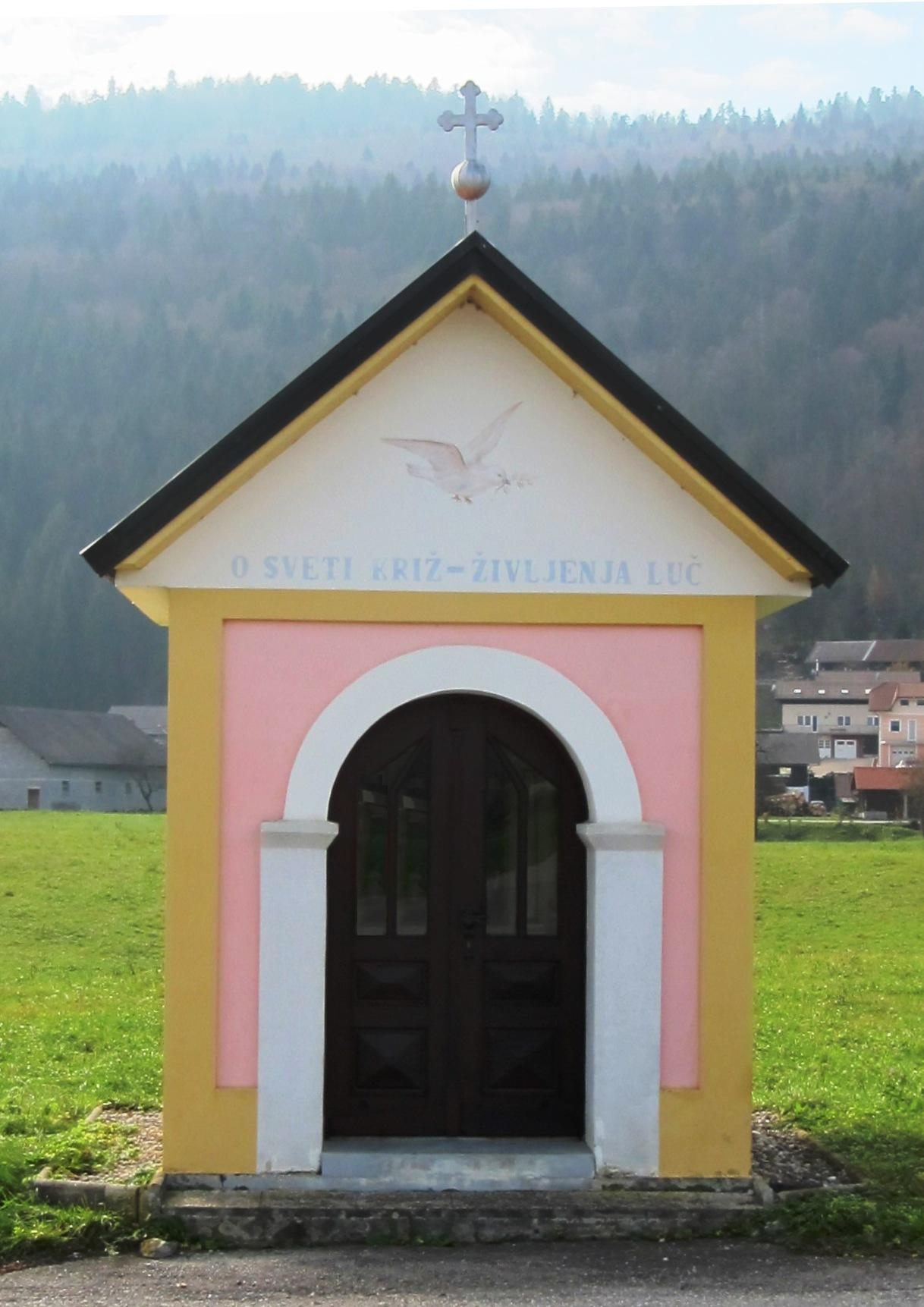
Chapel-shrine
