= Kukovo =

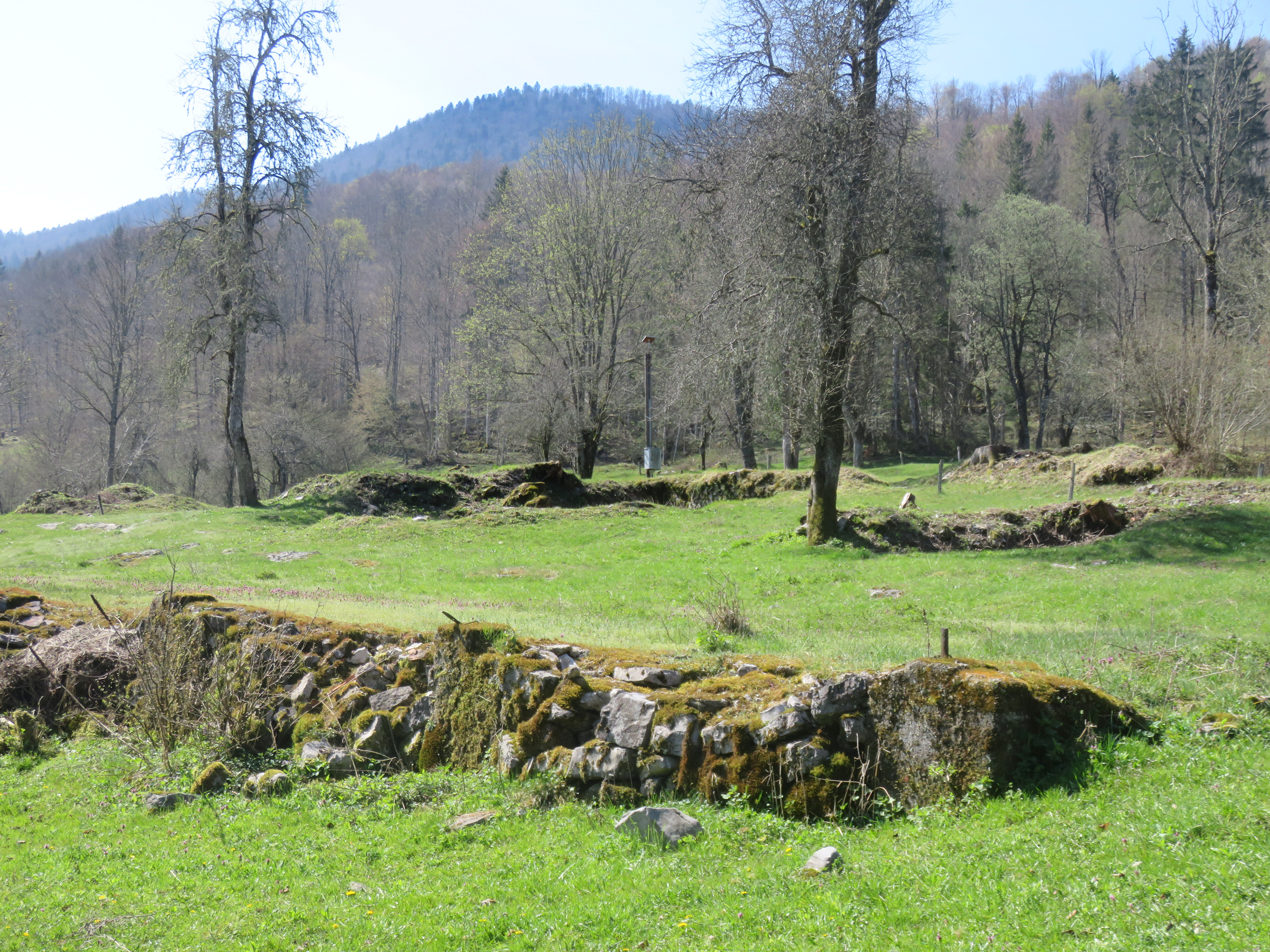

- Location in Slovenia
- Coordinates: 45°44′50.3″N 14°49′17.66″E
- Country: Slovenia
- Traditional region: Lower Carniola
- Statistical region: Central Slovenia
- Municipality: Dobrepolje
- Elevation: 478.6 m (1,570 ft)

Population (2002)
  - Total: 0

Kukovo (pronounced [ˈkuːkɔʋɔ]; in older sources also Kuka vas, German: Kukendorf, Gottscheerish: Kukndoarf) is a remote abandoned settlement in the Municipality of Dobrepolje in southern Slovenia. The area is part of the traditional region of Lower Carniola and is now included in the Central Slovenia Statistical Region. Its territory is now part of the village of Rapljevo.

== Name ==
The Slovene name Kukovo (and German Kukendorf) are of uncertain origin. One theory derives the name from kuk or kovk 'hill'. Other theories derive the name from the surname Kuk or relate the name to the cuckoo.

== History ==
Kukovo was a Gottschee German village. It is believed to have been founded relatively late because it was not mentioned in the land registry of 1574 or in the 1770 census. There are four caves southwest of the village on the slope of Black Peak (Slovene: Črni vrh), known in Gottscheerish as Pichlöch, Löckakkhərlöch, Meschnalöch, and Frauengrotte; the last served as a place of refuge for women and children from the village during Ottoman attacks. The settlement attained its maximum population in 1900, with 128 residents. Kukovo had 18 houses before the Second World War and a population of 74. At that time, the economy of the village was based on agriculture, selling firewood and railroad ties, and gathering berries. The residents of the village were evicted between 27 and 30 November 1941. Kukovo was burned by Italian troops in the summer of 1942 during the Rog Offensive and was never restored.

== Church ==
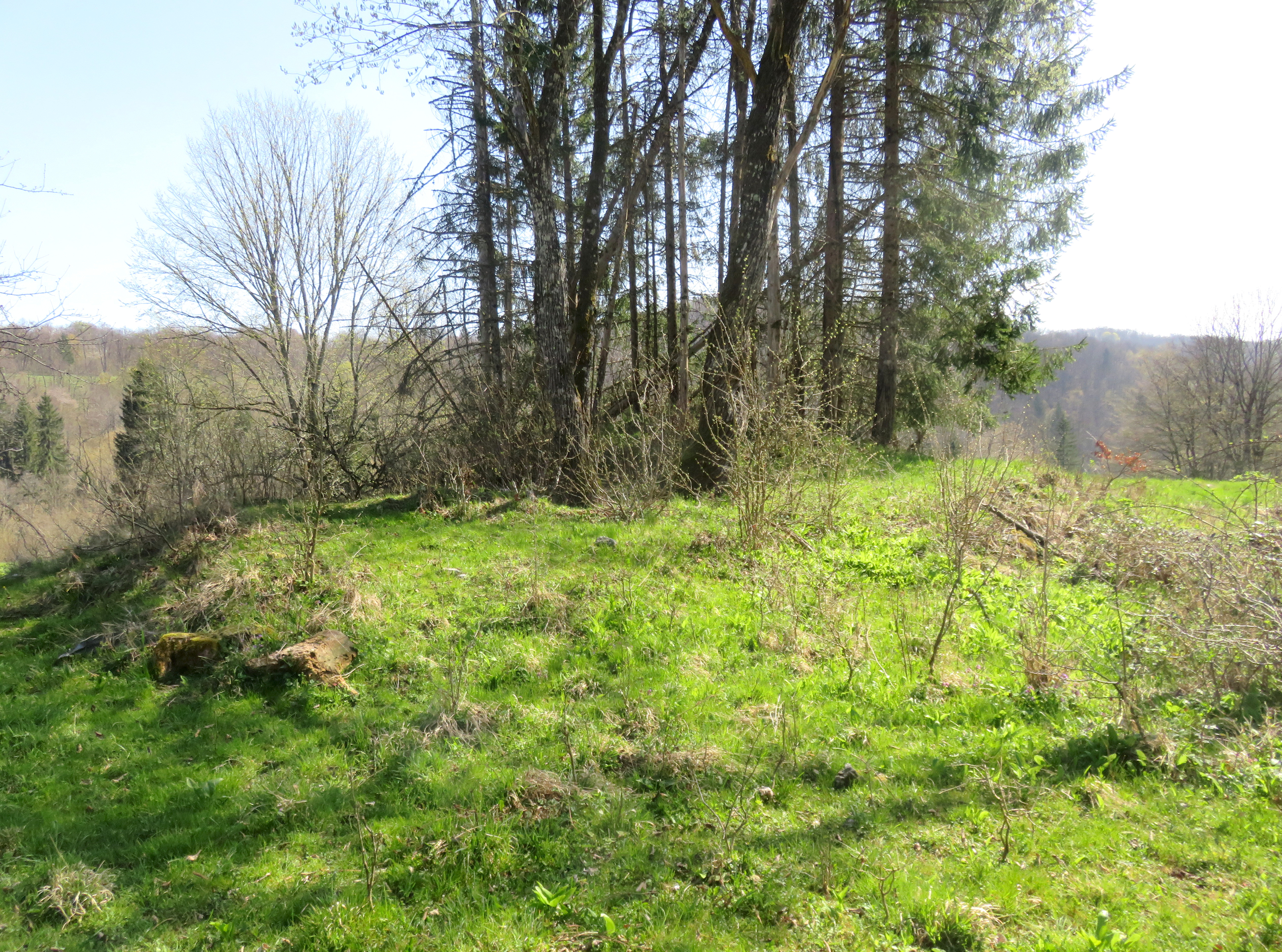
Site of Saint Anthony of Padua Church

The village church was a chapel of ease dedicated to Saint Anthony of Padua. It stood until March 1980 and was one of the last churches in the Gottschee area to be destroyed during the communist era. The church dated from the early 19th century. The church's statue of Saint Anthony of Padua is now located at Saint Agnes' Church in Seč and its two bronze bells, dating from the mid-19th century, are at Saints Primus and Felician's Church in Ratje. The church was nationalized in 1954 and used as a barn. Lack of maintenance caused the roof to collapse under the weight of snow in February 1969. In 1980 the Kočevje collective farm transferred to structure to a private individual in Struge, and in 1981 the building stones of the church were burned to produce quicklime.

== Notable people ==
Notable people that were born or lived in Kukovo include:

- Erwald Gliebe (1914–2011), honorary member of the Gottschee Memorial Association (Verein Gottscheer Gedenkstätte)
- Franz Gliebe (1875–?), mayor of Polom and mayor of Stari Log
- Josef Gliebe (1873–1960), parish priest at Gotenica decorated for service in the Second World War
