= Kompolje, Dobrepolje =

Kompolje
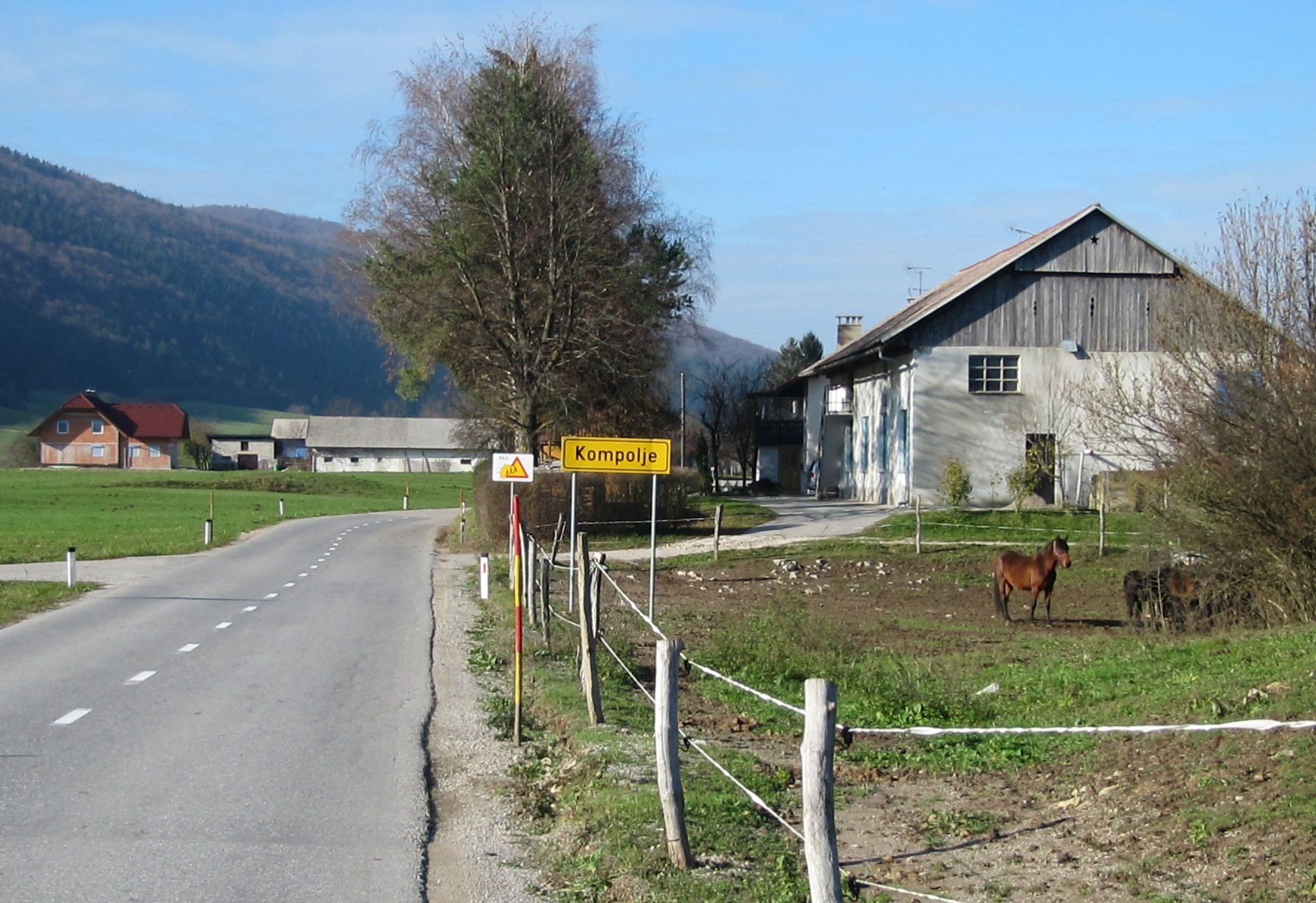

- Location in Slovenia
- Coordinates: 45°49′3.11″N 14°42′57.99″E
- Country: Slovenia
- Traditional region: Lower Carniola
- Statistical region: Central Slovenia
- Municipality: Dobrepolje

Area
  - Total: 12.04 km^{2} (4.65 sq mi)
- Elevation: 429.3 m (1,408 ft)

Population (2020)
  - Total: 498
  - Density: 41.4/km^{2} (107/sq mi)

Kompolje (pronounced [ˈkoːmpɔljɛ]; German: Kompole) is a village in the Municipality of Dobrepolje in Slovenia. The area is part of the historical region of Lower Carniola. The municipality is now included in the Central Slovenia Statistical Region. The village includes the hamlet of Brezje south of the main settlement.

== Geography ==
Kompolje lies in the middle of the Dobrepolje karst field. South of the village is Kompolje Cave (Slovene: Kompoljska jama), also known as Žovkno Cave. It is the source of a large stream that soon disappears into the ground, and in the past people from villages in the region would travel up to three hours to obtain water from it during droughts. The Rupe Sinkholes lie southeast of Kompolje and water from Dolaja Cave (Slovene: Dolaja jama) flows into them. In the past the locals would catch olms in Dolaja Cave and sell them in Ljubljana and Vienna.

== Name ==
Kompolje was first attested in written sources in 1280 as Gompol (and as Choempoel in 1342 and Gumpell in 1444). The name is derived from Slavic *komъ poľa 'raised part of a field'. Other, less likely, theories derived the name from Romance campulus 'small field' or Slavic *kъn poľu 'to the field'. In the past the German name was Kompole.

== Church ==
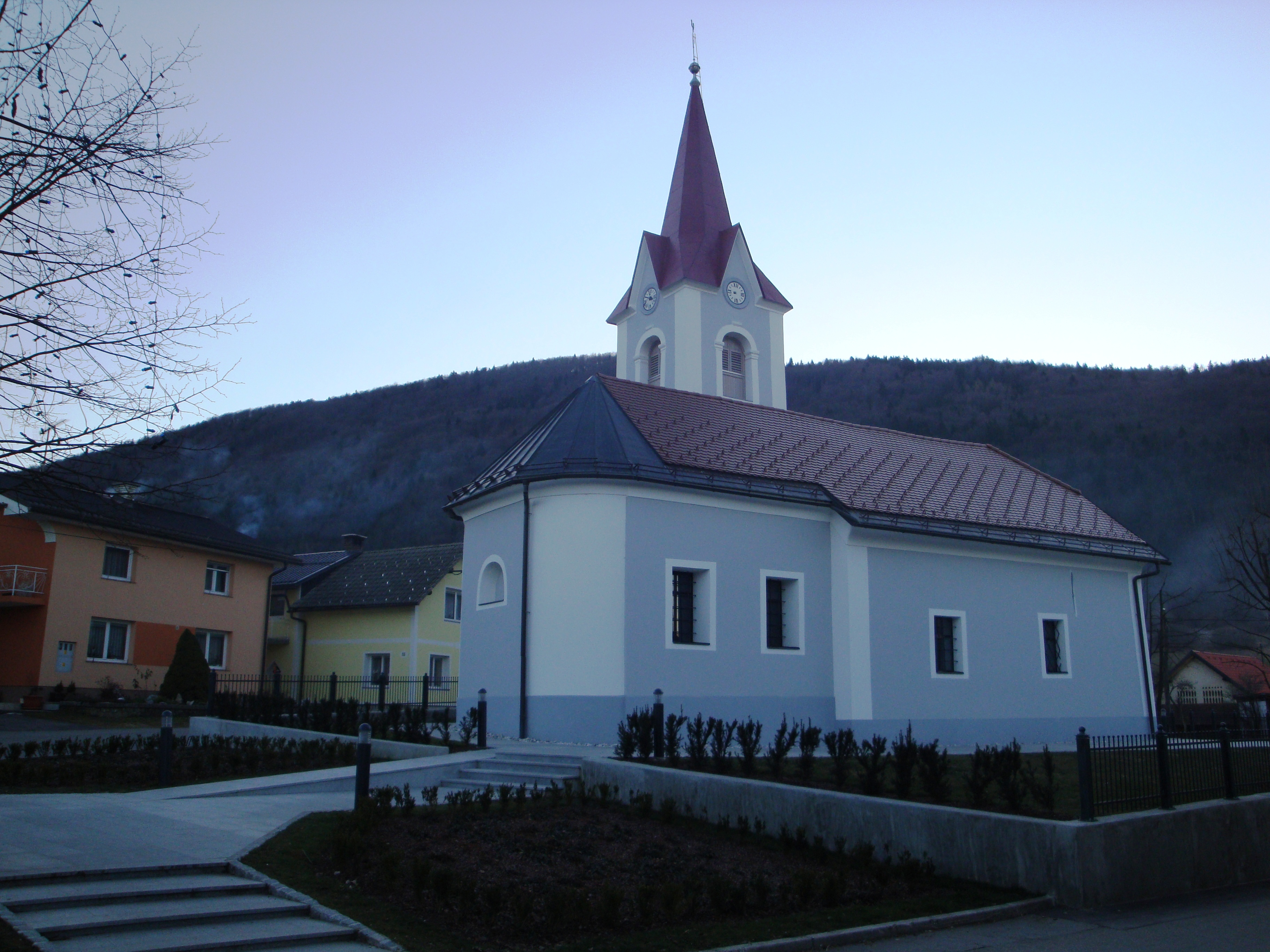
Saint Vitus' Church

The local church is dedicated to Saint Vitus (Slovene: sveti Vid) and belongs to the Parish of Dobrepolje–Videm. It was originally a 14th-century church that burned down in 1877 and was rebuilt in the late 19th century using material from the razed iron ore foundry in Ponikve. The church was first mentioned in written sources in 1526.

== Notable people ==
Notable people that were born or lived in Kompolje include:

- Štefan Adamič (born 1926), pathological physiology expert
- Anton Hren (1880–1936), write of juvenile literature
- Fran Samec (1884–1945), write of educational literature

== Gallery ==
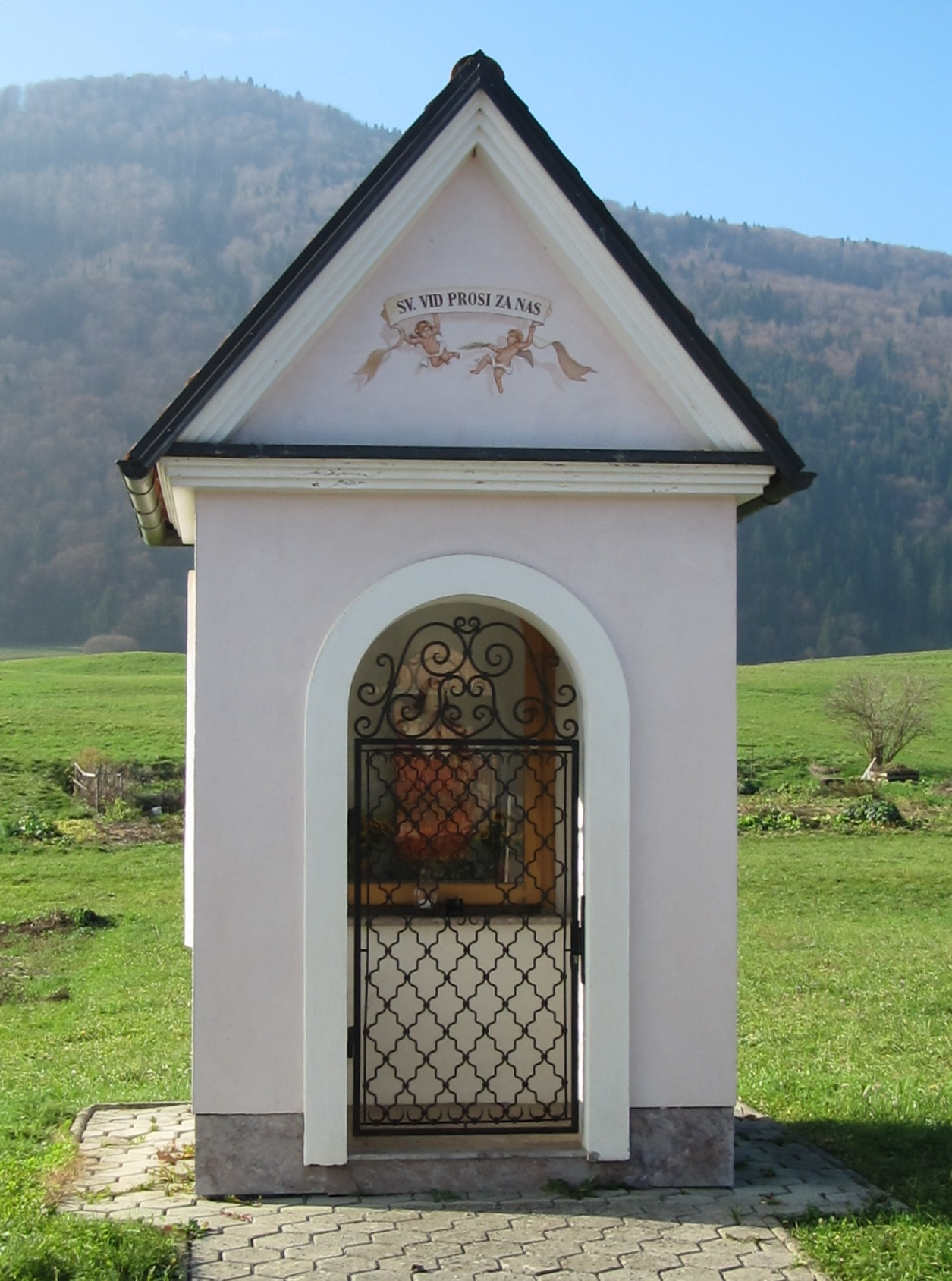
Chapel-shrine in Kompolje
