= Tisovec, Dobrepolje =

Tisovec
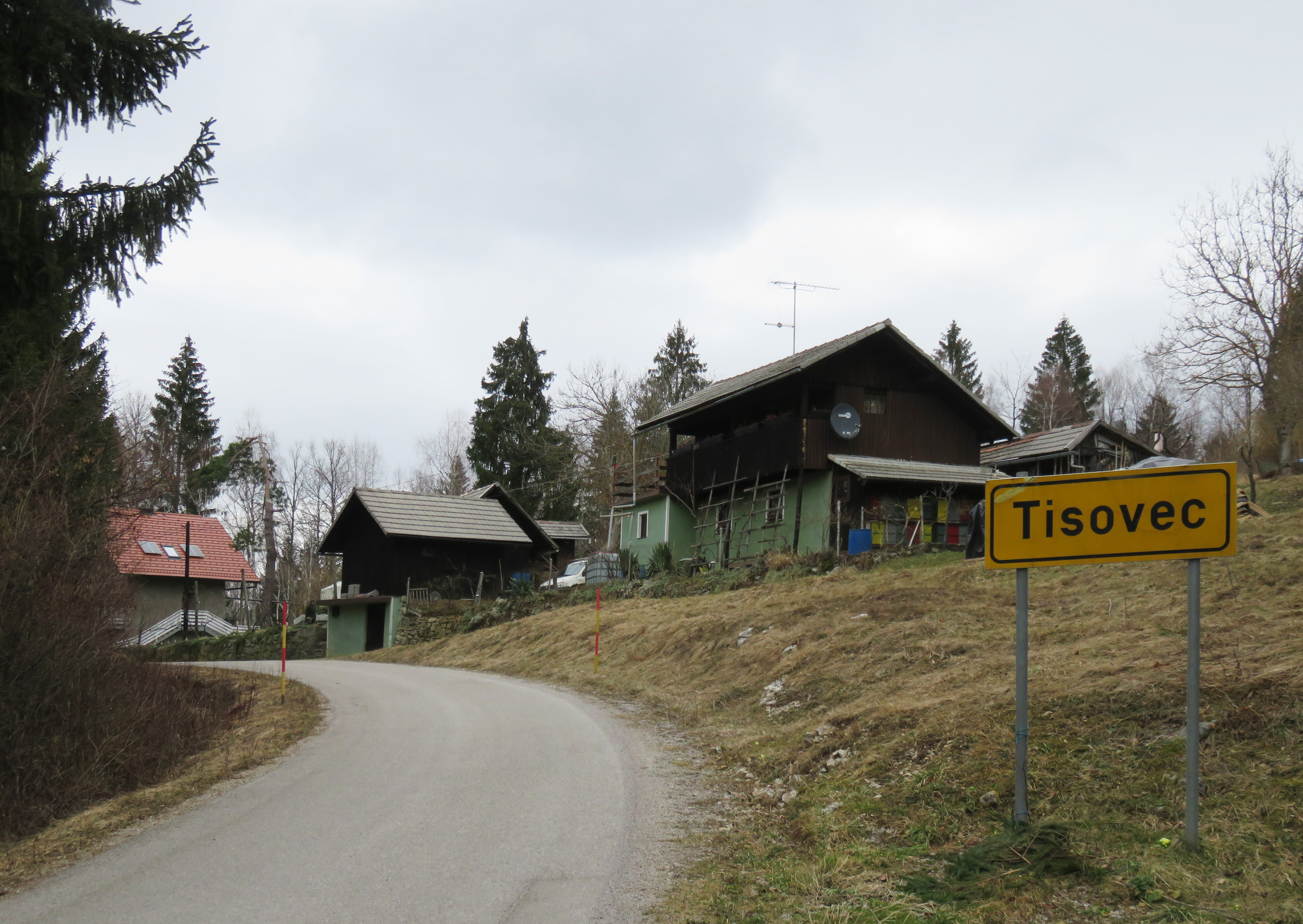

- Location in Slovenia
- Coordinates: 45°49′6.13″N 14°46′9.77″E
- Country: Slovenia
- Traditional region: Lower Carniola
- Statistical region: Central Slovenia
- Municipality: Dobrepolje

Area
  - Total: 4.62 km^{2} (1.78 sq mi)
- Elevation: 569.8 m (1,869 ft)

Population (2020)
  - Total: 45
  - Density: 9.7/km^{2} (25/sq mi)

Tisovec (pronounced [ˈtiːsɔʋəts]) is a small village in the Municipality of Dobrepolje in Slovenia. It lies in the hills northeast of Četež pri Strugah. The area is part of the historical region of Lower Carniola. The municipality is now included in the Central Slovenia Statistical Region.

== Church ==
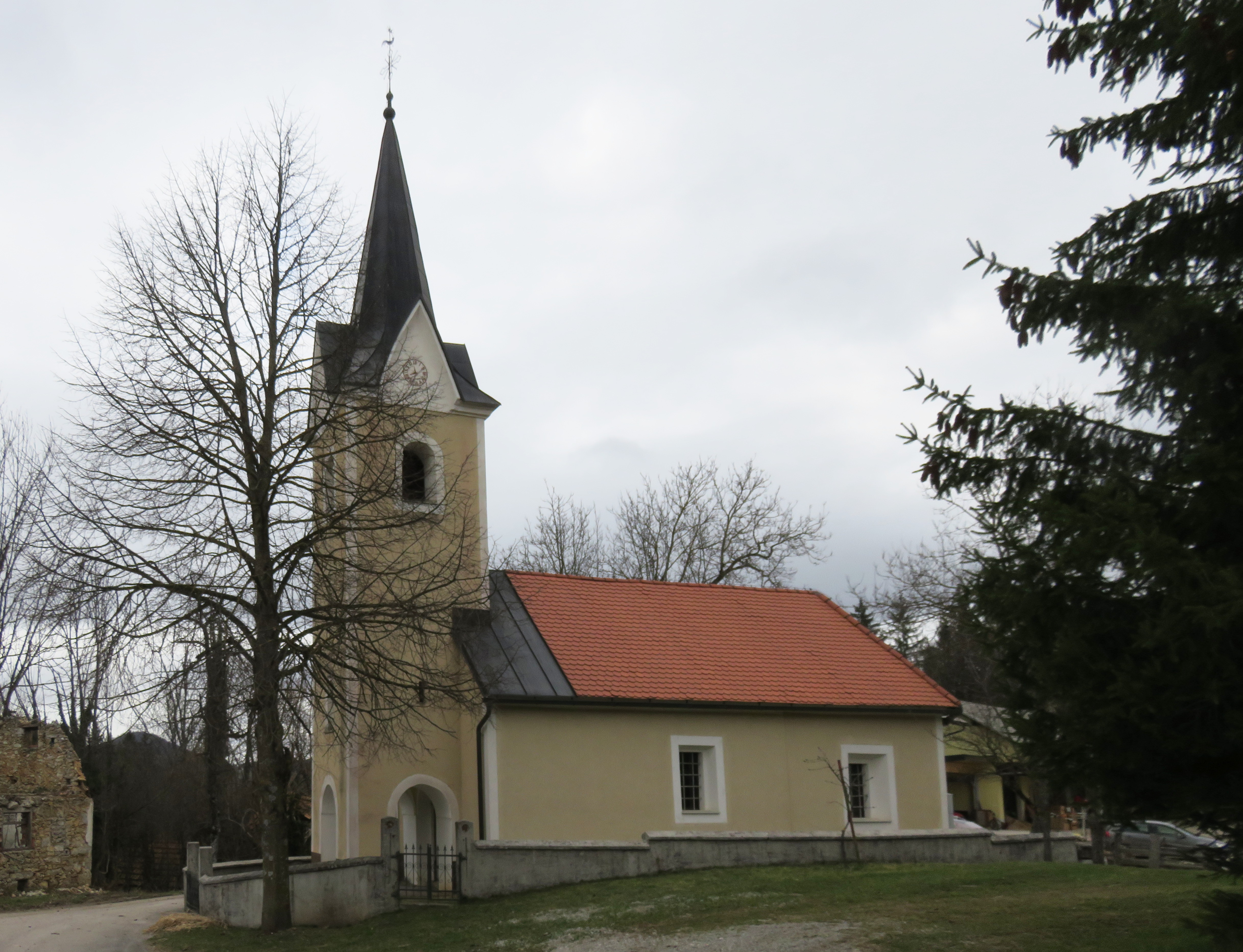
Saints Peter and Paul Church

The local church is dedicated to Saints Peter and Paul and belongs to the Parish of Struge. It is a medieval building that was extensively rebuilt in the mid-18th century.
