= Zdenska Vas =

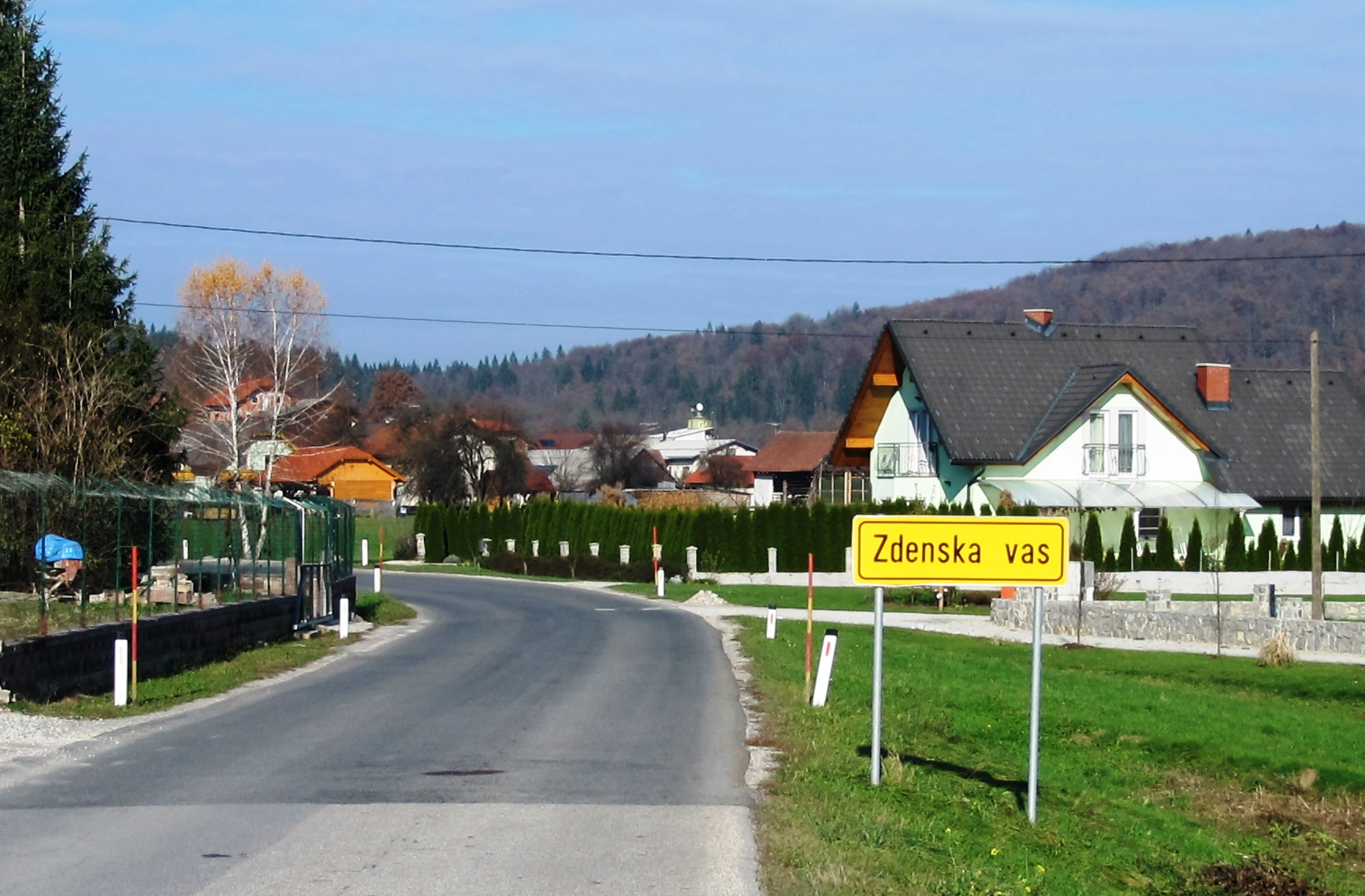
- Zdenska Vas

- Location in Slovenia
- Coordinates: 45°51′27.52″N 14°42′19.76″E
- Country: Slovenia
- Traditional region: Lower Carniola
- Statistical region: Central Slovenia
- Municipality: Dobrepolje

Area
  - Total: 3.85 km^{2} (1.49 sq mi)
- Elevation: 441 m (1,447 ft)

Population (2020)
  - Total: 264
  - Density: 68.6/km^{2} (178/sq mi)

Zdenska Vas (pronounced [ˈzdeːnska ˈʋaːs]; Slovene: Zdenska vas, German: Sdenskawas) is a village north of Videm in the Municipality of Dobrepolje in Slovenia. The area is part of the historical region of Lower Carniola. The municipality is now included in the Central Slovenia Statistical Region.

== Name ==
The name Zdenska vas means 'village at Zdenec Spring'. The spring is near the crossroads in the village, and a cistern, now abandoned, was built at the spring to collect water. The name of the spring comes from the dialect common noun zden(e)c 'spring', which is derived from the standard form studenec 'spring, well' through syncope and assimilation.

== History ==
Zdenska Vas was first mentioned in written sources in 1256, when the Count of Ortenburg sold the village to the monastery at Stična. The village was damaged by fires in 1865 and 1902. During the Second World War, Italian and MVAC forces had a military post at Saint Anthony's Church; this post was used by German and Home Guard troops later in the war. The post was attacked by the Partisans on 29 February and 1 March 1944, during which many houses and outbuildings in the village were destroyed.

== Church ==
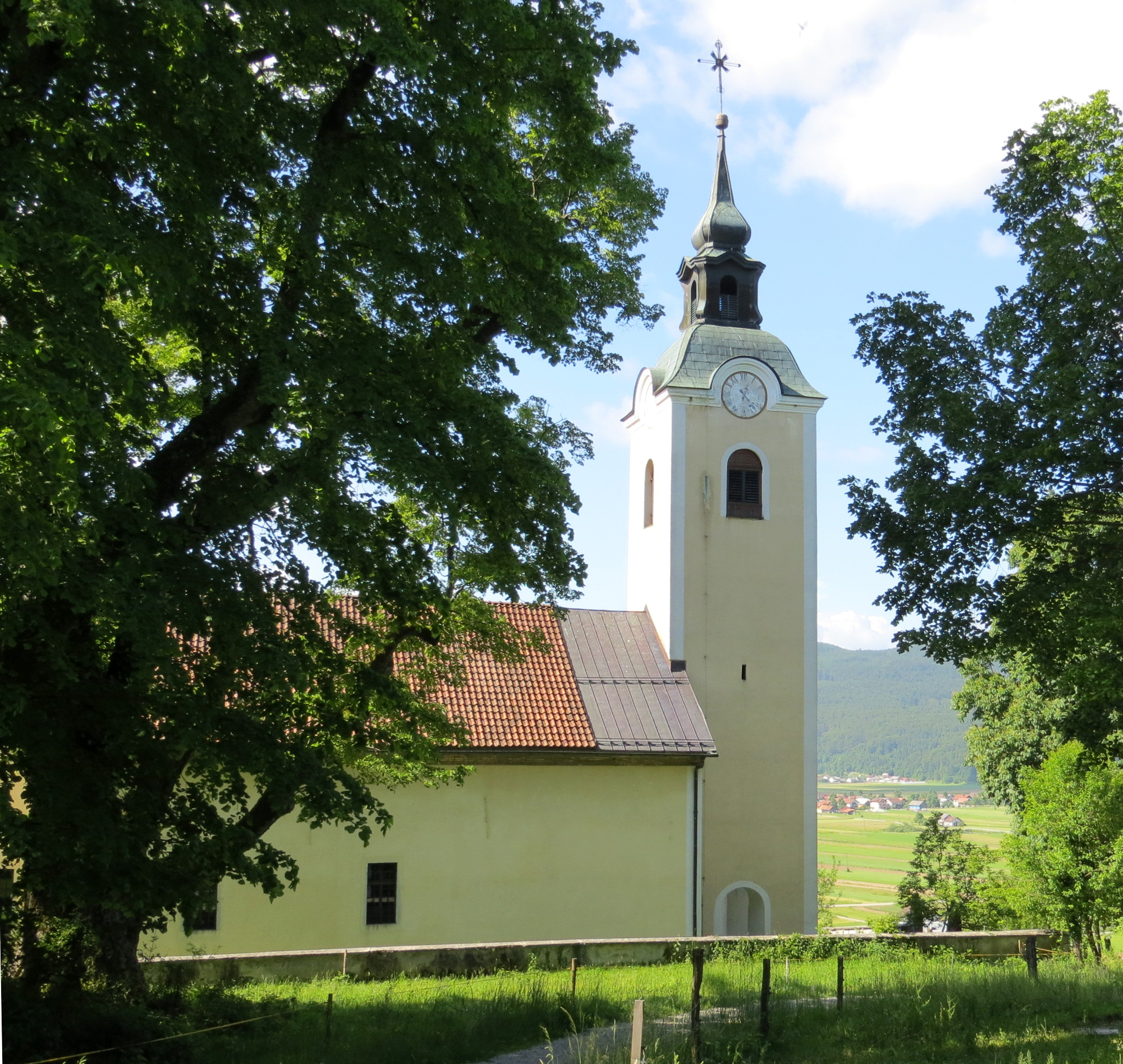
Saint Anthony of Padua Church

The local church, built on the hillside north of the village, is dedicated to Saint Anthony of Padua and belongs to the Parish of Dobrepolje–Videm. The church was established in the second half of the 17th century. In the mid-19th century it was painted with frescoes by Štefan Šubic (1820–1884). The church was damaged and burned during bombing in 1944. Among the furnishings, the local people were able to save a statue of Saint Anthony of Padua, the tabernacle, and a pew. Permission to restore the church was not obtained until after Slovenia became independent. The paintings in the church were restored in 1991 by the painter Izidor Mole, assisted by Tine Šporar from Podpeč.
