= Paka, Dobrepolje =

Paka
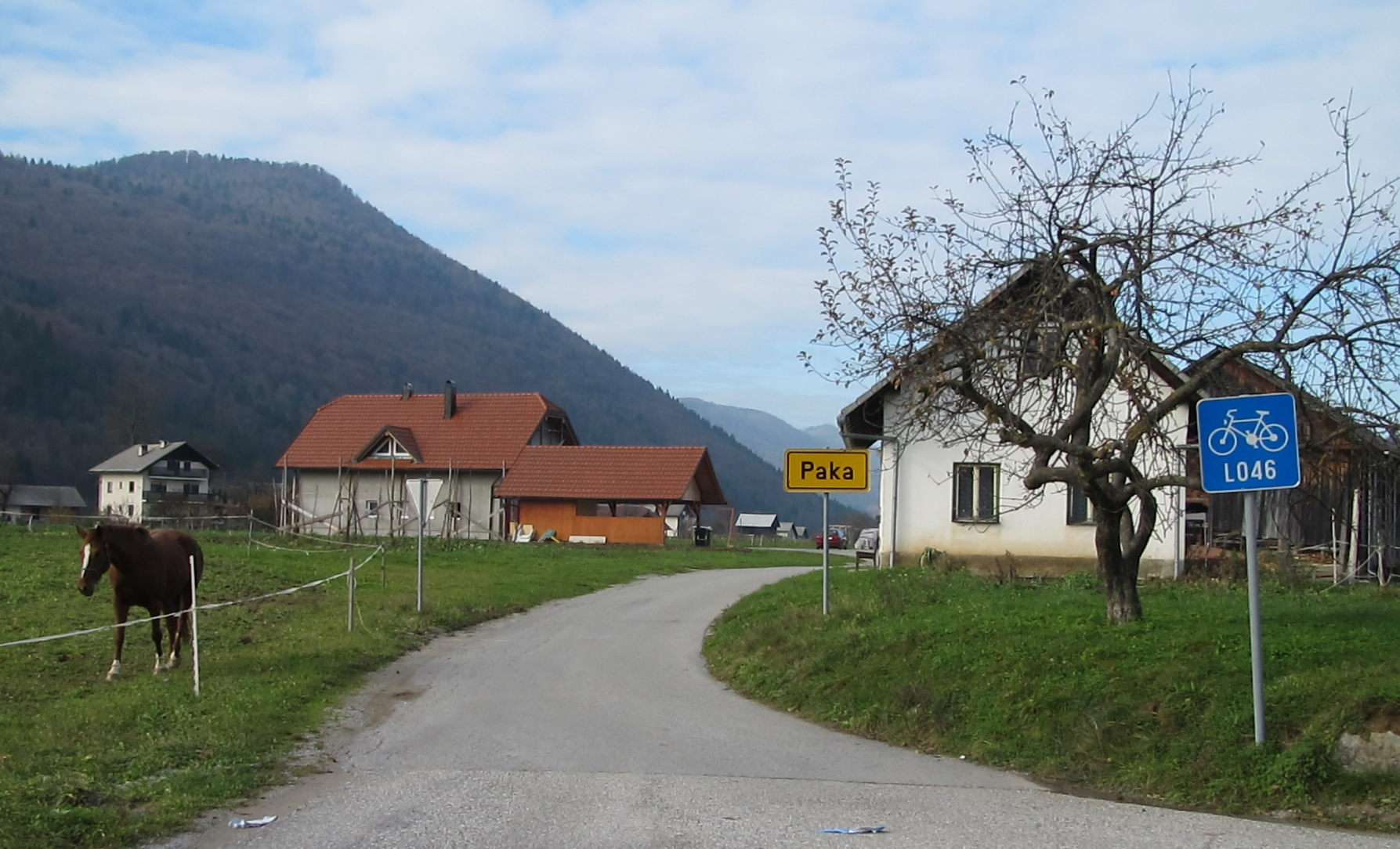

- Location in Slovenia
- Coordinates: 45°46′49.77″N 14°46′18.2″E
- Country: Slovenia
- Traditional region: Lower Carniola
- Statistical region: Central Slovenia
- Municipality: Dobrepolje

Area
  - Total: 0.11 km^{2} (0.042 sq mi)
- Elevation: 417 m (1,368 ft)

Population (2020)
  - Total: 22
  - Density: 200/km^{2} (520/sq mi)

Paka (pronounced [ˈpaːka]) is a small settlement in the Municipality of Dobrepolje in Slovenia. The area is part of the historical region of Lower Carniola. The municipality is now included in the Central Slovenia Statistical Region.

== Name ==
The name Paka is a relatively common hydronym (cf. the Paka River) and toponym in Slovenia. As a hydronym, the designation comes from Slavic *paka (voda) 'water flowing the wrong/opposite direction', and some settlements named Paka are derived from their location near such watercourses. However, the toponym Paka may also be derived from the Slovene common noun paka 'rise, elevation', referring to settlements in such a location.

== Cultural heritage ==
A small chapel-shrine in the settlement is dedicated to the Sacred Heart of Jesus and dates to the early 20th century.
