= Tržič, Dobrepolje =

Tržič
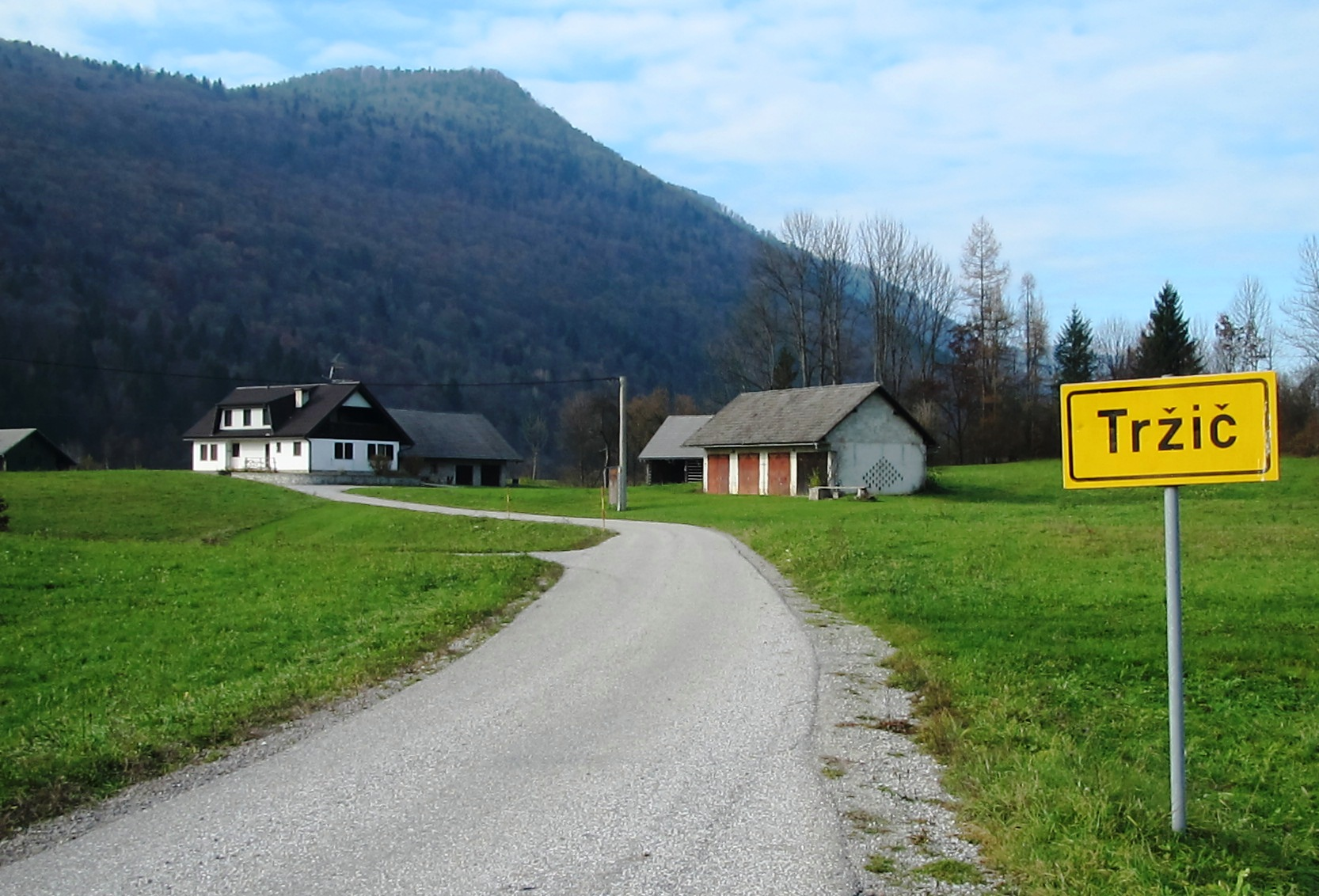

- Location in Slovenia
- Coordinates: 45°46′53.95″N 14°46′1.52″E
- Country: Slovenia
- Traditional region: Lower Carniola
- Statistical region: Central Slovenia
- Municipality: Dobrepolje

Area
  - Total: 0.89 km^{2} (0.34 sq mi)
- Elevation: 418.6 m (1,373 ft)

Population (2020)
  - Total: 23
  - Density: 26/km^{2} (67/sq mi)

Tržič (pronounced [təɾˈʒitʃ]) is a small settlement west of Struge in the southern part of the Municipality of Dobrepolje in Slovenia. The area is part of the historical region of Lower Carniola. The municipality is now included in the Central Slovenia Statistical Region.
