= Vodice, Dobrepolje =

Vodice
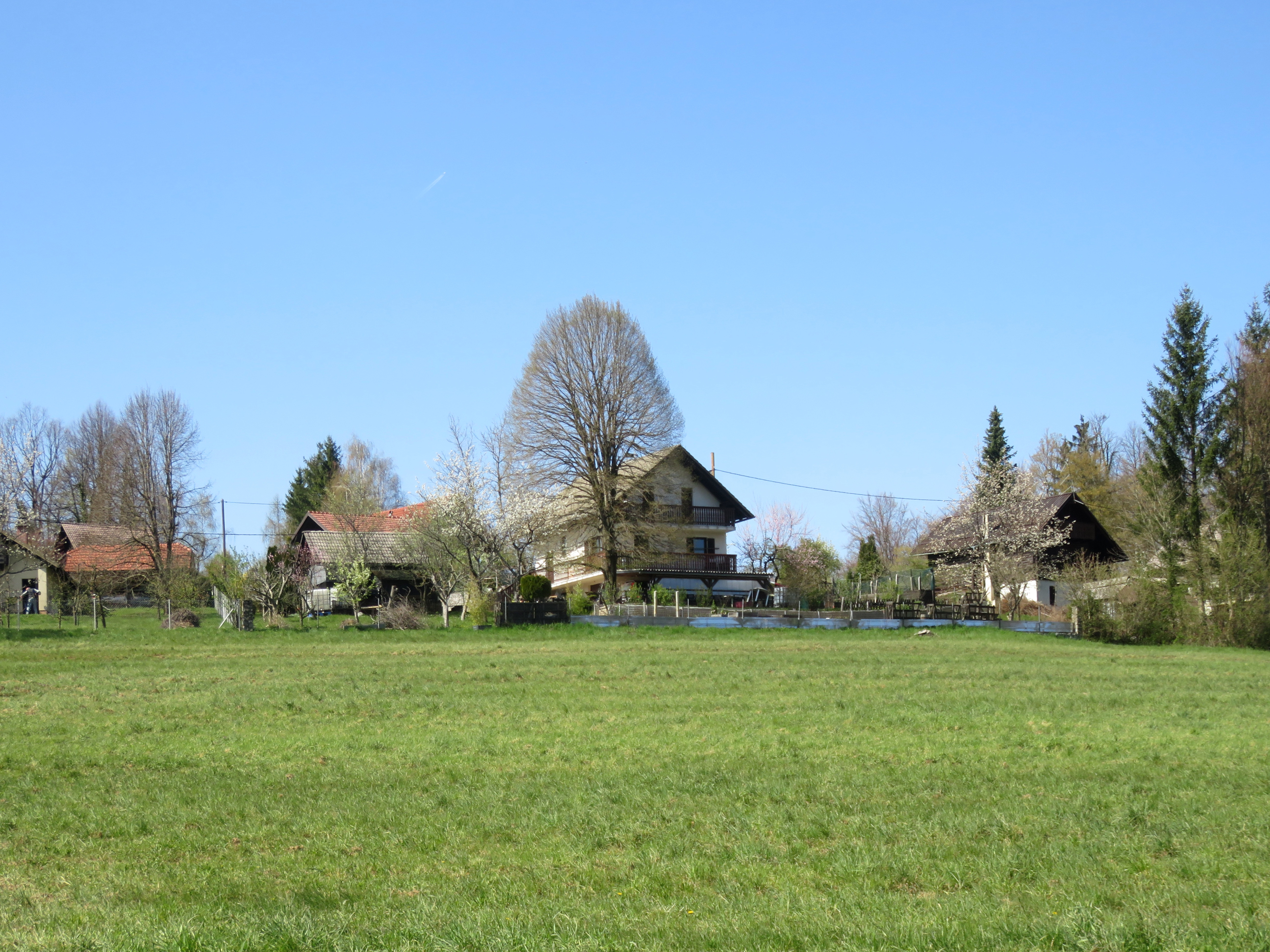

- Location in Slovenia
- Coordinates: 45°53′2.36″N 14°40′6.1″E
- Country: Slovenia
- Traditional region: Lower Carniola
- Statistical region: Central Slovenia
- Municipality: Dobrepolje

Area
  - Total: 2.41 km^{2} (0.93 sq mi)
- Elevation: 577.4 m (1,894 ft)

Population (2020)
  - Total: 25
  - Density: 10/km^{2} (27/sq mi)

Vodice (pronounced [ʋɔˈdiːtsɛ]) is a village southwest of Videm in the Municipality of Dobrepolje in Slovenia. The area is part of the historical region of Lower Carniola. The municipality is now included in the Central Slovenia Statistical Region.

A settlement from Late Antiquity has been identified on Limberk Hill north of the settlement. It was used as a refuge, with locals moving to the safety of the peak during a period of upheaval and migration of various Germanic and Slavic tribes through the region.
