= Bruhanja Vas =

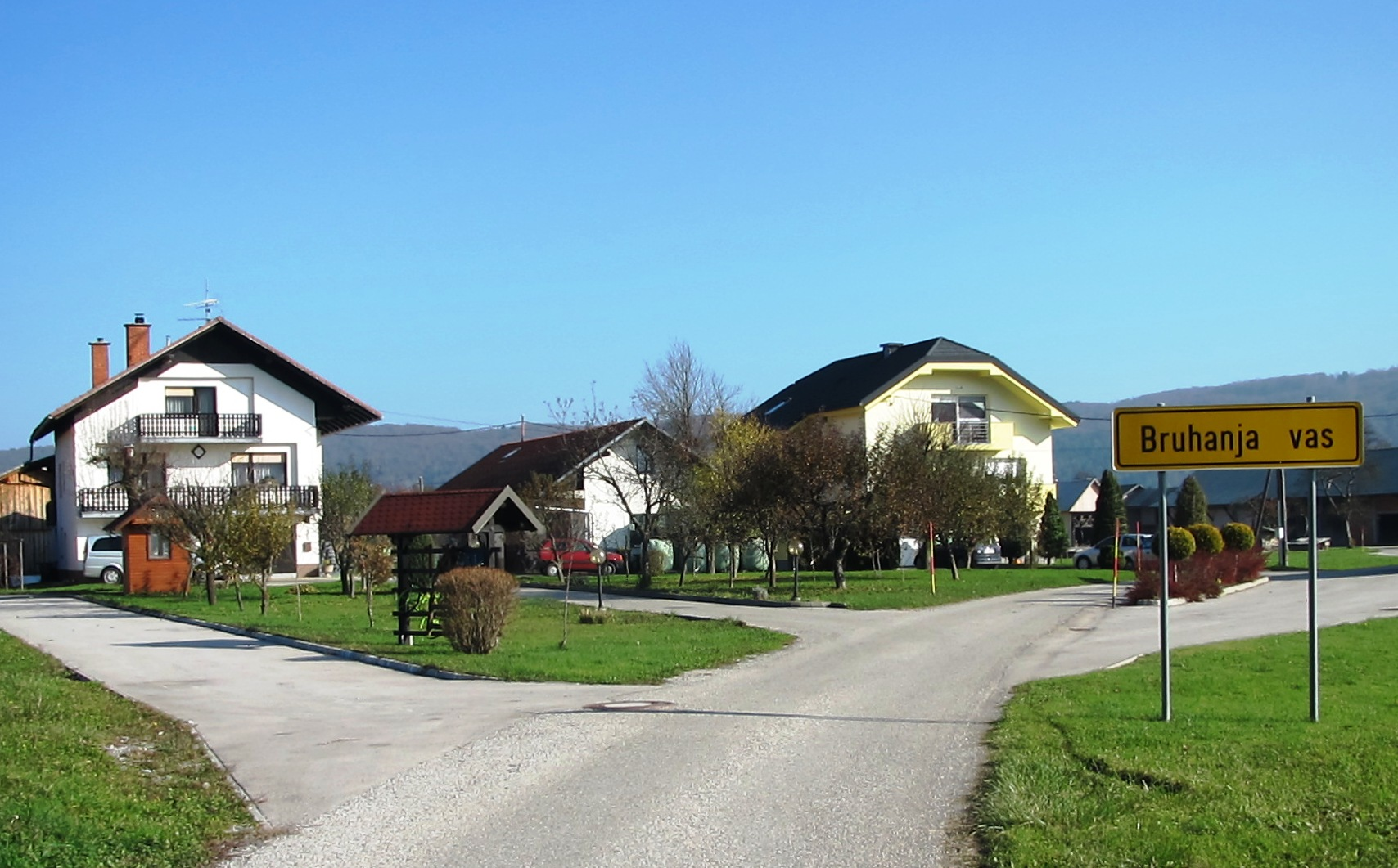

- Location in Slovenia
- Coordinates: 45°50′16.54″N 14°42′15.45″E
- Country: Slovenia
- Traditional region: Lower Carniola
- Statistical region: Central Slovenia
- Municipality: Dobrepolje

Area
  - Total: 4.27 km^{2} (1.65 sq mi)
- Elevation: 435.4 m (1,428 ft)

Population (2020)
  - Total: 119
  - Density: 27.9/km^{2} (72.2/sq mi)

Bruhanja Vas (pronounced [ˈbɾuːxanja ˈʋaːs]; Slovene: Bruhanja vas) is a settlement in the Municipality of Dobrepolje in Slovenia. It lies in the karst field south of Videm. The area is part of the traditional region of Lower Carniola. The municipality is now included in the Central Slovenia Statistical Region.

== Name ==
Bruhanja Vas was attested in historical sources as Guetenueld in 1343, Mükendorff in 1436, Fleygendorff in 1463, and Veigundarff in 1484, among other names and spellings.

== Gallery ==
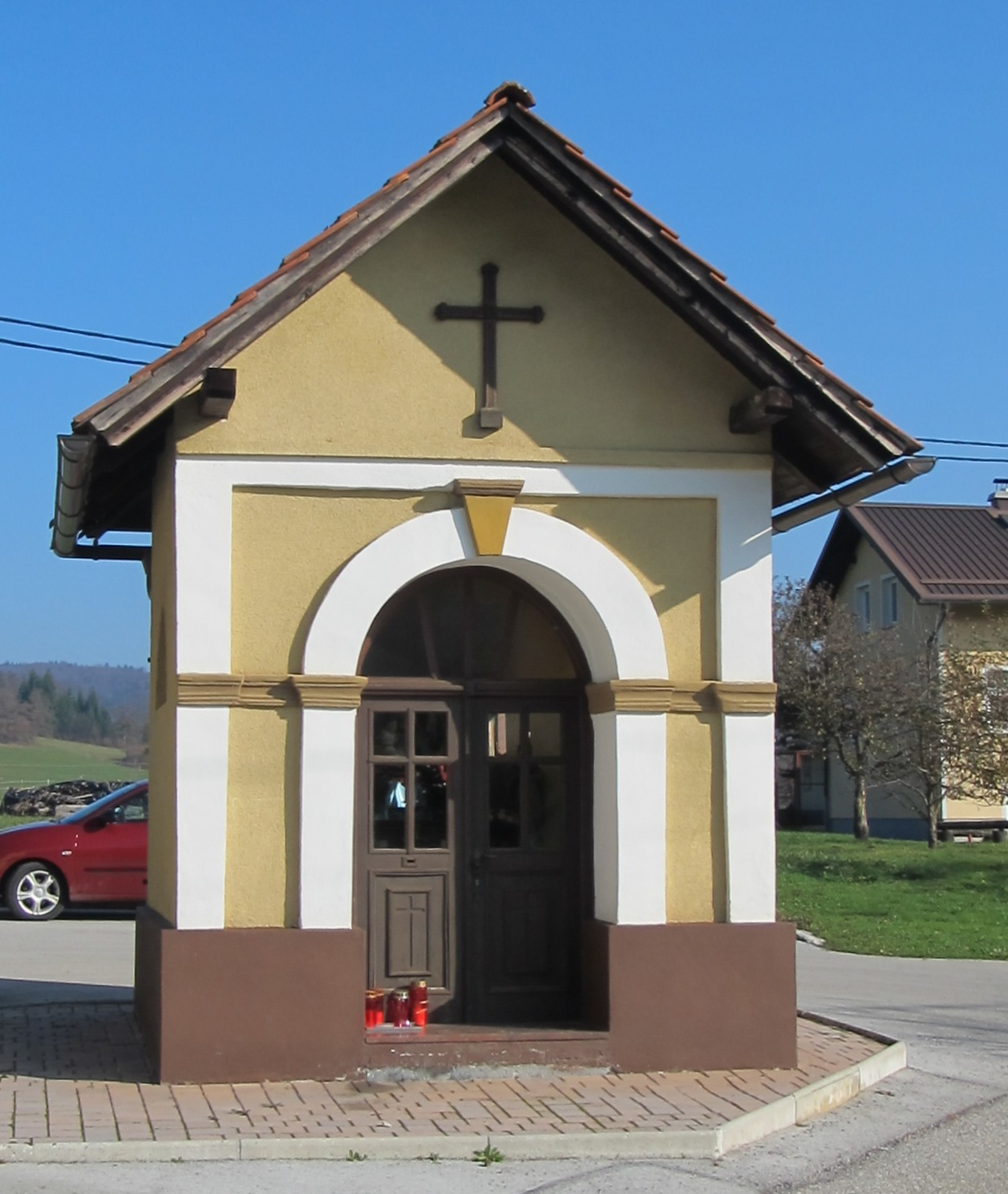
Chapel-shrine in Bruhanja Vas
