= Cesta, Dobrepolje =

Cesta
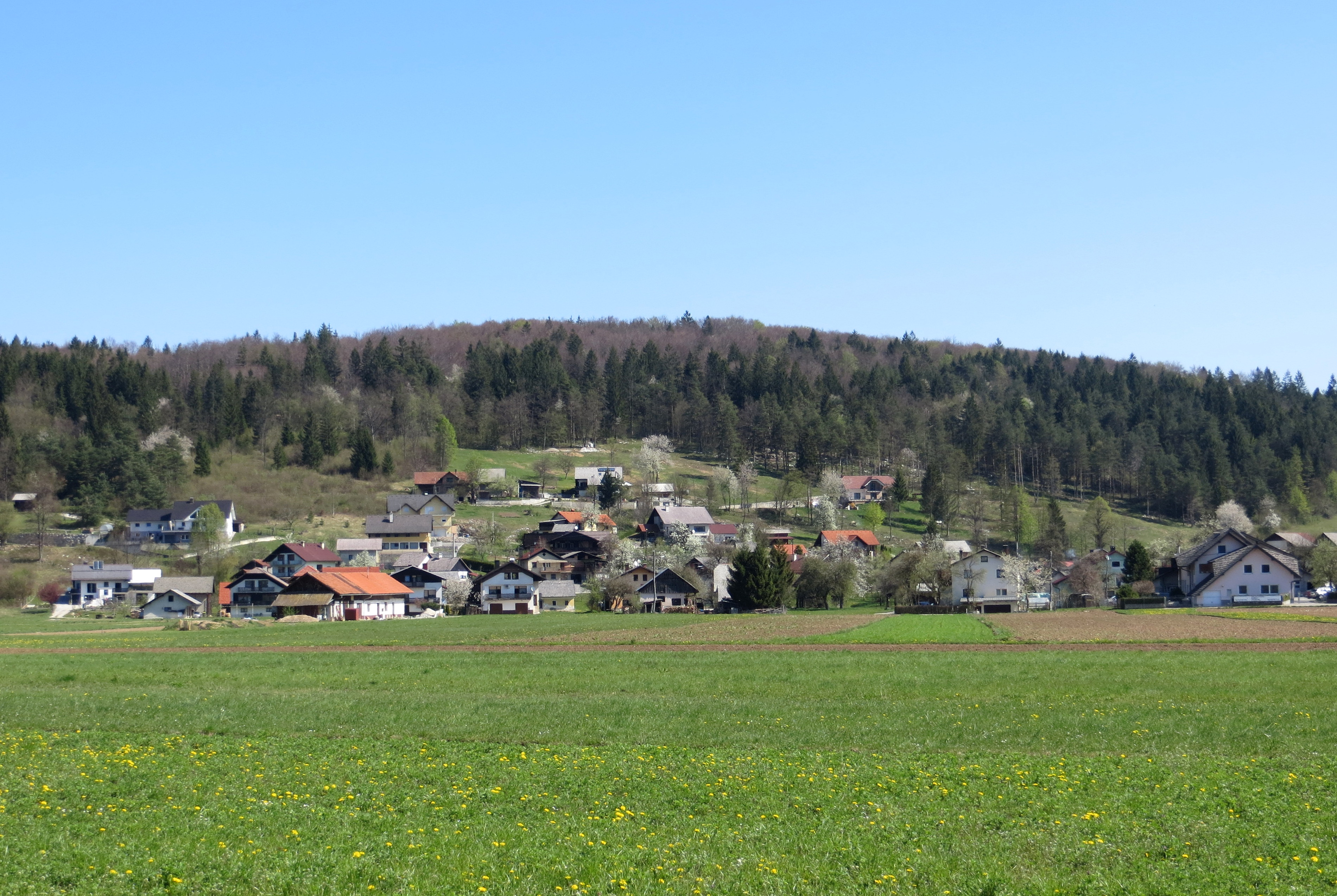

- Location in Slovenia
- Coordinates: 45°51′37.07″N 14°41′29.12″E
- Country: Slovenia
- Traditional region: Lower Carniola
- Statistical region: Central Slovenia
- Municipality: Dobrepolje

Area
  - Total: 4.4 km^{2} (1.7 sq mi)
- Elevation: 444.2 m (1,457 ft)

Population (2020)
  - Total: 268
  - Density: 61/km^{2} (160/sq mi)

Cesta (pronounced [ˈtseːsta]; German: Zesta) is a village in the Municipality of Dobrepolje in the historical region of Lower Carniola in Slovenia. The municipality is now included in the Central Slovenia Statistical Region.

== Name ==
Cesta was attested in historical sources as Cezt in 1141 and Strassen in 1436. The Slovene name Cesta means 'road'. Places with this name in Slovenia lie along roads that predated Slavic settlement in the area.

== Cultural heritage ==
A small roadside chapel-shrine in the southern part of the settlement dates to the late 19th century.
