= Podgorica, Dobrepolje =

Podgorica
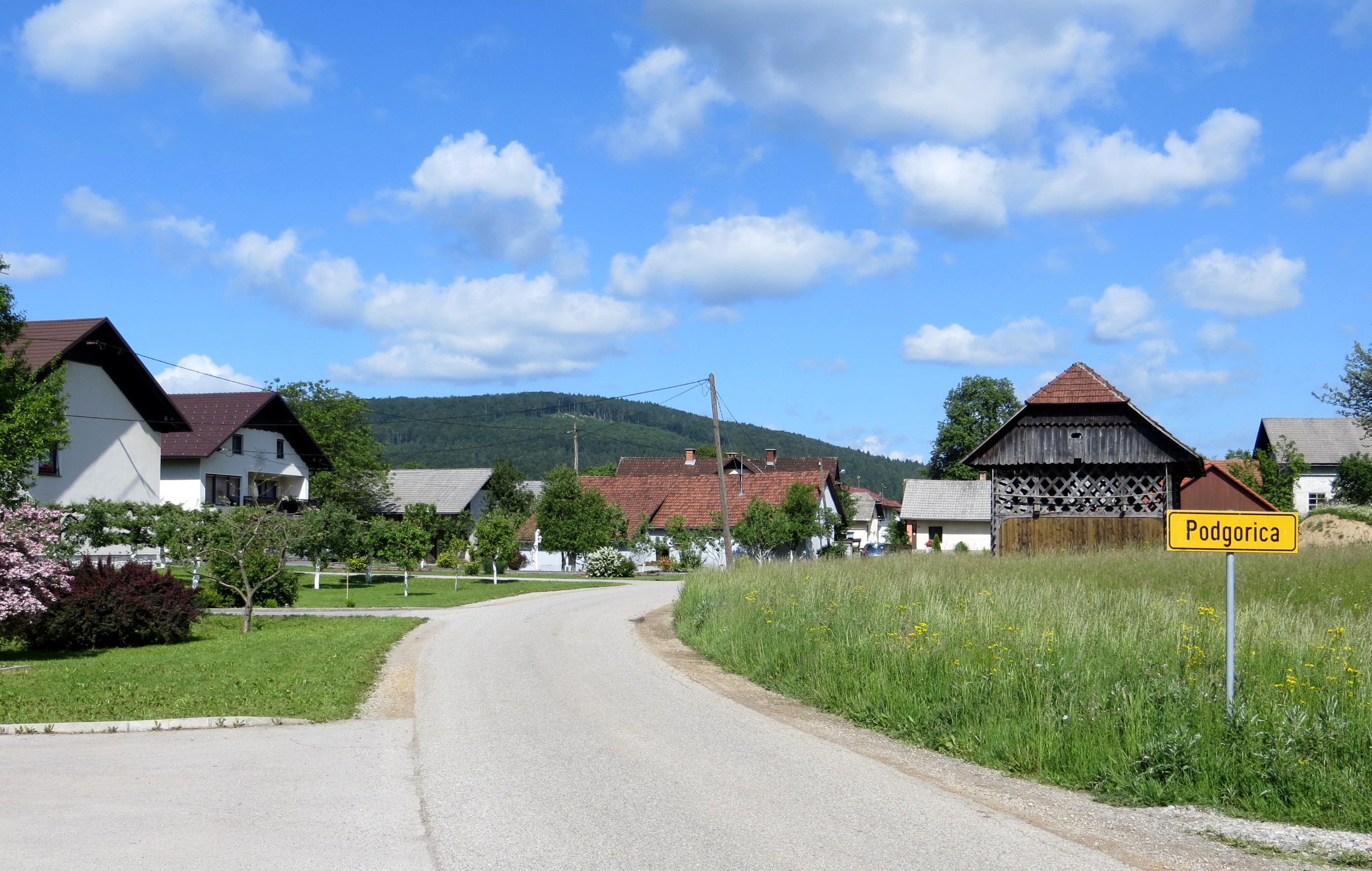

- Location in Slovenia
- Coordinates: 45°50′38.54″N 14°42′4.67″E
- Country: Slovenia
- Traditional region: Lower Carniola
- Statistical region: Central Slovenia
- Municipality: Dobrepolje

Area
  - Total: 0.88 km^{2} (0.34 sq mi)
- Elevation: 438.3 m (1,438 ft)

Population (2020)
  - Total: 68
  - Density: 77/km^{2} (200/sq mi)

Podgorica (pronounced [pɔdɡɔˈɾiːtsa]) is a village south of Videm in the Municipality of Dobrepolje in Slovenia. The area is part of the historical region of Lower Carniola. The municipality is now included in the Central Slovenia Statistical Region.

== Church ==
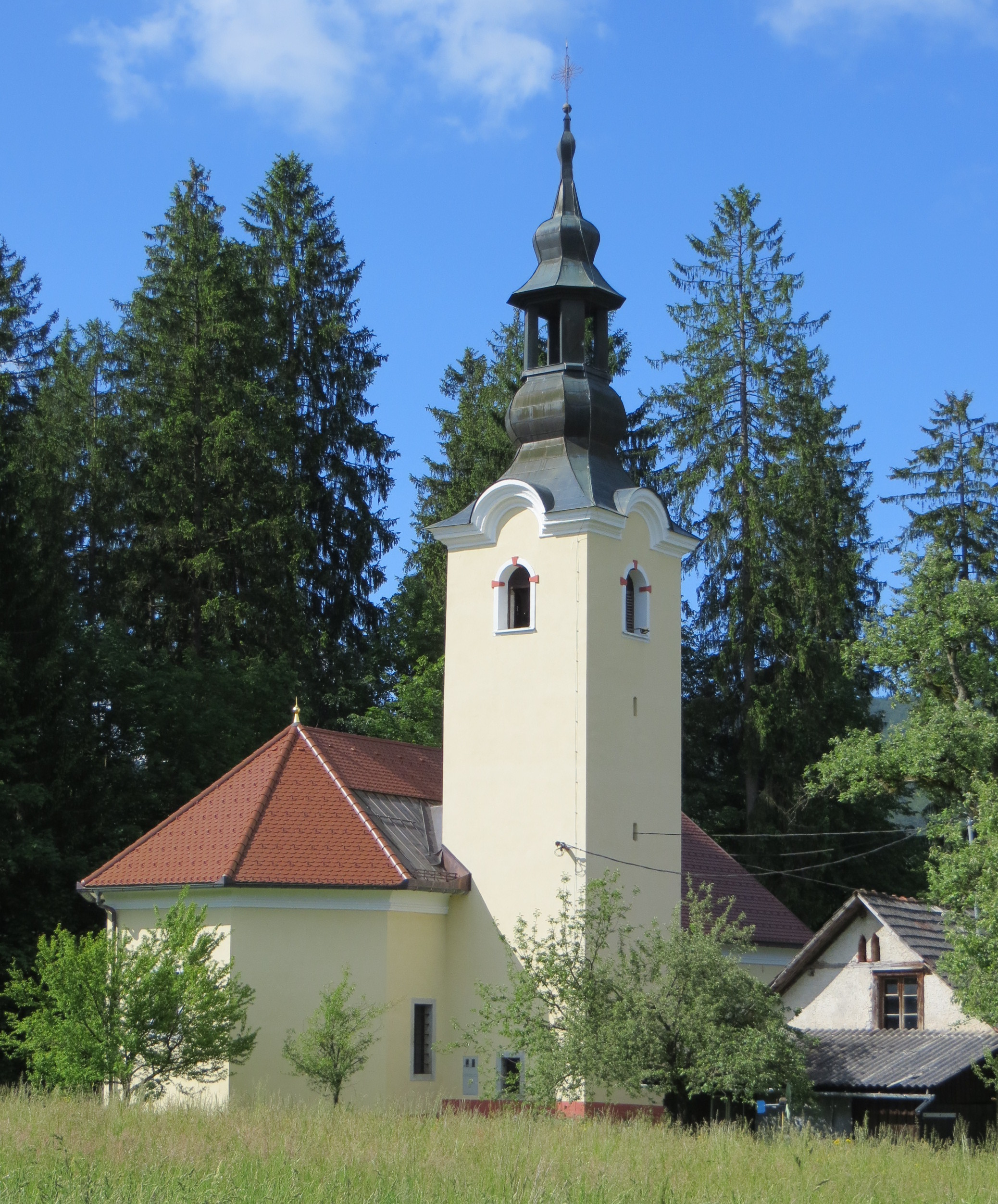
Our Lady of the Rosary Church

The local church is dedicated to Our Lady of the Rosary (Slovene: Rožnovenska Mati božja) and belongs to the Parish of Dobrepolje–Videm. It dates to the mid-17th century with major 19th-century alterations.
