= Hočevje =

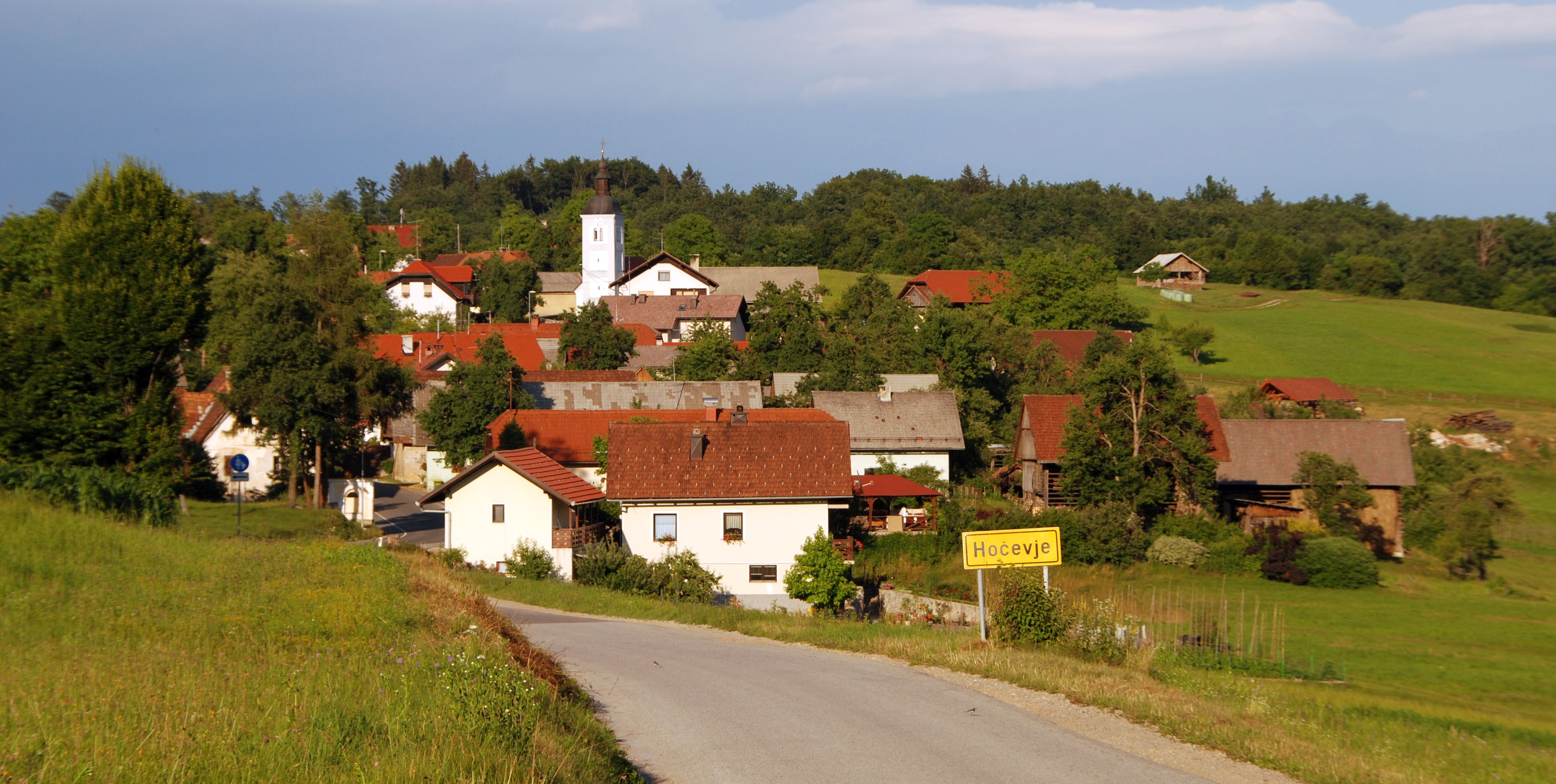

- Location in Slovenia
- Coordinates: 45°52′14.86″N 14°45′8.72″E
- Country: Slovenia
- Traditional region: Lower Carniola
- Statistical region: Central Slovenia
- Municipality: Dobrepolje

Area
  - Total: 8.55 km^{2} (3.30 sq mi)
- Elevation: 472.9 m (1,552 ft)

Population (2020)
  - Total: 158
  - Density: 18.5/km^{2} (47.9/sq mi)

Hočevje (pronounced [xɔˈtʃeːu̯jɛ]) is a village in the Municipality of Dobrepolje in Slovenia. The area is part of the historical region of Lower Carniola. The municipality is now included in the Central Slovenia Statistical Region.

== Church ==
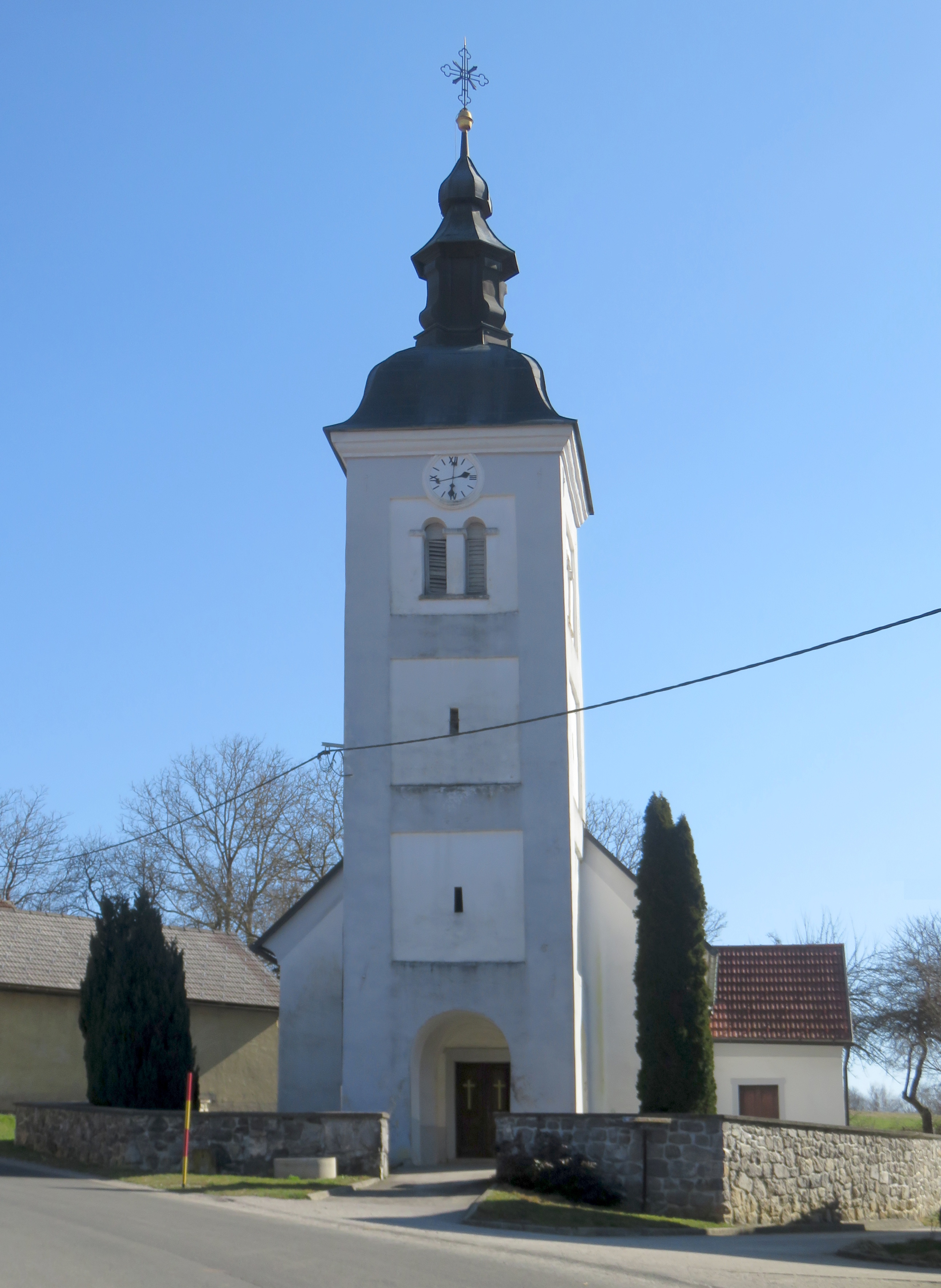
Saint Joseph's Church

The local church is dedicated to Saint Joseph and belongs to the parish of Dobrepolje–Videm. It was built in the 17th century.
