= Podpeč, Dobrepolje =

Podpeč
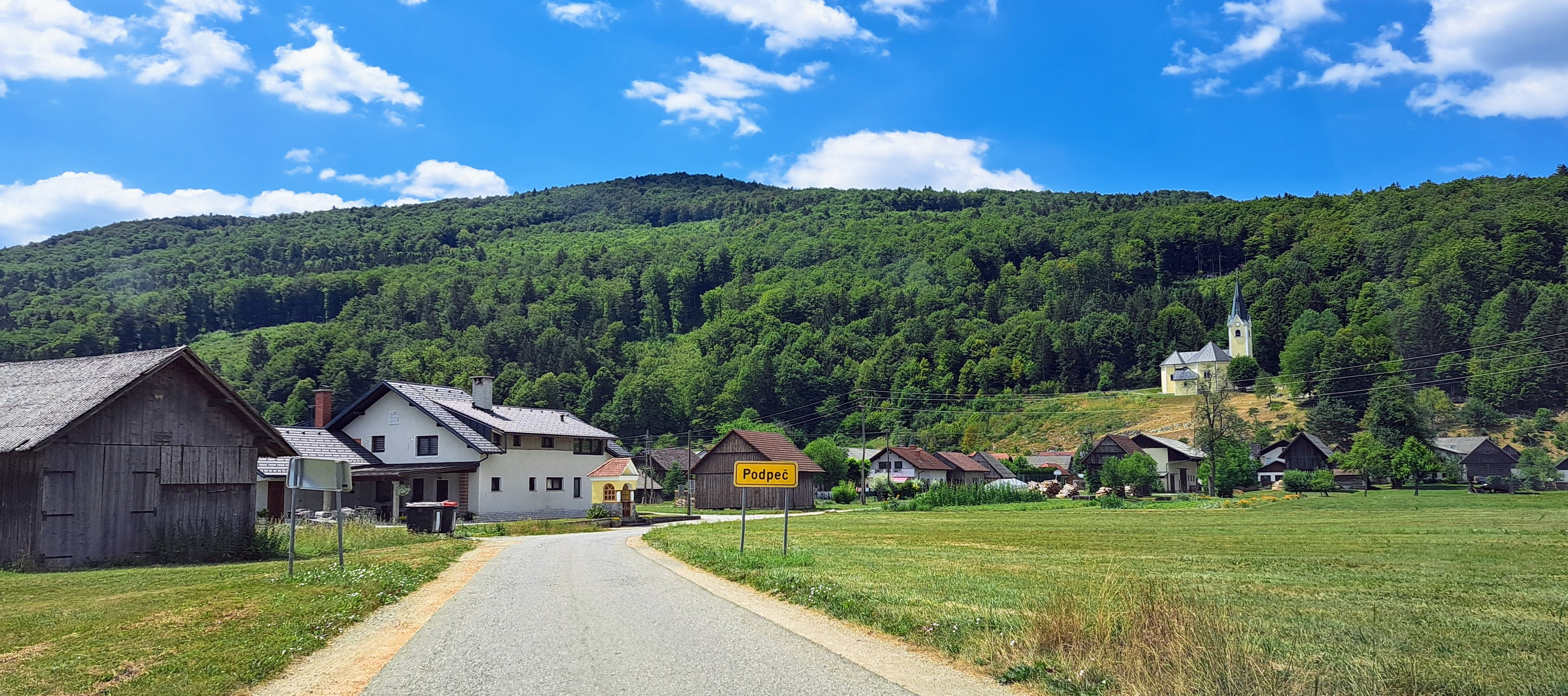

- Location in Slovenia
- Coordinates: 45°50′23.82″N 14°41′11.92″E
- Country: Slovenia
- Traditional region: Lower Carniola
- Statistical region: Central Slovenia
- Municipality: Dobrepolje

Area
  - Total: 2.98 km^{2} (1.15 sq mi)
- Elevation: 440.7 m (1,446 ft)

Population (2020)
  - Total: 132
  - Density: 44.3/km^{2} (115/sq mi)

Podpeč (pronounced [pɔtˈpeːtʃ]) is a village southwest of Videm in the Municipality of Dobrepolje in Slovenia. The area is part of the historical region of Lower Carniola. The municipality is now included in the Central Slovenia Statistical Region.

== Church ==
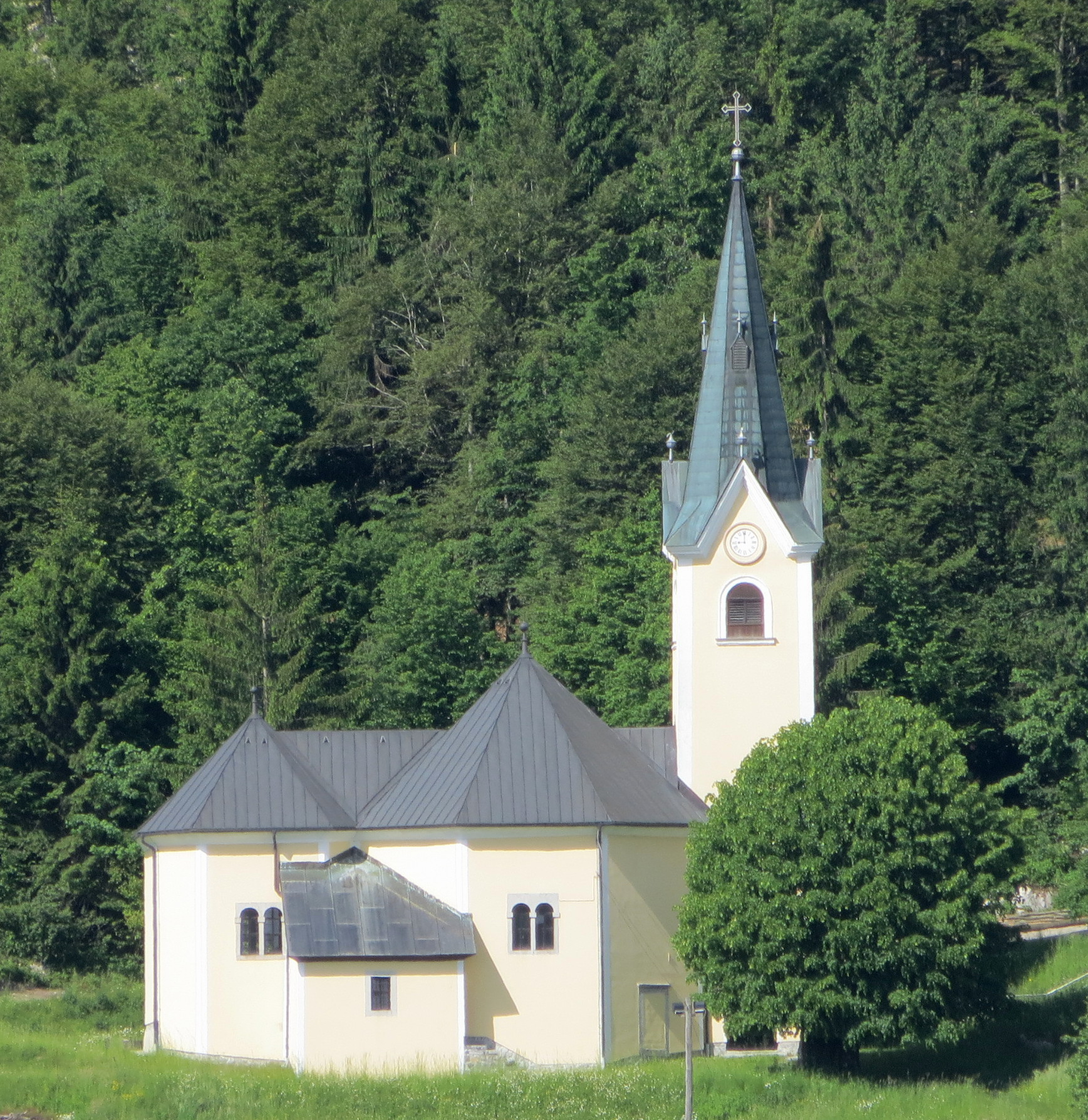
Saint Martin's Church

The local church is dedicated to Saint Martin and belongs to the Parish of Dobrepolje–Videm. It dates to the 16th century and was extensively renovated in the early 20th century.
