= Lipa, Dobrepolje =

Lipa
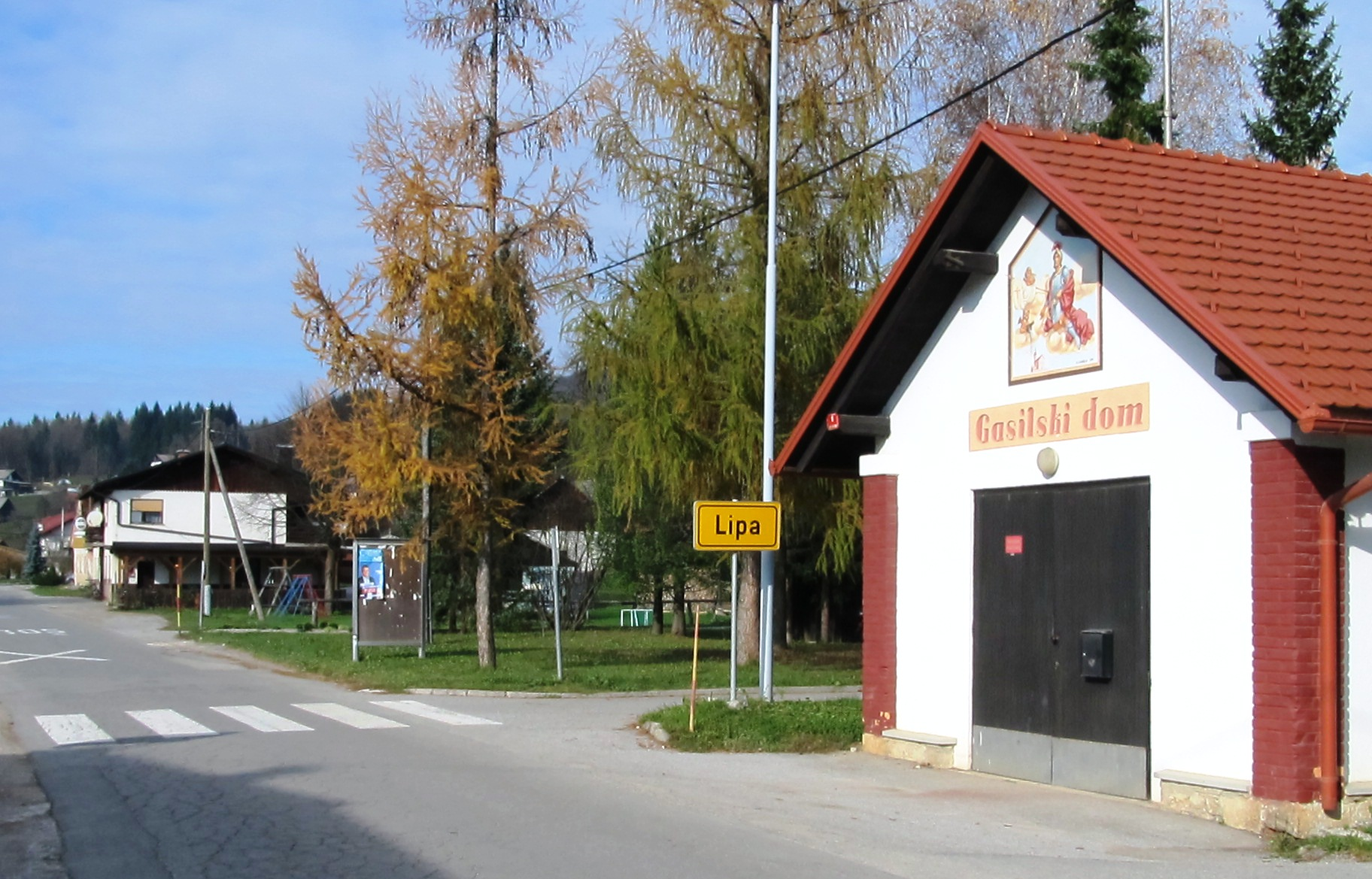

- Location in Slovenia
- Coordinates: 45°47′3.39″N 14°46′24.63″E
- Country: Slovenia
- Traditional region: Lower Carniola
- Statistical region: Central Slovenia
- Municipality: Dobrepolje

Area
  - Total: 4.26 km^{2} (1.64 sq mi)
- Elevation: 420 m (1,380 ft)

Population (2020)
  - Total: 65
  - Density: 15/km^{2} (40/sq mi)

Lipa (pronounced [ˈliːpa]) is a settlement in the Municipality of Dobrepolje in Slovenia. The municipality is included in the Central Slovenia Statistical Region. The entire area is part of the historical region of Lower Carniola.
