= Podtabor, Dobrepolje =

Podtabor
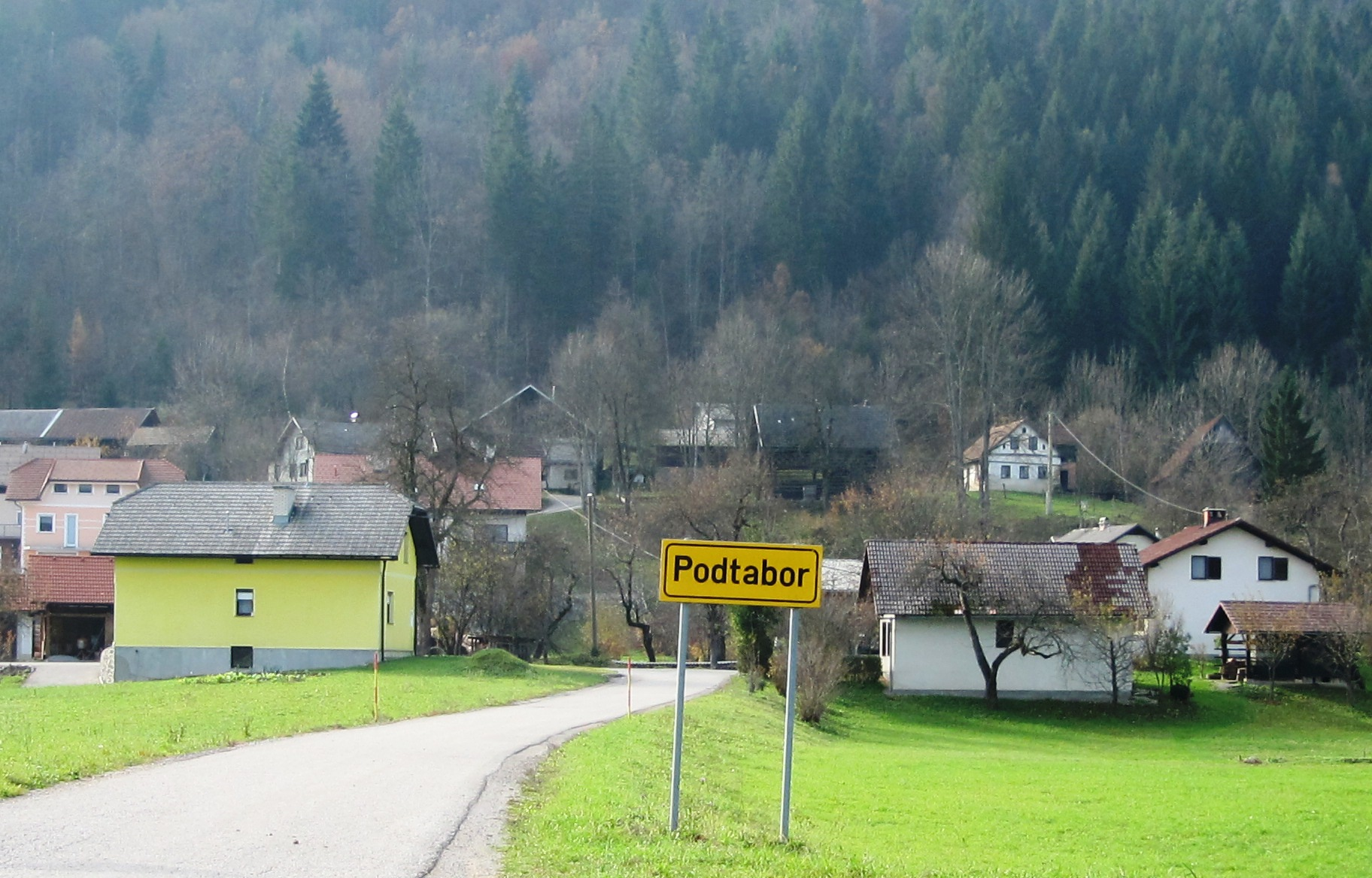

- Location in Slovenia
- Coordinates: 45°46′37.13″N 14°46′10.38″E
- Country: Slovenia
- Traditional region: Lower Carniola
- Statistical region: Central Slovenia
- Municipality: Dobrepolje

Area
  - Total: 2.76 km^{2} (1.07 sq mi)
- Elevation: 413.7 m (1,357 ft)

Population (2020)
  - Total: 74
  - Density: 27/km^{2} (69/sq mi)

Podtabor (pronounced [pɔˈtaːbɔɾ]) is a settlement in the southern part of the Municipality of Dobrepolje in Slovenia. The area is part of the historical region of Lower Carniola. The municipality is now included in the Central Slovenia Statistical Region.

== History ==
In September 1933, catastrophic flooding occurred in Podtabor. After heavy rains, floodwater from creeks and estavelles inundated the area, flooding many houses in the village to the level of their roofs.

On May 13, 1941 the first armed resistance against Axis forces in Slovenian territory during the Second World War took place in the hills above Podtabor. Three members of the TIGR organization clashed with an Italian Carabinieri patrol from Ribnica at a forester's cabin. The leader of the group, Danilo Zelen (1907–1941), was killed in the half-hour engagement and was the first Slovenian to die in combat resisting the Axis forces. Ferdo Kravanja (1912–1944) was wounded and captured, and Anton Majnik (1905–1943) managed to escape. A plaque commemorating the event was installed at the site in 1986.
