= Kolenča Vas =

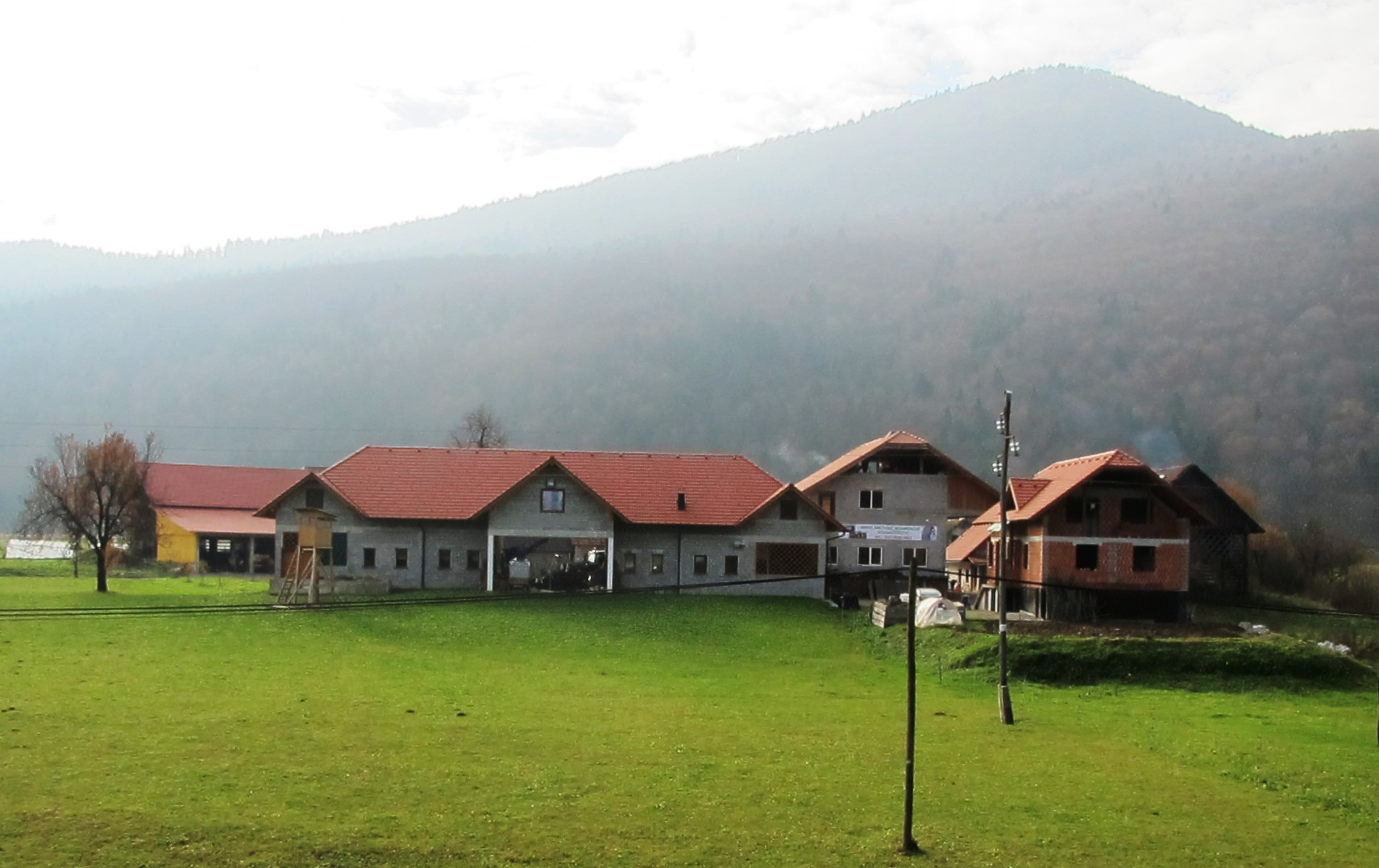

- Location in Slovenia
- Coordinates: 45°47′10.78″N 14°45′52.65″E
- Country: Slovenia
- Traditional region: Lower Carniola
- Statistical region: Central Slovenia
- Municipality: Dobrepolje

Area
  - Total: 0.36 km^{2} (0.14 sq mi)
- Elevation: 417.6 m (1,370 ft)

Population (2020)
  - Total: 43
  - Density: 120/km^{2} (310/sq mi)

Kolenča Vas (pronounced [kɔˈleːntʃa ˈʋaːs]; Slovene: Kolenča vas, German: Kolenzdorf) is a small settlement in the Municipality of Dobrepolje in Slovenia. The area is part of the traditional region of Lower Carniola. The municipality is now included in the Central Slovenia Statistical Region.
