= Ponikve, Dobrepolje =

Ponikve
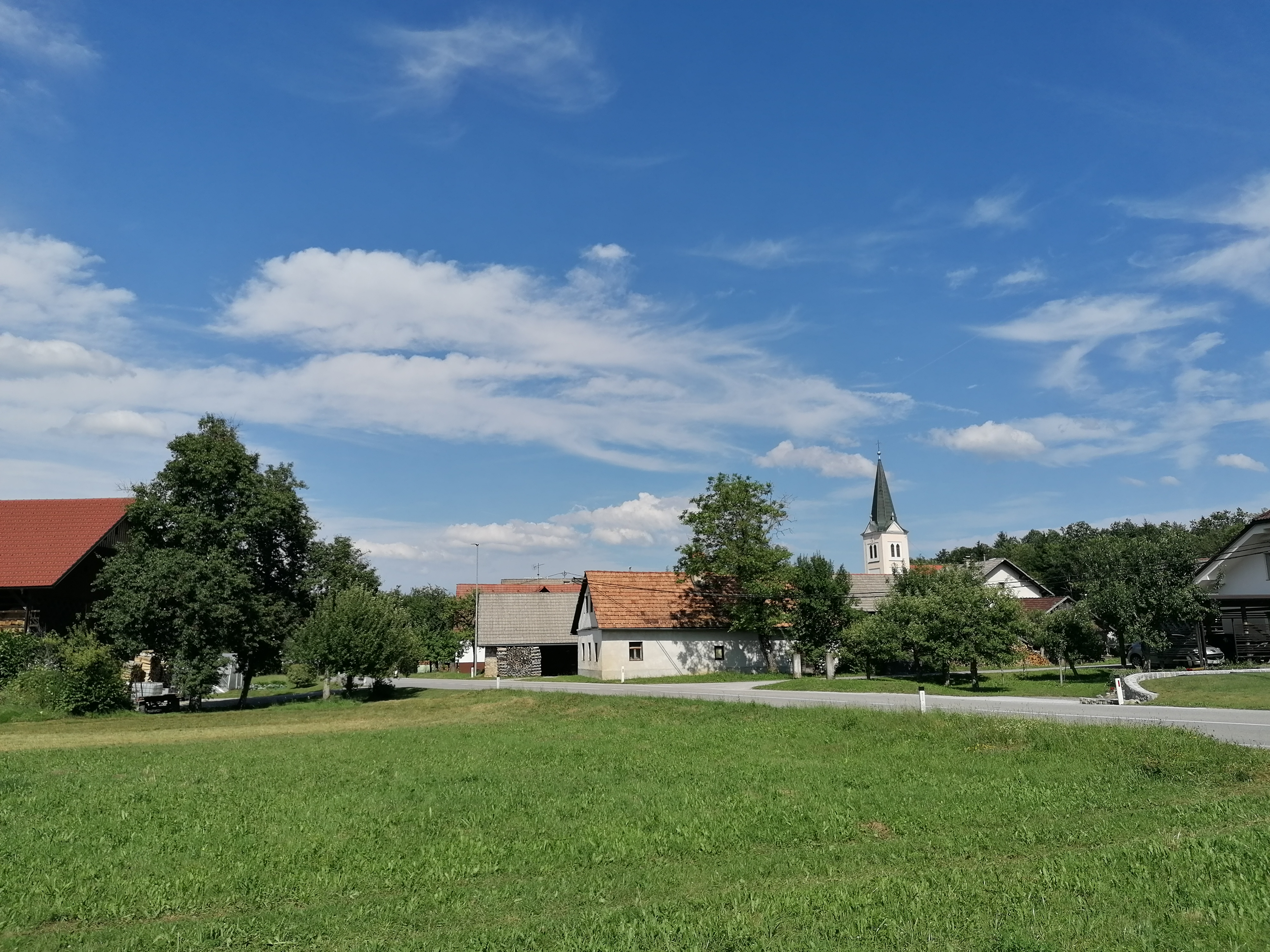

- Location in Slovenia
- Coordinates: 45°51′42.82″N 14°39′5.83″E
- Country: Slovenia
- Traditional region: Lower Carniola
- Statistical region: Central Slovenia
- Municipality: Dobrepolje

Area
  - Total: 7.36 km^{2} (2.84 sq mi)
- Elevation: 463.1 m (1,519 ft)

Population (2020)
  - Total: 503
  - Density: 68.3/km^{2} (177/sq mi)

Ponikve (pronounced [pɔˈniːkʋɛ]; German: Ponique) is a settlement in the Municipality of Dobrepolje in Slovenia. The area is part of the historical region of Lower Carniola. The municipality is now included in the Central Slovenia Statistical Region.

== Name ==
The name Ponikve is a plural form derived from the word ponikva 'influent stream' or 'sinkhole' (into which such a stream disappears). In its plural form it refers to a gently rolling landscape consisting of the basins of an influent stream. Like other villages named Ponikve and similar names (e.g., Ponikva), it refers to a local landscape element. In the past the German name was Ponique.

== Church ==
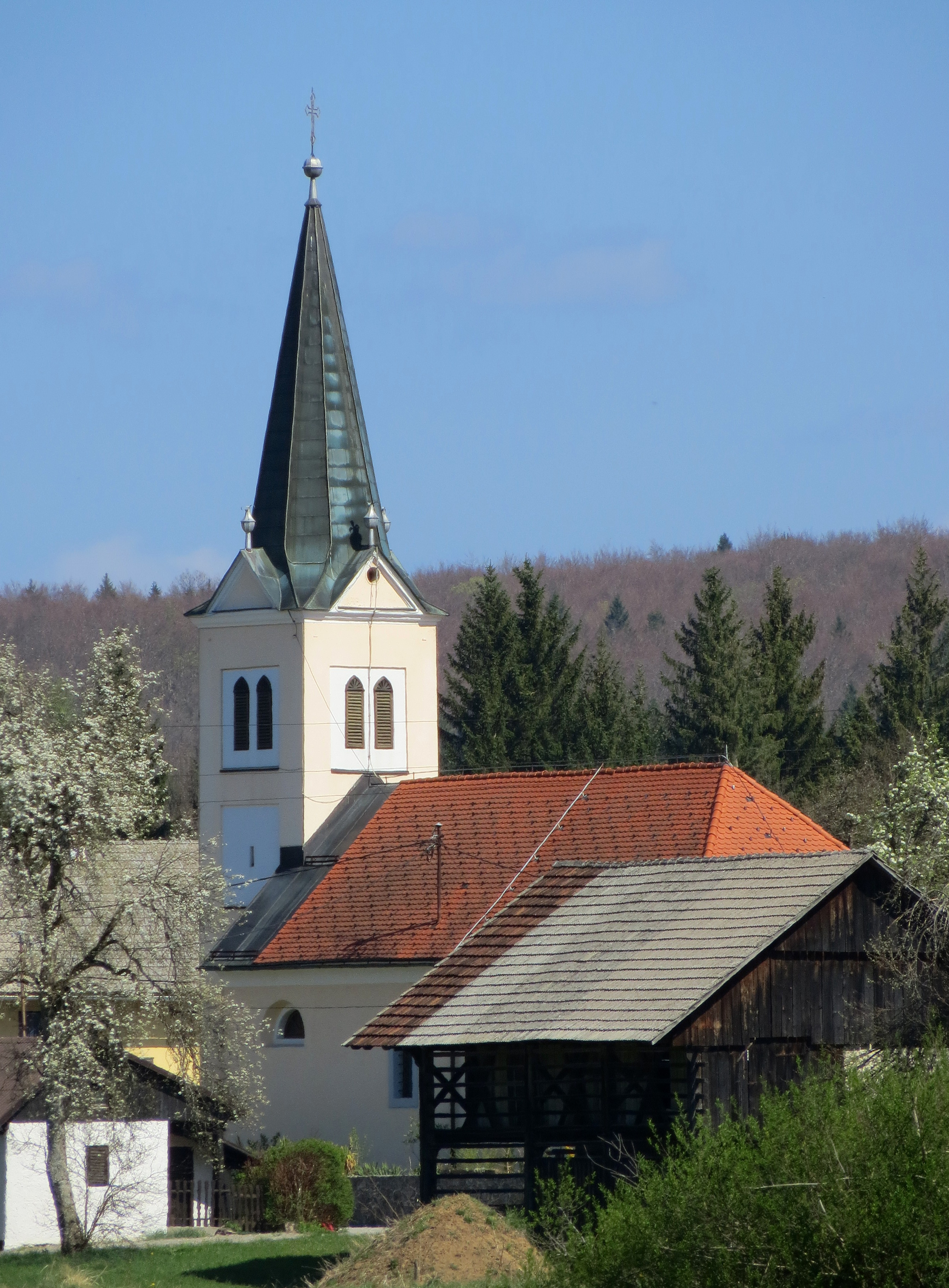
Saint Florian's Church

The local church is dedicated to Saint Florian and belongs to the Parish of Dobrepolje–Videm. It is a Gothic building that was extensively rebuilt in the 18th century.
