= Municipality of Dobrepolje =

Municipality of Slovenia

Municipality of Dobrepolje Občina Dobrepolje
- Municipality
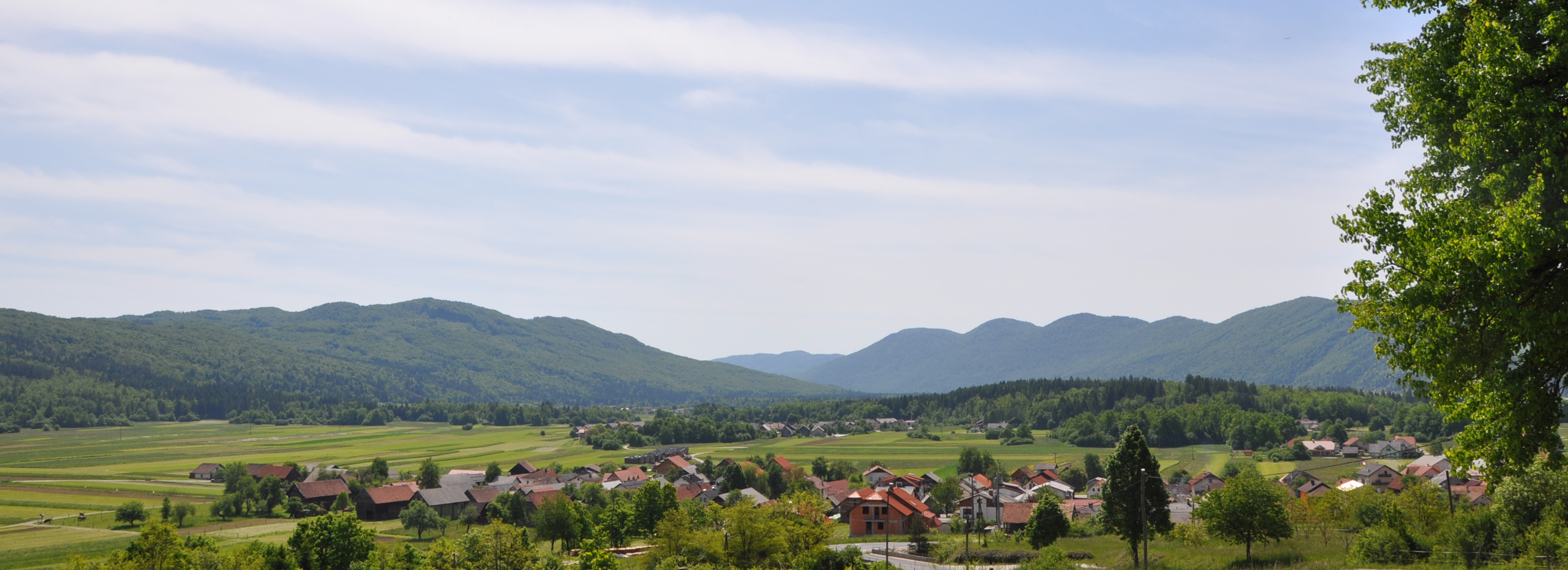

- Location of the Municipality of Dobrepolje in Slovenia
- Coordinates: 45°51′N 14°42′E
- Country: Slovenia

Government
  - Mayor: Igor Ahačevčič (Independent)

Area
  - Total: 94.9 km^{2} (36.6 sq mi)

Population (2002)
  - Total: 3,544
  - Density: 37.3/km^{2} (96.7/sq mi)
- Time zone: UTC+01 (CET)
  - Summer (DST): UTC+02 (CEST)
- Website: www.dobrepolje.si

The Municipality of Dobrepolje (pronounced [dɔˈbɾeːpɔljɛ]; Slovene: Občina Dobrepolje) is a municipality in Slovenia. It lies in a karst valley approximately 35 km (21.75 mi) south of the Slovenian capital Ljubljana. The administrative seat of the municipality is in Videm. The area is part of the traditional region of Lower Carniola. The municipality is now included in the Central Slovenia Statistical Region.

== Settlements ==
In addition to the municipal seat of Videm, the municipality also includes the following settlements:

- Bruhanja Vas
- Cesta
- Četež pri Strugah
- Hočevje
- Kolenča Vas
- Kompolje
- Lipa
- Mala Vas
- Paka
- Podgora
- Podgorica
- Podpeč
- Podtabor
- Ponikve
- Potiskavec
- Predstruge
- Pri Cerkvi–Struge
- Rapljevo
- Tisovec
- Tržič
- Vodice
- Zagorica
- Zdenska Vas
