= Četež pri Strugah =

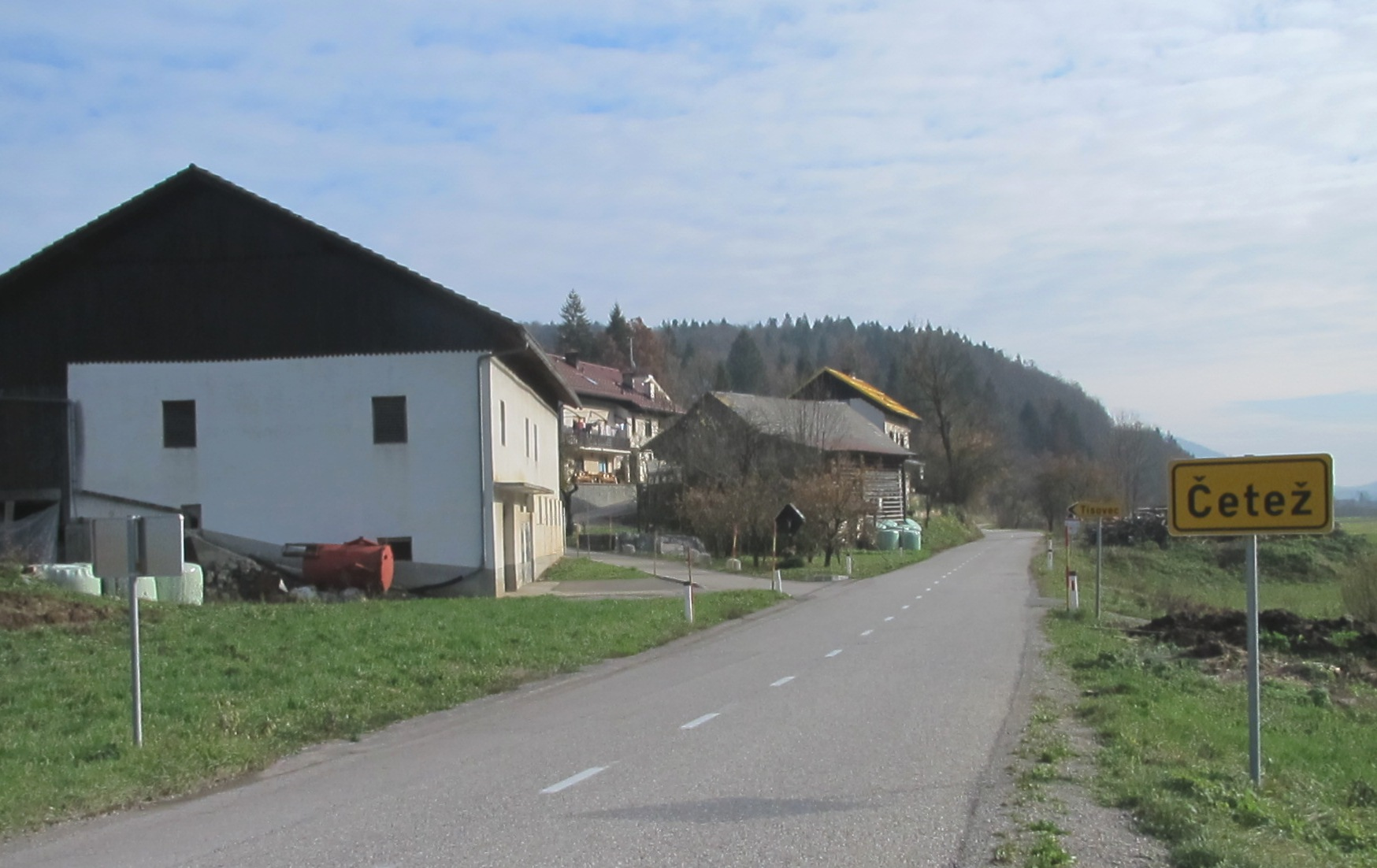

- Location in Slovenia
- Coordinates: 45°47′57.64″N 14°44′59.19″E
- Country: Slovenia
- Traditional region: Lower Carniola
- Statistical region: Central Slovenia
- Municipality: Dobrepolje

Area
  - Total: 1.44 km^{2} (0.56 sq mi)
- Elevation: 437.7 m (1,436 ft)

Population (2020)
  - Total: 73
  - Density: 51/km^{2} (130/sq mi)

Četež pri Strugah (pronounced [ˈtʃeːtɛʃ pɾi ˈstɾuːɡax]) is a small settlement in the Municipality of Dobrepolje in Slovenia. The area is part of the historical region of Lower Carniola. The municipality is now included in the Central Slovenia Statistical Region.

== Name ==
The name of the settlement was changed from Četež to Četež pri Strugah in 1953.
