= Rapljevo =

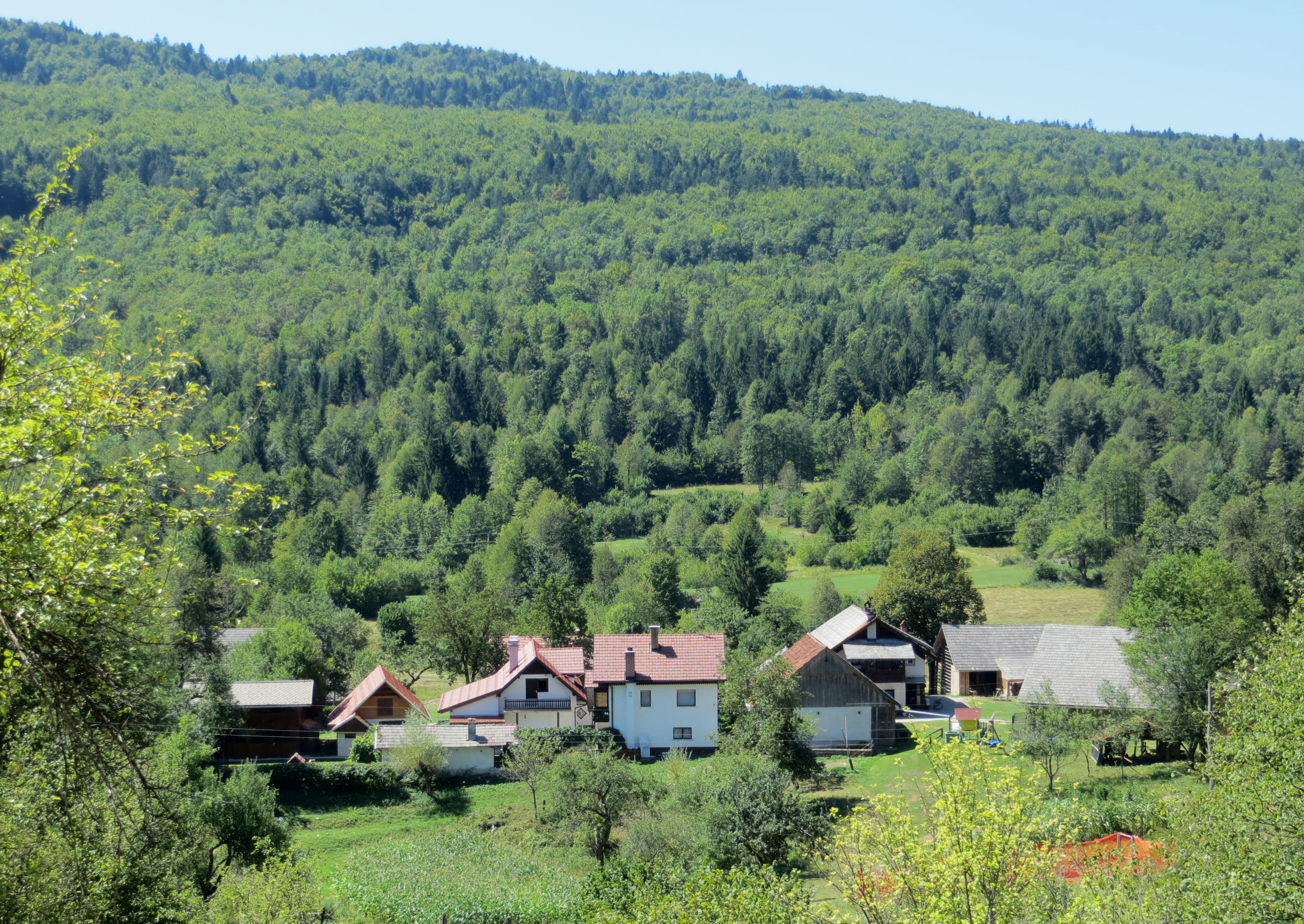

- Location in Slovenia
- Coordinates: 45°46′11.64″N 14°47′6.03″E
- Country: Slovenia
- Traditional region: Lower Carniola
- Statistical region: Central Slovenia
- Municipality: Dobrepolje

Area
  - Total: 15.33 km^{2} (5.92 sq mi)
- Elevation: 427.1 m (1,401 ft)

Population (2020)
  - Total: 61
  - Density: 4.0/km^{2} (10/sq mi)

Rapljevo (pronounced [ˈɾaːpljɛʋɔ]) is a settlement in the southern part of the Municipality of Dobrepolje in Slovenia. The municipality is included in the Central Slovenia Statistical Region. The entire area is part of the historical region of Lower Carniola.
