= Videm, Dobrepolje =

Place in Lower Carniola, Slovenia

Videm
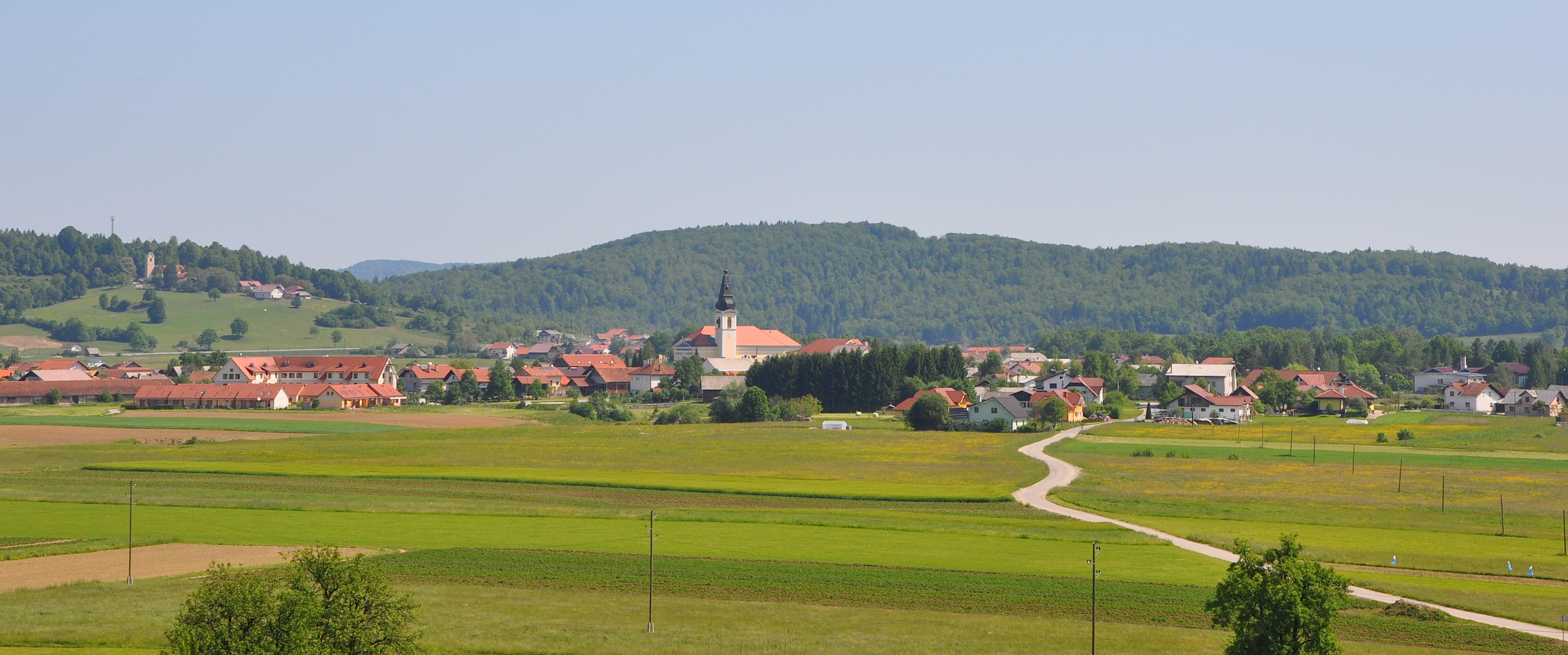

- Location in Slovenia
- Coordinates: 45°50′54.34″N 14°41′40.02″E
- Country: Slovenia
- Traditional region: Lower Carniola
- Statistical region: Central Slovenia
- Municipality: Dobrepolje

Area
  - Total: 2.39 km^{2} (0.92 sq mi)
- Elevation: 442 m (1,450 ft)

Population (2020)
  - Total: 590
  - Density: 250/km^{2} (640/sq mi)

Videm (pronounced [ˈʋiːdəm]; German: Widem) is a village in the Municipality of Dobrepolje in Slovenia. It is the administrative centre of the municipality. The area is part of the historical region of Lower Carniola. The municipality is now included in the Central Slovenia Statistical Region. Videm consists of two hamlets: Mali Videm (literally, 'little Videm') is the core of the settlement around Holy Cross Church, and Veliki Videm (literally, 'big Videm') is located to the northwest, along the road toward Predstruge.

== Geography ==
Videm stands at the northern end of the Dobrepolje karst polje. Gorica Hill (471 m) rises east of the village, and Videm Hill (Slovene: Videmski hrib, 628 m), also known as Little Hill (Slovene: Mali hrib), rises to the west. Three permanent springs known as the Videm Springs (Slovene: Videmski zdenci) are located in the western part of the settlement. There is no railway station in the village and its rail connection is provided by Dobrepolje railway station 1.6 kilometres (0.99 mi) away in Predstruge.

== Name ==
Videm was first attested in written sources in 1355 as ze dem Wydem (and as zu dem Widem in 1436, and an dem Widem in 1444). The name comes from the Slovene common noun videm 'church property', borrowed from Middle High German videme 'church property' (originally, 'property left by the deceased to the church'). In the past the German name was Widem.

== History ==
A part-time school was established in Videm by 1793 in the old sexton's house. This was torn down between 1837 and 1857, and a school building was built at the site. A new school building was built in 1908. The village was burned by German forces during an offensive in the fall of 1943.

== Church ==
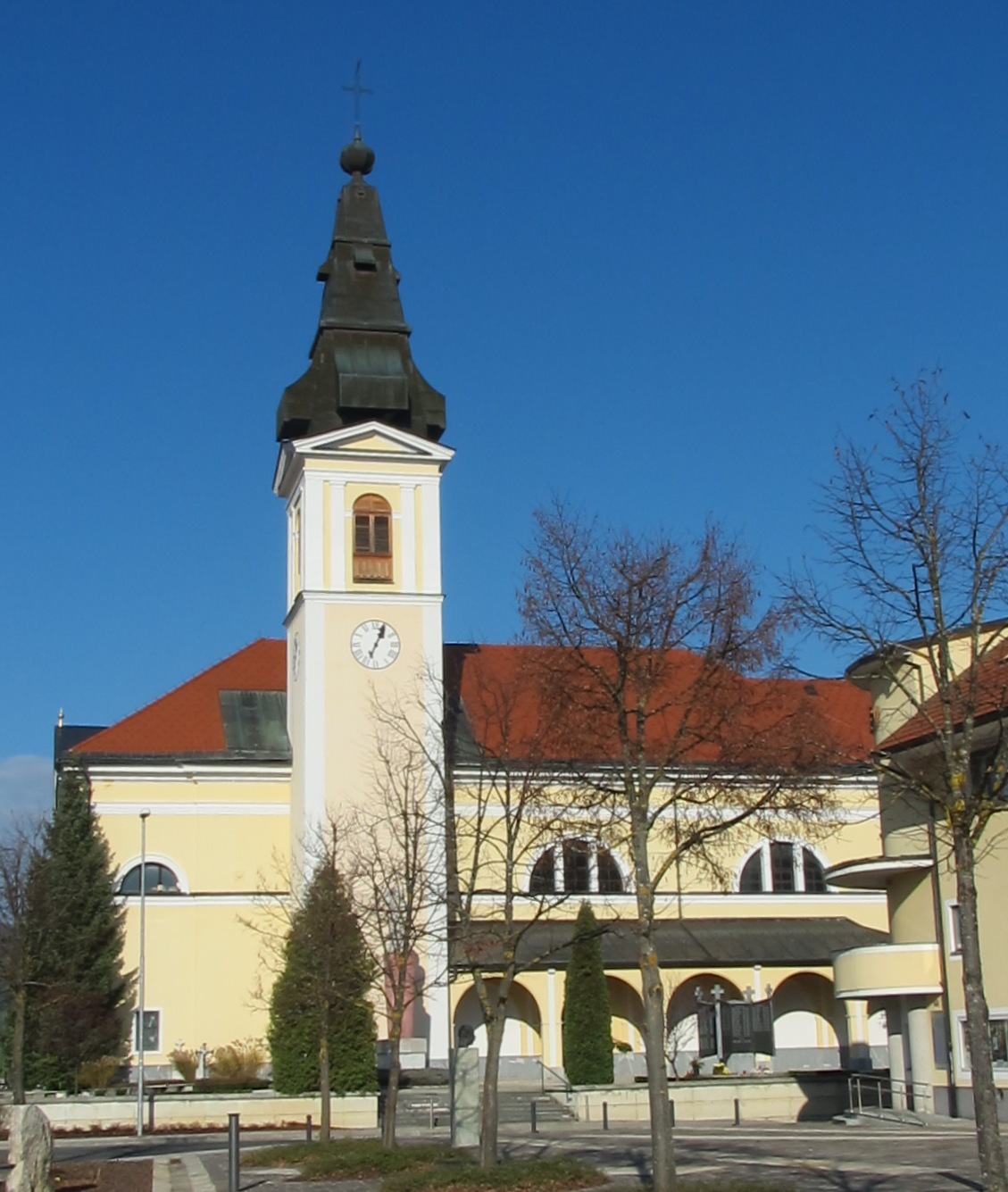
Exaltation of the Holy Cross Church

The local parish church is dedicated to the Exaltation of the Holy Cross and belongs to the Roman Catholic Archdiocese of Ljubljana. It was built in 1844 on the site of a medieval building. The church contains artworks by several Slovene artists, including the wood carver Franz Jontez (1853–1928), the sculptor Ivan Zajec (1869–1952), the painters Matevž Langus (1792–1855) and Štefan Šubic (1820–1884), and the artists Tone Kralj (1900–1975) and France Kralj (1895–1960). The front of the church is decorated with a depiction of the crucifixion above the door and the motto "V tem znamenju boš zmagal" (In hoc signo vinces) in capital letters below a gable stylized as a pediment supported by four pilasters. The church is surrounded by a cemetery.

== Other cultural heritage ==
- A monument to the fallen of the First World War stands south of the church. It is the work of France Kralj.
- A wayside shrine stands southwest of the church. It contains a sculpture of Saints Cyril and Methodius holding a Glagolitic text executed by France Kralj.

== Notable people ==
Notable people that were born or lived in Videm include:

- Anton Klančnik (died 1841), folk poet
- Štefan Primožič (1866–1907), teacher and first director of the Ljubljana deaf-mute institute
- Bernard Tomšič (1811–1856), playwright, writer, and translator
