= List of steam locomotives in Slovenia =

This page is a list of the steam locomotives in Slovenia. Numerous steam locomotives are plinthed across the country. In addition there are locomotives on display at Slovenian Railway Museum.

== List ==
Identity	Other Number(s)	Railway	Builder	Works Number	Built	Wheel Arrangement	Gauge	Location	Notes	Image
JŽ 01-074	SHS 1074		Berliner Maschinenbau AG	7995	1922	2-6-2; 1C1	1,435 mm (4 ft 8 1/2 in)	Moste, Ljubljana		
SŽ 03-002	SB 109.38 DRB 38 4119		WLF Floridsdorf		1914	4-6-0; 2C	1,435 mm (4 ft 8 1/2 in)	Slovenian Railway Museum, Ljubljana		
06-016	SHS 486 316		A Borsig GmbH	12205	1930	2-8-2; 1D1 h2	1,435 mm (4 ft 8 1/2 in)	Slovenian Railway Museum, Ljubljana	Spares for 06-018	
SŽ 06-018	SHS 486 318		A Borsig GmbH	12207	1930	2-8-2; 1D1 h2	1,435 mm (4 ft 8 1/2 in)	Slovenian Railway Museum, Ljubljana	Operational, in use for hauling the museum train	
JŽ 11-023			MAVAG, Budapest	5582	1947	4-8-2; 2D1 h2	1,435 mm (4 ft 8 1/2 in)	Slovenian Railway Museum, Ljubljana		
SŽ 17-006	MAV 342.164; DRB 75 1403		Henschel, Kassel		1917	2-6-2T; 1C1 h2t	1,435 mm (4 ft 8 1/2 in)	Slovenian Railway Museum, Ljubljana		
JŽ 17-086	JDŽ 17-086; MÁV 342 059; SHS 342.059			Bp 4332	1917	2-6-2	1,435 mm (4 ft 8 1/2 in)	Logatec		
JŽ 18-005	BBÖ 629.80; DRB 77 265		Krauss Locomotive Works, Linz	1445	1927	4-6-2T; 2C1 h2t	1,435 mm (4 ft 8 1/2 in)	Dravograd		
JŽ 20-183	SHS 6183		Rheinische Metallwaren- und Maschinenfabrik	526	1922	2-6-0; 1C h2	1,435 mm (4 ft 8 1/2 in)	Trebnje		
JŽ 22-092	MÁV 324.432; JDŽ 22-092		Magyar Államvasutak Gépgyára Budapest (MÁVAG)	3557	1914	2-6-2	1,435 mm (4 ft 8 1/2 in)	Kočevje		
JŽ 24-036	KkStB 170.267		Wiener Neustadt	5315	1916	2-8-0; 1′D n2v	1,435 mm (4 ft 8 1/2 in)	Slovenian Railway Museum, Ljubljana		
JŽ 25-002	SHS 270.202; JDŽ 25-002		Actien Gesellschaft der Lokomotiv-Fabrik vorm. G. Sigl	5721	1922	2-8-0 1′D h2	1,435 mm (4 ft 8 1/2 in)	Celje		
JŽ 25-005						2-8-0 1′D h2	1,435 mm (4 ft 8 1/2 in)	Slovenian Railway Museum, Ljubljana	Spares for 25-026	
JŽ 25-018	BBÖ 270.215; FS 728.008; JDŽ 25-018		Floridsdorf	2711	1921	2-8-0 1′D h2	1,435 mm (4 ft 8 1/2 in)	Črnomelj		
JŽ 25-019	BBÖ 270.150; FS 728.014; JDŽ 25-019		Floridsdorf	2642	1920	2-8-0 1′D h2	1,435 mm (4 ft 8 1/2 in)	Novo Mesto	Worked the last steam hauled service train in Slovenia.	
SŽ 25-026	BBÖ 270.164; FS 728.028		Floridsdorf	2656	1920	2-8-0 1′D h2	1,435 mm (4 ft 8 1/2 in)	Slovenian Railway Museum, Ljubljana	Operational, in use for hauling the museum train	
JŽ 28-006	SHS 80.306; DR 57 383		Actien Gesellschaft der Lokomotiv-Fabrik vorm. G. Sigl	5740	1923	0-10-0 E	1,435 mm (4 ft 8 1/2 in)	Divača		
JŽ 28-029							1,435 mm (4 ft 8 1/2 in)	Slovenian Railway Museum, Ljubljana		
JŽ 29-010	SHS 29-010					2-10-0 1′E h2	1,435 mm (4 ft 8 1/2 in)	Slovenian Railway Museum, Ljubljana		
SŽ 33-037	HDŽ 30-022; JŽ 33-037		Henschel und Sohn	27943	1944	2-10-0; 1′E h2	1,435 mm (4 ft 8 1/2 in)	Slovenian Railway Museum, Ljubljana	Operational, in use for hauling the museum train	
DRB 52 4936	DRB 52 4936; JŽ 33-110		MBA, Berlin	14006	1943	2-10-0; 1′E h2	1,435 mm (4 ft 8 1/2 in)	Pivka Military History Park, Pivka		
JŽ 33-253						2-10-0; 1′E h2	1,435 mm (4 ft 8 1/2 in)	Slovenian Railway Museum, Ljubljana	Spares for 33-037	
JŽ 33-339						2-10-0; 1′E h2	1,435 mm (4 ft 8 1/2 in)	Slovenian Railway Museum, Ljubljana		
JŽ 36-013	prussian G12						1,435 mm (4 ft 8 1/2 in)	Slovenian Railway Museum, Ljubljana		
JŽ 50-060	MÁV 376 227; SHS 376.227		Magyar Államvasutak Gépgyára Budapest (MÁVAG)	2806	1912	2-6-2T; 1C1 h2t	1,435 mm (4 ft 8 1/2 in)	Litija		
JŽ 51-156	MÁV 375.586	MÁV		5218	1941	2-6-2T; 1C1 h2t	1,435 mm (4 ft 8 1/2 in)	Grosuplje		
JŽ 52-011	kkStB 178.204; 178.204; DRB 92 2261; JDŽ 52-011		Krauss Locomotive Works, Linz	7314	1918	0-8-0T; D n2vt	1,435 mm (4 ft 8 1/2 in)	Laško		
JŽ 53-003	BBÖ 378.139		Actien Gesellschaft der Lokomotiv-Fabrik vorm. G. Sigl	5826	1928	2-8-2T; 1D1 h2t	1,435 mm (4 ft 8 1/2 in)	Rogatec		
JŽ 53-017	BBÖ 378.106; DRB 93 1406		StEG	4830	1928	2-8-2T; 1D1 h2t	1,435 mm (4 ft 8 1/2 in)	Murska Sobota		
JŽ 53-019	BBÖ 378.116; DRB 93.1416		Wiener Lokomotiv Fabrk, Floridsdorf	2976	1928	2-8-2T; 1D1 h2t	1,435 mm (4 ft 8 1/2 in)	Naklo		
JŽ 62-019	1433		HK Porter Locomotive Works, USA	7547	1943	0-6-0T	1,435 mm (4 ft 8 1/2 in)	Studenci district of Maribor		
JŽ 62-037	4332		Vulcan Iron Locomotive Works	4494	1943	0-6-0T	1,435 mm (4 ft 8 1/2 in)	Krmelj		
JŽ 62-070	6171	Zagorje coal mine	Vulcan Iron Locomotive Works	4541	1944	0-6-0T	1,435 mm (4 ft 8 1/2 in)	Zagorje ob Savi		
JŽ 62-119		Talum aluminium works	Đuro Đaković	627	1957	0-6-0T	1,435 mm (4 ft 8 1/2 in)	Dobova		
JŽ 62-121			Đuro Đaković	628	1957	0-6-0T	1,435 mm (4 ft 8 1/2 in)	Slovenian Railway Museum, Ljubljana		
JŽ 62-324			Đuro Đaković	324	1953	0-6-0T	1,435 mm (4 ft 8 1/2 in)	Šentjur		
JŽ 62-360	851		Đuro Đaković	360	1953	0-6-0T	1,435 mm (4 ft 8 1/2 in)	Sevnica		
JŽ 62-632		Vipap paper plant, Krško	Đuro Đaković	632	1955	0-6-0T	1,435 mm (4 ft 8 1/2 in)	Mozirje		
SŽ 71-012	ŽJ O-IX; SHS IIIa3 11032		Orenstein & Koppel	10168	1922	0-6-0T; C t	760 mm (2 ft 5 15/16 in)	Slovenian Railway Museum, Ljubljana	Operational, in use in Railway Museum	
JŽ 72-018	SDŽ 362 kukHB IIIc 3155; SHS 11326; JDŽ 72-018	SDŽ	HKrMÜ	5398	1905	0-6-2; C1-n2t	760 mm (2 ft 5 15/16 in)	Slovenske Konjice		
JŽ 97-028						0-6-4 C2′ n2t	760 mm (2 ft 5 15/16 in)	Slovenian Railway Museum, Ljubljana		
Südbahn 406	BBÖ 503.14; GKB 406	Österreichische Südbahn	Wiener Neustädter Lokomotivfabrik	3922	1896	4-4-0; 2′B n2	1,435 mm (4 ft 8 1/2 in)	Slovenian Railway Museum, Ljubljana		
JDŽ 116-002						2-6-2T	1,435 mm (4 ft 8 1/2 in)	Slovenian Railway Museum, Ljubljana		
JŽ 118-005	FS 940.015		Officine Meccaniche Napoli	66	1922	2-8-2T; 1′D1′ h2t	1,435 mm (4 ft 8 1/2 in)	Nova Gorica		
JDŽ 124-004	Südbahn 718; Südbahn 719; SHS 124-004; DRB 53 7152; ÖStB 53.7152; JDŽ 124-004	Österreichische Südbahn	StEG	567	1861	0-6-0 C n2	1,435 mm (4 ft 8 1/2 in)	Slovenian Railway Museum, Ljubljana		
JŽ 125-037	MÁV IIIe 2549; MÁV 326-299; SHS 326.299; HDŽ 125-037	MÁV	Magyar Államvasutak Gépgyára Budapest (MÁVAG)	514	1893	0-6-0T; Cn2	1,435 mm (4 ft 8 1/2 in)	Pragersko	Katica	
JŽ 133-005	kkStb 73.372						1,435 mm (4 ft 8 1/2 in)	Slovenian Railway Museum, Ljubljana		
JDŽ 150-003	kkStB 9769; FS 822.001; SHS 97.069; JDŽ 151-023	kkStB	StEG	2352	1893	0-6-0T; C n2t	1,435 mm (4 ft 8 1/2 in)	Slovenian Railway Museum, Ljubljana		
JŽ 151-001	SHS 1 DRB 98 7041; JŽ 151-001		Wiener Neustädter Lokomotivfabrik	4536	1903	0-6-0T; C t	1,435 mm (4 ft 8 1/2 in)	Maribor		
JŽ 152-006	MÁV 377.138	MÁV	MÁVAG	478	1893	0-6-0T; C t	1,435 mm (4 ft 8 1/2 in)	Slovenian Railway Museum, Ljubljana		
JDŽ 153-004	kkStB 9923; SHS 99.023; MÁV 376,1004; DRB 98 1384; ÖStB 98.1384	k.k. Staatsbahnen	Krauss Locomotive Works, Linz	3973	1899	2-6-0; 1C n2vt	1,435 mm (4 ft 8 1/2 in)	Ruše		
JDŽ 153-006	kkStB 9934; SHS 99.34; DRB 98 1385; Železarni Štore št. 10		Krauss Locomotive Works, Linz	4269	1900	2-6-0T	1,435 mm (4 ft 8 1/2 in)	Slovenian Railway Museum, Ljubljana		
JŽ 153-011	kkStB 99.64; SHS 99.64; DRB 98 1389		Krauss Locomotive Works, Linz	5708	1907		1,435 mm (4 ft 8 1/2 in)	Ajdovščina		
JDŽ 162-001	Südbahn 52; SDZ 162-001	Südbahn	Flor	276	1880	0-4-2T; B1 n2t	1,435 mm (4 ft 8 1/2 in)	Slovenian Railway Museum, Ljubljana		
SHS K3	StLB 3 Stahlwerk Jesenice O-IV	StLB	Krauss Locomotive Works, Linz	2775	1892	0-4-0T; B n2t	760 mm (2 ft 5 15/16 in)	Slovenian Railway Museum, Ljubljana	Gonobitz	
O-I		Jesenice Ironworks	Krauss Locomotive Works, Linz	5570	1907	0-4-0T; B n2t	760 mm (2 ft 5 15/16 in)	Jesenice		
O-II		Jesenice Ironworks	Orenstein & Koppel	6127	1913	0-4-0T; B n2t	760 mm (2 ft 5 15/16 in)	Upper Sava Valley Museum, Jesenice	Stored	
O-V	Witkowitz XIII^{II}	Jesenice Ironworks	Krauss Locomotive Works, Linz	6556	1912	0-4-0T; B n2t	760 mm (2 ft 5 15/16 in)	Upper Sava Valley Museum, Jesenice	Stored	
O-VIII	SHS 3006	Jesenice Ironworks	Orenstein & Koppel	10156	1922	0-6-0T; C n2t	760 mm (2 ft 5 15/16 in)	Upper Sava Valley Museum, Jesenice	Stored	
O-XI	71-023	Jesenice Ironworks	Orenstein & Koppel	10154	1922	0-6-0T; C t	760 mm (2 ft 5 15/16 in)	Zreče		
BBÖ P.3	DRB 99 1003; ÖBB 199.03	Parenzaner Bahn	Krauss Locomotive Works, Linz	1468	1927	0-8-2T; D1 h2t	760 mm (2 ft 5 15/16 in)	Izola		
kkStB U.37		Parenzaner Bahn	Actien Gesellschaft der Lokomotiv-Fabrik vorm. G. Sigl	4867	1908	0-6-2T; C1 n2t	760 mm (2 ft 5 15/16 in)	Koper		
št. 1		Železarna Ravne					1,435 mm (4 ft 8 1/2 in)	Carinthia Museum, Ravne		
Štore 2		Železarna Štore	Henschel, Kassel	17503	1920	0-4-0T; B n2t	600 mm (1 ft 11 5/8 in)	Štore	Stefka	
Štore 5	kukHB RIIIc 138; Jugoles Črnomelj 6 Senovo 1	Železarna Štore	Floridsdorf	2566	1918	0-6-0T; C n2t	600 mm (1 ft 11 5/8 in)	Štore		
Štore 6		Železarna Štore					600 mm (1 ft 11 5/8 in)	Ljubljana		
FS 625.107		Ferrovie dello Stato, Italy	Costruzioni Meccaniche di Saronno	490	1914	2-6-0; 1C h2	1,435 mm (4 ft 8 1/2 in)	Šmartno ob Paki		
FS 740.121		Ferrovie dello Stato, Italy	Officine Meccaniche di Napoli	563	1914	2-8-0; 1D h2	1,435 mm (4 ft 8 1/2 in)	Postojna	Carries plates JŽ 740.121	
LBV-04		TETOL	Đuro Đaković	1904	1964	0-6-0F; C n2f	1,435 mm (4 ft 8 1/2 in)	Moste, Ljubljana	In regular service today.	
SH 1		Hrastnik glass works	Vulcan-Werke	2907	1913	0-8-0T; D n2t	1,435 mm (4 ft 8 1/2 in)	Zidani Most		
