= Ogulin, Črnomelj =

Ogulin
- Location in Slovenia
- Coordinates: 45°27′48.33″N 15°15′3.6″E
- Country: Slovenia
- Traditional region: White Carniola
- Statistical region: Southeast Slovenia
- Municipality: Črnomelj

Area
  - Total: 0.25 km^{2} (0.097 sq mi)
- Elevation: 191.3 m (628 ft)

Population (2023)
  - Total: 37
  - Density: 150/km^{2} (380/sq mi)
- Postal code: 8344

Ogulin (pronounced [ˈoːɡulin]) is a small settlement north of Vinica in the Municipality of Črnomelj in the White Carniola area of southeastern Slovenia. The area is part of the traditional region of Lower Carniola and is now included in the Southeast Slovenia Statistical Region.

== Prominent residents ==
- Leopoldina Bavdek - Poldka (1881–1965), Slovenian teacher, folklorist, and ethnologist
