= Selšček =

- Village
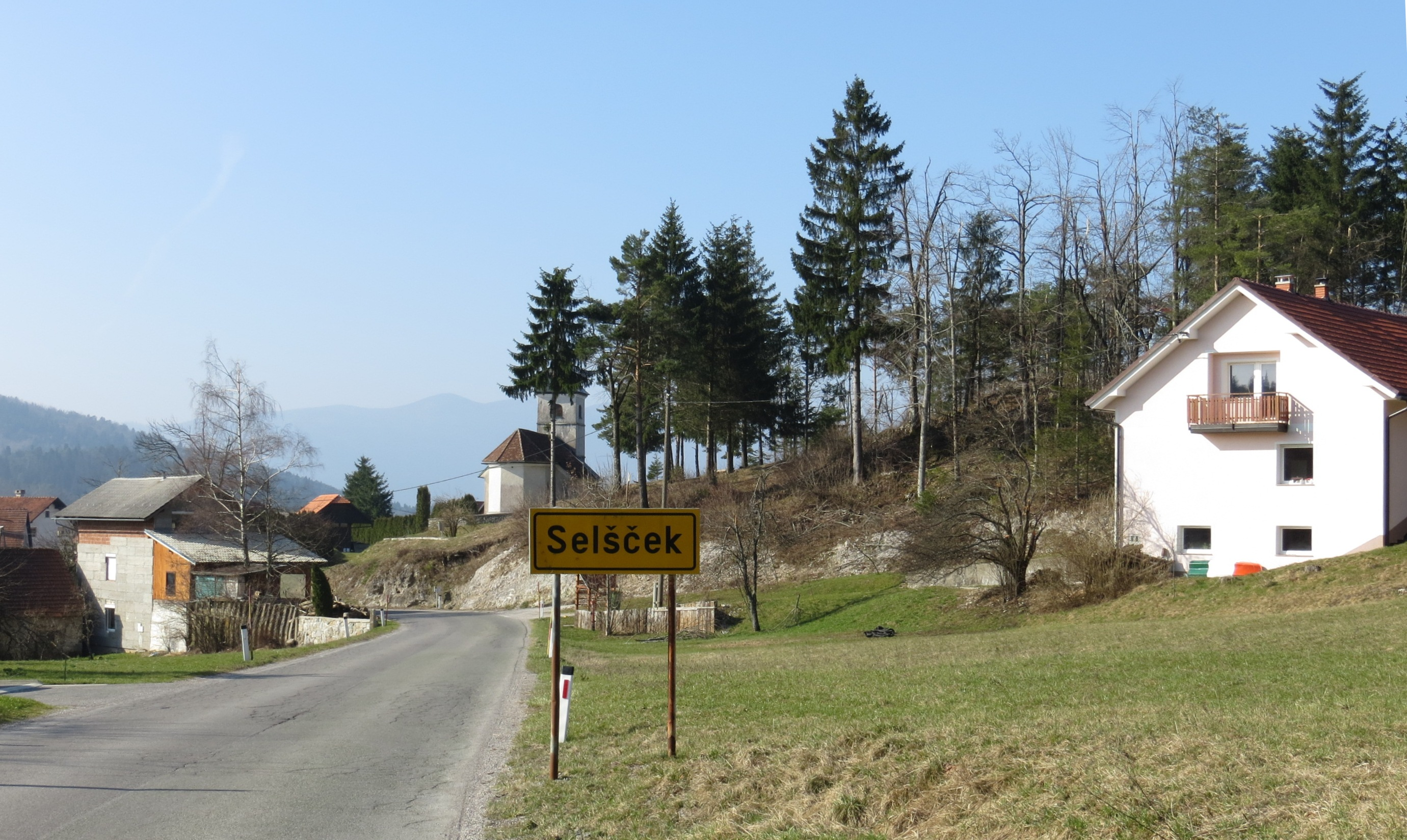

- Location in Slovenia
- Coordinates: 45°49′14.15″N 14°23′49.43″E
- Country: Slovenia
- Traditional region: Inner Carniola
- Statistical region: Littoral–Inner Carniola
- Municipality: Cerknica

Area
  - Total: 2.98 km^{2} (1.15 sq mi)
- Elevation: 642.3 m (2,107 ft)

Population (2020)
  - Total: 152
  - Density: 51.0/km^{2} (132/sq mi)

Selšček (pronounced [ˈseːu̯ʃtʃək]; German: Seuschtschek) is a settlement immediately east of Begunje pri Cerknici in the Municipality of Cerknica in the Inner Carniola region of Slovenia.

== Geography ==
Selšček is a ribbon village on the Menišija Plateau. It lies along the road from Begunje pri Cerknici to Topol pri Begunjah on the southern slope of Bare Peak (Slovene: Goli vrh, 815 m). The Logi Meadow in the village is flood-prone.

== Name ==
Selšček was mentioned in written sources 1260 as Celsach (and as Solzach in 1275, Zelskach in 1285, Shelsach in 1321, Selsacz in 1338, Selczak in 1345, Elsach in 1367, Zelsach in 1379, and Seltschach in 1444). In the past the German name was Seuschtschek.

== History ==
Selšček was recorded in the 13th century as a property of the Carthusian monastery in Bistra. Water mains were installed in the village in 1892, connected to springs with catchment basins below Stražišče Hill (954 m) north of the settlement.

== Church ==
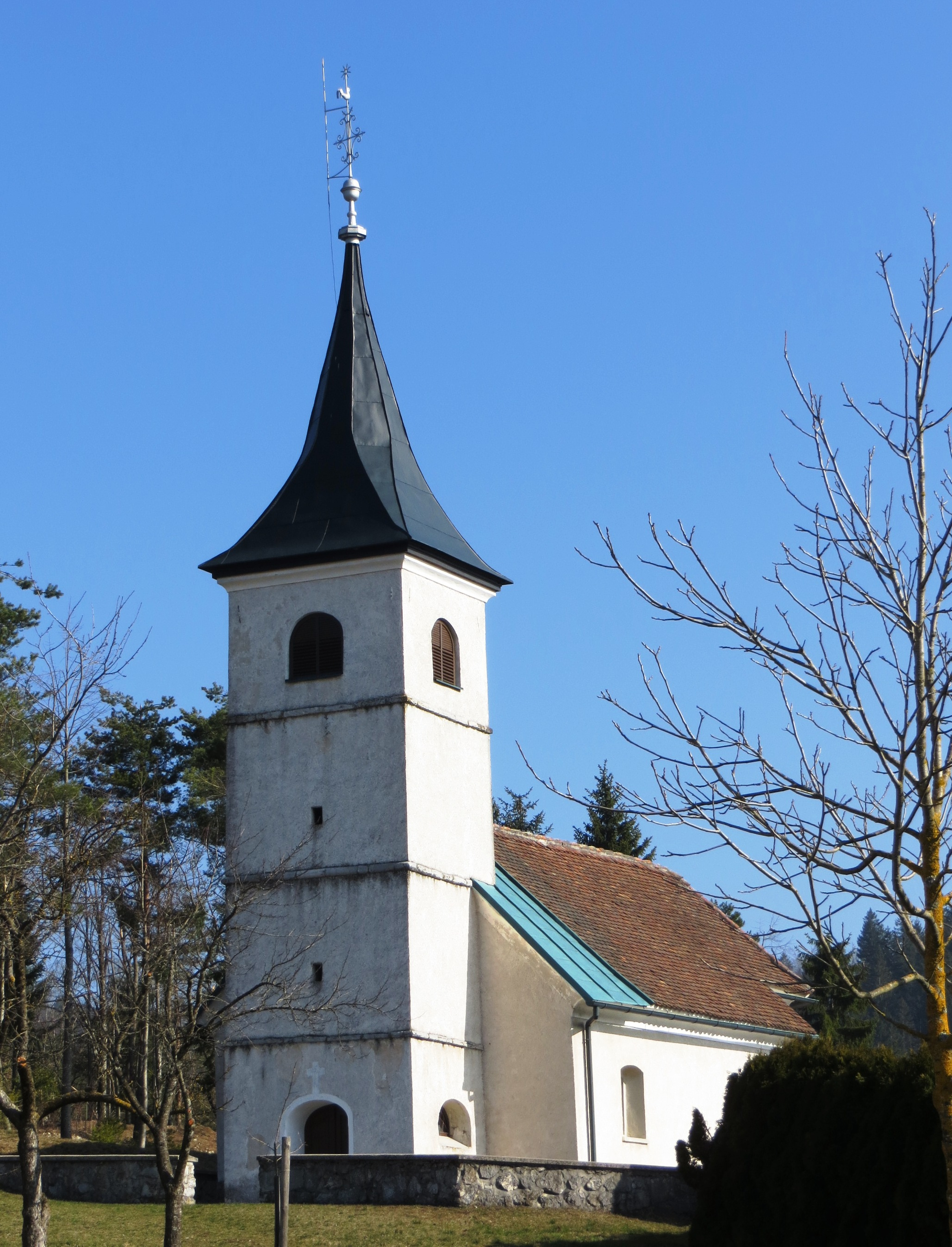
Holy Cross Church

The local church in Selšček is dedicated to the Elevation of the Holy Cross. It is a chapel of ease belonging to the Parish of Begunje pri Cerknici.

== Notable people ==
Notable people that were born in Selšček include:

- Anton Gaspari (1895–1985), children's writer and poet
- Maksim Gaspari (1883–1980), painter and illustrator

== Gallery ==
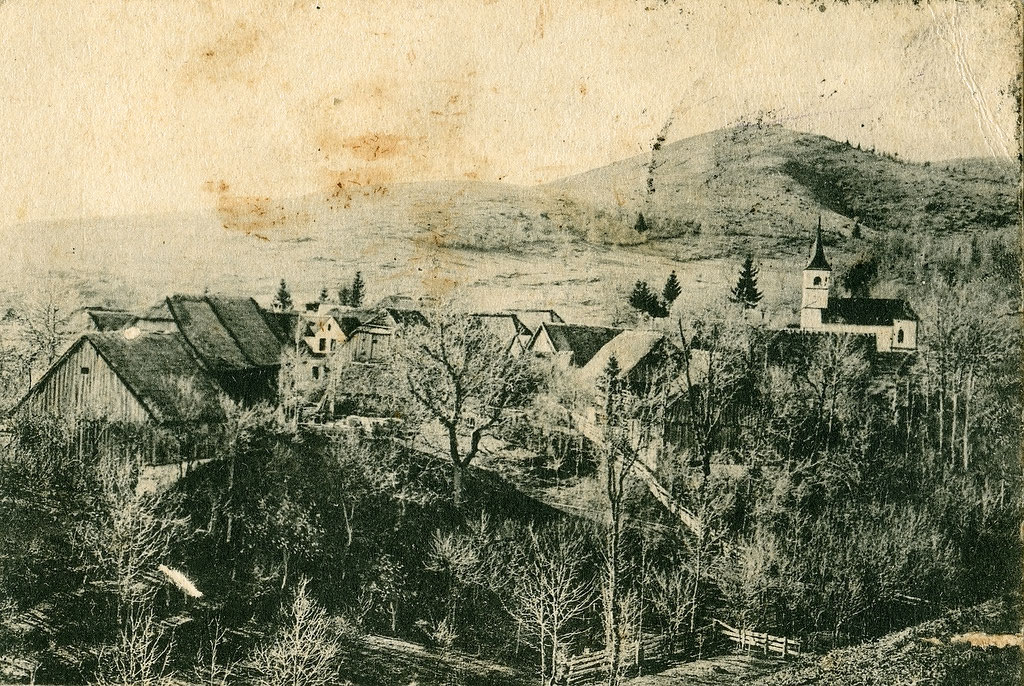
1908 postcard of Selšček
