= Leopoldina Bavdek =

Slovenian teacher, folklorist and ethnologist

Leopoldina Bavdek - Poldka
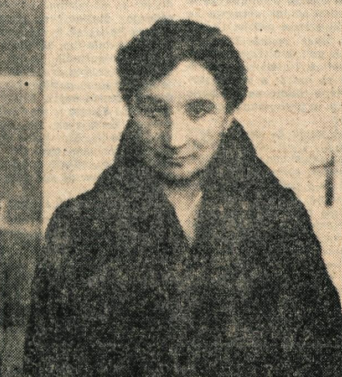
- Born: Leopoldina Bavdek; March 23, 1881; Krško, Austria-Hungary
- Died: June 12, 1965 (aged 84); Ogulin, Yugoslavia
- Occupations: teacher, folklorist, ethnologist

Leopoldina Bavdek, also known as Poldka Bavdek, (23 March 1881 – 12 June 1965) was a Slovenian teacher, folklorist, and ethnologist. She was an important collector and researcher of Slovenian folk art, especially that done by women.

== Early life and education ==
Leopoldina Bavdek was born on 23 March 1881 in Krško into a Slovenian family. She attended the four-grade primary school in Krško, which she completed with distinction in 1893. She later attended and completed a lower secondary school in Ljubljana. She then enrolled at the teacher training college in Gorizia, where she graduated in 1900.

== Career ==
In 1900, she obtained her first teaching job in Stari trg ob Kolpi, where she worked for one year. In 1901, she was appointed as a teacher in Vinica, where she remained until her retirement. In 1902, she passed the professional teaching examination in Gorizia for primary schools with Slovenian and German as languages of instruction. Soon after arriving in Vinica, the head teacher inspired her to engage in traditional embroidery. She began teaching her pupils the folk embroidery of White Carniola and later presented a paper on the subject at a regional teachers’ conference in Črnomelj. She organized a small exhibition of school handicrafts featuring traditional ornamentation, which was well received. For her work in introducing new forms of needlework into schools, she was officially commended and financially rewarded by the Higher School Council.

She encouraged other teachers in White Carniola, mostly women, to introduce traditional embroidery into their schools through her articles and lectures. She collaborated with Slovenian landowner and folk art collector Zofija Kapelle Haring and frequently visited her and her daughter, the poet Olga Haring. In 1913, she met Russian soprano singer and ethnologist Yevgeniya Paprits Linevna (1854–1919), with whom she later collaborated on the research of folk songs and the recording of some of the earliest sound recordings in Slovenia.

She systematically collected traditional embroidery patterns across Slovenian villages, documenting them by locality and technique. Based on her material, ethnologist Albert Franc Sič produced and published drawn embroidery templates. However, these focused mainly on ornamentation rather than technique, prompting her to prepare a supplementary collection demonstrating correct embroidery procedures. This collection circulated throughout Carniola, Styria, Gorizia, and Carinthia. She also produced embroidered works herself and exhibited them widely. Additionally, she recorded customs, traditions, and folk fairytales from Vinica and its surroundings.

== Later life and death ==
She retired in 1937. In recognition of her contributions to preserving folk art, the Museum Society in Metlika appointed her an honorary member. She donated her extensive ethnographic collection to the Bela Krajina Museum. She never married and had no children. She died in 1965 in Ogulin.
