= Maksim Gaspari =

Slovene painter (born 1883)

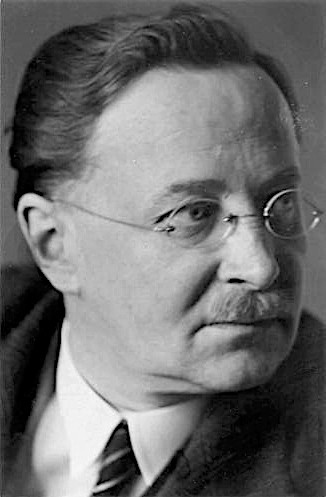
- Born: 26 January 1883; Selšček, Duchy of Carniola, Austria-Hungary
- Died: 14 November 1980 (aged 97); Ljubljana, SR Slovenia
- Education: Academy of Fine Arts Vienna
- Known for: painting
- Notable work: Painting and illustration
- Awards: Levstik Award; 1949 for Čuri-Muri velikan Prešeren Award; 1953 for his achievements in painting

Maksim Gaspari (26 January 1883 – 14 November 1980) was a Slovene painter best known for his paintings and illustrations as well as numerous postcards with folklore motifs and scenes from rural life.

Gaspari was born in Selšček above Cerknica in Inner Carniola in 1883. He studied drawing at the Academy of Fine Arts Vienna but was unable to support himself financially, so he returned to Kamnik, where he lived before going to Vienna. There he often visited the poet and landowner Olga Haring and her mother Zofija Kapelle Haring (1843–1929), a landowner and collector of ethnic embroidery, painted Easter eggs, and other folk art. Later, he studied in Munich for a while and settled in Ljubljana in 1913, where he taught art. He died in Ljubljana in 1980.

Gaspari is today best known for his postcards with rural motifs and greetings as well as political messages. A collection of his postcards is held by the National and University Library in Ljubljana. He also illustrated numerous books and journals. He won the Levstik Award in 1949 for his illustrations of Korney Chukovsky's Čuri-Muri velikan (The Monster Cockroach). In 1953 he received the Prešeren Award for his achievements in painting.

From 1972 he was a regular member of the Slovenian Academy of Sciences and Arts.
