= Slovenian Railway Museum =

Railway Museum of Slovenian railways
- Železniški muzej Slovenskih železnic
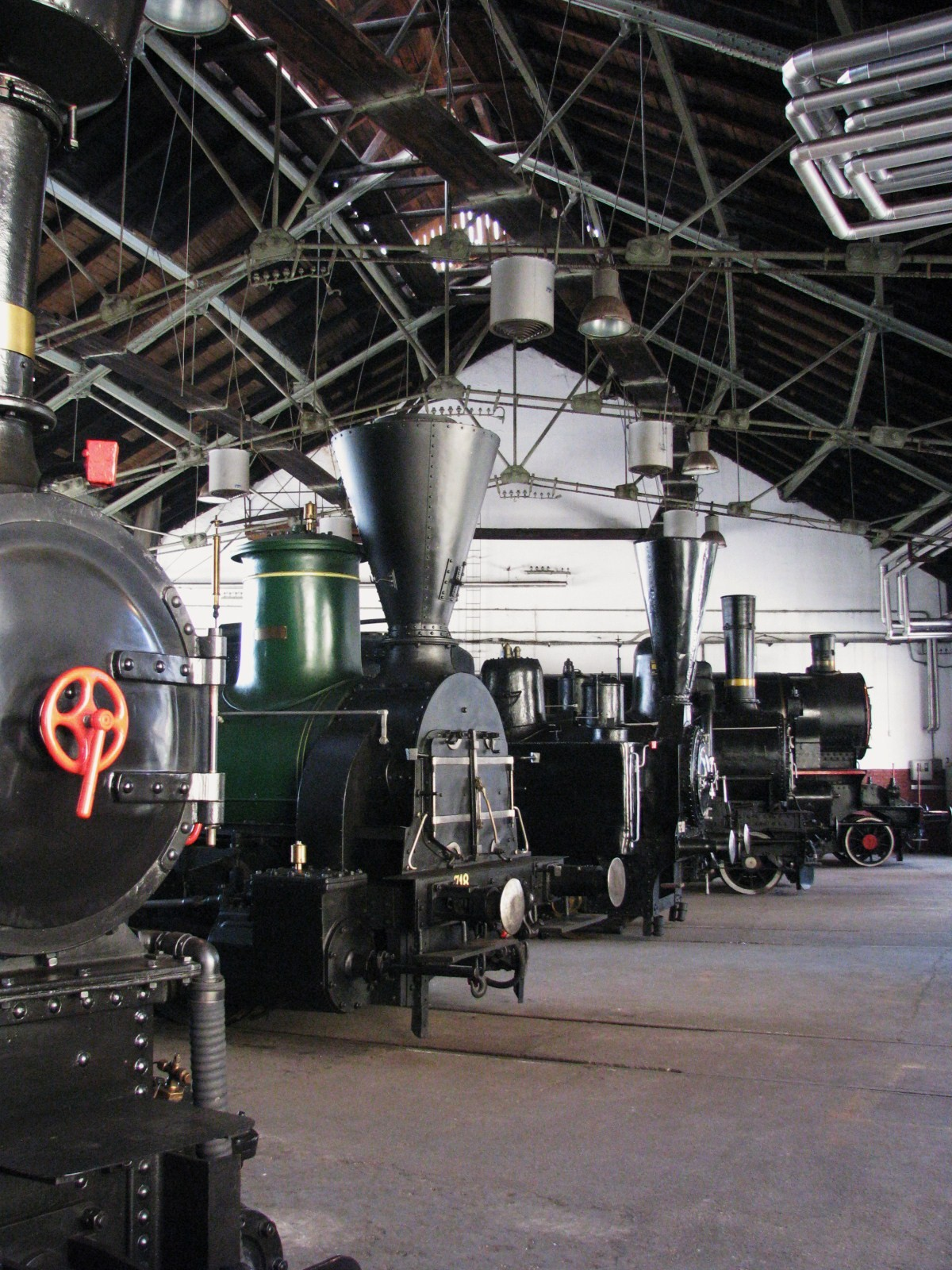
- Inside the roundhouse

- Location within Ljubljana
- Established: 1996
- Location: Parmova 35; 1000 Ljubljana
- Coordinates: 46°03′45″N 14°30′12″E
- Type: Railway museum
- Public transit access: Ljubljana railway station
- Website: Railway Museum of Slovenian railways

The Slovenian Railway Museum, or Railway Museum of Slovenian railways (Slovene: Železniški muzej Slovenskih železnic), in Ljubljana, Slovenia, located on Parmova ulica 35, is the national museum for Slovenia's railway history.

The museum is tasked with acquiring, preserving and supplying knowledge about Slovenian railway history on the basis of the national collection. It is owned by Holding Slovenske Zeleznice, and is located in front of the former Ljubljana Šiška Railway station.

== History ==
The notion of documenting the history of Slovene railways was born in the 1960s when it was becoming clear that the era of the steam locomotive was drawing to a close. If this was late in the day, it was because a decision had been made after WW2 to make Belgrade the base for railway museum activities for the whole Yugoslavia, a choice that led later to the establishment of the Belgrade Railway Museum.

When the railwayman and woman of Slovenia elected to establish a museum of their own, they chose for its location the former locomotive shed at Ljubljana Siska. In its formative years, historic vehicles were temporarily displayed only in the 'roundhouse', a semicircular shed forming the centrepiece of the depot. This shed itself had been listed as part of the cultural heritage.

In 1996, the year that marked the 150th anniversary of the advent of railways in Slovenia, the Museum of the Slovenian Railways presented to the public a permanent display of its most important railway artefacts. This was housed in the former railway training school in Kurilniška Street, close by the main site of the museum. The building, however, was old and in a ruinous state. With its demolition in 2002, the display had to be closed to the public for the duration.

It reopened on a newly acquired site next to the roundhouse in 2004. As before, the display introduces visitors to the main spheres of railway activity. Aided by its maps and illustrations, visitors can trace the whole development of Slovenia's railway network.

== Communications ==
Sound, sight and written communication systems played key roles in ensuring the safe operation of trains between stations. The newly invented electric telegraph was swiftly introduced to the railways. In 1876, the telephone was added. Later teleprinter took place of the telegraph. In 1963, the radio-telegraph as introduced to Slovenian railways as its operations centres were equipped with the required transmitters and receivers.

The need for accurate timing presented itself only with the beginning of the railways in order to respond to the demand for regular and punctual traffic. The clocks on the posts along the railway line were regulated each day at noon to the signal given by the telegraph. On stations there is a main clock which controls the rest of the clocks by means of electricity so they all show exactly the same time.

== Rolling stock ==
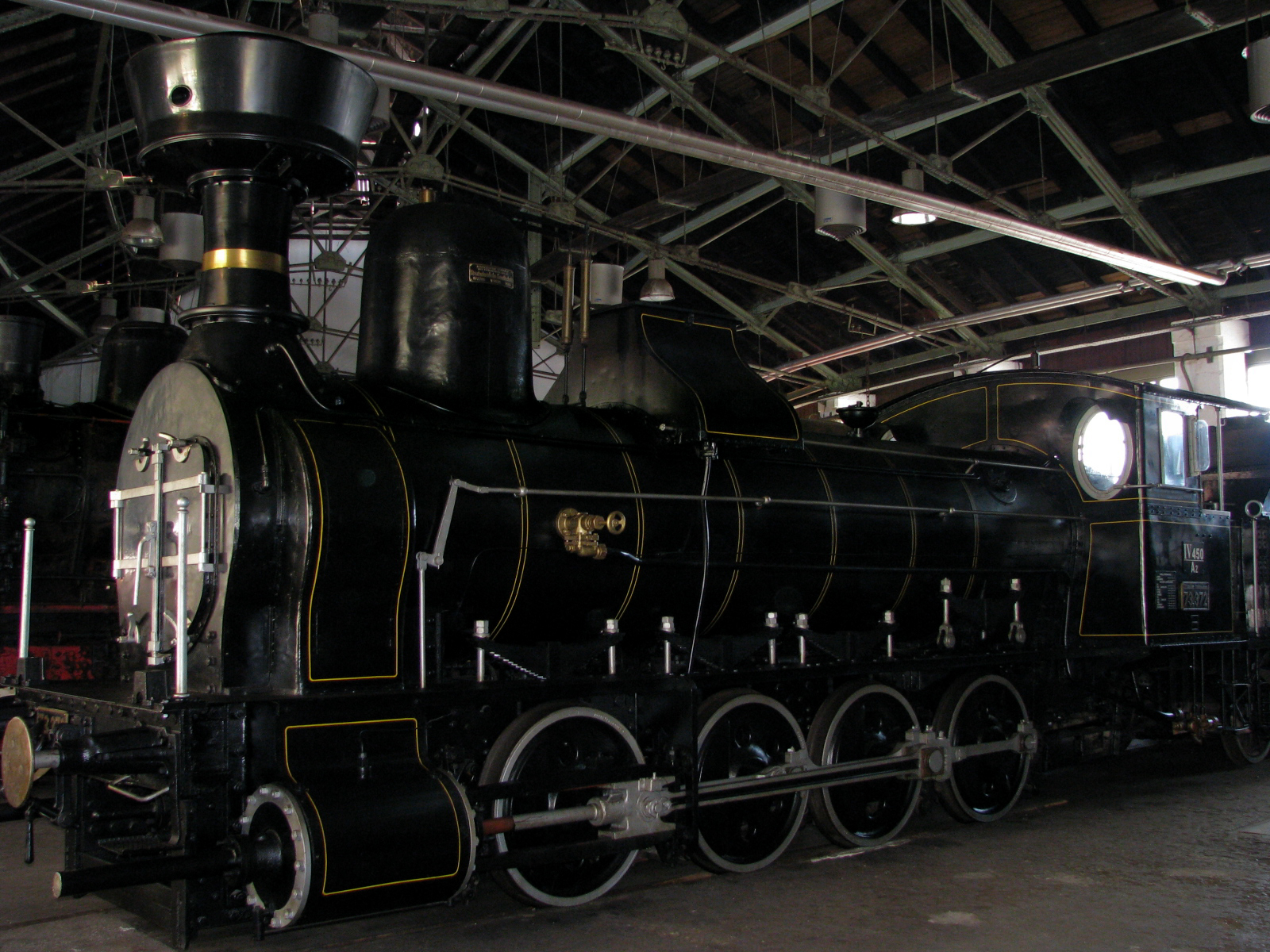
One of the exhibited locomotives

The most prominent element of the railway is its rolling stock, especially its locomotives. Steam locomotives, which made the development of railways possible, first appeared in the early years of the 19th century. They reigned supreme for more than 150 years. Throughout this time, they were continually developed and improved. The extensive museum collection includes more than sixty locomotives and fifty other vehicles. Only the most important are on display.

The oldest locomotive is the former Southern Railway No. 29.718, built in 1861. Keeping her close company is the diminutive No. 162-001. Her huge chimney earned her the nickname 'the Kamnic Cornet'. Next is the most eminent of the engines, express locomotive No. 03-002, designed in 1910 particularly for the Ljubljana-Trieste line. Nearby is mighty No. 06-018 of 1930, also designed especially for lines in Slovenia. The smallest of all is No. K3, a little gem built in 1892 especially for the narrow gauge Poljčane - Slovenske Konjice Line.

== Signalling and Safety Equipment ==
Signalling apparatus and all the safety equipment associated with it allows rail travel to be speedy and safe. It protects trains when they are stationary and in motion. It ensures that points and signals are correctly set for their passage.

Around 1900, electromechanical signalling and safety equipment was introduced. It has two essential controls. First is the lever frame at its base. This houses the levers used to change the positions of the points and signals. Second, and above the lever frame, are the indicator panels. These hold the electric block repeaters that maintain communication with the main control frame in the stationmaster's office, from which route orders for trains are despatched. The stationmaster's and the signalmen's apparatus is interlocked to ensure that mistakes cannot occur.

== Station Master's Office ==
The station master's office is a key part of the railway station. It is the place where the traffic officer, the station 'chief', sees that all that is required to ensure the safe and regular operation of the trains is carried out. Using his signalling equipment, the traffic officer transmits order to his more remote signalmen about how the points and signals are to be set. In the past, the connections to adjoining stations needed to operate the trains were by telegraph. With the passage of time, the telephone and other modern telecommunication devices were introduced to assist him. On top of all this, he also saw to the ticket sales.

== Development, Construction and Maintenance ==
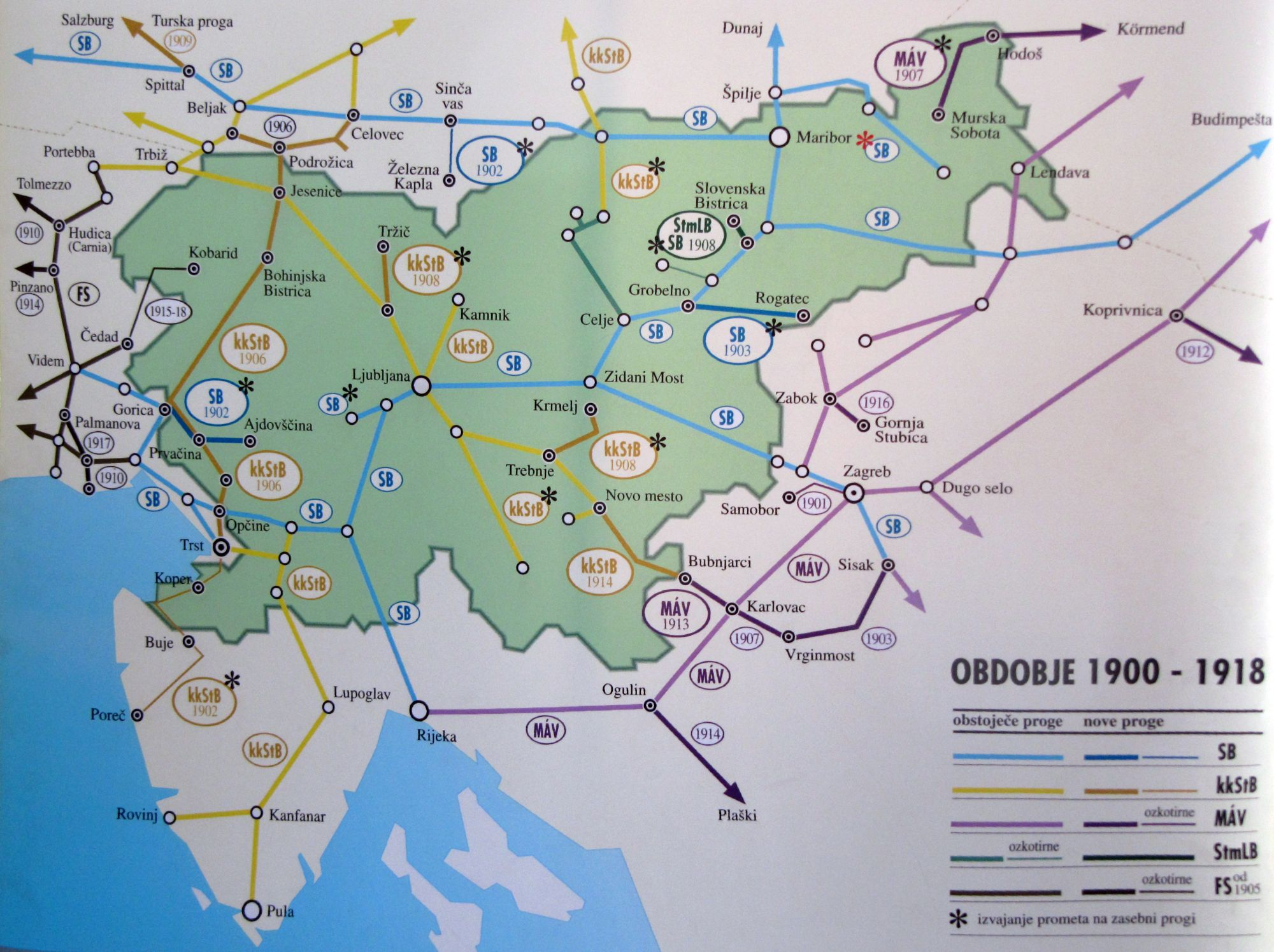
Railways in and around Slovenia by 1918

The development of Slovenia's railway network is depicted with seven maps, each relating to a distinctive era. Historic boundary stones, engraved with the individual railway companies, bear witness in the display to each period. In their time, they marked the ownership of the land where the track was laid.

Railway vehicles characteristically operate on special tracks, known as the 'permanent way'. Such tracks make it possible, for some effort, to transport loads several times heavier than normal roads would allow. Over time, calls for ever-heavier vehicles and greater speed demanded the development of stronger track. This involved changes in the size of the rails and in the ways in with they were secured, and in the sleepers, where wood gave way in some places to steel and, finally, concrete.

The gangs that maintained the permanent way used a range of tool and vehicles. The small trolleys employed to maintain the track and carry their equipment and material were allowed to travel on the ine only by special arrangement.

== Uniforms ==
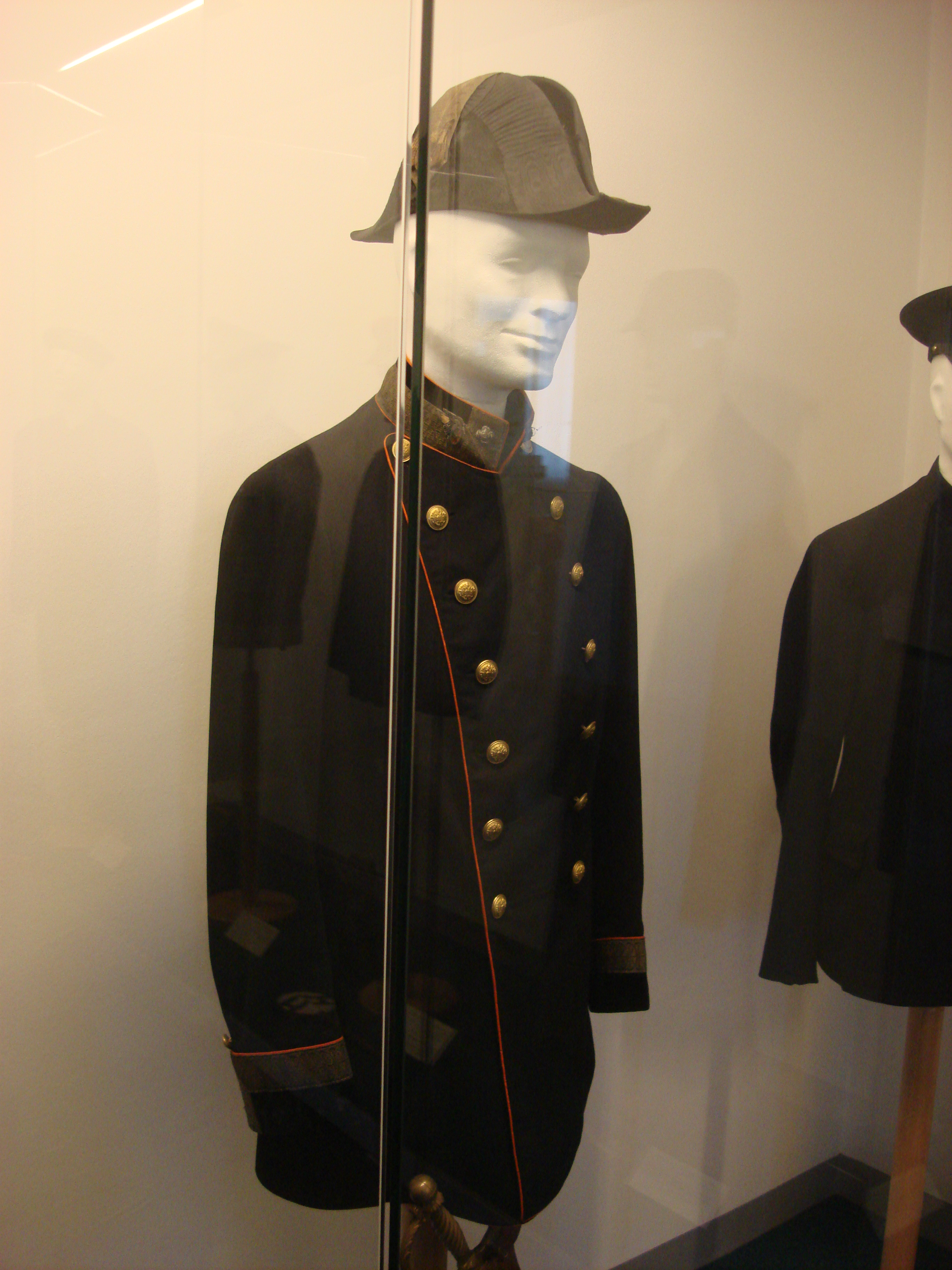
Full dress uniform of the kkStB

Uniforms, 'garments of honour', were introduced in the early days of the railways so the railway employees could be distinguished from passengers. They differed from company to company. In Slovenia, until 1952, they also indicated employees' rank. Until 1927, on special occasions, higher-ranking officials wore full-dress uniforms.

Railwaymen were always provided with the smaller items of equipment needed for their work. These varied little over the years.

== See also ==
- List of transport museums
- List of steam locomotives in Slovenia
