= Studenci District =

Coordinates: 46°33′11″N 15°37′00″E

The Studenci District (pronounced [stuˈdɛːntsi]; Slovene: Mestna četrt Studenci) is a city district of the City Municipality of Maribor in northeastern Slovenia. Notable landmarks include the Carinthian Bridge, which crosses the Drava River.

== Name ==
Studenci was first attested in written sources around 1100 with the German name Brunndorf. The name Studenci derives from the Slovene word studenec, and the German name Brunndorf from Brunnen, both meaning 'well'.

== History ==
After the Second World War, a Yugoslav labor camp for political prisoners operated in Studenci until March 1946.

== Church ==
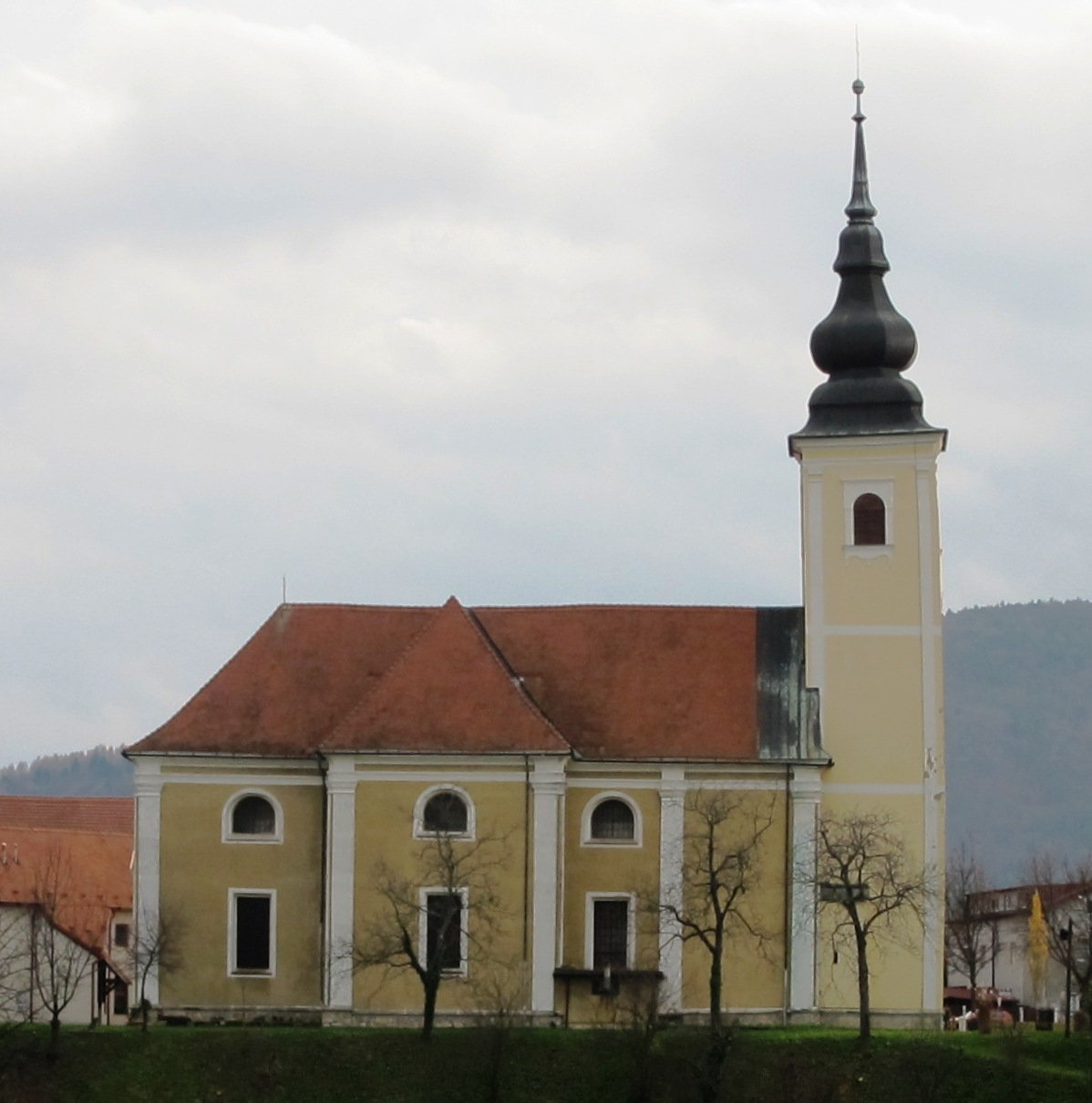
St. Joseph's Church

The church in Studenci is dedicated to Saint Joseph. It stands on the right bank of the Drava River, bounded by the river to the north and by Bank Street (Slovene: Obrežna ulica) and Ruše Street (Slovene: Ruška cesta) to the south. It is a single-nave church that was built between 1726 and 1728. An older church, dating to 1675, previously stood at the site. The church's somewhat bended bell tower dates from 1742–43. The chancel and the oratory are 1764 works by the Maribor architect Johann Nepomuk Fuchs (1727–1804) and the pulpit, also dating to 1764, is the work of Jožef Holzinger (1735–1797). Other Baroque furnishings by Holzinger and Jožef Straub (1712–1756) were replaced by neo-Renaissance works after 1900. Of the main altar, work by Straub, only statues have been preserved in the Maribor Regional Museum. The chancel was redesigned in 1972 according to plans by the architect Ciril Zazula, whereas the altar has been replaced by a tapestry by the painter Ida Brišnik Remec.
