= John Jager =

Slovene–American architect (1871–1959)

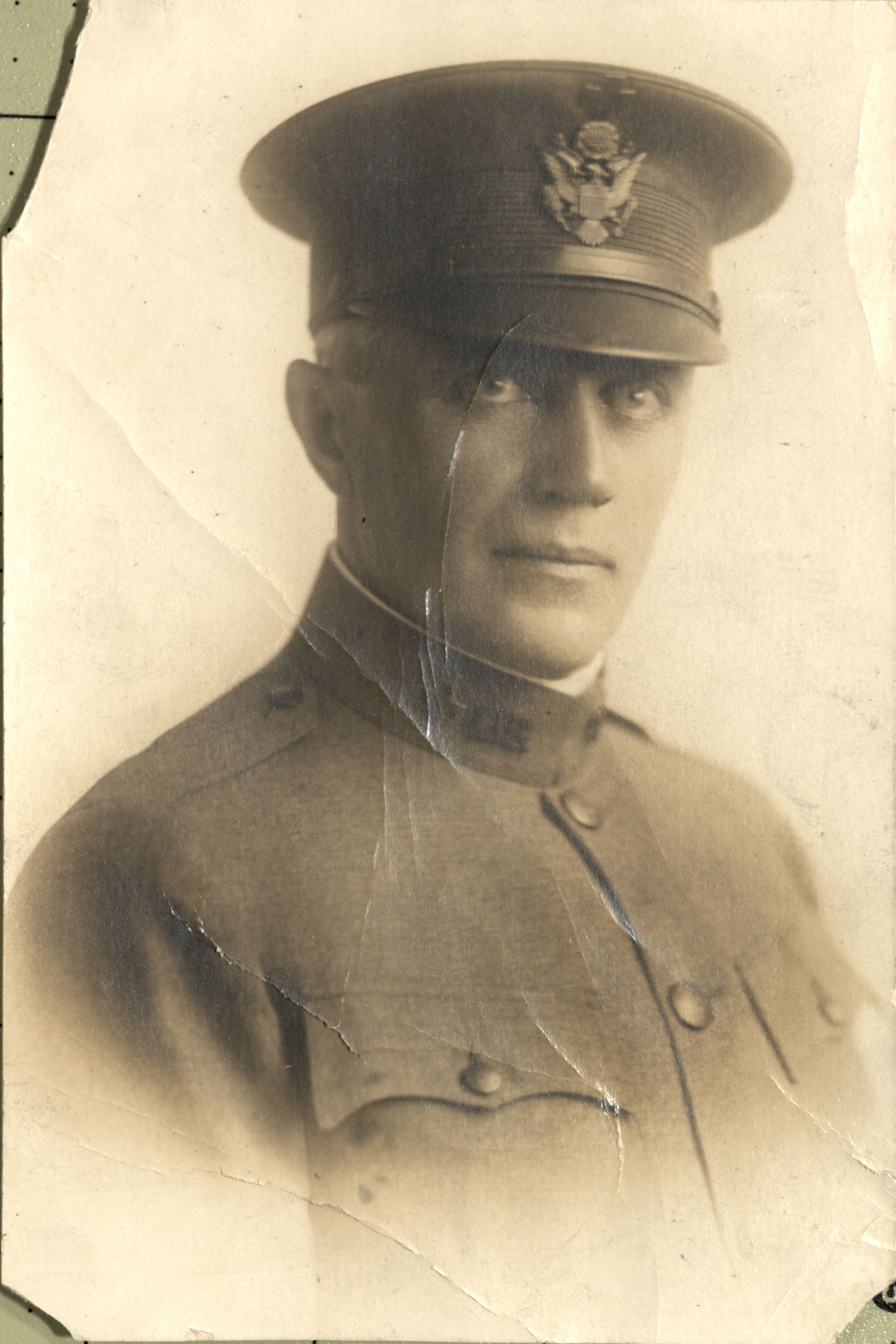
- Born: May 16, 1871; Bistra, Austria-Hungary
- Died: October 31, 1959 (aged 88); Minneapolis, Minnesota
- Occupation: Architect

John Jager (Slovenized: Ivan Jager; May 16, 1871 – October 31, 1959) was a Slovene–American architect and urban planner.

John Jager was born in Bistra, Austria-Hungary (now Slovenia) at Railway Guard House 365A above the village, where his father worked as a railway guard. He was baptized Johann Jager.

He graduated from high school in Ljubljana in 1892, after which he studied architecture at the Vienna University of Technology under Joseph Maria Olbrich and Otto Wagner. In 1898, he toured Lower Carniola, Pivka, the Vipava region, and the Karst Plateau, where he collected folk motifs to decorate the National Café (Slovene: Narodna kavarna) in Ljubljana. In Vienna, he worked as an assistant to Max Fabiani and met Avgusta Šantel. He graduated from the University of Vienna in 1900. In 1901, he went to Beijing at the invitation of the Austrian government to build shelters for its soldiers during the Boxer Rebellion. He emigrated to the United States in 1902. In 1918, Jager traveled to Serbia, where he worked as an inspector for a Red Cross unit in charge of rebuilding 60 villages damaged during the First World War; for this work he was made a Red Cross captain, and in 1940 he was awarded the Order of the Yugoslav Crown. Jager lived in Minneapolis, Minnesota, where he died in 1959.

== Works ==
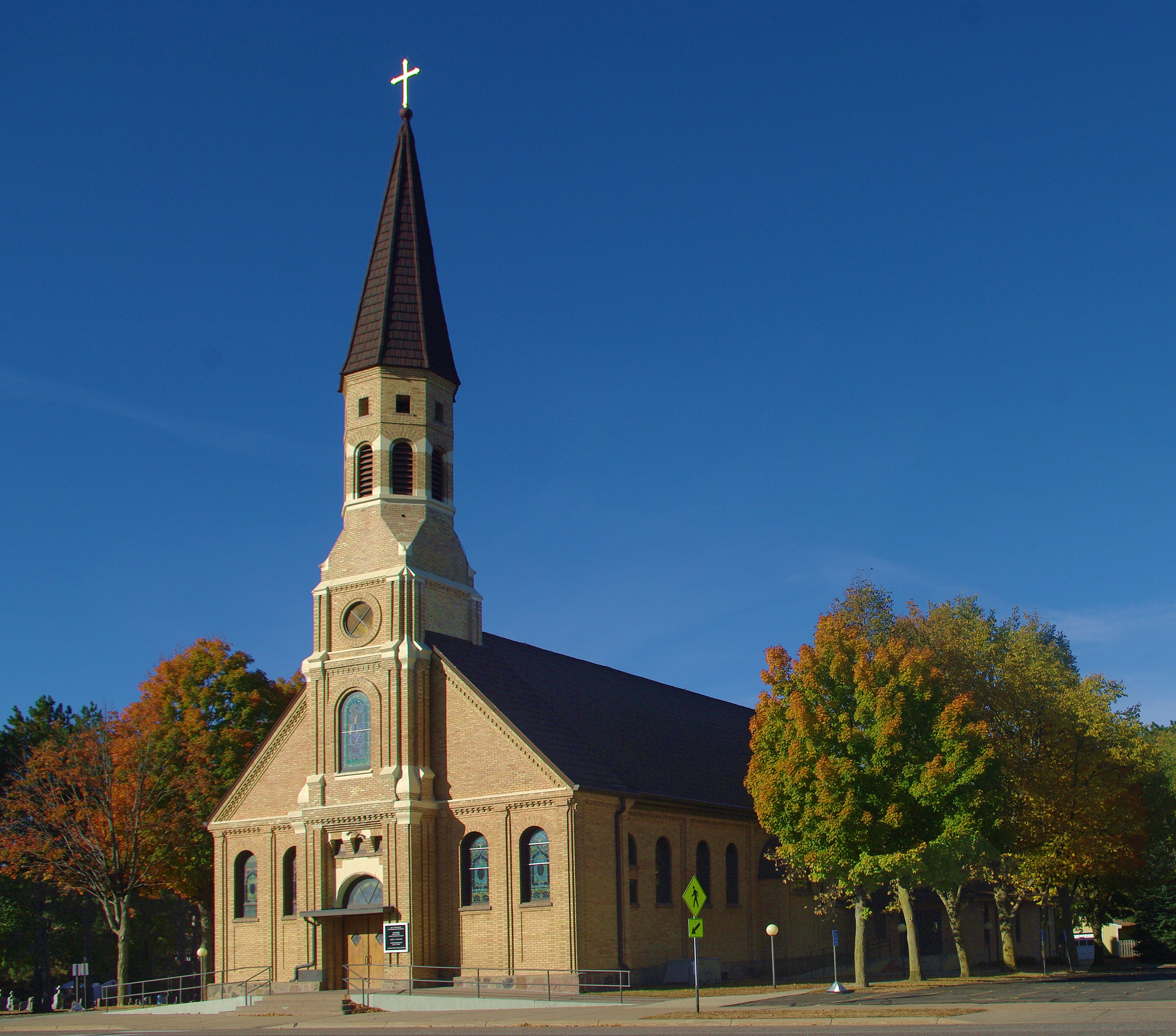
Saint Stephen's Catholic Church in St. Stephen, Minnesota

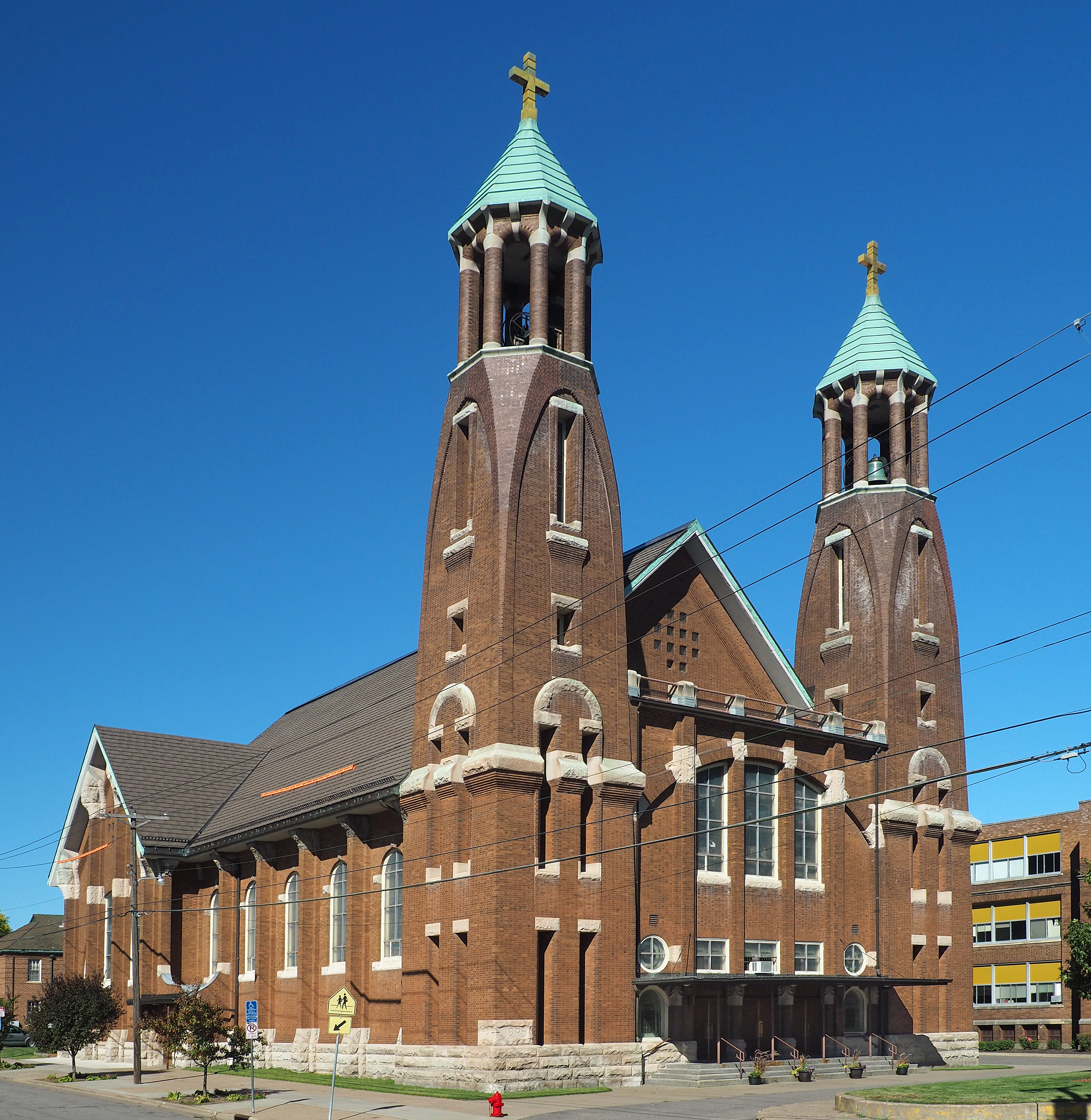
Saint Bernard's Catholic Church in Saint Paul, Minnesota, built 1905–1914

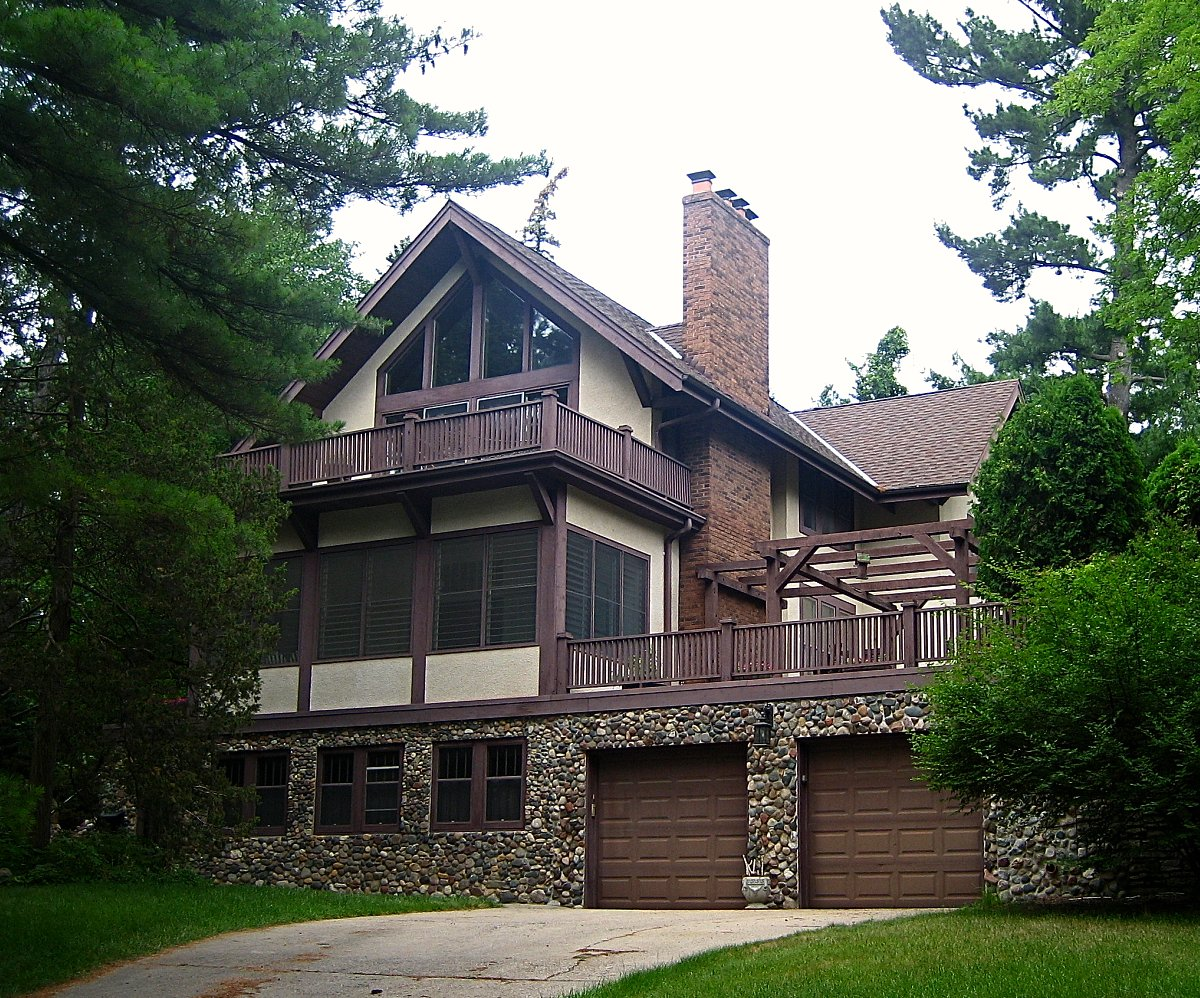
House at 6 Red Cedar Lane, Minneapolis, Minnesota, built in 1904
