= Olga Haring =

- Born: 18 May 1866; Črnomelj, now Slovenia
- Died: 1943 (aged 76–77); Črnomelj, now Slovenia
- Occupations: landowner, landlady, poet

Olga Haring (18 May 1866 – 1943) was a Slovenian landowner and poet.

== Childhood ==
She was born into a wealthy Slovenian family on 18 May 1866 in Črnomelj. Her mother, Zofija Kapelle (1843–1929), was a large landowner and landlady, a collector of national embroidery, painted Easter eggs, and other folk artefacts, and a patriot. Her father was Teodor Haring, whom her mother had been forced to marry at the age of nineteen by her father; he later abandoned her mother and disappeared to America before Olga's birth. She had an older brother who died at the age of six in 1869. Olga wished to become a teacher, and after completing elementary education she attended a teachers' training college run by the Ursuline nuns in Ljubljana. She and her mother appear together in one of the oldest private photographs in Slovenia, taken around 1880 by Josip Nikolaj Sadnikar.

== Illness ==
While still young, she fell ill and was therefore forced to leave the teachers' college. Later, as a result of illness, she became blind. She remained with her mother, and the two supported themselves by renting out property. Her mother's house, the Viniški Manor at Suhi most in Črnomelj, was a gathering place for nationally conscious Slovenes. Among their visitors were the teacher and ethnologist Leopoldina Bavdek – Poldka, who also collaborated with her mother; the veterinarian and collector of antiquities and artworks Josip Nikolaj Sadnikar; the painter Ferdo Vesel, husband of painter Jessie Case Vesel; the painter Maksim Gaspari; and the publicist and ethnographer Božo Račič. In 1913, they were also visited by the Russian soprano singer and ethnologist Yevgeniya Paprits Linyevna (1854–1919).

== Literary work ==
She was engaged in writing poetry. Because of her blindness, she dictated her poems. One notebook of her poems has been preserved. A selection of her poems was published in the book In Črnomelj They Have Always Been Merry … (V Črnomlju od nekdaj bili so veseli ...) by the ethnologist Marjetka Balkovec Debevec, published in 2008.

== Later life and death ==
After her mother's death in 1928, she inherited her estate. She never married and had no children. She died in early 1943 in Črnomelj.
