= Predstruge =

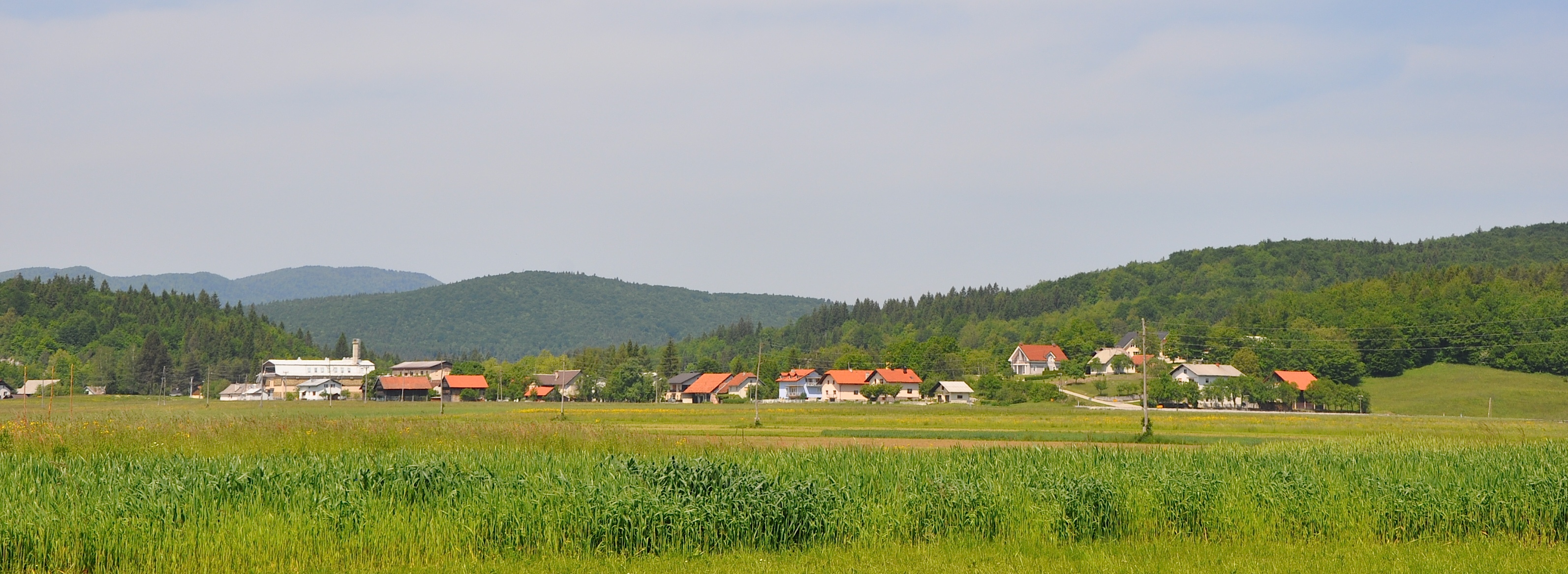

- Location in Slovenia
- Coordinates: 45°51′28.88″N 14°40′55.33″E
- Country: Slovenia
- Traditional region: Lower Carniola
- Statistical region: Central Slovenia
- Municipality: Dobrepolje

Area
  - Total: 3.64 km^{2} (1.41 sq mi)
- Elevation: 449.1 m (1,473 ft)

Population (2020)
  - Total: 291
  - Density: 79.9/km^{2} (207/sq mi)

Predstruge (pronounced [pɾɛtˈstɾuːɡɛ]) is a village northwest of Videm in the Municipality of Dobrepolje in Slovenia. The area is part of the historical region of Lower Carniola and is now included in the Central Slovenia Statistical Region.

== Transport ==
Predstruge is located on the railway line to Ljubljana, and its station serves the municipal seat of Videm 1.6 kilometres (0.99 mi) away.
