= Štefan Primožič =

Slovene educator (1866–1907)

- Born: November 17, 1866; Bistra, Austria-Hungary
- Died: December 8, 1907 (aged 41); Kandija, Austria-Hungary
- Occupation: Educator

Štefan Primožič (November 17, 1866 – December 8, 1907) was a Slovenian teacher. He was the first head of the Ljubljana Institute for the Deaf.

== Life and work ==
Primožič was born in Bistra, then part of Austria-Hungary. After a few years of high school, Primožič transferred to the Ljubljana normal school and graduated in 1887. After a few months of work at the Ljubljana normal school, he was temporarily transferred to Dobrova near Ljubljana. He passed the professional exam in 1889, and that fall he was transferred to Postojna, where he received a permanent position in 1890. From the fall of 1899 to the fall of 1905, he was excused from work in Postojna. During this time, he trained for one year to teach and educate the deaf at the Austrian school for the deaf in Vienna (German: Taubstummeninstitut). He passed the professional exam with honors and then visited schools for the deaf in Lower and Upper Austria, Moravia, Bohemia, Carinthia, and Styria, and in the fall of 1900 at the Ljubljana State Teacher Training College he assumed management of the new Carniola Institute for the Deaf and Blind (Slovene: Zavod za gluhoneme in slepe otroke na Kranjskem, German: Taubstummen- und Blinden-Anstalt in Krain). He drew up the institution's statute and provisional house rules. After five years, at his own request, he was released from his job in the school for the deaf and returned to public education as the principal of the school in Dobrepolje in the fall of 1905. After two years of working in Dobrepolje, he died of pneumonia in a hospital in Kandija.

During his service in Postojna and Ljubljana, Primožič compiled 11 volumes of the journal Ročni zapisnik za slovensko učiteljstvo (Manual Minutes for Slovenian Teachers; Postojna 1894–1904).
