= Johann Nepomuk Fuchs (architect) =

Silesian architect (1727–1804)

Johann Nepomuk Fuchs (Slovenized: Janez Nepomuk Fuchs) (1727 – 7 May 1804) was a Lower Styrian church architect and, alongside Josef Hueber (1715/17–1787), was the main representative of the "Styrian Baroque" in the third quarter of the 18th century.

== Life ==
Johann Nepomuk Fuchs was born in Neiss, Silesia. The papers from his estate indicate that he survived the 1755 Lisbon earthquake while he was traveling for study. Fuchs arrived in Maribor in the 1750s as an employee of the architect Josef Hoffer (1700–1764). After Hoffer's death, Fuchs married his widow Barbara in 1762, took over Hoffer's prominent workshop, and soon became prosperous. Fuchs was accepted into the architect's guild in 1762, became a citizen of Maribor in 1763, and became the head of the guild in 1764. Fuchs is known for his oval architectural designs executed in Maribor and Pregrada. His architectural style is essentially late Baroque, although Classicist influences can be seen in his later works. Fuchs died in Maribor on 7 May 1804.

== Works (including attributed) ==
- Saint Giles' Parish Church (German: Hl. Ägydius) in Hollenegg (1750)
- Church tower in Gleinstätten (1751)
- Parish church in Ehrenhausen (1751–54)
- Church in Sankt Johann im Saggautal (1750–58)
- Assumption Pilgrimage Church at Frauenberg (German: Mariä Himmelfsahrt am Frauenberg) at Leibnitz (1760), dome of the church and apse
- Sacristy of St. Joseph's Church in Maribor (1764)
- Church in Kostrivnica (1766–1768)
- St. Alois' Church and main square in Maribor (1767–1769/70)
- Assumption Church Vurberk (1773)
- Baroque church in Selnica ob Dravi (1773)
- St. Nicholaus' Church in Vurberk (designed 1772, built 1773–1776)
- Church and rectory in Wies (1774–1782, rectory probably in 1798, when the church in Wies was elevated to a parish church)
- Holy Spirit Hospital Church in Krško (1770–1777)
- Saint Patrick's Church in Hollenegg (1777)
- Saint James' Church in Nestelbach bei Graz (1779)
- St. George's rectory in Celje (1780)
- St. Lawrence's Church in Brežice (1781–1782)
- Our Lady of the Snows Church and rectory in Zgornja Velka (1789–1791)
- Assumption Parish Church in Pregrada (designed 1790, built 1803 to 1818)

=== Uncertain dates ===
- Renovation of Zajezda Manor (in the 1770s or 1780s), one of his few non-religious commissions, perhaps secured through Archbishop Adam Patachich.
- St. Ladislaus' Parish Church in Pokupsko

== Reading ==
- Đurđica Cvitanović. 1995. "Johann Fuchs projektant župne crkve u Pregradi." In: Peristil. Zbornik radova za povijest umjetnosti. ISSN 0553-6707, vol. 38, Zagreb, pp. 121–128. (reissued as offprint, Zagreb 1997)
- Metoda Kemperl. 2005. "Jožef Hoffer – Arhitekt brez meja." In: Podravina. ISSN 1333-5286, vol. 7.
- Metoda Kemperl. 2007. Korpus poznobaročne sakralne arhitekture na slovenskem Štajerskem, Ljubljana 2007. (Historia Artis series - electronic editions], ISBN 978-961-237-207-1
