= Krško =

Krško Videm–Krško (1953–1964)
- Town
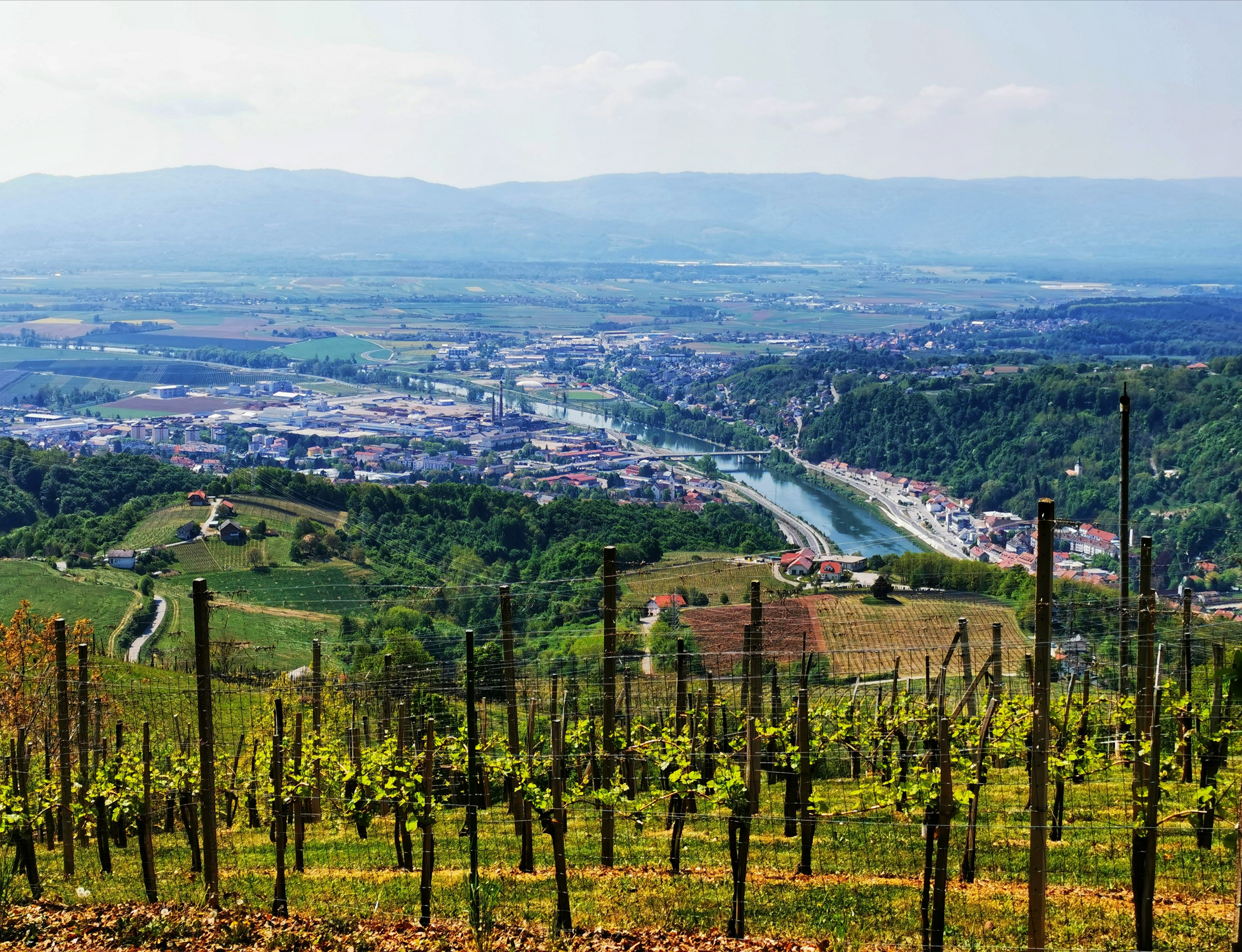
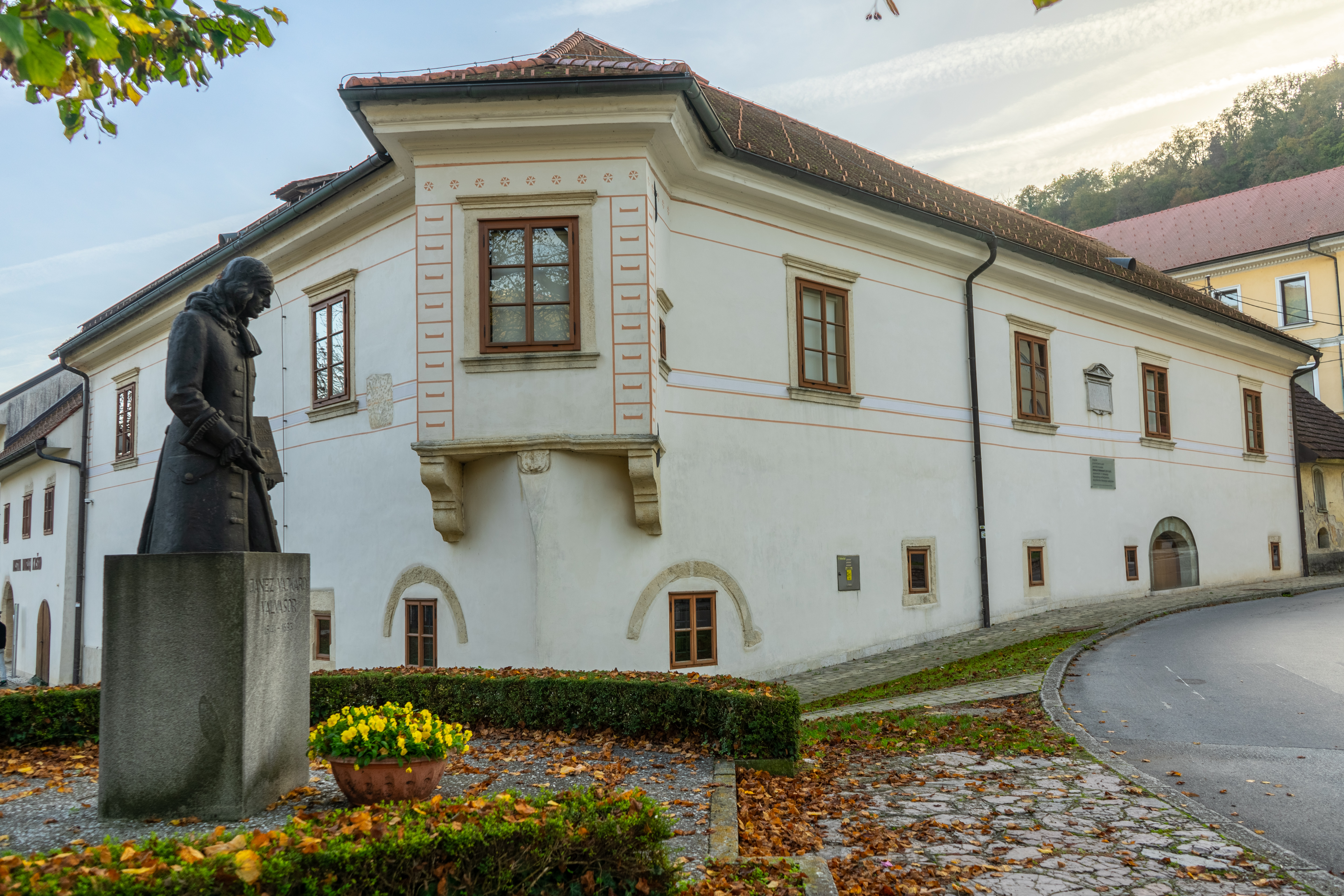
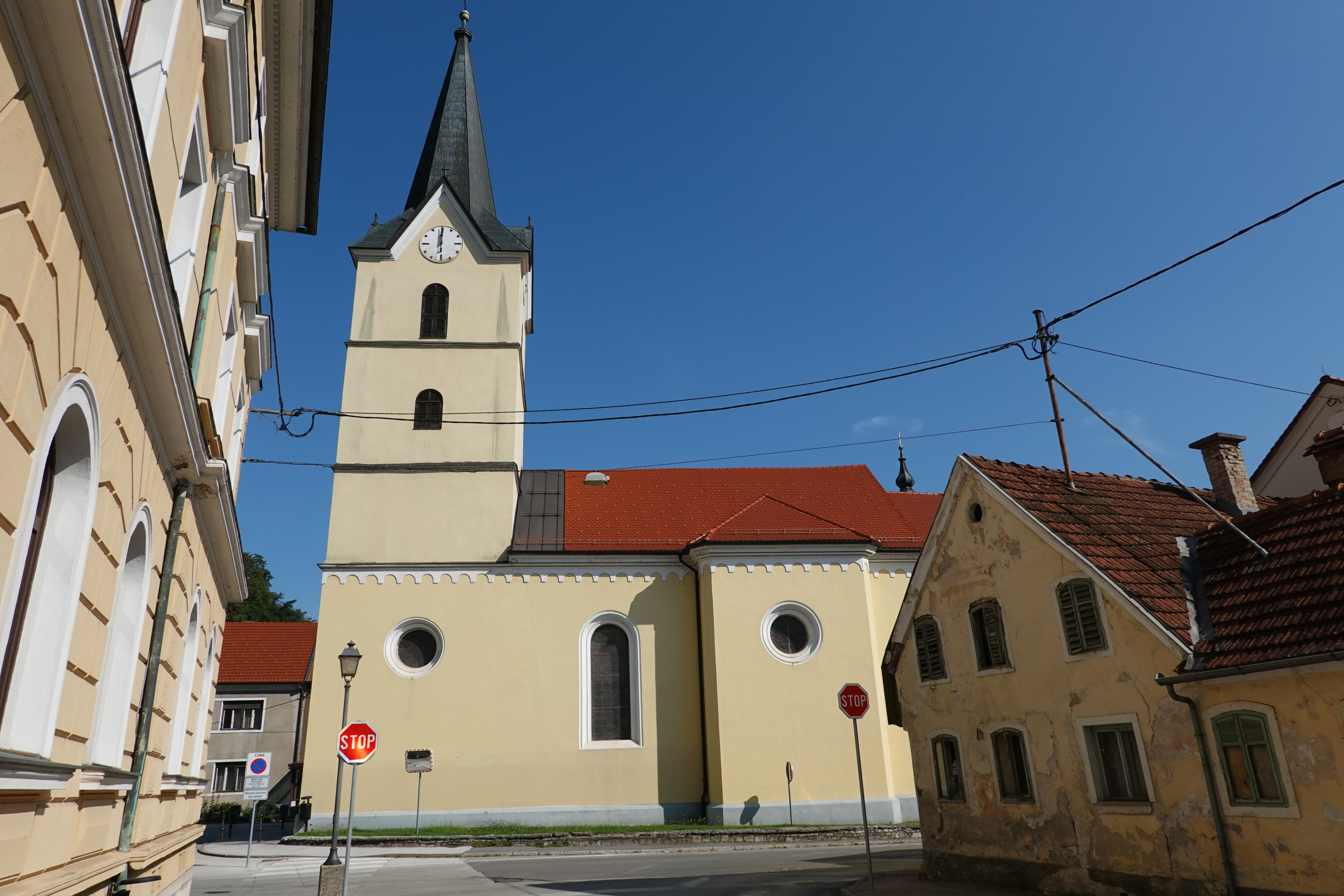
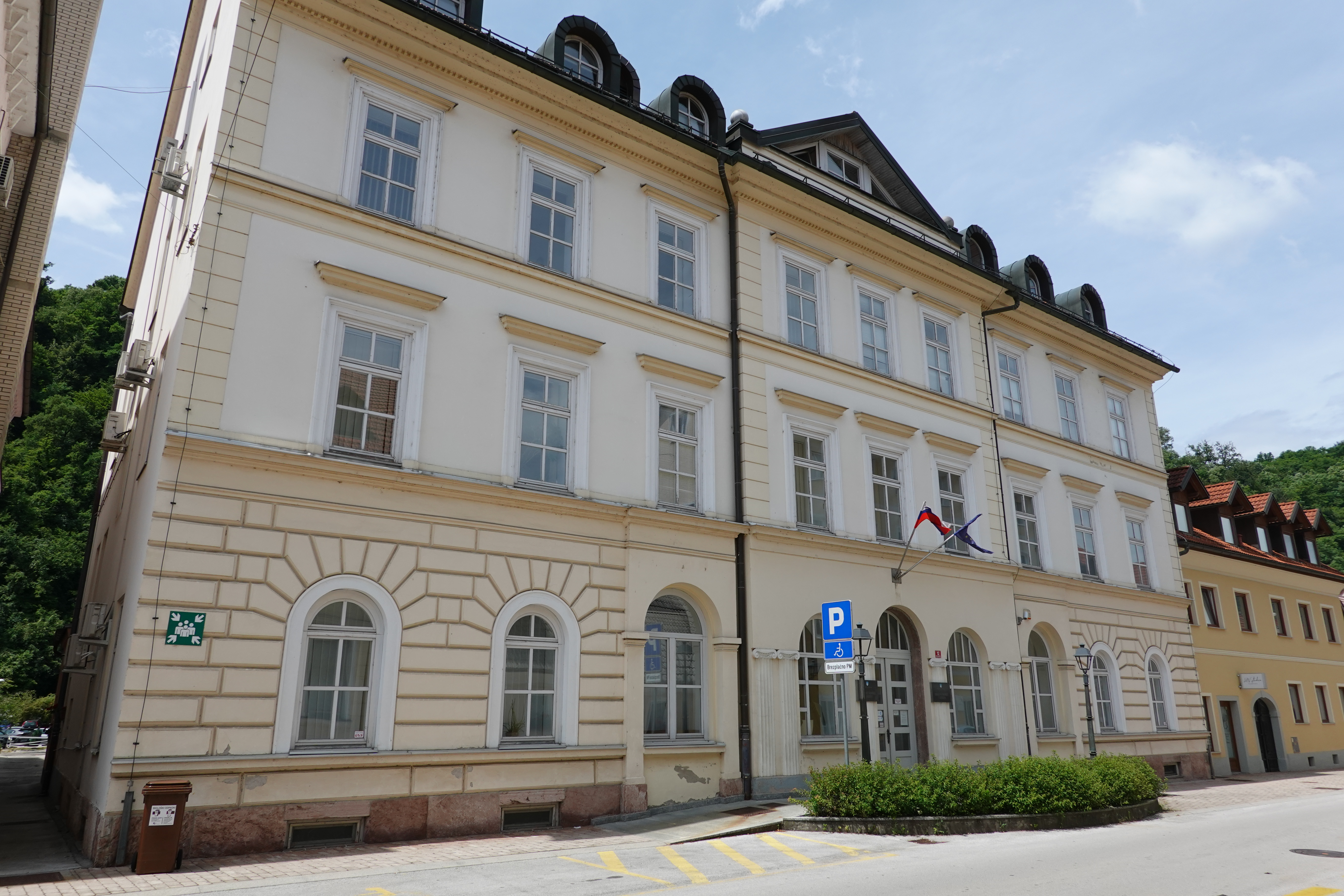
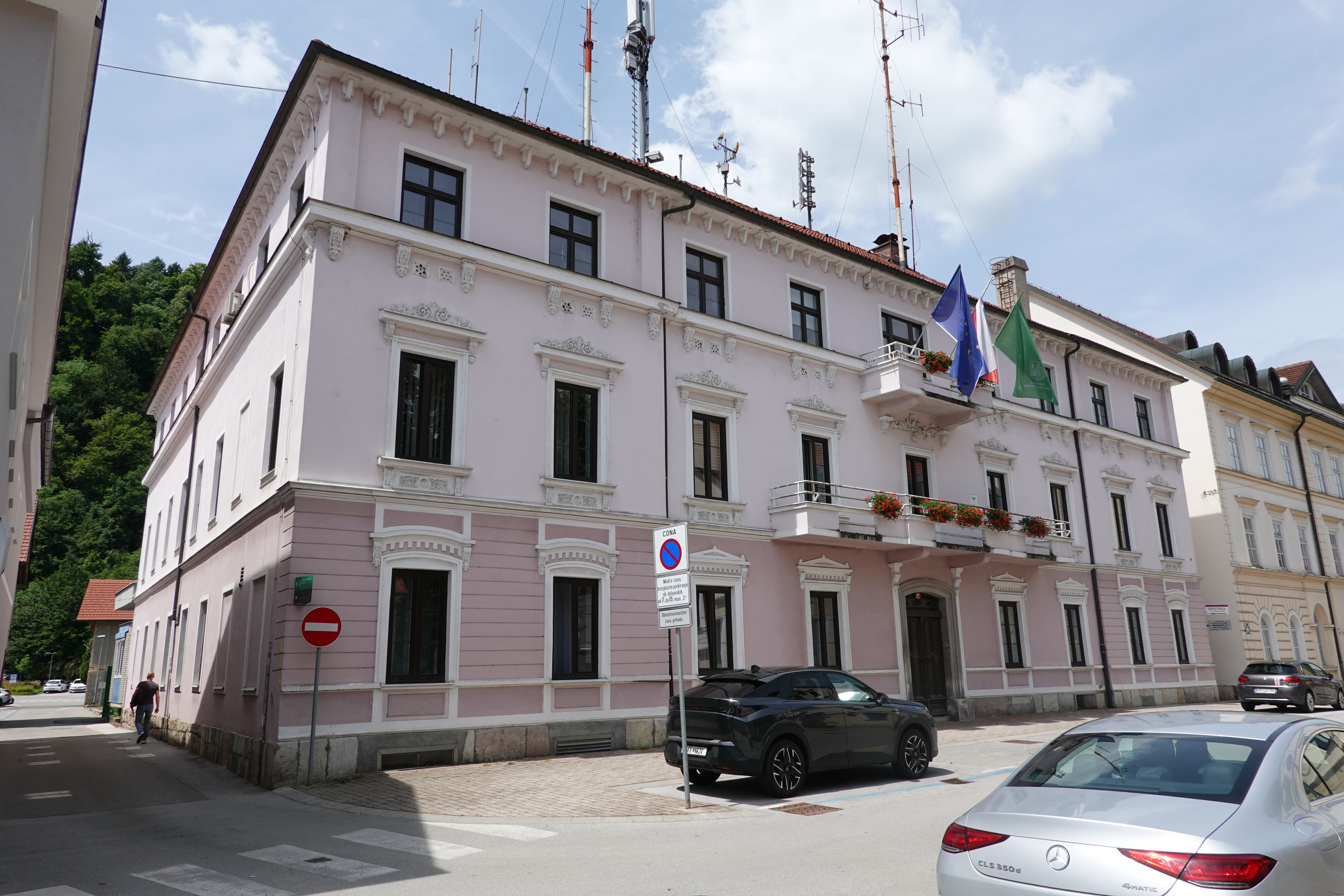
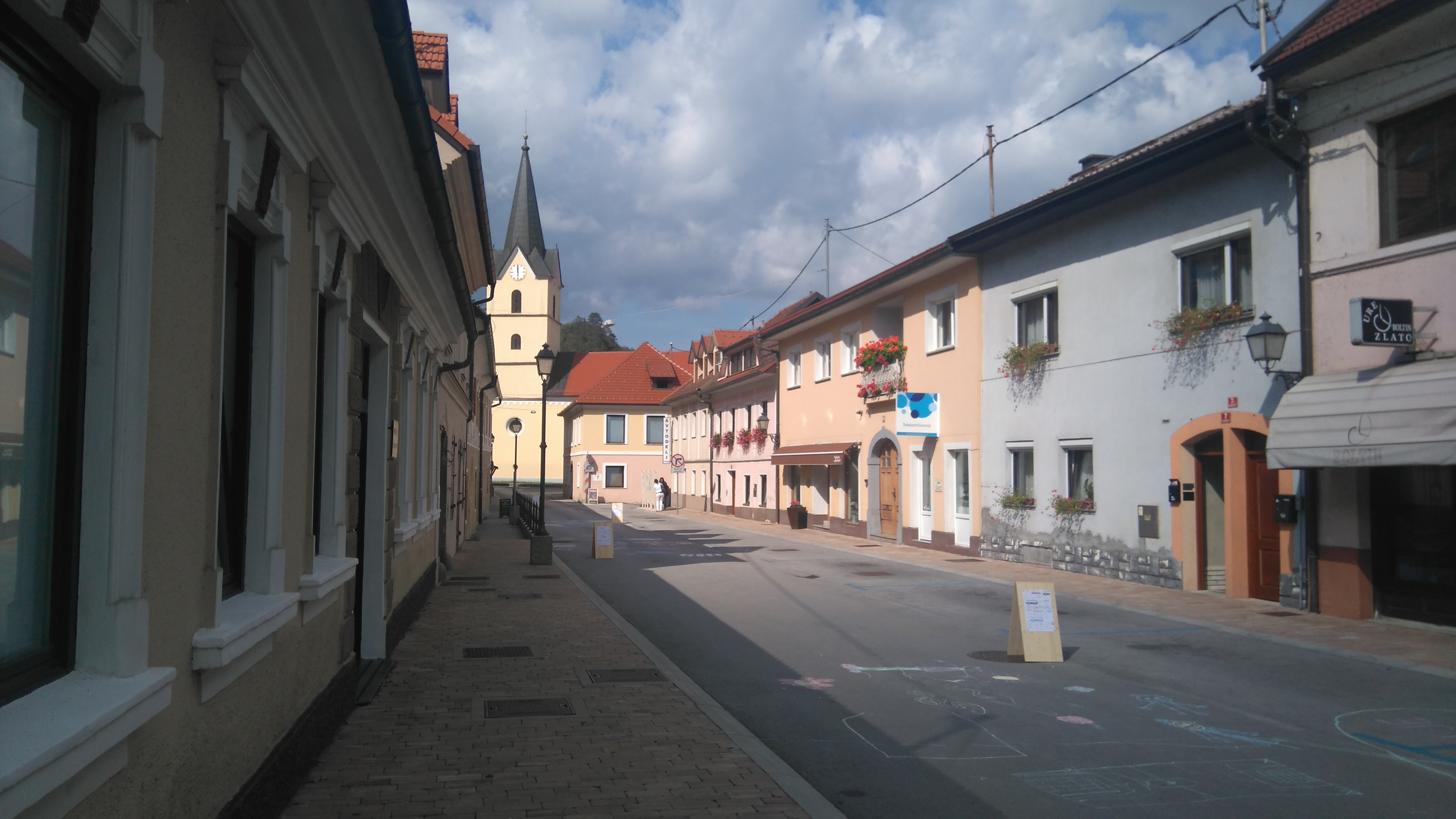
- From top, left to right: View over Krško, Museum, St. John's Church, Courthouse, Town Hall, Old Town street

- Coat of arms

- Location of the Town of Krško in Slovenia
- Coordinates: 45°57′N 15°29′E
- Country: Slovenia
- Traditional region: Lower Carniola and Styria
- Statistical region: Lower Sava
- Municipality: Krško

Area
  - Total: 6.00 km^{2} (2.32 sq mi)
- Elevation: 163 m (535 ft)

Population (2023)
  - Total: 6,852
  - Density: 1,140/km^{2} (2,960/sq mi)
- Time zone: UTC+01 (CET)
  - Summer (DST): UTC+02 (CEST)
- Postal code: 8270
- Vehicle registration: KK
- Website: www.krsko.si

Historical population
| Year | Pop. | ±% |
|---|---|---|
| 1948 | 2,314 | — |
| 1953 | 2,777 | +20.0% |
| 1961 | 3,669 | +32.1% |
| 1971 | 4,371 | +19.1% |
| 1981 | 7,037 | +61.0% |
| 1991 | 7,191 | +2.2% |
| 2002 | 6,994 | −2.7% |
| 2011 | 7,097 | +1.5% |
| 2021 | 6,778 | −4.5% |
Population size may be affected by changes in administrative divisions.

Krško (pronounced [ˈkə́ɾʃkɔ]; German: Gurkfeld) is a town in eastern Slovenia. It is the seat of the City Municipality of Krško. The town lies on the Sava River and on the northwest edge of the Krško Plain (Slovene: Krško polje), which is part of the larger Krka Flat (Slovene: Krška ravan). The area is divided between the traditional regions of Styria (territory on the left bank of the Sava) and Lower Carniola (territory on the right bank of the Sava). The entire municipality is now included in the Lower Sava Statistical Region.

Slovenia's only nuclear power plant, the Krško Nuclear Power Plant, lies southeast of the town.

== Name ==
The name of the settlement was changed from Krško to Videm–Krško in 1953. The name Krško was restored in 1964. In the past the German name was Gurkfeld.

== History ==
Archaeological evidence shows that the area was settled in prehistoric times. Along the Sava River, numerous Bronze and Iron Age sites as well as Roman finds show continuous occupation. After the Medieval period the area was a Habsburg possession. It was affected by Ottoman raids from the 15th to 17th centuries.

=== Mass grave ===
Krško is the site of a mass grave associated with the Second World War. The Bunker Mass Grave (Slovene: Grobišče v zaklonišču) is located on the steep right bank of the Sava River, opposite the municipal headquarters, 50 meters (160 ft) north of the house at Bohoričeva 4, and 100 meters (330 ft) south of a school playground. According to statements from the Krško police, it is believed that more than 100 civilians, mostly Croatians, were murdered in an abandoned bunker and the bunker was then dynamited. The location has been precisely defined, and investigation of the site is needed.

== Main sights ==
The Krško parish church in the town centre is dedicated to John the Evangelist and belongs to the Roman Catholic Diocese of Novo Mesto. Originally a late 15th-century building, it was largely rebuilt in 1899. A second parish is the Parish of Videm-Krško in the southern part of the town. Its parish church is dedicated to Saint Rupert. It was built from 1893 to 1897 in the Neo-Romanesque style. The church in the hamlet of Stara Vas (German: Altendorf), dedicated to Saint Michael, belongs to this parish. It was built in 1768 to replace an older structure. The church on the right bank of the Sava is dedicated to the Holy Spirit and was built in 1777 according to plans by the Austrian architect Johann Nepomuk Fuchs.

The Capuchin monastery with its church is in the centre of town on the right bank of the Sava. It was built from 1640 to 1644 and was altered at various stages in its history.

== Prominent residents ==
South of Holy Spirit Church is a town house built in 1607 in which the 17th-century scholar Johann Weikhard von Valvasor lived the final years of his life. He died there in 1693. Other important figures in Slovene history linked with Krško are Adam Bohorič, a grammarian and early schoolmaster, born in Brestanica in 1520, his pupil Jurij Dalmatin, born in Krško around 1547 who, by 1578, had translated the entire Bible into Slovene (published in 1583) and Leopoldina Bavdek - Poldka (1881–1965), Slovenian teacher, folklorist, and ethnologist.

- Robert Berič, footballer
- Benjamin Šeško, footballer, played for NK Krško in younger categories

== Economy ==
Industries of Krško include construction, metalworking, paper, textiles, wood processing, agriculture, trade, and transportation, while tourism continues to develop.

== See also ==
- Speedway Grand Prix of Slovenia
- Brežice
