= Vinica, Črnomelj =

Vinica
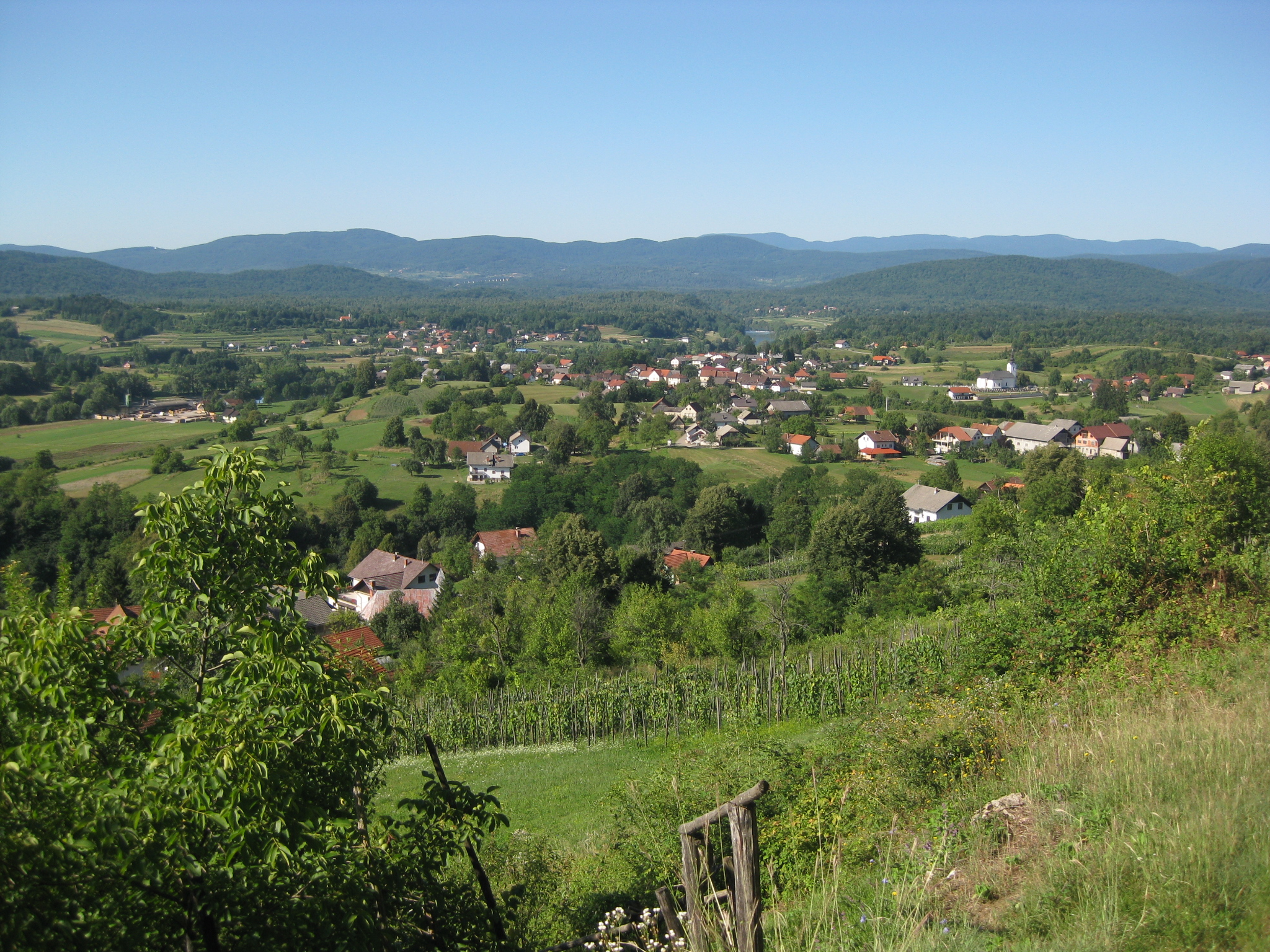

- Location in Slovenia
- Coordinates: 45°27′40.86″N 15°15′12.77″E
- Country: Slovenia
- Traditional region: White Carniola
- Statistical region: Southeast Slovenia
- Municipality: Črnomelj

Area
  - Total: 0.38 km^{2} (0.15 sq mi)
- Elevation: 184.4 m (605 ft)

Population (2020)
  - Total: 249
  - Density: 660/km^{2} (1,700/sq mi)
- Postal code: 8344

Vinica (pronounced [ˈʋiːnitsa]; German: Weinitz, Gottscheerish: Bainits) is a village on the left bank of the Kolpa River in the Municipality of Črnomelj in the White Carniola area of southeastern Slovenia, right on the border with Croatia. The area is part of the traditional region of Lower Carniola and is now included in the Southeast Slovenia Statistical Region.

The local parish church is dedicated to the Holy Cross (Slovene: sveti Križ) and belongs to the Roman Catholic Diocese of Novo Mesto. It was built in the early 16th century, but owes its current Baroque look to a major remodelling in the first half of the 18th century.

Vinica was the birthplace of the Slovene poet, translator, and playwright Oton Župančič. The house in which he was born in 1878 burned down in a fire in 1888, but in 1951 a small museum to the poet was set up in the building that replaced it. In recent years the museum has been enlarged. The upper floor of the museum is dedicated to important people from White Carniola.

== Prominent residents ==
- Leopoldina Bavdek (1881–1965), Slovenian teacher, folklorist, and ethnologist
