= Bistra, Vrhnika =

Bistra
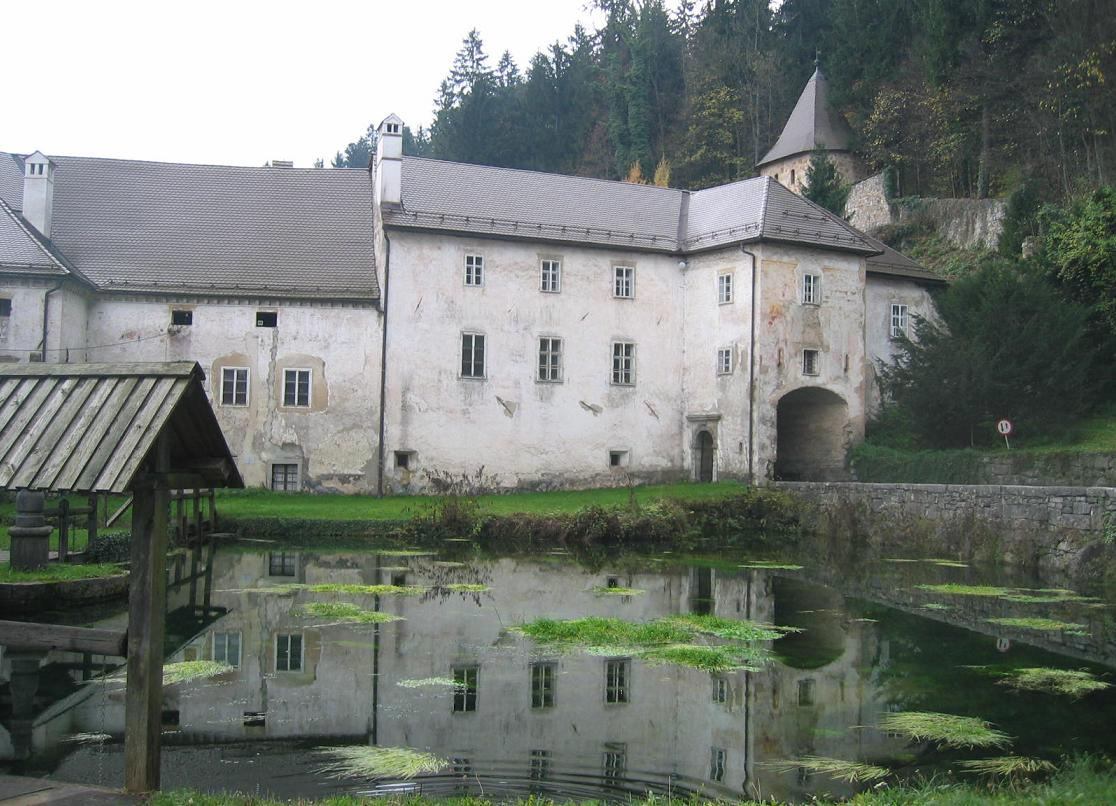
- Bistra monastery

- Location in Slovenia
- Coordinates: 45°56′49.35″N 14°19′56.99″E
- Country: Slovenia
- Traditional region: Inner Carniola
- Statistical region: Central Slovenia
- Municipality: Vrhnika

Area
  - Total: 4.17 km^{2} (1.61 sq mi)
- Elevation: 291.2 m (955 ft)

Population (2002)
  - Total: 44

Bistra (pronounced [ˈbiːstɾa]; German: Freudenthal) is a small settlement in the Municipality of Vrhnika in the Inner Carniola region of Slovenia.

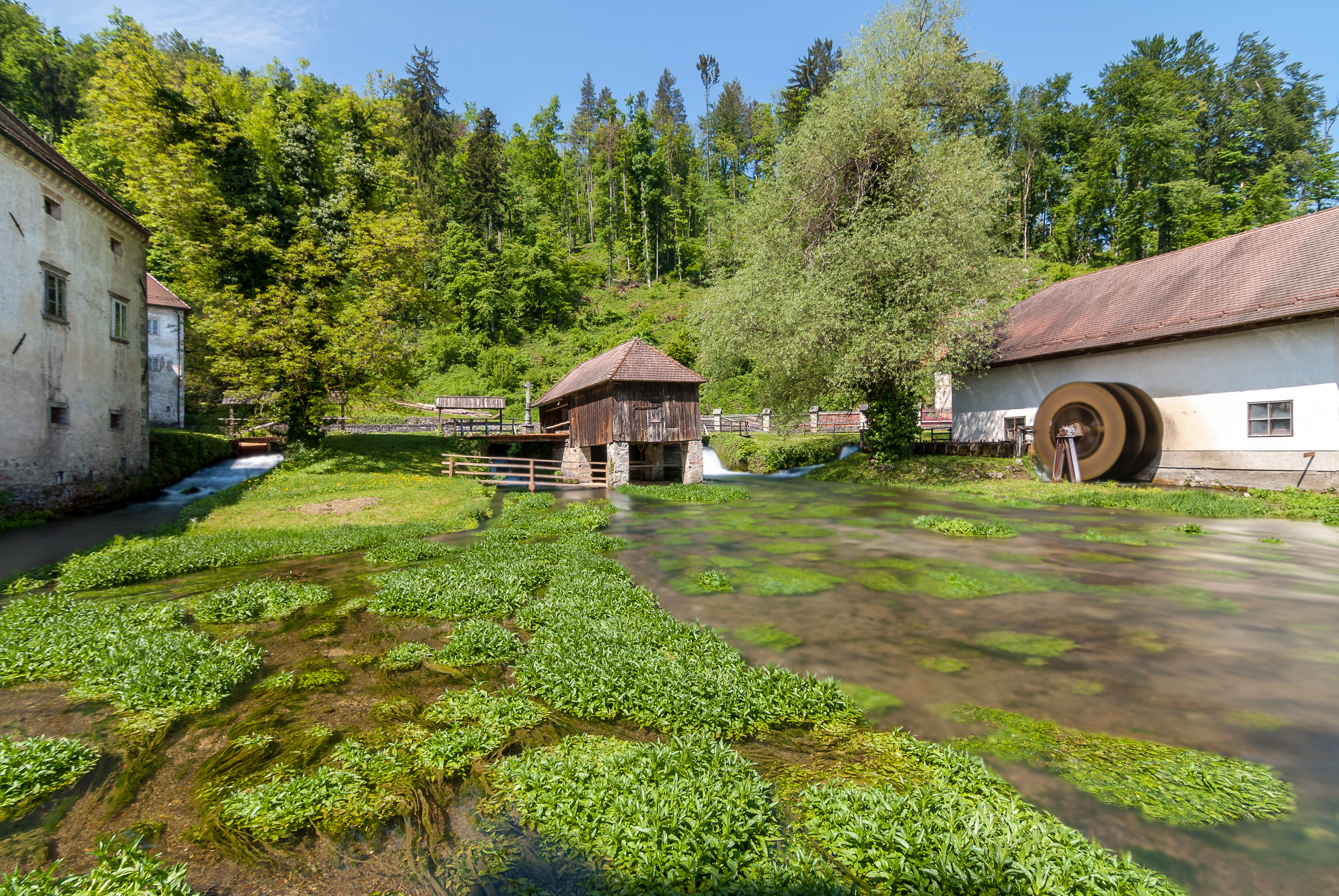
Karst source of the Bistra River, a source tributary of the Ljubljanica, at Bistra

== Name ==
Bistra was attested in written sources as Frovnc in 1257, Vallis iocose in 1306, Freydenthall in 1350, Vistra in 1470, and Bistrae in 1481, among other spellings. Bistra and names like it (e.g., Bistrica), as well as the German adaptation of the name as Feistritz, are common in Slovene ethnic territory. Such names were originally hydronyms that were later applied to the settlements along rivers or streams with these names. The names are derived from Slavic *bystrica 'swiftly flowing river', from the Slavic adjective *bystrъ 'swiftly flowing, rushing'. Bistra is named after the Bistra River, a right tributary of the Ljubljanica. The settlement was known as Freudenthal in German.

== Bistra Charterhouse ==
It is best known for Bistra Charterhouse (monastery) (also called "Bistra Castle"), a large complex that from 1260 housed the first monastery in Carniola. It was disbanded in 1782 upon a decree by the Emperor Joseph II. Since 1951, it houses the Technical Museum of Slovenia. The museum's collections comprise items related to forestry, carpentry, fishing, electricity, and transport, including a large collection of Tito's cars and several others that were used in the filming of Schindler's List.

== Notable people ==
Notable people that were born or lived in Bistra include:

- Bruno, 18th-century painter
- John Jager (1871–1959), designer and architect
- Nicholas, 14th-century manuscript illuminator
- Štefan Primožič (1866–1907), educator
