= Dobrepolje railway station =

Railway station in Slovenia

Dobrepolje
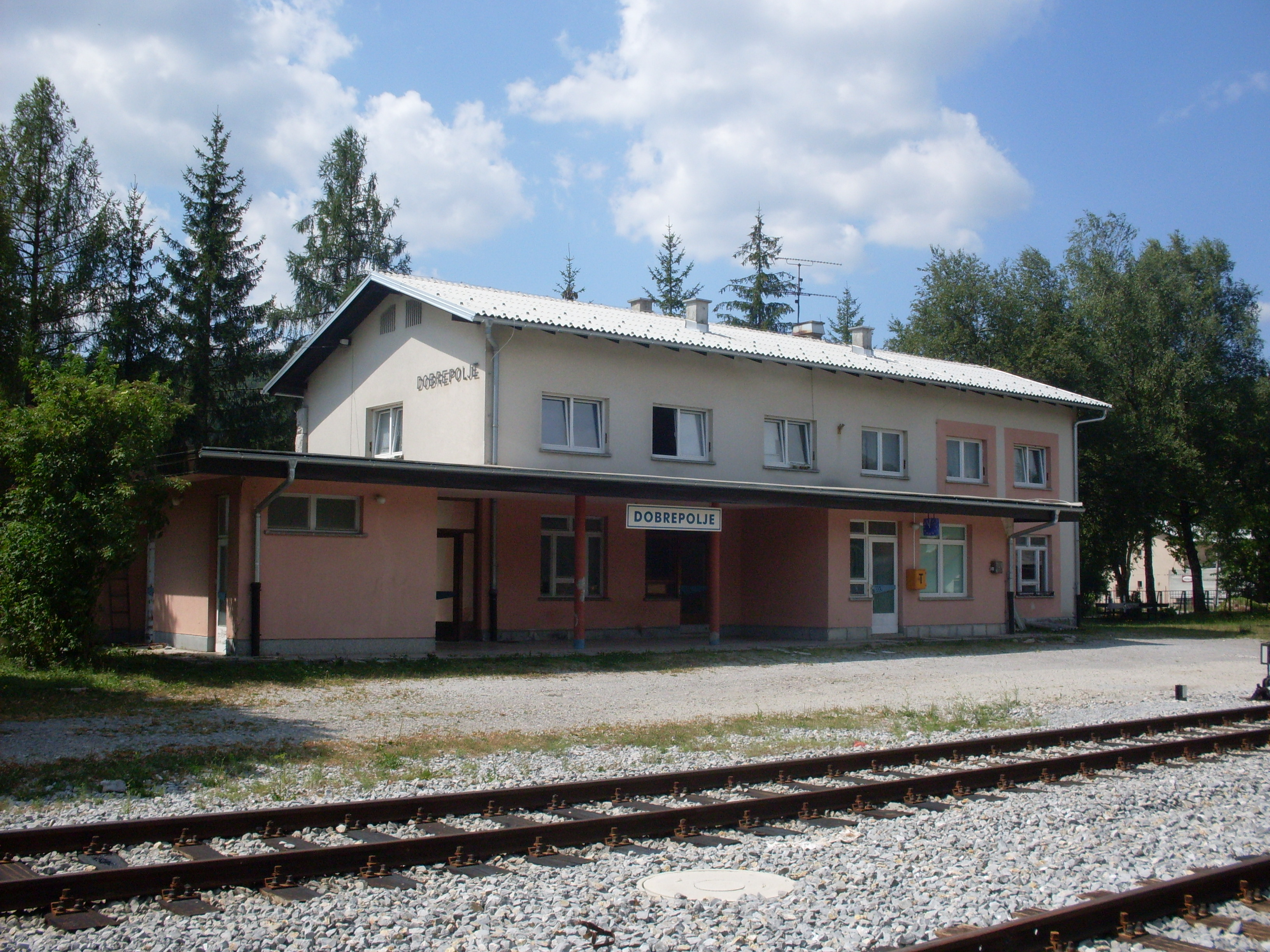

General information
- Location: 1312 Videm - Dobrepolje; Slovenia
- Coordinates: 45°51′30″N 14°40′53″E
- Owner: Slovenian Railways
- Operator: Slovenian Railways
Location
- Location within Slovenia

Dobrepolje railway station (Slovene: Železniška postaja Dobrepolje) is the principal railway station in Predstruge, Slovenia.
