= Grad (toponymy) =

Place name element meaning 'town'

Grad (Cyrillic: град) is an Old Slavic word meaning "town", "city", "castle" or "fortified settlement". Initially present in all related languages as gord, it can still be found as grad, gradić, horod or gorod in many placenames today.

These places have grad as part of their name:

- Asenovgrad ("Asen's town")
- Beograd ("white town"), capital of Serbia, known in English as Belgrade. The largest city with grad in its name (in the 21st century).
- Biograd ("white town")
- Blagoevgrad ("Blagoev's town")
- Csongrád (Serbian: Čongrad), Hungary ("black castle/town")
- Bosilegrad
- Danilovgrad ("Danilo's town")
- Dimitrovgrad ("Dimitrov's town")
- Donji Grad ("lower town")
- Dravograd ("Drava town")
- Filmski Grad ("film town")
- Golem Grad
- Gornji Grad ("upper town")
- Grad, Slovenia
- Gradac ("small town")
- Gradec ("small town/castle")
- Gradina ("large town/castle")
- Gradinje
- Gradisca d'Isonzo (Italian fortress city)
- Gradišče ("town-place/castle-place")
- Gradsko ("of the town")
- Karditsa, Greece (“little town”)
- Gródek ("small town/castle")
- Grodzisk ("town-place/castle-place")
- Grodzisko ("town-place/castle-place")
- Grodziszcze ("town-place/castle-place")
- Ivaylovgrad ("Ivaylo's town")
- Kaliningrad ("Kalinin's town")
- Kirovgrad ("Kirov's town")
- Leningrad ("Lenin's town")
- Moigrad ("my city")
- Mrkonjić Grad ("Mrkonjić's town")
- Novgorod ("new town")
- Novi Grad ("new town")
- Novigrad ("new town")
- Nowogród ("new town")
- Nowogród, Poland ("new town")
- Nowy Gródek ("new small town")
- Petrograd ("Peter's town")
- Petrovgrad ("Peter's town")
- Podgrad ("below the town/castle")
- Pogradec ("below the small town")
- Razgrad ("Hors' town")
- Stalingrad ("Stalin's town")
- Stari Grad ("old town")
- Starigrad ("old town")
- Țarigrad ("king's town")
- Tarnovgrad ("thorny city")
- Titograd ("Tito's town"), the former name for Podgorica, the capital of Montenegro
- Tomislavgrad ("Tomislav's town")
- Topolovgrad ("poplar town")
- Tsargrad ("imperial city"), a Slavic name for Constantinople (present-day Istanbul).
- Velehrad
- Veliko Gradište ("large town-place")
- Velingrad ("Vela's town")
- Vinograd
- Vinogradovca
- Visegrad ("upper town")
- Volgograd ("Volga town")
- Voroshilovgrad ("Voroshilov's town"), in honour of Soviet military commander Kliment Voroshilov.
- Yekaterinograd ("Catherine's town")
- Zlatograd ("gold town")
