= City status in Ukraine =

Status of certain populated places in Ukraine

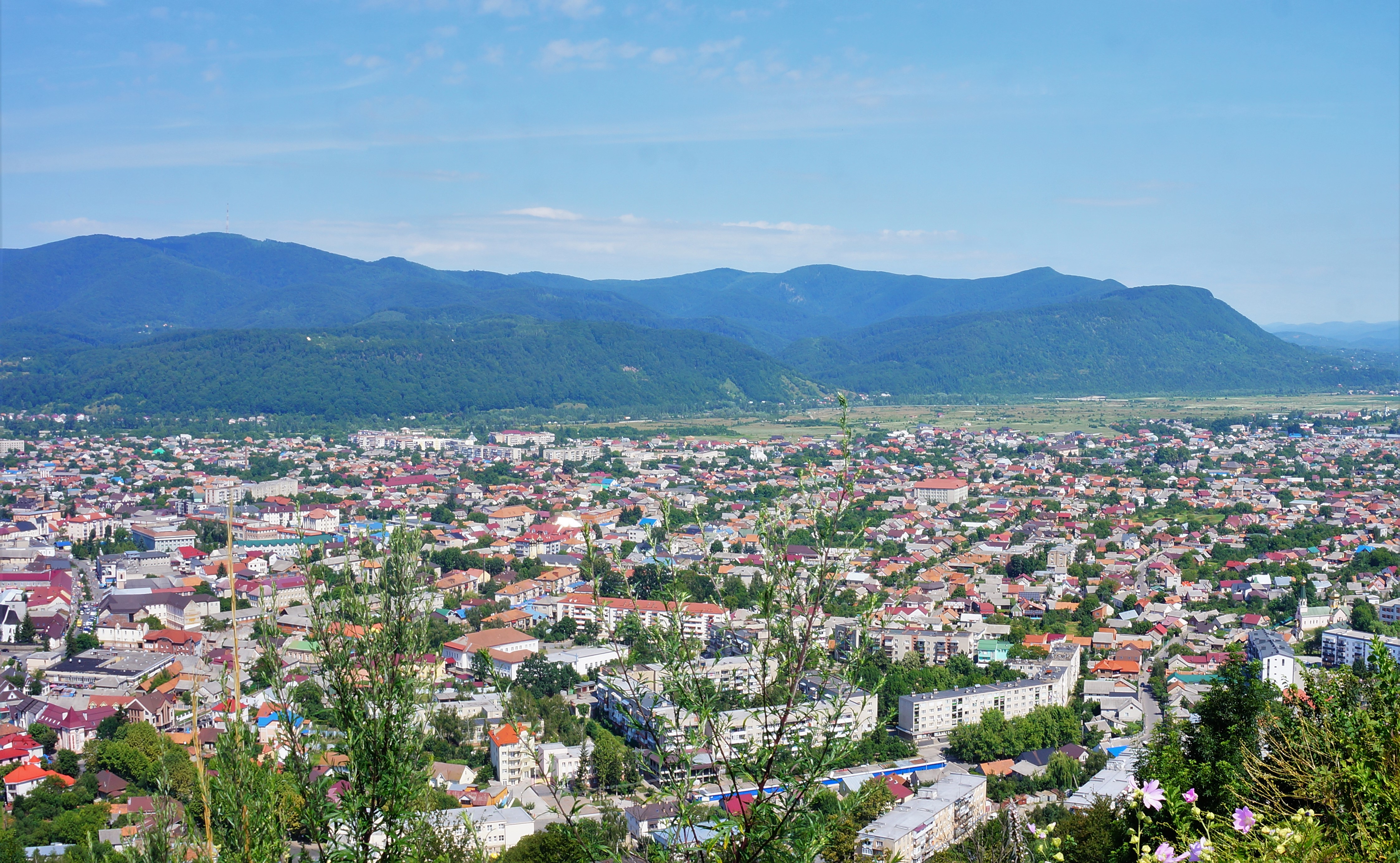
Khust, one of the first Ukrainian cities to receive Magdeburg rights

City status is granted by the Verkhovna Rada (the national parliament of Ukraine) to certain populated places. It is not automatically given according to any particular criteria, although since 2024, settlements with more than 10,000 people and a high population density have been eligible for city status under a specific law. In addition, the status is typically granted to settlements of historical or regional importance, even if they do not meet the population threshold.

The status was not strictly defined until the late Middle Ages, when Magdeburg rights spread throughout Europe, giving several settlements legally protected privileges. Under the Polish–Lithuanian Commonwealth in the 16th century, a system of cities and towns developed, with some cities recognized as royal and given special rights. During this time period, as well as under the Austrian and Russian empires from the 18th to the 20th centuries, city status was granted by kings and emperors. The Soviet Union was the first to establish a clearly defined system, categorizing cities by population and importance, and giving the government of Soviet Ukraine the authority to assign or change the status. Since Ukraine's independence in 1991, a similar system has been used, although the categorization of cities into those of regional and district significance was abolished in 2020.

Legally, cities do not differ significantly from other populated places (rural settlements and villages), although city status is often seen as prestigious, helping to mobilize resources and attract investors and tourists. A city may host the administration of a hromada (municipality), in which case the hromada is classified as urban and its government is called a city council. A local council is in charge of municipal services, local development, and other local functions, and its administration is overseen by an executive committee headed by an elected mayor. Cities may also be divided into subdivisions called urban districts, a system currently used in 24 cities. Cities with fewer than 50,000 inhabitants are classified as small and fall under a national program for their development.

As of July 2026, there are 463 cities in Ukraine. The largest city is Kyiv, the country's capital, with a population of over 2.9 million, while the smallest inhabited city is Uhniv, with an estimated 939 residents as of 2022. Two cities – Chernobyl and Pripyat – are abandoned as a result of the 1986 Chernobyl disaster, but have not lost their city status. Kyiv and Sevastopol are also recognized as cities with special status, meaning that they function as first-level administrative divisions independent from oblasts (regions) or autonomous republics. Olyka most recently received city status, in April 2025.

== History ==
=== Pre-20th century ===
The Black Sea coast was colonized by the Greeks since the 8th century BC. Many of the colonies later came under Roman control, including Chersonesus, which was granted eleutheria – the status of a free city with the right to self-government and to manage its own land and laws – by the emperor in the first century. In contrast, Tyras was granted autonomy, which likewise provided some rights, albeit limited and exercised under the supervision of a provincial governor.

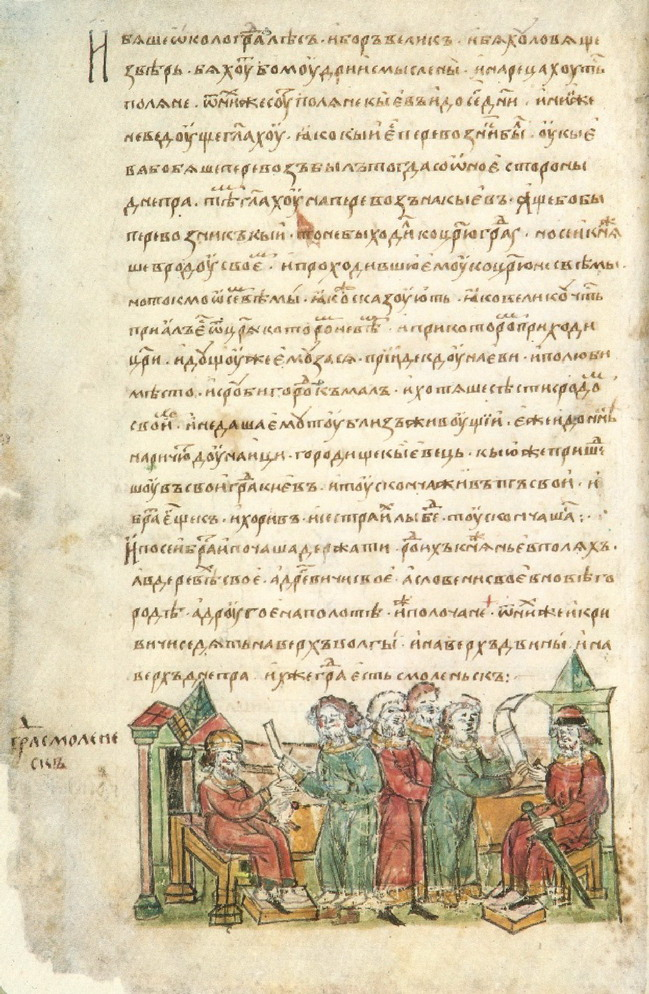
A page of the Radziwiłł Chronicle, with "grad of Kiev" (град Києвъ) mentioned on line 15

During the Middle Ages under the Kievan Rus', the terms grad and gorod were used to refer to fortified settlements. The exact difference between the two is unclear: while historian Pyotr Tretyakov theorized that grads were fortified estates inhabited by the nobility, some of which evolved into trading centers called gorods, later historian Petro Tolochko concluded that neither term may have carried any social meaning. From the 9th to the early 12th century, about a hundred grads were mentioned in the Rus' chronicles, although the majority of Rus' settlements were rural and often unfortified, and called ves, selo, pogost, or sloboda. Some grads also served as capitals of principalities, with the major ones located on the territory of modern Ukraine being Kiev, Chernigov, Pereyaslavl, Galich, and Volodimer.

The system of Magdeburg rights developed in Europe since the 14th century, granting selected settlements special privileges, including self-government, tax and judicial immunity, the right to own land, trade benefits, and exemption from most feudal duties; however, these rights largely applied to Roman Catholic men. They eventually replaced an existing system of customary law that had been in place prior to the Mongol invasion of Kievan Rus', although the two often coexisted in individual cities. The Kingdom of Hungary was the first to grant Magdeburg rights to cities located in modern-day Ukraine, the first being Khust, Tiachiv, and Vyshkovo in 1329. Yuri II Boleslav, the king of Galicia–Volhynia, granted these rights to Sanok in 1339, which brings about the possibility that other major cities of the kingdom, such as Lviv and Volodymyr, could have also received the same rights in that period. After the kingdom was conquered by Poland and Lithuania, the system was implemented widely in the area. Kings granted Magdeburg rights to large cities such as Lwów (1356) and Kiew (1494). Magdeburg rights were also sometimes granted by princely houses, for example, to Lokhvytsia, Lubny, Pryluky, and Pyriatyn by the Wiśniowiecki family. Under the Polish–Lithuanian Commonwealth, a system of cities (Polish: miasta) and towns (miasteczka) was first established, with the former status given to settlements of great importance, receiving particular rights, and the latter to settlements privately owned by the nobility that had the permission to organize markets and fairs. Some cities were categorized as private, belonging to noble families or the church. After the issue of the Free Royal Cities Act in 1791, a special category called royal cities was established, granting select cities special privileges including representation in the Sejm, the right to own landed property, security guarantees, and a possibility of ennoblement. After the Cossack Hetmanate was established as the result of the Khmelnytsky Uprising, numerous towns and cities served as regiment centers, transforming them into important administrative, judicial, economic, and military hubs. Cities and towns were then classified either as magisterial (those holding Magdeburg rights) or as ratusha towns, which were each headed by a chieftain known as horodovyi otaman and were subject to the jurisdiction of the general Cossack authorities.

The last wave of the granting of Magdeburg rights occurred when the rights were granted by the hetmans of the Hetmanate after its union with the Russian Empire, among the last being Poltava and Novhorod-Siverskyi by Kyrylo Rozumovsky. A system of cities (Russian: города, romanized: goroda) and towns (местечка, mestechka) continued to exist under Russia after the liquidation of the Hetmanate. From the early 18th century, city status was given directly by the emperor. The 1785 Charter for the Rights and Benefits of the Cities of the Russian Empire issued by Catherine II defined the legal rights of city inhabitants and granted cities self-governance, establishing institutions such as city dumas, and the permission to organize markets and fairs. A city was also given a coat of arms and a city plan approved by the emperor. During this period, cities were categorized as capital, governorate (provincial centers), uezd (county centers), or non-uezd. While the exact number of cities in the Russian Empire changed significantly with every administrative reform, their rights and the process of acquiring the city status remained the same. Since the 19th century, a status called gradonachalstvo was assigned to certain municipalities (for example to Odessa in 1803), positioning a city's administration under a city governor (gradonachalnik) subordinated directly to the governor-general.

According to a decree by Emperor Joseph II on 13 May 1784, cities of Galicia and Lodomeria – then under Austrian rule – were classified into three categories. Lemberg, as the regional capital, was the only first-class city; cities granted privileges by the emperor, such as additional pay for city citizenship, were categorized as royal; and urban settlements with their own magistrates were categorized as municipal. In 1811, cities were defined as populated places with city privileges, while towns were granted only the right to hold fairs.

=== 20th century onward ===
Initially, the Soviet Union retained the Russian Empire's status system, additionally defining cities as urban populated places with more than 10,000 inhabitants and granting the All-Ukrainian Central Executive Committee the authority to change the status of settlements within Soviet Ukraine. In 1925, towns were abolished and replaced with urban-type settlements, although some minor historic cities (such as Chudniv and Olyka) were also classified as urban-type settlements. In 1930, the Central Executive Committee of the Soviet Union specified that cities with fewer than 50,000 inhabitants were subordinated to the raion (district) executive committees, while those with over 50,000 served as separate administrative units subordinated to the presidiums of the republics' executive committees or to oblast (regional) executive committees. Workers' settlements were introduced in 1956 as urban populated places with at least 500 residents, most of whom worked at a single enterprise, but this category was abolished in 1965. Briefly, from 4 September to 30 December 1956, the oblast executive committees were in charge of city status changes.

From 30 December 1956 onward, the authority to change the status was given to the Presidium of the Supreme Soviet of the Ukrainian Soviet Socialist Republic, and cities were divided into three categories of republican, regional, or district significance. Cities of republican significance functioned as first-level administrative divisions not belonging to any oblast (region) or Autonomous Soviet Socialist Republic. They generally had a population of at least one million (at least 500,000 before 12 March 1981) and served as major economic, cultural, and administrative centers. Kiev and Sevastopol were the only Soviet Ukrainian cities with this status, although the latter did not meet the defined population threshold. Cities of regional significance functioned as second-level administrative divisions not belonging to any raion (district), thus forming municipalities that sometimes also included nearby villages. A city of regional significance was required to have a population of at least 50,000 and to possess developed housing and communal services or industry, or to have historic, recreational, or defensive importance, or the potential to develop any of these. All other cities were categorized as cities of district significance, which generally had a population of at least 10,000 and possessed industrial enterprises, a developed economy, state housing stock, or a network of socio-cultural institutions, or the potential to develop any of these.

Until World War II, parts of what is now Ukraine belonged to other states (Northern Bukovina and Bessarabia to Romania, Eastern Galicia and Volhynia to Poland, and Transcarpathia to Czechoslovakia), with city status determined by respective governments under their national laws. From the 1940s onward, the Soviet administrative system already in place elsewhere in Ukraine was extended to these territories.

Since the independence of Ukraine on 24 August 1991, the country has inherited the Soviet system, with all changes in city status done by the Verkhovna Rada (national parliament) instead. Cities of republican significance were renamed to cities with special status with the adoption of the Constitution of Ukraine in 1996, which categorizes Kyiv and Sevastopol as such. The general population threshold for cities of regional significance was lowered to 30,000. Cities of regional and district significance were de facto abolished in 2020 as part of an administrative reform and removed from law in 2023 along with urban-type settlements, which were reclassified as rural settlements. Currently, all populated places in Ukraine are divided into three categories (cities, rural settlements, and villages), a system established by the Constitution.

== Current legislation ==
=== Changes in status ===
Article 85 of the Constitution of Ukraine gives the Verkhovna Rada the power to classify settlements as cities and to establish or change city boundaries. According to the law "On the Procedure for Resolving Certain Issues of the Administrative and Territorial Structure of Ukraine", populated places with a population of more than 10,000 people and a predominantly compact residential area can be classified as cities (mista, sing. misto). The law also defines two categories of settlements with largely farmstead-type residential areas: rural settlements (selyshcha, sing. selyshche), which have a population of at least 5,000, and villages (sela, sing. selo), which have a population of under 5,000. Cities are considered urban populated places, while the other two are rural. The law also provides a concrete procedure for obtaining the city status through a decision by the Verkhovna Rada, following a proposal submitted by the Cabinet of Ministers on the basis of an appeal by the local government after a public discussion. As of July 2026, Slobozhanske in Kharkiv Oblast is the only settlement to have received city status through this procedure, while draft resolutions are registered for Avanhard, Borodianka, and Krasnoilsk on the Verkhovna Rada's website. Another draft resolution for Slobozhanske in Dnipropetrovsk Oblast was withdrawn after concerns were raised that the city status would lead to higher water and transport taxes and require the creation of a separate public utility system, although national law provides no link between these potential consequences and the granting of city status. (Note: The law on transport services distinguishes cities only in that the opening of an intra-regional bus route passing through a city requires approval from the city council; at the same time, it does not connect city status to taxation.)

Since Ukraine's independence on 24 August 1991, but before the aforementioned law came into effect on 26 January 2024, 24 settlements received city status largely on the basis of their historic, cultural, social, or economic importance rather than population: Zlatopil (1991), Svitlodarsk (1992), Hlyniany, Zelenodolsk, Pivdenne, Novodnistrovsk, Burshtyn (1993), Rzhyshchiv (1995), Morshyn (1996), Teplodar (1997), Shumsk (1999), Pereshchepyne, Berezne (2000), Lanivtsi, Baranivka, Lypovets (2001), Olevsk, Mykolaivka (2003), Perechyn (2004), Novyi Kalyniv (2005), Bucha (2007), Baturyn (2008), Chudniv (2012), and Reshetylivka (2017). While this process remains possible, as seen in Olyka becoming a city in April 2025 despite not meeting the population requirements, it is not clearly defined in law, and the ultimate decision in such cases rests with the Verkhovna Rada. As such, special exceptions to the usual procedures may be made, as in the 2022 draft resolution proposing to grant city status to Hostomel solely in recognition of its honorary title Hero City of Ukraine, although the proposal was withdrawn three years later without explanation. Similarly, the Verkhovna Rada has the power to revoke city status, through either the change of city boundaries – which has only happened once, when the city of Inhulets merged into Kryvyi Rih in 2002 – or the reclassification of the city as a rural settlement or a village. The Cabinet of Ministers may also abolish populated places following an appeal by a regional or local government, given that they have been officially fully abandoned for at least three years.

Cities with fewer than 50,000 inhabitants are classified as small cities. As of 2017, residents of small cities make up 22% of Ukraine's urban population. Such cities often face economic or demographic decline, climate change impacts, dependence on local government, and a lack of strategic planning and communication. To address these challenges, the National Program for the Development of Small Cities was created by the government in 2004. This codified legislative agenda aims to stimulate business and industry by fostering economic growth, create job opportunities, develop communication networks, and restore natural areas within small cities, among other goals. The program is financed through the state budget controlled by the Cabinet of Ministers as well as taxes collected by the city councils that are generated by economic growth caused by the program. Although the program identified a number of problems faced by small cities and demonstrated the government's awareness of their importance, it failed to meet its developmental goals by 2009 and was criticized for not addressing the issues efficiently and for duplicating the content of existing legislative acts.

=== Administration and governance ===
Numerous cities host the administrations of hromadas (communities), the country's third-level administrative divisions. The administrations may also be located in rural settlements or villages; however, when they are hosted by cities, they are referred to as city councils, and the corresponding hromadas are classified as urban. Each city council's administration is overseen by an executive committee headed by a mayor, who is elected by the hromada's residents for a five-year term. While the same procedure applies to most settlement and village councils, rural hromadas (whose administrations are located in villages) with fewer than 500 residents may opt out of establishing an executive committee. City, settlement, and village councils are in charge of a wide range of areas, including municipal property management, socio-economic development of the community, housing and municipal services, construction, transport, communications, education, healthcare, sports, and local environmental issues. The minimum number of voters necessary for a local recall petition differs depending on the status of the populated place: 20 for a village, 30 for a rural settlement, 50 for a city of district significance, 200 for a city of regional significance, and 400 for a city with special status. In cities, state or municipal land with an area up to 0.1 ha can be transferred freely to a citizen for the construction of a building; the limit is different for rural settlements (0.15 ha) and villages (0.25 ha).

A city may also be divided into urban districts, which can be established and modified by the city council. The districts are managed directly by the city council, or by separate district councils that can be created by the city council, which also defines their powers and scope. An urban district council elects its own head who oversees its administration. Urban districts may be abolished by the city council following a public discussion. There are 108 urban districts in total across 24 cities: ten in Kyiv; nine each in Donetsk and Kharkiv; eight in Dnipro; seven each in Kryvyi Rih and Zaporizhzhia; six in Lviv; five in Makiivka; four each in Luhansk, Mariupol, Mykolaiv, Odesa, and Sevastopol; three each in Horlivka, Kamianske, Poltava, Simferopol, and Kherson; and two each in Cherkasy, Chernihiv, Kropyvnytskyi, Kremenchuk, Sumy, and Zhytomyr. Chernivtsi and Vinnytsia each formerly had three urban districts, but they were abolished in 2016 and 2012, respectively, while Sumy is also planning to abolish its districts. Just like other populated places and administrative divisions, each city and urban district is assigned a unique code under the national register managed by the Ministry of Communities and Territories Development.

Since Kyiv and Sevastopol are cities with special status and function as first-level administrative divisions, they host their own executive branches separate from the city councils (Kyiv and Sevastopol city state administrations), which are equivalent to the regional (oblast) state administrations. The two cities' urban districts also host urban district state administrations, which operate as counterparts to the district (raion) state administrations. These entities, collectively called local state administrations, are each headed by a head who is appointed by the president on the submission of the Cabinet of Ministers for the head of the state's term of office. In 2015, due to the War in Donbas, local governments close to the frontline were reorganized into civil–military administrations, which were formed of military personnel and headed by leaders that were appointed and dismissed by the National Security and Defense Council of Ukraine. Similarly, since the Russian invasion of Ukraine on 24 February 2022, all local state administrations, as well as many city councils, have been replaced with military administrations, which broadens their power and allows the replacement of civil servants by military personnel while martial law is in effect.

A special case concerns the abandoned cities of Chernobyl and Pripyat, (Note: Also romanized as Chornobyl and Prypiat according to Ukraine's national transliteration system.) which are located within the Chernobyl exclusion zone and are de jure part of Kyiv Oblast, but are de facto managed separately by the State Agency of Ukraine for Exclusion Zone Management subordinated to the Ministry of Energy (or to the Ministry of Environmental Protection and Natural Resources before its dissolution in July 2025). Unlike other populated places in the exclusion zone, the two cities have not lost their status. The 2001 census was not held in the exclusion zone, making its exact population unknown, but it is inhabited by about 50 samosely (illegal residents, largely those who refused to evacuate following the Chernobyl disaster), as well as power plant workers, researchers, and border guards.

== See also ==
- Administrative divisions of Ukraine
- Legal status and local government of Kyiv
- Local government in Ukraine
- Rural settlement (Ukraine)
- Village (Ukraine)
