= Gradina =

Gradina may refer to:

== Places ==
Gradina (a Slavic word for a fortified town) can refer to:

- Gradina (archaeology), a type of medieval Slavonic fortified settlement

=== Bosnia and Herzegovina ===
- Gradina, Cazin, a village near Cazin
- Gradina, Derventa, a village near Derventa
- Gradina, Fojnica, a village near Fojnica
- Gradina, Gacko, a village near Gacko
- Gradina, Kalinovik, a village near Kalinovik
- Gradina, Prijedor, a village near Prijedor
- Gradina, Travnik, a village near Travnik
- Gradina, Velika Kladuša, a village near Velika Kladuša
- Gradina, Vlasenica, a village near Vlasenica
- Gradina, Zenica, a village near Zenica
- Gornja Gradina, a village near Kozarska Dubica
- Gradina Donja, a village near Kozarska Dubica

=== Bulgaria ===
- Gradina, Pleven Province, a village in Dolni Dabnik Municipality
- Gradina, Plovdiv Province, a village in Parvomay Municipality
- Gradina, Razgrad Province, a village in Loznitsa Municipality

=== Croatia ===
- Gradina, Virovitica-Podravina County, a village and a municipality in eastern Croatia
- Gradina, Šibenik-Knin County, a village near Šibenik
- Gradina, Istria County, a village near Vrsar

=== Kosovo ===
- Gradina (peak), a mountain peak on the Crnoljeva Mountain

=== Montenegro ===
- Gradina, Danilovgrad, an ancient settlement near Danilovgrad
- Gradina, Žabljak, a village near Žabljak
- Gradina, Pljevlja, a village near Pljevlja
- Gradina, Cetinje, a village near Cetinje

=== Serbia ===
- Gradina, Postenje, na archaeological site in Serbia, part of UNESCO World Heritage Site Stari Ras in Serbia
- Gradina, Jelica, an archaeological site near Čačak
- Gradina, Novi Rakovac, an archaeological site on Fruška Gora
- Bosut Gradina, a prehistorical archaeological site in Srem
- Drežnička Gradina, a mountain in western Serbia

== Other uses ==
- Gradina (tool) is also a toothed chisel used in making sculptures
- Gradina Cismigiu
- Gradina Tower
- Timișoara Zoological Garden
- Kopitareva Gradina

== See also ==
- Gradinje (disambiguation)
