= Gorod =

Gorod may refer to:

- Gord (archaeology), a Slavic word meaning "town" that appears in numerous Slavic toponyms – see: Gorod (toponymy), Horod, or Grad (toponymy)
- Gorod (band), a French technical death metal band
- Gorod-Makit, a peak in Amur Oblast, Russia

== See also ==
- Gulyay-gorod, a mobile "walled town" used for defense on the featureless steppe
- Gord (disambiguation)
