= Podgora =

Podgora may refer to several places:

== Bosnia and Herzegovina ==
- Podgora, Breza, a village
- Podgora, Fojnica, a village
- Podgora, Lopare, a village
- Podgora, Milići, a village near Milići

== Croatia ==
- Podgora, Dubrovnik-Neretva County, a village in Dubrovačko Primorje
- Podgora, Split-Dalmatia County, a coastal town near Makarska
- Podgora, Krapina-Zagorje County, a village near Kumrovec
- Podgora Turkovska, a village near Delnice

== Italy ==
- Podgora (hill), a hill near Gorizia

== Kosovo ==
- Podgora (region), a region in Metohija

== Montenegro ==
- Podgora, Cetinje, a village
- Podgora, Žabljak, a village

== Poland ==
- Podgóra, Piaseczno County, a village in the gmina Góra
- Podgóra, Radom County, a village in the gmina Gózd

== Slovenia ==
- Dolenja Podgora, a village near Črnomelj
- Gorenja Podgora, a village near Črnomelj
- Podgora, Dobrepolje, a village
- Podgora (Ljubljana), a former settlement near the city
- Podgora pri Dolskem, a village near Dol pri Ljubljani
- Podgora pri Ložu, a village near Loška Dolina
- Podgora pri Zlatem Polju, a village near Lukovica
- Podgora, Ravne na Koroškem, a village
- Podgora, Šmartno ob Paki, a village
- Podgora, Straža, a village

== Serbia ==
- Podgora (region)
