= Populated places in Ukraine =

In Ukraine, the term populated place (Ukrainian: населений пункт, romanized: naselenyi punkt) refers to a structured component of the human settlement system, representing a stationary community within a territorially cohesive and compact area characterized by a significant concentration of population. Its defining attribute is the continuous presence of human inhabitants. Populated places in Ukraine are classified into two primary categories: urban and rural. Urban populated places are cities, whereas rural areas include villages and selyshches.

All populated places are governed by their hromada (municipality), be it a village, a settlement, or a city. A municipality may consist of one or several populated places, and is (except Kyiv and Sevastopol) a constituent part of a raion (district) which in turn is a constituent of an oblast (province).

Besides regular populated places in Ukraine, that are part of administrative division and population census, there are several additional categories for populated places that are used for other purposes. Among such categories are mountainous populated places, historic populated places, and others.

The 2015 law on decommunization required populated places and toponymy related to Ukraine's past in the Soviet Union to be renamed. Leading to a string of new Ukrainian toponyms. On 21 March 2023, about a year after the 2022 Russian invasion of Ukraine and subsequent occupation of parts of Ukraine by Russia, the Ukrainian parliament adopted the law "On the Condemnation and Prohibition of Propaganda of Russian Imperial Policy in Ukraine and the Decolonization of Toponymy", which is set to change the names of places associated with Russian imperialism. In the law's explanatory note was stated this was "a ban on assigning geographic objects names that glorify, perpetuate, promote, or symbolize the occupying state."

== Definition by the 2024 Law of Ukraine ==
The Law of Ukraine of 28.07.2023 № 3285-IX "About the procedure for solving certain issues of the administrative and territorial system of Ukraine" established the following terminology regarding populated places:

1. A populated place (населений пункт, naselenyi punkt) is a compactly inhabited place of residence of people, which was formed as a result of historical traditions, economic and other activities, has a stable population composition, its own name, and a separate territory with boundaries established in accordance with the law.

2. According to the criteria of urban development and socio-economy, cities (mista), settlements (selyshcha), and villages (sela) are categorized as populated places (naseleni punkty).

3. A city (місто, misto) is a populated place with mostly compact residential areas, the total population of which is at least 10,000.

4. A settlement (селище, selyshche) is a populated place with mostly farmstead-type residences, the total number of inhabitants of which is at least 5,000.

5. A village (село, selo) is a populated place with farmstead-type residences, the total number of inhabitants of which is less than 5,000.

6. Cities (mista) are urban, and settlements (selyshcha) and villages (sela) are rural populated places.

7. Other settlements (поселення, poselennia), which are compact places of residence of people outside a populated place, which does not have a stable population structure and is not classified as a "populated place". Examples of such places are dacha (cottage or exurb) settlements or temporary settlements for displaced persons.

8. Populated places could be formed based on other settlements (poselen) in order proscribed by this law.

In particular, the Soviet era category of urban-type settlement (селище міського типу, selyshche miskoho typu) was abolished.

The law also regulates the official reclassification of the type of a populated place. The law also uses various forms of settlement such as poselennia, which could semantically mean a temporarily inhibited place.

== Cities ==
City with special status is treated as a city-region. Most cities in Ukraine are the centres of the corresponding hromada. Two cities (Chernobyl and Pripyat) are abandoned and are governed by the State Agency of Ukraine on the Exclusion Zone Management.

City status a populated place receives on a decision of the Verkhovna Rada of Ukraine.

Cities that have population of less than 50,000 are considered to be small cities and fall under a special state program in development of small cities.

According to the 2001 Ukrainian Census there are 454 cities in Ukraine, among which are two with special status (Kyiv and Sevastopol).

== Rural populated places ==
Rural populated places (Ukrainian: сільські населені пункти) or rural localities can refer to two different types of inhabited places: selyshches and villages.

=== Settlements ===
Until 2023, the term selyshche (Ukrainian: селище, lit. 'settlement') had a double meaning within the administrative-territorial system of Ukraine. Introduced in 1925, it was used either for urban-type settlements or for some smaller populated places which were often part of a rural silrada (rural council). In 1925, it replaced another term known as mistechko. Officially, the term settlement, unless specified, meant to be an urban-type settlement, which was a variation of an urban populated place. At the same time, less populated places, which were also known as settlements within a silrada (rural council), were not defined. Unlike other nomenclatures for populated places, in the Constitution of Ukraine, the term urban-type settlement was not fully defined and was part of the Soviet legislature, which was conditionally grandfathered into the Ukrainian legislature. In 2023, a law was passed to finally eliminate any deviations or variations of the term settlement, clearly categorizing them, along with villages, as a type of rural populated place. The law also merged the two categories that existed de facto in Ukraine.

The 2023 law "About the order to solve separate issues of the administrative and territorial system of Ukraine", defines a settlement (selyshche) (Ukrainian: селище, lit. 'settlement' as a rural populated place with predominantly private housing total population of which is no less than 5,000 people.

According to the 2001 Ukrainian Census, there were 1,266 settlements in Ukraine (excluding urban-type settlements, which still existed at the time and some of which were reclassified as selyshche).

=== Villages ===
Village as a term became systematic for a conventional rural populated place and is the most common of all terms used for populated places in a country. A rural hromada may be composed of a single village or group of villages. According to the 2001 Ukrainian Census, there were 27,190 villages in Ukraine that were organized into 10,278 rural (village) councils.

The 2023 law "About the order to solve separate issues of the administrative and territorial system of Ukraine" defines a village (Ukrainian: село, romanized: selo, IPA: [seˈlɔ]) as a populated place with predominantly a private housing total population of which is less than 5,000 people.

== Mountainous populated places ==
In 1995, the special category of mountainous populated places was created. Mountainous status is received by populated places in mountainous areas that have inadequately developed sphere of employment and social services as well as a limited transportation access (low development density of infrastructure or infrastructure is weak). As of 2026, all such settlements are located in the Carpathian regions of Chernivtsi, Lviv, Ivano-Frankivsk, and Zakarpattia oblasts.

== Historic types of populated places ==
Among historic types of populated places in Ukraine are places like khutir, prysilok, zymivnyk, mistechko, sloboda (wolia), horod. In addition to that, there were craftsmen's towns such as huta, buda, and several others. Following the spread of the Soviet regime in Ukraine in the late 1918s, the introduction of collective and/or soviet farms used to be based either on an individual settlement (village) or included several neighboring rural settlements (villages, khutirs, slobodas).

Ukrainian khutirs were destroyed in 1930s–1940s during the Soviet occupation as part of the fight with individual farming (dekulakization campaign).

Urban-type settlements in Ukraine were a type of populated place in Ukraine from 1925 until 2024, deriving from a Soviet invented term for a populated place with some degree of urbanization or in proximity to an urbanized area. In the Constitution of Ukraine, urban settlement is mentioned simply as selysche (a settlement), which also adds another ambiguity to the administrative territorial system of Ukraine. The term selysche is also used to some smaller populated places, which can be found within other administrative territorial subdivisions. Those settlements are implicitly known as rural settlements, while often presented simply as selysches. According to the 2001 Ukrainian Census, there were 890 urban-type settlements in Ukraine. The designation was abolished in late January 2024 as part of the decommunization of Ukraine's settlement classification system.

== See also ==
- Geography of Ukraine
- ISO 3166-2:UA
- List of cities in Ukraine, sortable list of cities by region and population
- List of places named after people (Ukraine)
- The History of Cities and Villages of the Ukrainian SSR, a comprehensive encyclopedic compilation of all populated places
