= Gradina Tower =

Gradina Tower is a remainder of a military fortification (Gradina) in the village of Radljevo, 11 kilometers from Ivanjica, in Serbia. Today, the tower is a culturally-historical monument.

The monument consists of a tower and remains of a bastion of a military fortification. Next to the fortress, there is a church dedicated to St. Elias.

To the ramparts, whose highest point is at 635m, leads a steep winding dirt road. From one side protected by Moravica and the rocks, this object could easily control communication route from Užice to Sjenica, but also the one that leads to the valley of the Ibar River.

== History ==
It is estimated that the tower was built in the 13th or 14th century, on the basis of method of construction walls and ceramic material found in the tower. Fragments of polished containers and findings of archaic majolica inside of the investigated tower, indicate that the tower existed in the second half of the 14th century.

Prehistoric pottery located at the foot of the fortification extend the importance of the site for several epochs.

As at that time the center of the župa, as a rule, was a fortified town, on the basis of archaeological material it is assumed that this was the site of the city of Moravica, located in the center of the župa of the same name. It is assumed that the wider basin of Moravica is hiding vast archaeological treasures. Scientists who worked on the project Serbian lands in the Middle Ages from the Historical Institute in Belgrade during the 2006 and 2008 have estimated that Ivanjica region has a very large archaeological potential, but it is one of the least explored.

Sporadic research was also conducted at sites of Erčege, Lisa, Radaljevo, where presumably another fort could be. Some archaeological artifacts have been found in the villages of Bukovica and Kušići. In this region was also found a collection of silver coins dating from the 2nd century of the new era.
