= Wagon fort =

Military defense formation

A wagon fort, wagon fortress, wagenburg, or corral, often referred to as circling the wagons, is a temporary fortification made of wagons arranged into a rectangle, circle, or other shape and possibly joined with each other to produce an improvised military camp. It is also known as a laager (from Afrikaans), especially in historical African contexts, and a tabor (from Polish/Ukrainian/Russian) among the Cossacks.

== Overview ==
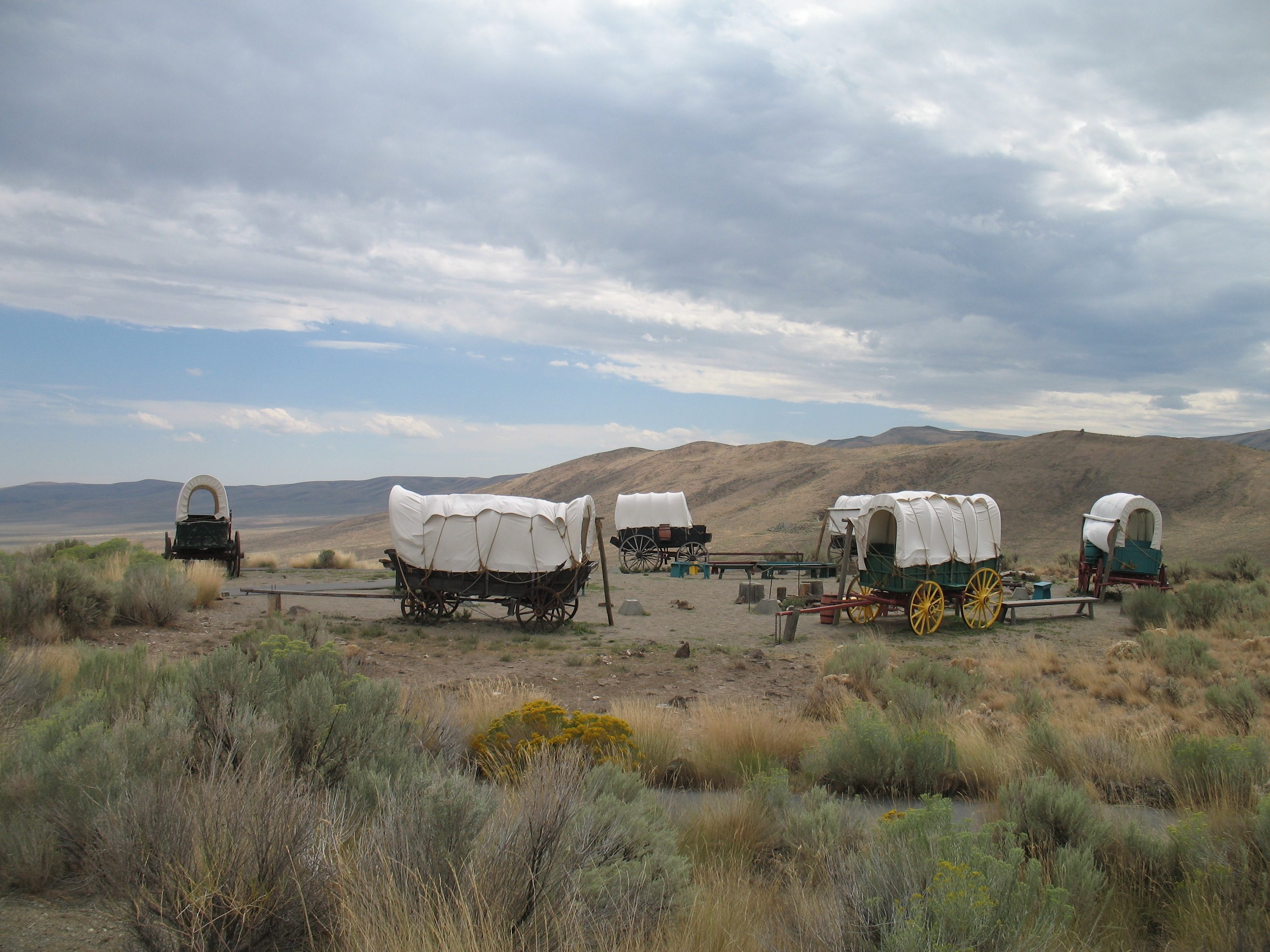
Circled wagons

Ammianus Marcellinus, a Roman army officer and historian of the 4th century, describes a Roman army advancing "ad carraginem" as they approach a Gothic camp, notably during the Battle of Adrianople. Historians interpret this as a wagon-fort. Notable historical examples include the Hungarians using it during the Hungarian invasions of Europe, the Hussites, who called it vozová hradba ("wagon wall"), known under the German translation Wagenburg ("wagon fort/fortress"), tabors in the armies of the Polish–Lithuanian Commonwealth and Cossacks, and the laager of settlers in South Africa.

Similar, ad hoc, defensive formations used in the United States were called corrals. These were traditionally used by 19th-century American settlers traveling to the West in convoys of Conestoga wagons.

== History ==
=== Chinese ===
One of the earliest written claims of using conjoined mobile shields as fortification is described in the Chinese historical record Book of Han. During the 119 BC Battle of Mobei of the Han–Xiongnu War, the famous Han general Wei Qing led his army through a fatiguing expeditionary march across the Gobi Desert only to find Yizhixie chanyu's main force waiting to encircle them on the other side. Using armored heavy wagons known as "Wu Gang Wagon" (Chinese: 武剛車) in ring formations, which provided Chinese archers, crossbowmen, and infantry protection from the Xiongnu's powerful cavalry charges, and allowed Han troops to utilize their ranged weapons' advantages of precision. Wei Qing neutralised the Xiongnu's initial cavalry charges, forcing a stalemate and buying time for his troops to recover strength, before using the cover of a sandstorm to launch a counteroffensive which overran the nomads.

=== Czechs and Hussites ===
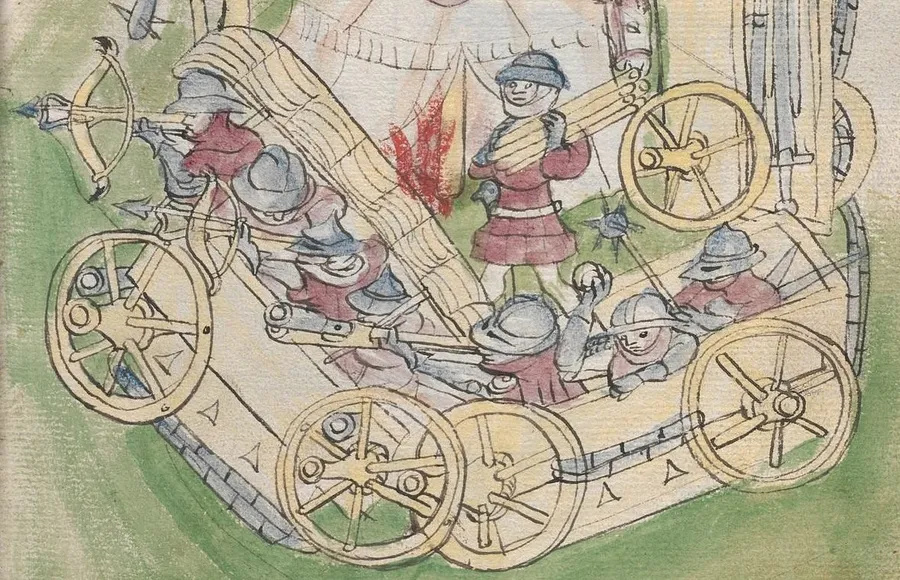
The Hussite wagenburg

In the 15th century, during the Hussite Wars, the Hussites developed tactics of using the tabors, called vozová hradba in Czech or Wagenburg by the Germans, as mobile fortifications. It was first used in the Battle of Nekmíř. When the Hussite army faced a numerically superior opponent, the Bohemians usually formed a square of the armed wagons, joined them with iron chains, and defended the resulting fortification against charges of the enemy. Such a camp was easy to establish and practically invulnerable to enemy cavalry. The etymology of the word tabor may come from the Hussite fortress and modern day Czech town of Tábor, which itself is a name derived from biblical Jezreel mountain Tabor (in Hebrew תבור).

The crew of each wagon consisted of 18 to 21 soldiers: 4 to 8 crossbowmen, 2 handgunners, 6 to 8 soldiers equipped with pikes or flails, 2 shield carriers, and 2 drivers. The wagons would normally form a square, and inside the square would usually be the cavalry. There were two principal stages of the battle using the wagon fort: defensive and counterattack. The defensive part would be a pounding of the enemy with artillery. The Hussite artillery was a primitive form of a howitzer, called in Czech a houfnice, from which the English word howitzer comes. Furthermore, they called their guns the Czech word píšťala (hand cannon), in that they were shaped like a pipe or a fife, from which the word pistol is possibly derived. When the enemy approached near enough, crossbowmen and hand-gunners emerge from the wagons and inflict more casualties at close range. There would even be stones stored in a pouch inside the wagons for throwing should the soldiers run out of ammunition. After this huge barrage, the enemy would be demoralized. The armies of the anti-Hussite crusaders were usually heavily armored knights. Hussite tactics were to disable the knights' horses so that the dismounted (and ponderous) knights would be easier targets. Once the commander saw fit, the second stage of battle would begin. Men with swords, flails, and polearms would spring out and attack the weary enemy. Alongside this infantry, cavalry would leave the square and strike. The enemy would be eliminated, or very nearly so.

The wagon fort was later used by the crusading anti-Hussite armies at the Battle of Tachov (1427). Anti-Hussite German forces, unfamiliar with this type of strategy, were defeated. The Hussite wagon fort strategy failed at the Battle of Lipany (1434), where the Utraquist faction of Hussites defeated the Taborite faction. On a hill within a wagon fort, they were drawn into charging out prematurely, when their enemy pretended to retreat. The Utraquists would be reconciled with the Catholic Church afterward. Thus, the wagon fort's impact on Czech history ended. The first victory against the wagon fort at the Battle of Tachov showed that the best ways to defeat it were to prevent it from being erected in the first place or to get the men inside to charge out prematurely after a feint. Such solutions meant the fortification lost its prime advantage. The importance of the wagon fort in Czech history diminished, but the Czechs would continue to use the wagon forts in later conflicts. After the Hussite Wars, foreign powers such as the Hungarians and Poles who had confronted the destructive forces of Hussites, hired thousands of Czech mercenaries (such as into the Black Army of Hungary). Hungarian general John Hunyadi studied the Hussites' tactics, he applied its featuring elements in his army during the Hungarian–Ottoman Wars, including the use of war wagons as a mobile fortress called szekérvár in Hungarian. At the Battle of Varna in 1444, it is said that 600 Bohemian handgunners (men armed with early shoulder arms) defended a wagon fortification.

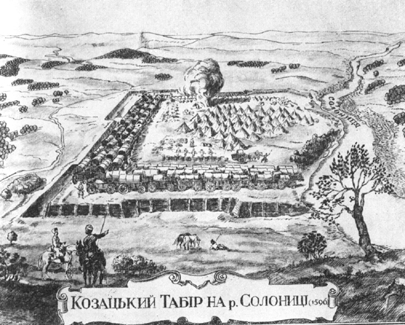
A Cossack wagon camp at Solonytsia in 1596

=== Zaporozhian Cossacks ===
Cossack wagon forts had their predecessors in the tactics used by Rus' druzhina troops against Polovtsians. They were actively used by Hryhoriy Loboda at Bila Tserkva, during raids against Crimea and in the 1637 Pavliuk Uprising. During the Khmelnytskyi Uprising, the tactic significantly influenced the outcome of battles at Starokostiantyniv, Pyliavtsi, Berestechko, Loyew, Bila Tserkva and Okhmativ. However, by the end of the 17th century the wagon fort was rendered obsolete due to the rapid development of artillery.

=== Elsewhere ===
The Germans would also use wagons for fortification. They used much cheaper materials than the Hussites, and different wagons for infantry and artillery. The Russians also used a type of movable fortress, called a guliai-gorod in the 16th century.

A Danish peasant rebellion in 1441, culminating in the battle of St. Jørgensbjerg also used the war fortresses. The leader of the Danish peasants were led by Henrik Reventlow who had participated in the Hussite Wars and had learned of the war fortress by participating in Albert II's war against the Hussite. There he saw what a formidable defence the war fortress was, and then used it in the peasant rebellion. While it is not certain how the fortress was built, it still played a crucial role in defending Husby against a more well equipped army under Christopher of Bavaria. While the fortress did defend Husby initially, Henrik's army was defeated after much of his army had left. The casualties of the peasant army is speculated to be 6,000-25,000. Henrik was executed shortly after by Christoffer.

Another use of this tactic was the very similar infantry squares deployed by Wellington at the Battle of Waterloo. Likewise the South African laager. The wagon forts would form into squares, supporting each other. Were an assault made between two forts, marksmen from both would easily exploit the advantage and kill many of the enemy.

== Variations ==
=== Laager ===
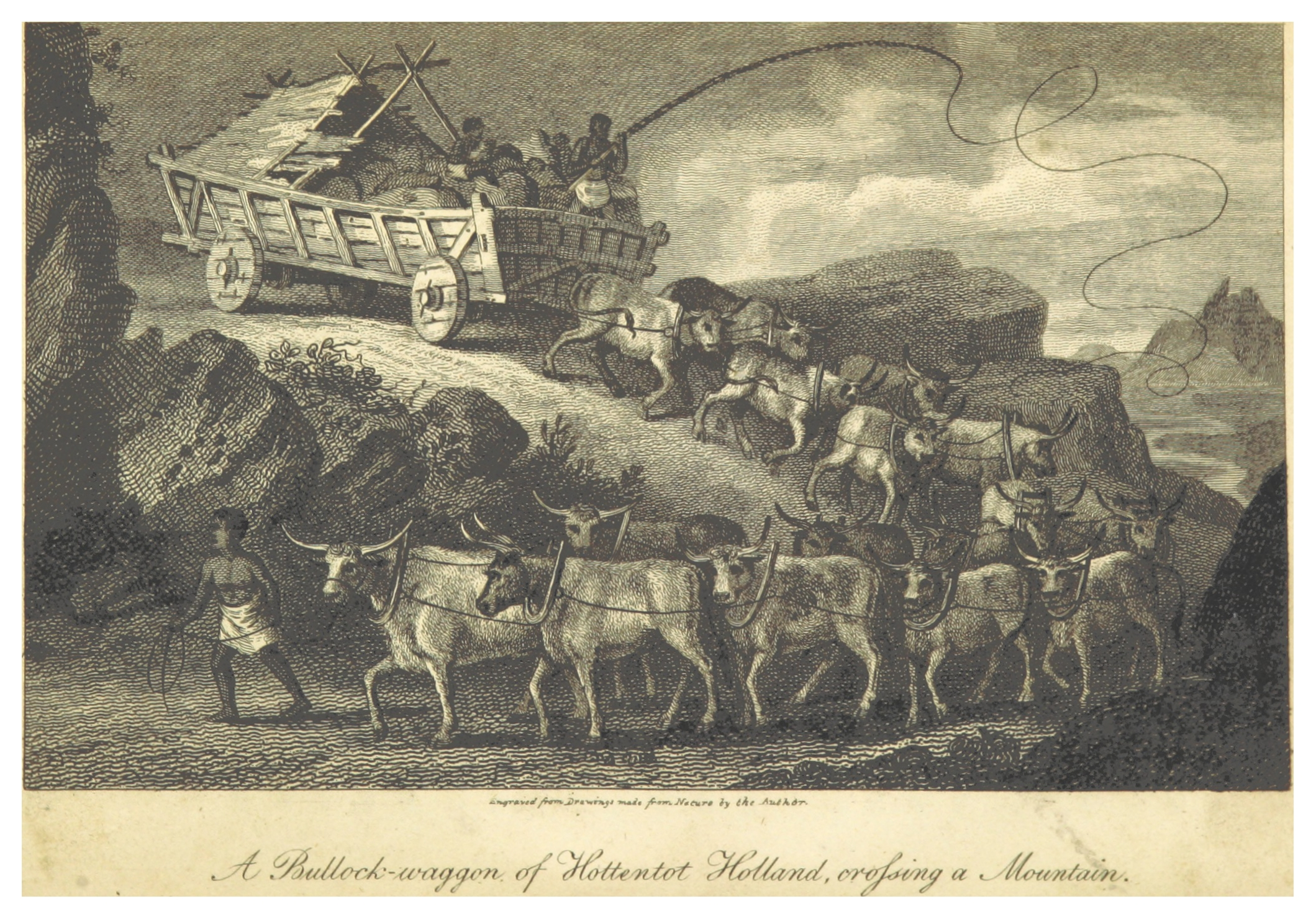
A romanticized depiction of the Great Trek

The English word laager comes from the obsolete Afrikaans word lager (now laer), which comes from the German word Lager ("camp" or "lair") and the Dutch leger which also gives English 'leaguer' ("military camp"). The word refers to the ancient defensive formation used by travelers throughout the world in dangerous situations in which they would draw wagons into a circle and place cattle and horses on the inside to protect them from raiders or nocturnal animals. Laagers were extensively used by the Voortrekkers of the Great Trek during the 1830s. The laager was put to the ultimate test on 16 December 1838, when an army of 10,000–15,000 Zulu Impis besieged and were defeated by approximately 460 Voortrekkers in the aptly named Battle of Blood River. In 19th-century America, the same approach was used by pioneers who would "circle the wagons" in case of attack.

Leaguer was used in the British Army for temporary overnight camps made by armored formations.

=== Tabor ===
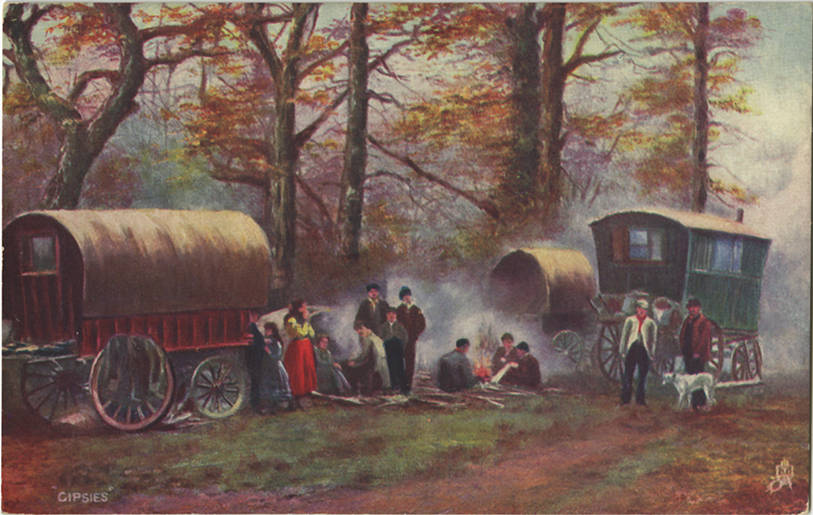
Oilette postcard view of a Romani camp

A tabor is a convoy or a camp formed by horse-drawn wagons. For example, nomadic Romani used to wander and camp in tabor formations. Tabors supported the armies in Europe between the 13th and 20th centuries. Tabors usually followed the armies and carried all the necessary supplies and rear units, such as field kitchens, armorers or shoemakers. The tactics were later copied by various armies of Central Europe, including the army of the Polish–Lithuanian Commonwealth.

In the 16th and 17th centuries, these tactics were also mastered by the Cossacks, who used their tabors (Ukrainian: табір, romanized: tabir) for the protection of marching troops as well. Among Ukrainian Cossacks, a tabir would be formed from several rows of wagons positioned on both flanks of the marching column. Before battle, the wagons would be joined with chains and formed into a quadrangle, around which additionall fortifications would be constructed. In this way, the tabir served as a base for artillery, infantry and cavalry attacks against the enemy.

== See also ==
- Troop sleeper
- Circle the wagons
