= Novigrad =

Novigrad (meaning "New Town" or "New City") may refer to:

== Settlements ==
=== in Croatia ===
- Novigrad, Istria County, a town in Istria County
- Novigrad, Zadar County, a municipality in Zadar County
- Novigrad na Dobri, a village in Netretić Municipality, Karlovac County
- Novigrad Podravski, a municipality in Koprivnica-Križevci County

=== in Arts and Entertainment ===
- Novigrad (The Free City), an important location within the fictional universe of The Witcher

== See also ==
- Novi grad (disambiguation)
- Novgorod (disambiguation), the same kind of name in Russian
- Nowogród (disambiguation), the same kind of name in Polish
- Starigrad (disambiguation)
- Grad (toponymy)
