= Novgorodsky =

Novgorodsky (masculine), Novgorodskaya (feminine), or Novgorodskoye (neuter) is a Russian surname and indicates someone who came from Veliky Novgorod which is one of the oldest cities in Russia. may refer to:

- Novgorodsky District, a district of Novgorod Oblast, Russia
- Novgorodsky (inhabited locality) (Novgorodskaya, Novgorodskoye), name of several rural localities in Russia
- Novgorod Oblast (Novgorodskaya oblast), a federal subject of Russia

== People with the surname ==
- Dmitri Novgorodsky (born 1965), Russian pianist

== See also ==
- Novgorod (disambiguation)
- New York, Ukraine, formerly known as Novgorodskoye in Russian until 2021.
