= Mestecko =

Mestecko may refer to:

- Městečko, a municipality and village in the Czech Republic
- Mestečko, a municipality and village in Slovakia
- Městys, formerly also called městečko, a municipal status

== See also ==
- Mestechko
