= Gornji Grad =

Gornji Grad (lit. 'upper castle' or 'upper town') may refer to:

- Gornji Grad, Slovenia, a town northwest of Ljubljana and west of Celje
- Gornji Grad, Zagreb, a historic city district of the Croatian capital
- Gornji Grad, Osijek, a historic city district of Osijek, Croatia
- Gornji Grad, Zemun, an urban neighborhood of Belgrade, Serbia

== See also ==
- Donji Grad (disambiguation)
- Novi Grad (disambiguation)
- Stari Grad (disambiguation)
- Grad (toponymy)
