= Mala Vas, Dobrepolje =

Mala Vas
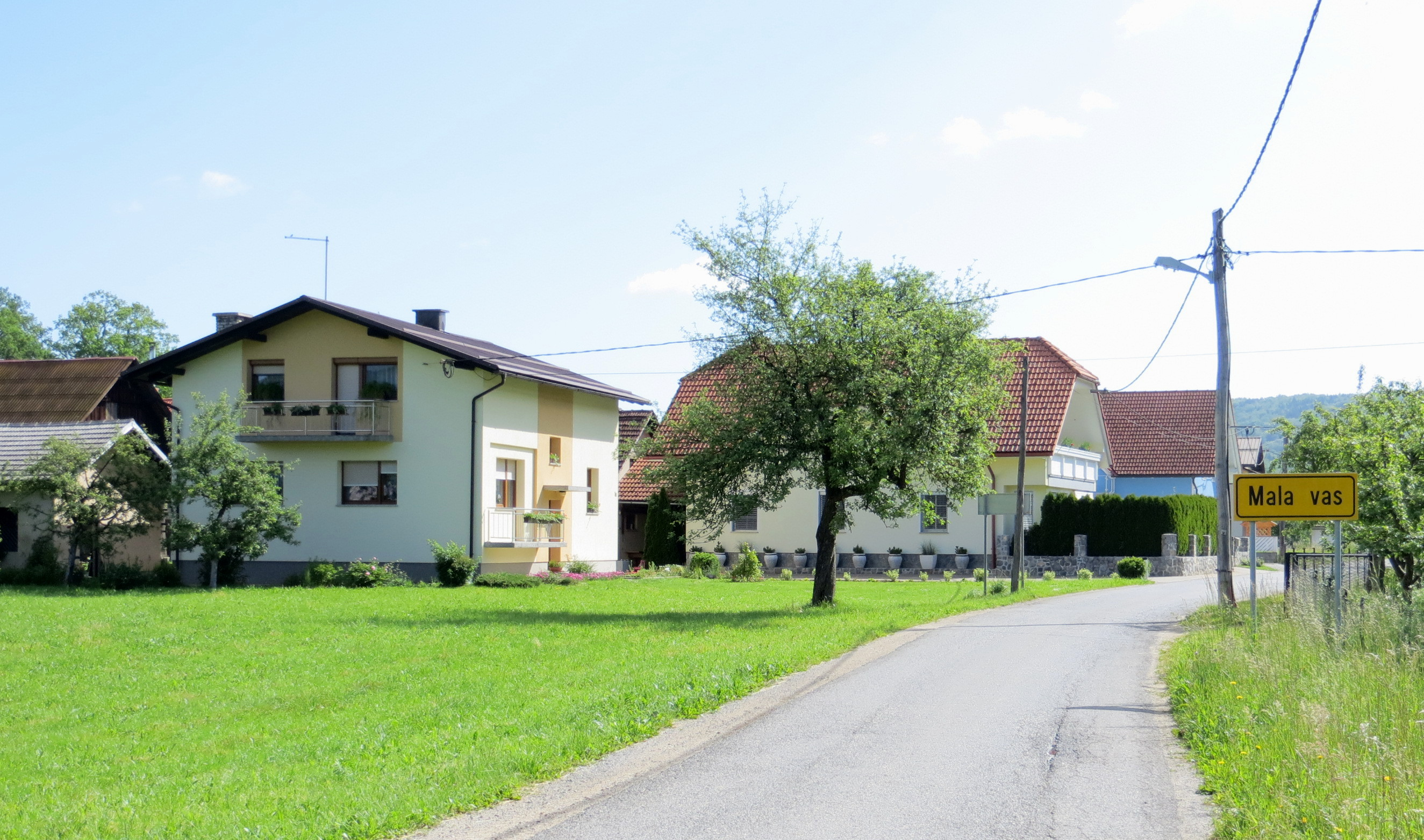

- Location in Slovenia
- Coordinates: 45°51′9.06″N 14°42′35.57″E
- Country: Slovenia
- Traditional region: Lower Carniola
- Statistical region: Central Slovenia
- Municipality: Dobrepolje

Area
  - Total: 3.83 km^{2} (1.48 sq mi)
- Elevation: 440.3 m (1,445 ft)

Population (2020)
  - Total: 124
  - Density: 32.4/km^{2} (83.9/sq mi)

Mala Vas (pronounced [ˈmaːla ˈʋaːs]; Slovene: Mala vas) is a village in the Municipality of Dobrepolje in Slovenia. It lies just east of Videm and its territory extends eastwards to the peak of Mala Vas Hill (Malovaški hrib, 596 m). The area is part of the historical region of Lower Carniola. The municipality is now included in the Central Slovenia Statistical Region.

== Mass grave ==
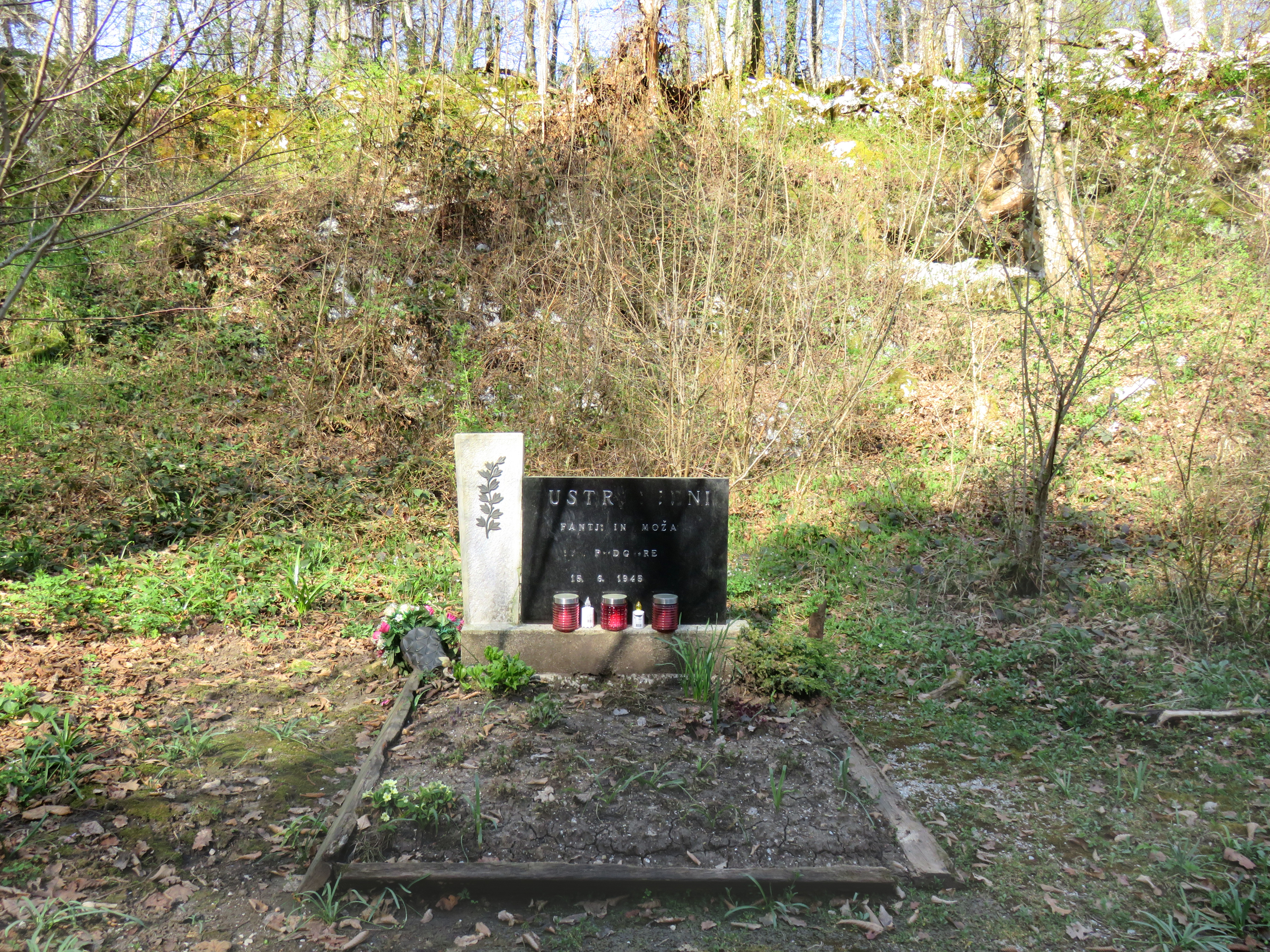
The Mala Vas Mass Grave

Mala Vas is the site of a mass grave from the period immediately after the Second World War. The Mala Vas Mass Grave (Slovene: Grobišče Mala vas) is located in a sinkhole in the woods west of the village, marked with a stone with an inscription. It contains the remains of eight civilians from the village of Podgora murdered on the night of 16 June 1945.
