= Podgrad =

Podgrad means 'below the castle' in Slovene. There are several small settlements or villages named Podgrad in Slovenia.

- Podgrad, Gornja Radgona, a village in the Municipality of Gornja Radgona, northeastern Slovenia
- Podgrad, Ilirska Bistrica, a village in the Municipality of Ilirska Bistrica, southwestern Slovenia
- Podgrad, Ljubljana, a village in the City Municipality of Ljubljana, central Slovenia
- Podgrad, Novo Mesto, a village in the City Municipality of Novo Mesto, southeastern Slovenia
- Podgrad na Pohorju, a village in the Municipality of Slovenska Bistrica, northeastern Slovenia
- Podgrad, Šentjur, a village in the Municipality of Šentjur, eastern Slovenia
- Podgrad pri Vremah, a settlement in Municipality of Divača, southwestern Slovenia

== See also ==
- Podgora (disambiguation)
