= Supernumerary town =

Type of city in the Russian Empire

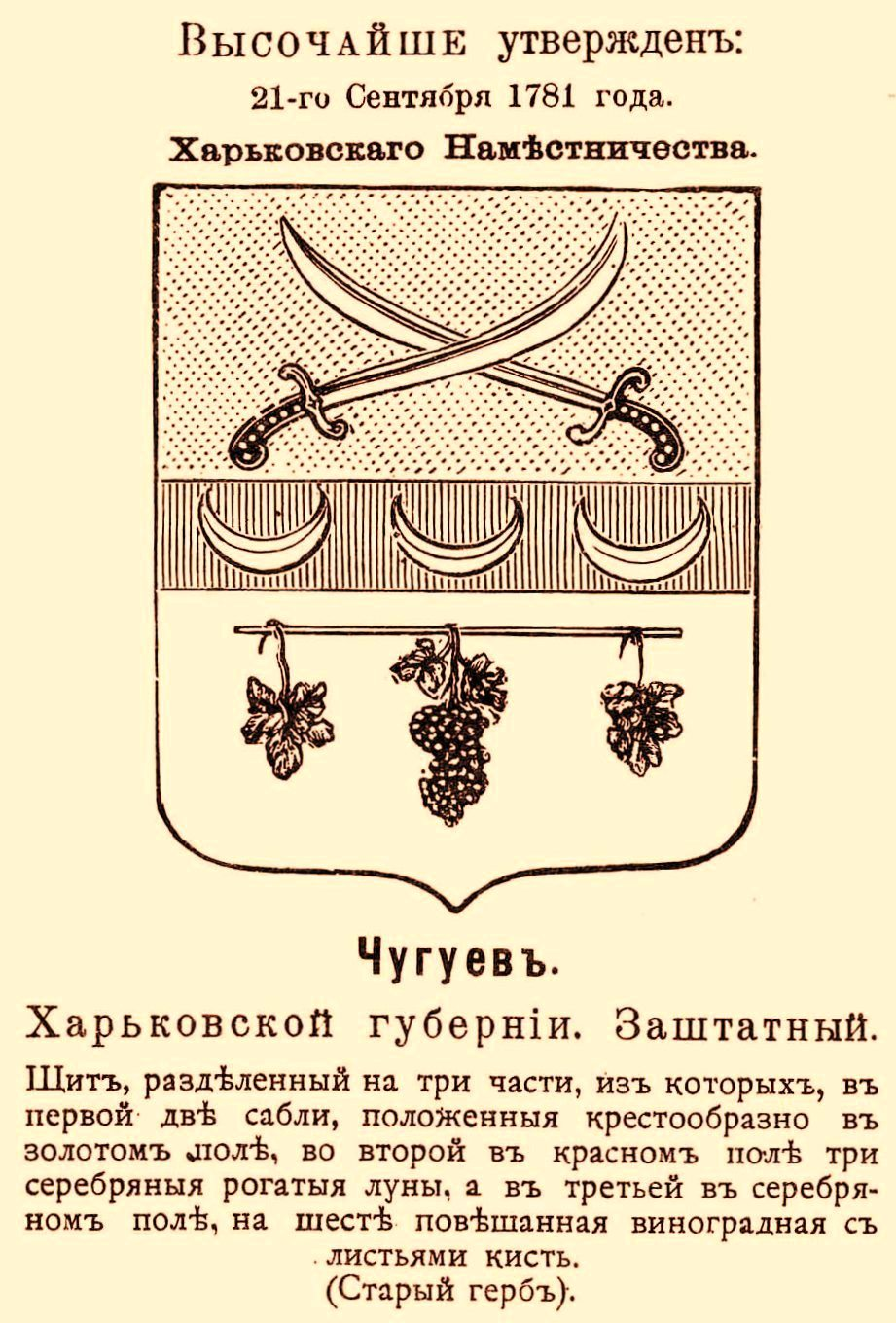
Coat of arms of the supernumerary city of Chuguyev

Supernumerary town (Russian: Заштатный город, romanized: zashtatny; Безуездный город, pre-reform orthography: Безъуѣздный городъ, romanized: bezuyezdny gorod, lit. 'county-less city') was a type of a city in the Russian Empire which was not an administrative center of any territory.

During administrative-territorial reforms of Catherine II of Russia, when an uezd was disbanded, its administrative centre typically lost its status as a town, with the corresponding loss of urban privileges of its inhabitants. To bypass this, a new category of urban settlements was introduced.

The 1796 reform of the administrative division by Emperor Paul I of Russia decreased the number of uyezds and their centers were reclassified as supernumerary towns. The reform established the population number as a criterion for a supernumerary town.

In the second half of the 19th century the governorate centres constituted 8 percent of cities, uezd cities counted 71 percent, and supernumerary towns counted 21 percent.

Over time the term zashtatny gorod has acquired the meaning of an insignificant/backwater town.

== See also ==
- Mestechko (disambiguation)
- Posad
