= Novo Naselje =

Novo Naselje (lit. 'new settlement') may refer to the following places in Serbia:

- Bistrica, Novi Sad, also known as Novo Naselje
- Aleksandrovo, Subotica, also known as Novo Naselje
- Novo Naselje, Padinska Skela, Serbia

== See also ==
- Novo Selo (disambiguation)
- Novi Grad (disambiguation)
