= Gulyay-gorod =

15th-17th century mobile fortification

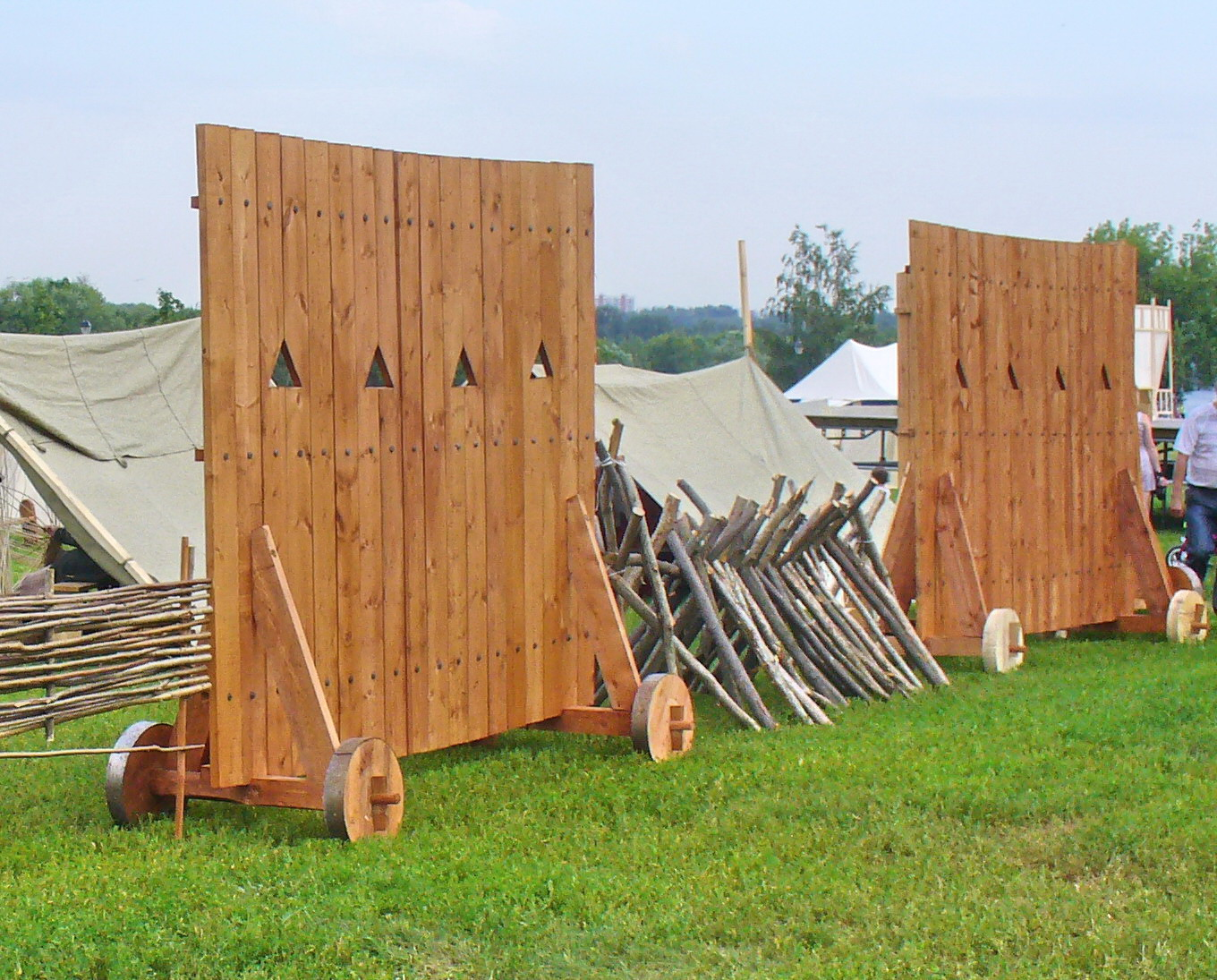
Gulyay-gorod reconstruction.

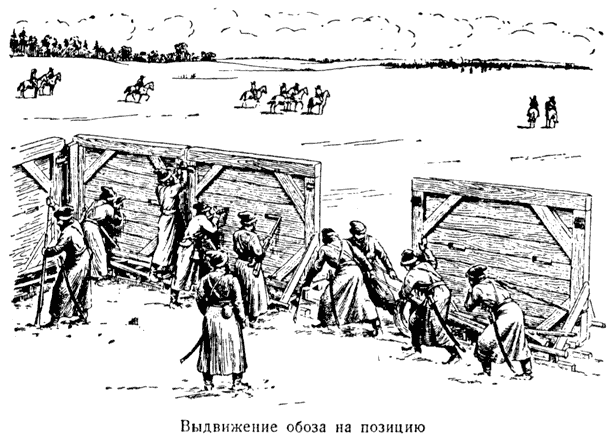
Pulling shields into position.

Gulyay-gorod, also guliai-gorod (Russian: Гуля́й-го́род, lit. 'wandering town'), was a mobile fortification used by the Russian army between the 16th and the 17th centuries.

== History and terminology ==
The use of term gulyay-gorod is noted in sources from the 1530s, during the Russo-Kazan Wars, and it was understood not only as a type of wagon-fort, but also as siege towers. Later, this term could cover mobile barriers like the cheval de frise. It was probably just an adaptation of the German term "wagenburg". At first, it was used to cover artillery during the siege of fortresses. In 1572, gulyay-gorod was very successfully used by the commander Prince Mikhail Vorotynsky in the heavy field battle of Molodi. So in the following years, the use of gulyay-gorod expanded, and pre-made shields were stored not only in the border fortresses, but also near Moscow. For the transportation and equipment of Gulyai-gorod, a special voivode was appointed, who had a separate cavalry detachment for reconnaissance. Giles Fletcher, the Elder, English ambassador to Russia, left an early Western description of the gulyay-gorod in his Of the Russe Common Wealth (1591).

At the end of the 16th century, the term "gulyai-gorod" was gradually replaced by the term "oboz", literally "wagon train". A Russian eyewitness describes how, during the next invasion of the Crimean Tatars in 1591, Russian troops retreated to Moscow and defended themselves in the "wagon train" — "and by the ancient name - gulyay". At the beginning of the 17th century, another term appeared to denote a mobile fortification - "tabor".

Additionally, for much of the 16-18th centuries, the Zaporozhian Cossacks used this type of fortification extensively, as for example by Bohdan Khmelnytsky during the siege of Zbarazh in 1649.

With the proliferation of field artillery, this kind of fortification fell into disuse. In a wider sense the Russian term has come to be applied to foreign mobile fortifications, such as wagon forts of Hussites.

Photographs exist of a similar device that was captured by German forces from the Russians in 1914, at the beginning of World War I.

== Design and tactics ==
Russian armies would construct a gulyay-gorod from large wall-sized prefabricated shields (with holes for guns) installed on wheels or sleds, as a development of the wagon-fort concept. The usage of installable shields instead of permanently armoured wagons cost less and allowed the assembly of more possible configurations. Gulyay-gorod provided the cavalry with a mobile and impregnable (for the Tatars) shelter. From there, the cavalry could launch surprise attacks. A common technique was fire ambush, when the pursuers were lured by a false retreat under fire from gulyay-gorod, as it was already in 1572.

== See also ==
- Battery-tower
- Wagon fort
- Mantlet
- Gorod
- Pike and shot

== Sources ==
- V. F. Shperk, "The History of Fortification" (В. Ф. Шперк, История фортификации) (1957) (in Russian)
