= Novi Grad =

Novi Grad (lit. 'new town' or 'new castle') may refer to the following places:

== Bosnia and Herzegovina ==
- Novi Grad, Odžak, a village near Odžak in the Federation of Bosnia and Herzegovina
- Novi Grad, Bosnia and Herzegovina, a town and municipality in Republika Srpska
- Novi Grad, Sarajevo, a municipality in the city of Sarajevo

== Croatia ==
- Novi grad, Osijek, a city district of Osijek
- Novi Grad, Brod-Posavina County, a village near Oprisavci

== Serbia ==
- Novi Grad, Zemun, an urban neighborhood of Belgrade

== Slovenia ==
- Novi Grad, Sevnica, a settlement in the Municipality of Sevnica

== See also ==
- Novigrad (disambiguation)
- Stari Grad (disambiguation)
- Gornji Grad (disambiguation)
- Donji Grad (disambiguation)
- Grad (toponymy)
- Novo Selo (disambiguation)
- Novo Naselje (disambiguation)
