= Novgorodsky (inhabited locality) =

Novgorodsky (Russian: Новгородский; masculine), Novgorodskaya (Новгородская; feminine), or Novgorodskoye (Новгородское; neuter) is the name of several rural localities in Russia:

- Novgorodsky (rural locality), a settlement in Pesochensky Rural Administrative Okrug of Karachevsky District in Bryansk Oblast; 53°13′N 35°1′E
- Novgorodskoye, Kaliningrad Oblast, a settlement in Dobrinsky Rural Okrug of Guryevsky District in Kaliningrad Oblast
- Novgorodskoye, Tula Oblast, a selo in Dvorikovsky Rural Okrug of Volovsky District in Tula Oblast
- Novgorodskoye, Bezhetsky District, Tver Oblast, a village in Sukromenskoye Rural Settlement of Bezhetsky District in Tver Oblast
- Novgorodskoye, Torzhoksky District, Tver Oblast, a village in Moshkovskoye Rural Settlement of Torzhoksky District in Tver Oblast
- Novgorodskoye, Vladimir Oblast, a selo in Suzdalsky District of Vladimir Oblast
- Novgorodskaya (rural locality), a village in Timoshinsky Selsoviet of Verkhnetoyemsky District in Arkhangelsk Oblast
