= Starigrad =

Starigrad ("Old Town") may refer to:

- Starigrad, Zadar County, a village and municipality near Zadar, Croatia
- Starigrad, Lika-Senj County, a village near Senj, Croatia
- Starigrad, Koprivnica-Križevci County, a village near Koprivnica, Croatia
- Starigrad Fortress, a fortress near Omiš, Croatia
- Stari Grad, Croatia, a town on the northern side of the island of Hvar in Dalmatia, Croatia

== See also ==
- Stalingrad (disambiguation)
- Stari grad (disambiguation)
- Novigrad (disambiguation)
- Grad (toponymy)
