= Nowogród (disambiguation) =

Nowogród ("New Town") may refer to the following places:

- Nowogród in Podlaskie Voivodeship (north-east Poland)
- Nowogród Bobrzański, a town in Zielona Góra County, Lubusz Voivodeship, Poland
- Nowogród, Gmina Zbójna, a village in the administrative district of Gmina Zbójna, within Łomża County, Podlaskie Voivodeship, Poland
- Nowogród, Kuyavian-Pomeranian Voivodeship, a village in the administrative district of Gmina Golub-Dobrzyń, within Golub-Dobrzyń County, Kuyavian-Pomeranian Voivodeship, Poland
- Nowogród, Lublin Voivodeship, a village in the administrative district of Gmina Łęczna, within Łęczna County, Lublin Voivodeship, Poland
- Gmina Nowogród Bobrzański, an urban-rural gmina in Zielona Góra County, Lubusz Voivodeship, Poland
- Gmina Nowogród, an urban-rural gmina in Łomża County, Podlaskie Voivodeship, Poland
- Novhorod-Siversky, a historic city in the Chernihiv Oblast (province) of Ukraine

== See also ==
- Novgorod (disambiguation)
- Novigrad (disambiguation)
