= Donji grad =

Donji grad ("Lower Town") may refer to:

- Donji grad, Zagreb, Croatia
- Donji grad, Osijek, Croatia
- Donji Grad, Zemun, Serbia

== See also ==
- Gornji Grad (disambiguation)
- Stari Grad (disambiguation)
- Novi Grad (disambiguation)
- Grad (toponymy)
