= Stari Grad =

Stari Grad ("Old Town") may refer to:

== Bosnia and Herzegovina ==
- Stari Grad, Sarajevo, a municipality in Sarajevo

== Croatia ==
- Stari Grad, Croatia, a town on the island of Hvar
- Stari Grad, Šibenik, an administrative division of the city of Šibenik

== Montenegro ==
- Stari grad, Cetinje, a section of Old Royal Capital Cetinje
- Stara Varoš, Podgorica, former neighborhood in Podgorica

== North Macedonia ==
- Stari Grad, Čaška, a village in municipality of Čaška

== Serbia ==
- Stari Grad, Belgrade, a municipality in Belgrade
- Stari Grad, Novi Sad, a neighborhood in Novi Sad
- Stari Grad, Užice, the remains of a fort in Užice
- Stari Grad, Kragujevac, former city municipality of Kragujevac

== Slovenia ==
- Ortnek Castle, in the municipality of Ribnica
- Stari Grad, Makole

== See also ==
- Starigrad (disambiguation)
- Novi Grad (disambiguation)
- Gornji Grad (disambiguation)
- Donji Grad (disambiguation)
- Grad (toponymy)
- Staro Selo (disambiguation)
