= City of republic significance =

City of republic significance (or importance) is a type of an administrative division in some countries of the former Soviet Union.

- in Kazakhstan; see city of republican significance
- in Russia; see city of federal subject significance
- in Ukraine; see city with special status

In Latvia, State cities were called Republican cities from 1990 to 2021.
