= Gradina, Velika Kladuša =

Gradina
- Village
- Location within Bosnia and Herzegovina
- Coordinates: 45.171186°N 16.023395°E
- Country: Bosnia and Herzegovina
- Entity: Federation of Bosnia and Herzegovina
- Canton: Una-Sana
- Municipality: Velika Kladuša

Area
  - Total: 5.52 sq mi (14.30 km^{2})

Population (2013)
  - Total: 352
  - Density: 63.8/sq mi (24.6/km^{2})
- Time zone: UTC+1 (CET)
  - Summer (DST): UTC+2 (CEST)

Gradina is a village in the municipality of Velika Kladuša, Bosnia and Herzegovina.

== Demographics ==
According to the 2013 census, its population was 352.

Ethnicity in 2013
Ethnicity	Number	Percentage
Bosniaks	298	84.7%
Serbs	27	7.7%
other/undeclared	27	7.7%
Total	352	100%
