= Podgora pri Zlatem Polju =

- Village
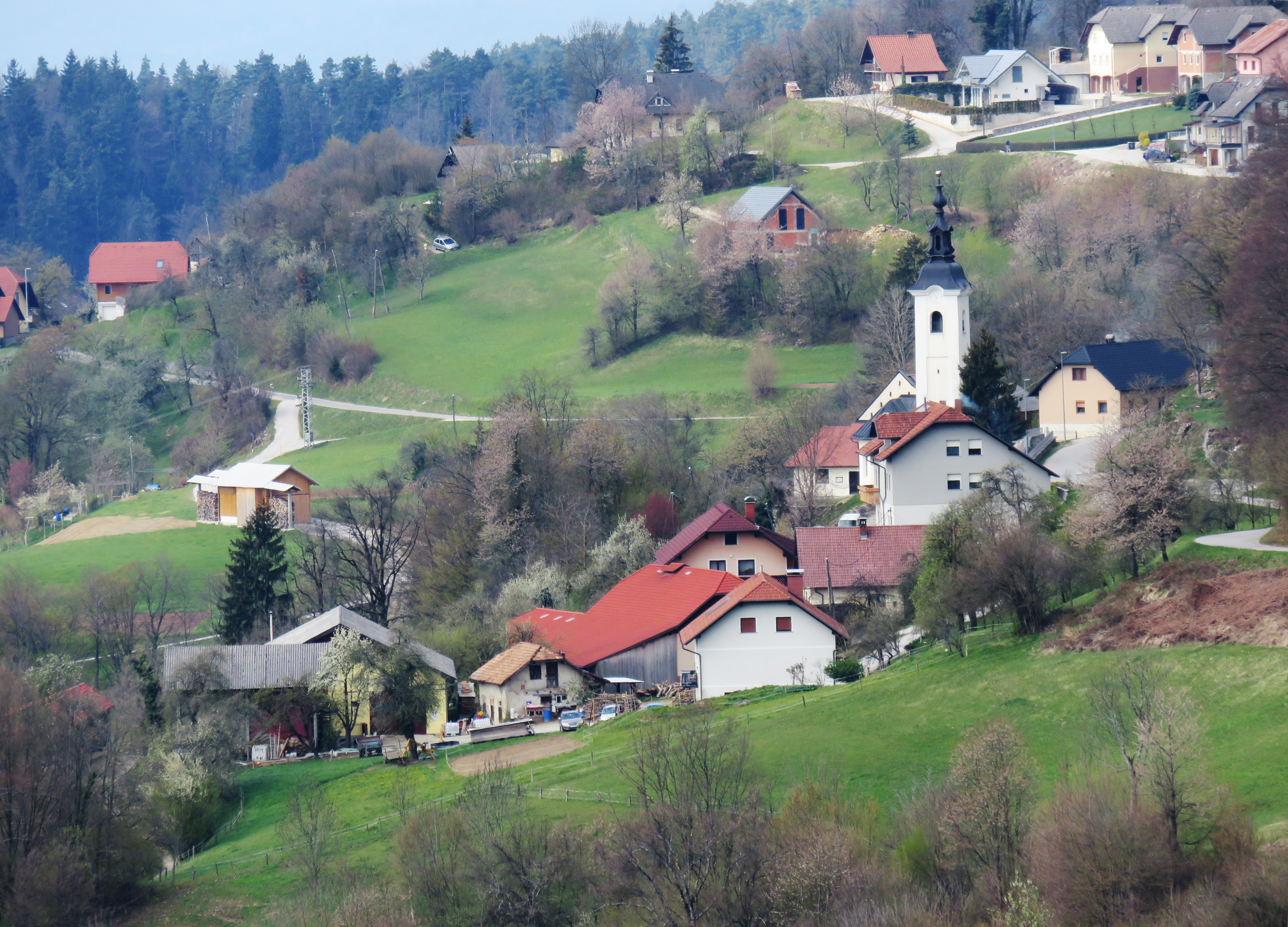

- Location in Slovenia
- Coordinates: 46°11′34.86″N 14°43′11.62″E
- Country: Slovenia
- Traditional region: Upper Carniola
- Statistical region: Central Slovenia
- Municipality: Lukovica

Area
  - Total: 0.34 km^{2} (0.13 sq mi)
- Elevation: 555.4 m (1,822 ft)

Population (2002)
  - Total: 22

Podgora pri Zlatem Polju (pronounced [pɔdˈɡɔːɾa pɾi ˈzlaːtɛm ˈpoːlju]) is a small settlement in the hills northeast of Lukovica pri Domžalah in the eastern part of the Upper Carniola region of Slovenia.

== Name ==
The name of the settlement was changed from Podgora to Podgora pri Zlatem Polju in 1955.

== Church ==
The Zlato Polje parish church in the settlement is dedicated to Mary Magdalene.
