= Grodzisko =

Location of places called Grodzisko in Poland

In Polish, grodzisko means a mound or ring of earth remaining on the site of a former gord (gród), or fortified settlement.

Grodzisko may also refer to any of the following places:

- Grodzisko, Gołdap County in Warmian-Masurian Voivodeship (north Poland)
- Grodzisko, Gostyń County in Greater Poland Voivodeship (west-central Poland)
- Grodzisko, Kartuzy County in Pomeranian Voivodeship (north Poland)
- Grodzisko, Kędzierzyn-Koźle County in Opole Voivodeship (south-west Poland)
- Grodzisko, Łęczyca County in Łódź Voivodeship (central Poland)
- Grodzisko, Lesser Poland Voivodeship (south Poland)
- Grodzisko, Leszno County in Greater Poland Voivodeship (west-central Poland)
- Grodzisko, Łódź East County in Łódź Voivodeship (central Poland)
- Grodzisko, Masovian Voivodeship (east-central Poland)
- Grodzisko, Olesno County in Opole Voivodeship (south-west Poland)
- Grodzisko, Pisz County in Warmian-Masurian Voivodeship (north Poland)
- Grodzisko, Pleszew County in Greater Poland Voivodeship (west-central Poland)
- Grodzisko, Podkarpackie Voivodeship (south-east Poland)
- Grodzisko, Podlaskie Voivodeship (north-east Poland)
- Grodzisko, Pomeranian Voivodeship (north Poland)
- Grodzisko, Radomsko County in Łódź Voivodeship (central Poland)
- Grodzisko, Silesian Voivodeship (south Poland)
- Grodzisko, Strzelce County in Opole Voivodeship (south-west Poland)
- Grodzisko, Świętokrzyskie Voivodeship (south-central Poland)

== See also ==
- Grodzisk (disambiguation)
