= Dimitrovgrad =

Dimitrovgrad (Cyrillic: Димитровград) is the name of three localities in Europe, all named after Georgi Dimitrov:

- Dimitrovgrad, Bulgaria
- Dimitrovgrad, Russia
- Dimitrovgrad, Serbia (also known as Caribrod)
