= Gradinje =

Gradinje may refer to:

== Croatia ==
- Gradinje, Cerovlje, settlement in the Municipality of Cerovlje
- Gradinje, Oprtalj, settlement in the Municipality of Oprtalj

== Serbia ==
- Gradinje, Serbia, settlement in the Municipality of Dimitrovgrad

== Slovenia ==
- Gradnje, Krško, settlement in the Municipality of Krško (known as Gradinje until 1990)

== See also ==
- Gradina (disambiguation)
