= Stalingrad (disambiguation) =

Stalingrad is a former name of Volgograd, a city in Russia.

Stalingrad may also refer to:

== Related to the city ==
- Battle of Stalingrad, a battle in 1942–1943 widely considered the turning point in the European theatre of World War II
- Stalingrad Oblast, former name of Volgograd Oblast, an administrative division of Russia

== Arts and entertainment ==
=== Films ===
(All set in the Battle of Stalingrad)

- Stalingrad (1943 film), a Soviet documentary film
- Stalingrad: Dogs, Do You Want to Live Forever?, a 1959 West German film
- Stalingrad (1990 film), a Soviet-American film
- Stalingrad (1993 film), a German film
- Stalingrad (2013 film), a Russian film

=== Music ===
- Stalingrad, a 1988 album by Eternal Flame
- "Stalingrad", a song by Swedish metal band Sabaton from the 2005 album Primo Victoria
- "Stalingrad", a song by Russian-sung Finnish metal band KYPCK from the 2008 album Cherno
- Stalingrad (Accept album) (2012)

=== Other ===
- Stalingrad, a 1948 novel by Theodor Plievier, and two television adaptations
- Stalingrad (Grossman novel), a 1952 novel by Vasily Grossman
- Stalingrad (wargame), a 1963 tabletop wargame by Avalon Hill
- Stalingrad (painting), a 1972 oil painting by Danish artist Asger Jorn
- Stalingrad (Beevor book), a non-fiction book by Antony Beevor published in 1998
- Stalingrad (2005 video game), a real-time strategy computer game

== Other uses ==
- SS Stalingrad, a 1933 Soviet steamship active in the World War II Arctic convoys, and sunk in 1942
- Stalingrad-class battlecruiser, a cancelled Soviet dreadnought warship
- Stalingrad station (Paris Metro), a metro station in Paris, France
- Place de la Bataille-de-Stalingrad, a square in Paris named after the battle
- Stalingrad legal defense, a strategy used by a defendant to wear down the plaintiff or legal proceedings
- 2250 Stalingrad, an asteroid discovered in 1972 by Tamara Smirnova

== See also ==
- Starigrad (disambiguation)
