= Grodzisk =

Location of places called Grodzisk in Poland

Grodzisk may refer to any of the following places:

- Grodzisk, Greater Poland Voivodeship (west-central Poland)
- Grodzisk, Łódź Voivodeship (central Poland)
- Grodzisk, Lubusz Voivodeship (west Poland)
- Grodzisk, Mińsk County, Masovian Voivodeship (east-central Poland)
- Grodzisk, Ostrołęka County, Masovian Voivodeship (east-central Poland)
- Grodzisk, Siedlce County, Masovian Voivodeship (east-central Poland)
- Grodzisk, Sokołów County, Masovian Voivodeship (east-central Poland)
- Grodzisk, Węgrów County, Masovian Voivodeship (east-central Poland)
- Grodzisk, Hajnówka County, Podlaskie Voivodeship (north-east Poland)
- Grodzisk, Siemiatycze County, Podlaskie Voivodeship (north-east Poland)
- Grodzisk, Sokółka County, Podlaskie Voivodeship (north-east Poland)
- Grodzisk Mazowiecki, Masovian Voivodeship (east-central Poland)
- Grodzisk Wielkopolski, Greater Poland Voivodeship (west-central Poland)

== See also ==
- Dyskobolia Grodzisk Wielkopolski, a football club
- Grodzhisk, Hasidic dynasty
- Grodzisk Goblins, a fictional sports club in the Harry Potter universe
- Grodziskie, a beer style
- Grodzisko (disambiguation)
