= Gradina, Travnik =

Gradina
- Village
- Location within Bosnia and Herzegovina
- Coordinates: 44.2541578°N 17.4637805°E
- Country: Bosnia and Herzegovina
- Entity: Federation of Bosnia and Herzegovina
- Canton: Central Bosnia
- Municipality: Travnik

Area
  - Total: 3.63 sq mi (9.40 km^{2})

Population (2013)
  - Total: 383
  - Density: 106/sq mi (40.7/km^{2})
- Time zone: UTC+1 (CET)
  - Summer (DST): UTC+2 (CEST)

Gradina is a village in the municipality of Travnik, Bosnia and Herzegovina.

== Demographics ==
According to the 2013 census, its population was 383.

Ethnicity in 2013
Ethnicity	Number	Percentage
Bosniaks	377	98.4%
other/undeclared	6	1.6%
Total	383	100%
