= Erčege =

- Village
- Location within Serbia
- Coordinates: 43°22′34″N 20°09′14″E
- Country: Serbia
- District: Moravica District
- Municipality: Ivanjica

Area
  - Total: 27.56 km^{2} (10.64 sq mi)

Population (2011)
  - Total: 149
  - Density: 5.41/km^{2} (14.0/sq mi)
- Time zone: UTC+1 (CET)
  - Summer (DST): UTC+2 (CEST)

Erčege is a village in the municipality of Ivanjica, Serbia. According to the 2011 census, the village has a population of 149 inhabitants.
