= Battle of Lubny =

Battle during Nalyvaiko Uprising

- Part of the Nalyvaiko Uprising
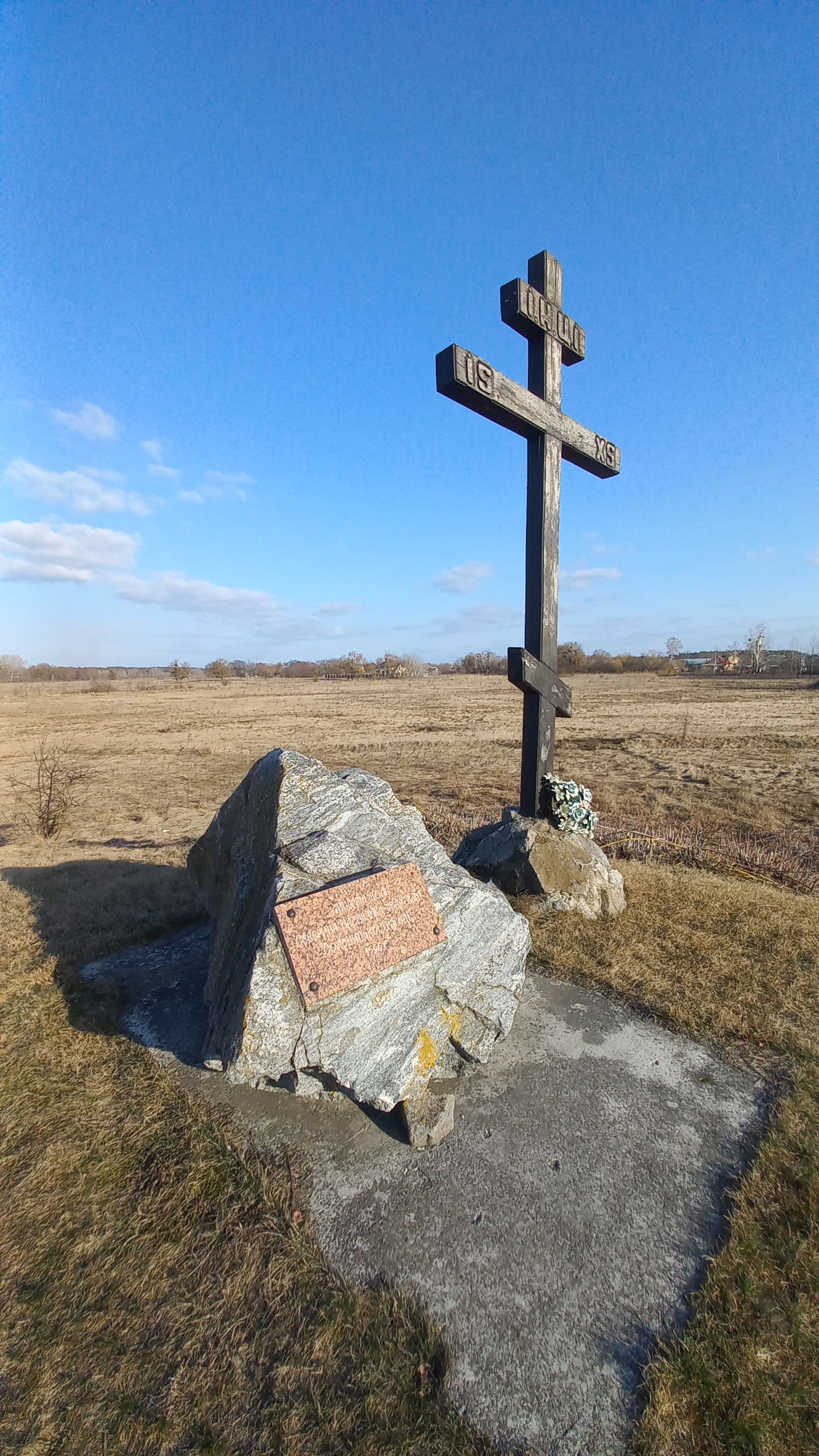
Date	26 May – 7 June, 1596
Location	Lubny, Kyiv Voivodeship, Polish–Lithuanian Commonwealth
Result	Polish–Lithuanian victory

Belligerents
Polish–Lithuanian Commonwealth	Zaporozhian Cossacks

Commanders and leaders
Stanisław Żółkiewski	Severyn Nalyvaiko (POW); Hryhoriy Loboda †

Strength
5,000	6,000; 30 cannons

Casualties and losses
Unknown	4,500–5,000 killed and wounded (1,000–1,500 murdered prisoners)

The Battle of Lubny (Note: (Polish: Bitwa pod Łubinami, Ukrainian:Солоницький бій,) (Battle of Solonytsia)) - battle fought between insurgent Cossacks and Polish troops from 26 May to 7 June 1596 during the Nalyvaiko Uprising.

== Battle ==
The battle took place on the Sulava River near the villages of Lubny and Sołonica. There, the insurgents led by Severyn Nalyvaiko and Hryhorii Loboda decided to defend themselves based on the river. The attacking side was the army commanded by Hetman Stanisław Żółkiewski. They numbered around 5,000 soldiers. The Cossack troops took up defensive positions, even though they numbered around 6,000 men, as there were many wounded and sick among them.

The besieged were suffering heavy losses from the crown's artillery. There was a shortage of food and water in the camp, and there had been a large number of horse deaths. In addition, the disagreements between the registered Cossacks and the non-registered Cossacks were escalating. Taking advantage of the insurgents' plight, Stanisław Żółkiewski entered into secret negotiations with Hryhorii Loboda. He promised amnesty to the registered Cossacks. The rumours of surrender led to an armed clash between registered and unregistered Cossacks, in which Loboda was killed.

On the 26th of May 1596, the Polish nobility fired cannons into the camp in preparation for a decisive attack. Severyn Nalyvaiyko, the wounded Matvei Shaula and other leaders of the uprising were treacherously captured by the head of the "registrars" on the night of 28 May and handed over to Żółkiewski. After negotiating, it was agreed that they would surrender their leaders, weapons and ammunition, and return looted property and prisoners. However, a massacre took place when the rebels left the camp. Despite the orders of the Hetman, between 1000 and 1500 prisoners died. The Solonytsia massacre contributed to increasing hatred and destroyed the chances of reaching an agreement with the Cossacks and the people of Ukraine, setting a notorious precedent of treaty-breaking. Later, in Warsaw, Severyn Nalyvaiko was executed.

== Interesting fact ==
The first mention of the term "Ukrainians" is connected with the massacre of Cossacks and their families after the battle of Solonitsa. It is used by Żółkiewski in his report to the king as a name for the Polish bailiffs who massacred the Cossacks.
