= Gradina, Danilovgrad =

Gradina Градина
- Village
- Location within Montenegro
- Coordinates: 42.539010°N 19.205865°E
- Country: Montenegro
- Municipality: Danilovgrad

Population (2011)
  - Total: 187
- Time zone: UTC+1 (CET)
  - Summer (DST): UTC+2 (CEST)

Gradina (Serbian Cyrillic: Градина) is a village in the municipality of Danilovgrad, Montenegro.

== Demographics ==
According to the 2011 census, its population was 187.

Ethnicity in 2011
Ethnicity	Number	Percentage
Montenegrins	116	62.0%
Serbs	61	32.6%
other/undeclared	10	5.3%
Total	187	100%
