= Podgora, Lopare =

Podgora
- Village
- Location within Bosnia and Herzegovina
- Coordinates: 44.5552437°N 18.8488879°E
- Country: Bosnia and Herzegovina
- Entity: Republika Srpska; Federation of Bosnia and Herzegovina
- Region Canton: Bijeljina; Tuzla
- Municipality: Lopare; Sapna

Area
  - Total: 6.21 sq mi (16.08 km^{2})

Population (2013)
  - Total: 231
  - Density: 37.2/sq mi (14.4/km^{2})
- Time zone: UTC+1 (CET)
  - Summer (DST): UTC+2 (CEST)

Podgora is a village in the municipalities of Lopare (Republika Srpska) and Sapna, Tuzla Canton, Bosnia and Herzegovina.

== Demographics ==
According to the 2013 census, its population was 231, all living in the Lopare part, thus none in Sapna.

Ethnicity in 2013
Ethnicity	Number	Percentage
Serbs	230	99.6%
Croats	1	0.4%
Total	231	100%
