= Local development =

Theory in social sciences

Local development is a relatively young theory in social sciences based on the identification and use of the resources and endogenous potentialities of a community, neighbourhood, city, municipality or equivalent.

The local development approach considers the endogenous potentialities of territories. Economic and non economic factors influence local development processes. Among the non economic factors, social, cultural, historical, institutional, and geographical aspects can be decisive in the process of local economic development.

== Definition ==
In this perspective, local economic development can be defined as a process of transformation of the local economy and society, oriented to surpass the difficulties and existent challenges. It seeks to improve the conditions of life of local population by means of actions concerted between the different local agents, social, public and private, towards an efficient and sustainable use of the existent endogenous resources. In this approach, the importance of social capital and the links of cooperation with external agents to capture human, monetary and technical resources contribute to the local development strategy.

== Examples ==
There exist many international institutions (Foundation Dag Hammarskjöld, FLACSO-Academic Headquarters Guatemala and Costa Rica, the Centre for Local Development of the OCDE) and other of national character in different countries devoted to improve the conditions of life of local spaces by means of this approach of development. Among some authors whose work influences this approach can be found Manfred Max-Neef. His texts "The barefoot economy" and "Development to scale Human" are a good example of this.

== See also ==
- Very common (political Economy)
- Community
- Economic development
- Rural development
- Localism (politics)
- Local development plan
