= Gradina, Zenica =

Gradina Градина
- Village
- Location within Bosnia and Herzegovina
- Coordinates: 44°14′23″N 18°3′26″E
- Country: Bosnia and Herzegovina
- Entity: Federation of Bosnia and Herzegovina
- Canton: Zenica-Doboj
- Municipality: Zenica

Area
  - Total: 0.52 sq mi (1.35 km^{2})

Population (2013)
  - Total: 85
  - Density: 160/sq mi (63/km^{2})
- Time zone: UTC+1 (CET)
  - Summer (DST): UTC+2 (CEST)

Gradina (Cyrillic: Градина) is a village in the City of Zenica, Bosnia and Herzegovina.

== Demographics ==
According to the 2013 census, its population was 85, all Bosniaks.
