= Radaljevo =

- Village
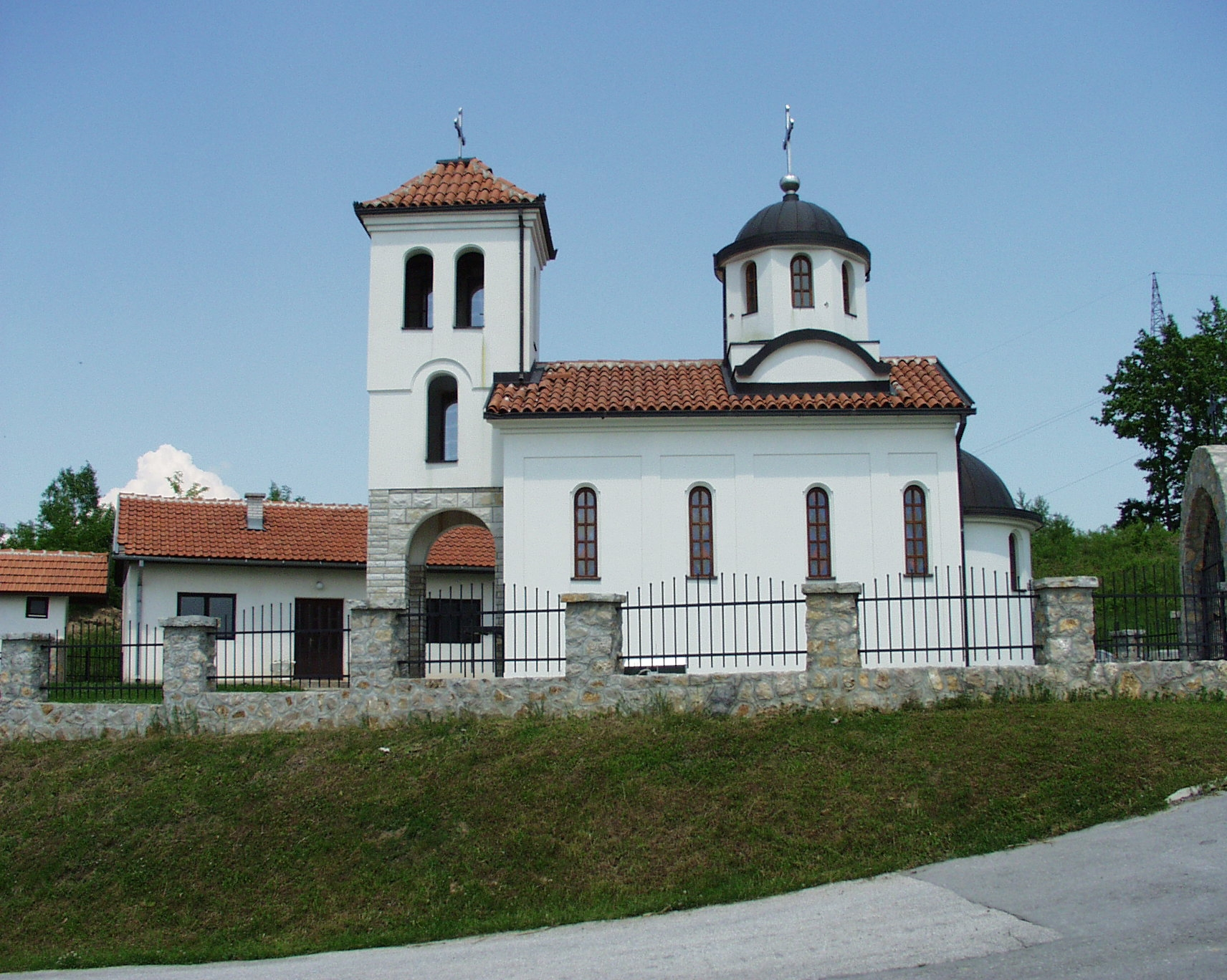

- Location within Serbia
- Coordinates: 43°39′N 20°09′E
- Country: Serbia
- District: Moravica District
- Municipality: Ivanjica

Area
  - Total: 15.11 km^{2} (5.83 sq mi)

Population (2011)
  - Total: 904
  - Density: 59.8/km^{2} (155/sq mi)
- Time zone: UTC+1 (CET)
  - Summer (DST): UTC+2 (CEST)

Radaljevo is a village in the municipality of Ivanjica, Serbia. According to the 2011 census, the village has a population of 904 inhabitants.
