= Hryhoriy Loboda =

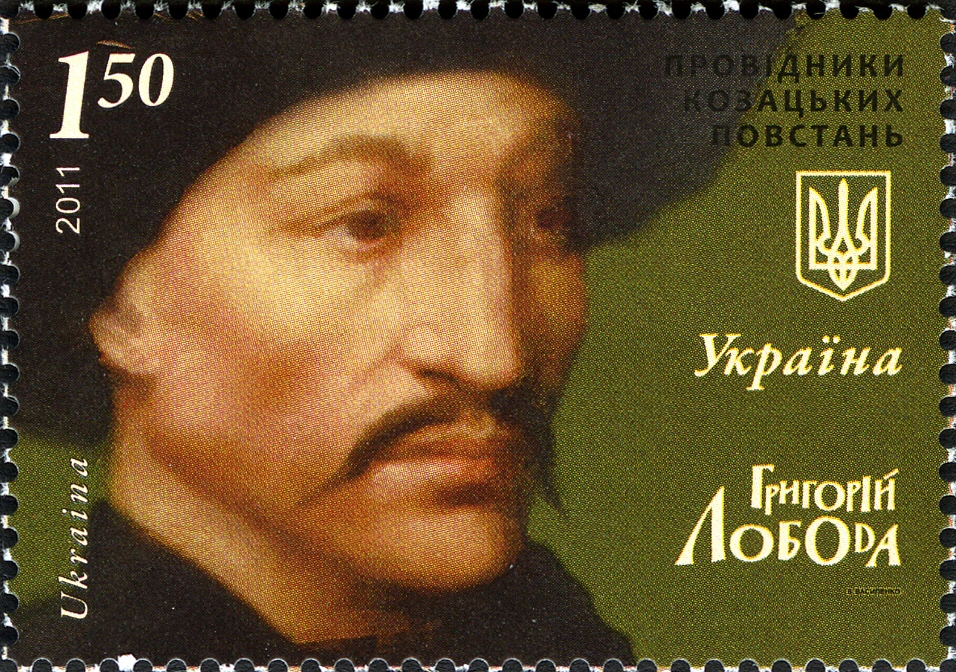
Ukrainian stamp (2011)

Hryhorii Loboda (Ukrainian: Григорій Лобода, romanized: Hryhorii Loboda, Romanian: Grigore Lobodă, Polish: Grzegorz Łoboda; born in the Kyiv region — May 1596), was a hetman of the Registered Cossacks (1593). In 1594 and 1595 he and Severyn Nalyvaiko took part in the anti-Turkish campaign in Moldavia as allies of Rudolf II. During the Cossack rebellion of 1596, Loboda and Nalyvaiko raided the Kyiv Voivodeship neighboring territory which is now Belarus. Loboda was assassinated by Nalyvaiko's supporters during the Battle of Solonytsia, under suspicion of attempting to come to terms with Stanisław Żółkiewski, crown hetman of the Poles.
