= Novgorodskoye, Vladimir Oblast =

Novgorodskoye Новгородское
- Selo
- Location within Vladimir Oblast Location within Russia
- Coordinates: 56°14′N 40°18′E
- Country: Russia
- Region: Vladimir Oblast
- District: Suzdalsky District
- Time zone: UTC+3:00

Novgorodskoye (Russian: Новгородское) is a rural locality (a selo) in Novoalexandrovskoye Rural Settlement, Suzdalsky District, Vladimir Oblast, Russia. The population was 23 as of 2010. There are 3 streets.

== Geography ==
Novgorodskoye is located 39 km southwest of Suzdal (the district's administrative centre) by road. Khotenskoye is the nearest rural locality.
