= Lisa, Ivanjica =

Lisa
- Village
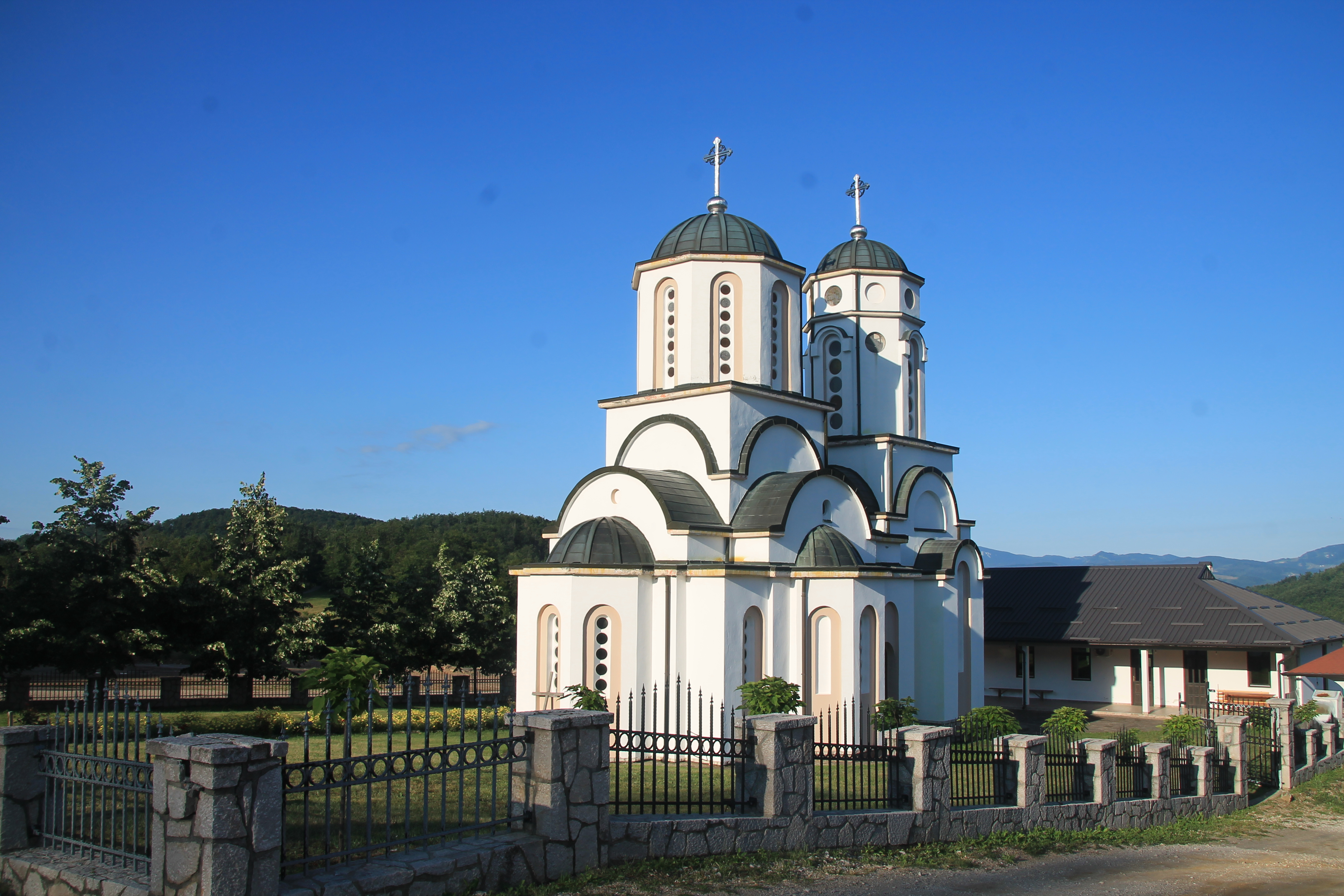
- Lisa kod Ivanjice

- Location within Serbia
- Coordinates: 43°37′22″N 20°11′18″E
- Country: Serbia
- District: Moravica District
- Municipality: Ivanjica

Area
  - Total: 38.13 km^{2} (14.72 sq mi)

Population (2011)
  - Total: 943
  - Density: 24.7/km^{2} (64.1/sq mi)
- Time zone: UTC+1 (CET)
  - Summer (DST): UTC+2 (CEST)

Lisa is a village in the municipality of Ivanjica, Serbia. According to the 2011 census, the village has a population of 943 inhabitants.
