= Gradina, Šibenik-Knin County =

Settlement in Šibenik-Knin County, Croatia

Gradina
- Settlement
- Interactive map of Gradina
- Location of Gradina in Croatia
- Coordinates: 43.77186°N 15.96791°E
- Country: Croatia
- County: Šibenik-Knin
- City: Šibenik

Area
  - Total: 20.1 km^{2} (7.8 sq mi)

Population (2021)
  - Total: 258
  - Density: 12.8/km^{2} (33.2/sq mi)
- Time zone: UTC+1 (CET)
  - Summer (DST): UTC+2 (CEST)
- Postal code: 22000 Šibenik
- Area code: +385 (0)22

Gradina is a settlement in the City of Šibenik in Croatia. In 2021, its population was 258.

== Demographics ==
Gradina: Population trends 1857–2021
v

population			230	382	419	483	508	588	601	608	574	511	403	393	333	303	258
	1857	1869	1880	1890	1900	1910	1921	1931	1948	1953	1961	1971	1981	1991	2001	2011	2021

Sources: Croatian Bureau of Statistics publications
