= Podgora, Dobrepolje =

Podgora
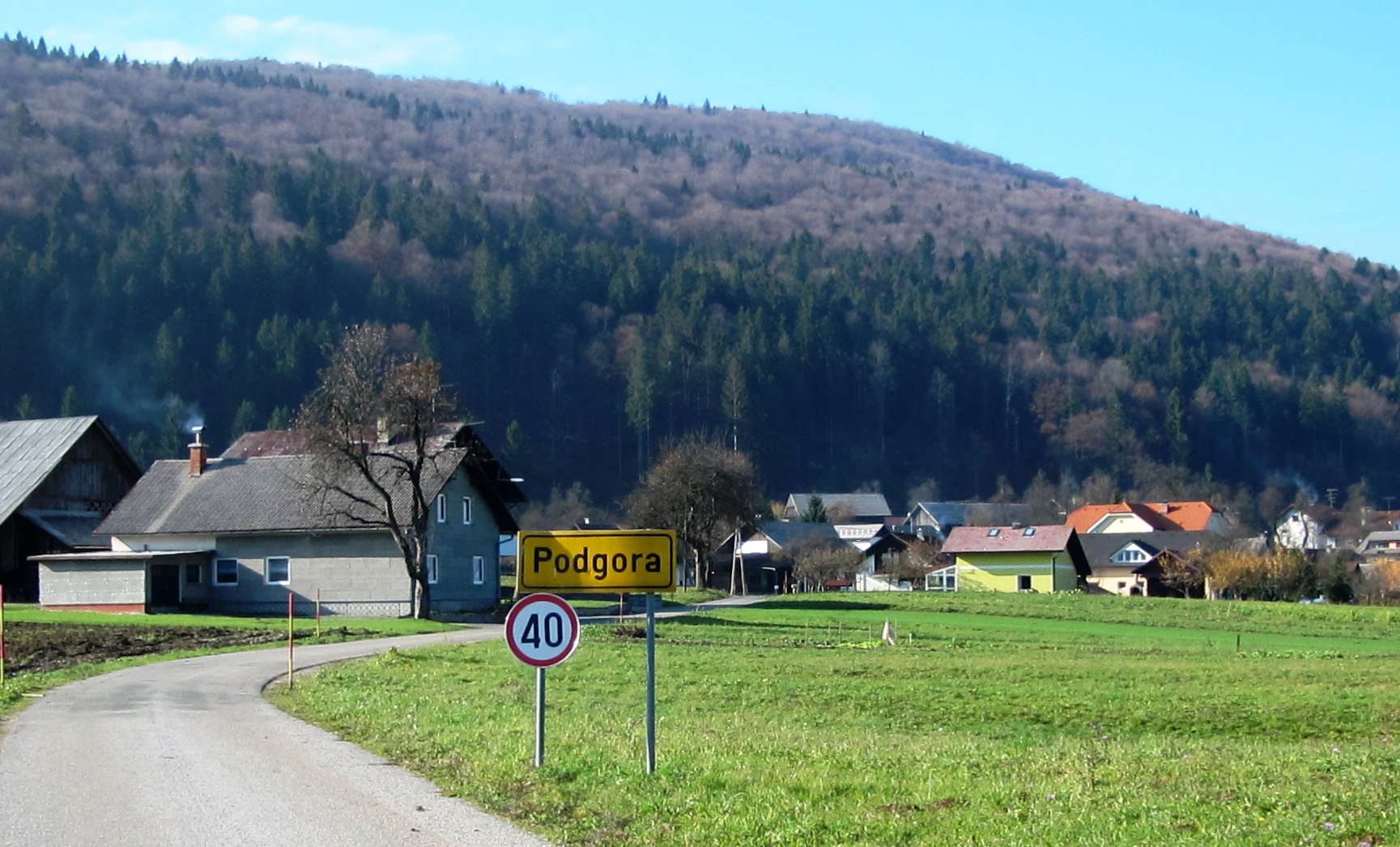

- Location in Slovenia
- Coordinates: 45°49′36.35″N 14°42′8.25″E
- Country: Slovenia
- Traditional region: Lower Carniola
- Statistical region: Central Slovenia
- Municipality: Dobrepolje

Area
  - Total: 3.35 km^{2} (1.29 sq mi)
- Elevation: 438.9 m (1,440 ft)

Population (2020)
  - Total: 114
  - Density: 34.0/km^{2} (88.1/sq mi)

Podgora (pronounced [pɔdˈɡɔːɾa]) is a village in the Municipality of Dobrepolje in Slovenia. The area is part of the historical region of Lower Carniola. The municipality is now included in the Central Slovenia Statistical Region.

== Geography ==
Podgora is located in the northern part of the Dobrepolje karst polje. It lies in a transitional position between the edge of the polje and the steep slopes of the Little Mountains (Slovene: Mala gora) chain, with inclines up to 29.5°. It is the only village in the polje located almost entirely on Triassic rock. A major Dinaric fault runs past Podgora. The area is rich in springs, with five in Podgora alone. The largest and best-known spring is Žovkno Spring. The other springs are Beč and Zajščica springs in the village itself, nearby Pri Koritu Spring, and Puhovka Spring in Puh Cave (Slovene: Puhova jama) just below the top of Grmada Hill (887 m).

== History ==
During the Second World War, there were several engagements near the village between Italian troops and Partisan forces in 1942. Italian troops burned a number of farms in the village. On the night of 16 June 1945, eight civilians from the village were murdered and buried in the Mala Vas Mass Grave in neighboring Mala Vas. On 21 October 1968 there was a major fire in the village, causing extensive destruction.

== Church ==
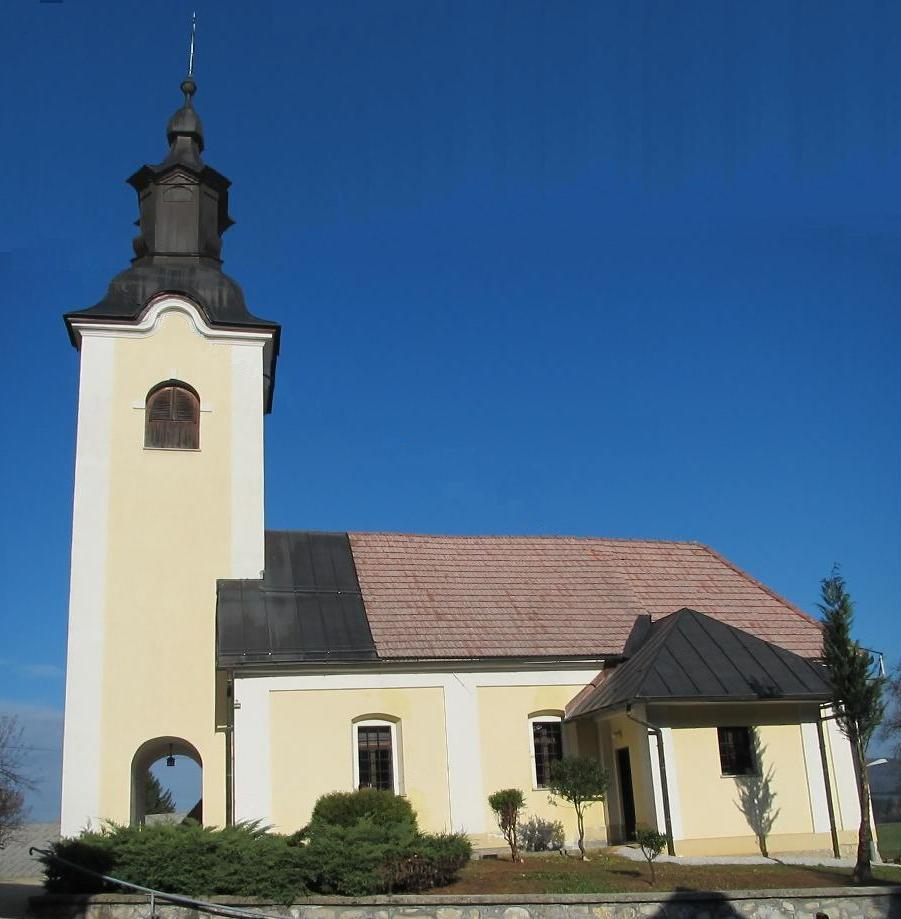
Saint Nicholas' Church

The local church is dedicated to Saint Nicholas and belongs to the Parish of Dobrepolje–Videm. It was first mentioned in written sources in 1526.
