= Horod =

Slavic word meaning town or castle

Horod (Cyrillic: город) from Old Slavonic gord is a version of the Slavic word meaning "town", "city" or "castle", also found in Slavic languages as grad or gorod.

It is mostly found in Czech, Slovak, Belarusian and Ukrainian, which, unlike the other Slavic languages, do not use hard 'g' except in loanwords.

Horod is preserved in the toponymy of numerous Slavic placenames:

- Uzhhorod
- Vyshhorod
- Horodok
- Horodyshche
- Myrhorod
- Novomyrhorod
- Bilhorod-Dnistrovskyi
- Horodyshche
- Horodenka
- Sharhorod
- Bilohorodka
- Hradyzk, formerly Horodyshche
- Novhorod-Siverskyi
- Zvenyhorod
- Zvenyhorodka
