= Mestechko =

Mestechko (Russian: местечко; Ukrainian: містечко, romanized: mistechko; Polish: miasteczko) may refer to:

- a place located within Pale of Settlement in the Russian Empire with predominantly Jewish population; see shtetl
- the russifed form of the term "miasteczko"
- a rural locality type in modern Russia
- Mestečko, a town in Slovakia

== See also ==
- Mestecko
