= Mestečko =

- Municipality
- Flag

- Location of Mestečko in the Trenčín Region Location of Mestečko in Slovakia
- Coordinates: 49.17°N 18.26°E
- Country: Slovakia
- Region: Trenčín Region
- District: Púchov District
- First mentioned: 1471

Area
  - Total: 5.42 km^{2} (2.09 sq mi)
- Elevation: 321 m (1,053 ft)

Population (2025)
  - Total: 485
- Time zone: UTC+1 (CET)
  - Summer (DST): UTC+2 (CEST)
- Postal code: 205 2
- Area code: +421 42
- Vehicle registration plate (until 2022): PU
- Website: www.obecmestecko.sk

Mestečko (Hungarian: Lednickisfalu) is a village and municipality in Púchov District in the Trenčín Region of north-western Slovakia.

== History ==
In historical records the village was first mentioned in 1471.

== Geography ==
The municipality lies at an altitude of 321 metres (1,053 ft) and covers an area of 5.42 km^{2} (2.09 sq mi) (2025).

== Population ==
Population statistic (10 years)
Year	1995	2005	2015	2025
Count	513	507	524	485
Difference		−1.16%	+3.35%	−7.44%

Population statistic
Year	2024	2025
Count	488	485
Difference		−0.61%

It has a population of 485 people (31 December 2025).

=== Ethnicity ===
Census 2021 (1+ %)
Ethnicity	Number	Fraction
Slovak	511	97.7%
Not found out	9	1.72%
Total	523	

In year 2021 was 523 people by ethnicity 511 as Slovak, 9 as Not found out, 3 as Other, 2 as Hungarian, 2 as Canadian, 1 as Czech, 1 as Polish and 1 as Moravian.

Note on population: The difference values of population numbers in the table "Population statistic" and in the sections "Ethnicity" & "Religion" is caused by the use of various statistical methods.

=== Religion ===
Census 2021 (1+ %)
Religion	Number	Fraction
Evangelical Church	331	63.29%
Roman Catholic Church	149	28.49%
None	27	5.16%
Not found out	8	1.53%
Total	523	

In year 2021 was 523 people by religion 331 from Evangelical Church, 149 from Roman Catholic Church, 27 from None, 8 from Not found out, 4 from Seventh-day Adventist Church, 1 from Other and not ascertained christian church, 1 from Jehovah's Witnesses, 1 from Church of the Brethren and 1 from Baptists Church.
