= Novgorod (disambiguation) =

Veliky Novgorod is a city in Russia, commonly referred to as simply Novgorod.

Novgorod (Russian for new town or new city) may also refer to:

== Places related to Veliky Novgorod ==
- Novgorod Oblast, a federal subject of Russia
- Novgorod Airport, an airport in the city of Veliky Novgorod
- Novgorod Republic, a medieval Russian state between the 12th and 15th centuries with Veliky Novgorod as capital

== Other places ==
- Nizhny Novgorod, a city in Russia, located in Nizhny Novgorod Oblast
- Novhorod-Siverskyi, a city in Ukraine

== Other uses ==
- Novgorod (newspaper), a Russian newspaper
- Russian monitor Novgorod, a circular vessel laid down in 1871
- Novgorod case, the conventional term used in the Russian blogosphere and mass media for the controversial criminal case
- Novgorod Codex, the oldest book of Kievan Rus'
- 3799 Novgorod, a minor planet
- Old Novgorod dialect

== See also ==
- Novgorodsky (disambiguation)
