= Gorod (toponymy) =

Slavic word

Gorod (Cyrillic: город) is a version of the Slavic word meaning "town", "city" or "castle", and is related to the similar grad and horod.

It is preserved in the toponymy of numerous Slavic places:

- Bely Gorod
- Belgorod
- Gorodets (with -ets as the suffix of diminutiveness)
- Gorodishche (with -ishche as the suffix of augmentation)
- Ivangorod
- Kitai-gorod
- Kitay-Gorod (Metro), cross-platform transfer point of the Moscow Metro
- Slavgorod
- Nizhny Novgorod
- Veliky Novgorod
- Zvenigorod

== See also ==
- Gord (archaeology)
