= Logarska Dolina =

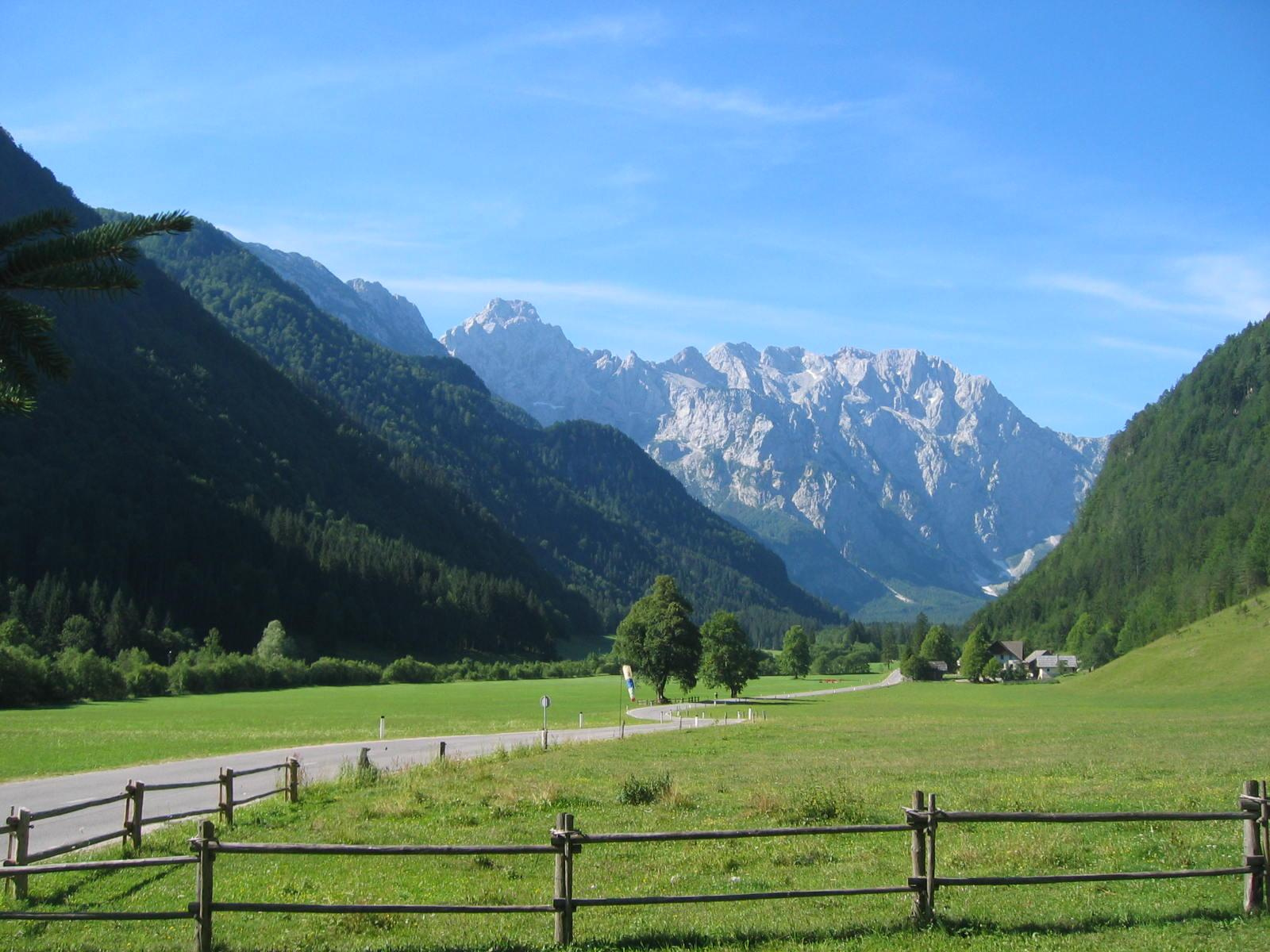

- Location in Slovenia
- Coordinates: 46°23′54.72″N 14°37′50.92″E
- Country: Slovenia
- Traditional region: Styria
- Statistical region: Savinja
- Municipality: Solčava

Area
  - Total: 44.21 km^{2} (17.07 sq mi)
- Elevation: 759.6 m (2,492 ft)

Population (2002)
  - Total: 95

Logarska Dolina (pronounced [ˈloːɡaɾska dɔˈliːna]) is a settlement in the Logar Valley in the Municipality of Solčava in northern Slovenia. The area belongs to the traditional region of Styria and is now included in the Savinja Statistical Region. 113 people lived in the settlement in 2020. The village is protected as an immovable cultural monument of local significance.

The village is notable for its Rinka Falls, which is the source of the Savinja River, one of the main rivers of Slovenia. The valley where the village stands is surrounded by two-thousanders of the Kamnik–Savinja Alps: Krofička, Ojstrica, Planjava, Mount Brana, Tauern Mountain (Turska gora), Carinthia Mount Rinka (Koroška Rinka), and Cold Mountain (Mrzla Gora).

There is a small church in the settlement. It is dedicated to Christ the King and belongs to the Parish of Solčava. It was built from 1930 to 1931.

In the area of the village, there is a chalybeate (iron-rich) spring under Mount Olševa.
