= Frischauf Lodge at Okrešelj =

- (Frischaufov dom na Okrešlju)
- Location within Slovenia

Highest point
- Elevation: 1,378 m (4,521 ft)
- Coordinates: 46°22′14.880″N 14°35′28.680″E

Geography
- Location: Slovenia
- Parent range: Kamnik–Savinja Alps

The Frischauf Lodge at Okrešelj (Slovene: Frischaufov dom na Okrešlju; 1,378 meters or 4,521 feet) is a mountain lodge that stands above the Logar Valley in northern Slovenia. It is surrounded by the following peaks: Cold Mountain (Mrzla gora), Styria Mount Rinka (Štajerska Rinka), Carinthia Mount Rinka (Koroška Rinka), and Mount Turska (Turska gora). Nearby is 80-meter (260 ft) Rinka Falls. The lodge is named after Johannes Frischauf, and the first lodge was built in 1876 by an Austro-German hiking club. In 1907 it was destroyed by an avalanche and rebuilt again in 1908. In 1991 it was expanded and modernized.

== Starting points ==
- 1 h: from the Logar Valley Hikers' Lodge (Dom planincev v Logarski dolini; 837 m or 2,746 ft)

== Neighbouring lodges ==
- 1½ h : to the Kamnik Saddle Lodge (Koča na Kamniškem sedlu; 1,864 m or 6,115 ft)
- 5½ h : to the Zois Lodge at Kokra Saddle (Cojzova koča na Kokrskem sedlu; 1,793 m or 5,883 ft), via Turski Žleb Ravine and the Sleme Pass
- 4 h: to the Kranj Lodge at Ledine (Kranjska koča na Ledinah; 1,700 m or 5,600 ft), via Savinja Saddle (Savinjsko sedlo)

== Neighbouring peaks ==
- 2½ h: Brana (2,252 m or 7,388 ft)
- 3½ h: Carniola Mount Rinka (Kranjska Rinka; 2,453 m or 8,048 ft)
- 3½ h: Cross (Križ; 2,433 m or 7,982 ft)
- 3½ h: Cold Mountain (Mrzla gora, 2,203 m or 7,228 ft)
- 4 h: Skuta (2,532 m or 8,307 ft)
- 3½ h: Styria Mount Rinka (Štajerska Rinka; 2,289 m or 7,510 ft)
- 2 h: Mount Turska (2,251 m or 7,385 ft)

== See also ==
- Slovenian Mountain Hiking Trail
