= Matk Cirque =

Glacial valley in Slovenia

Coordinates: 46°24′21″N 14°36′42″E

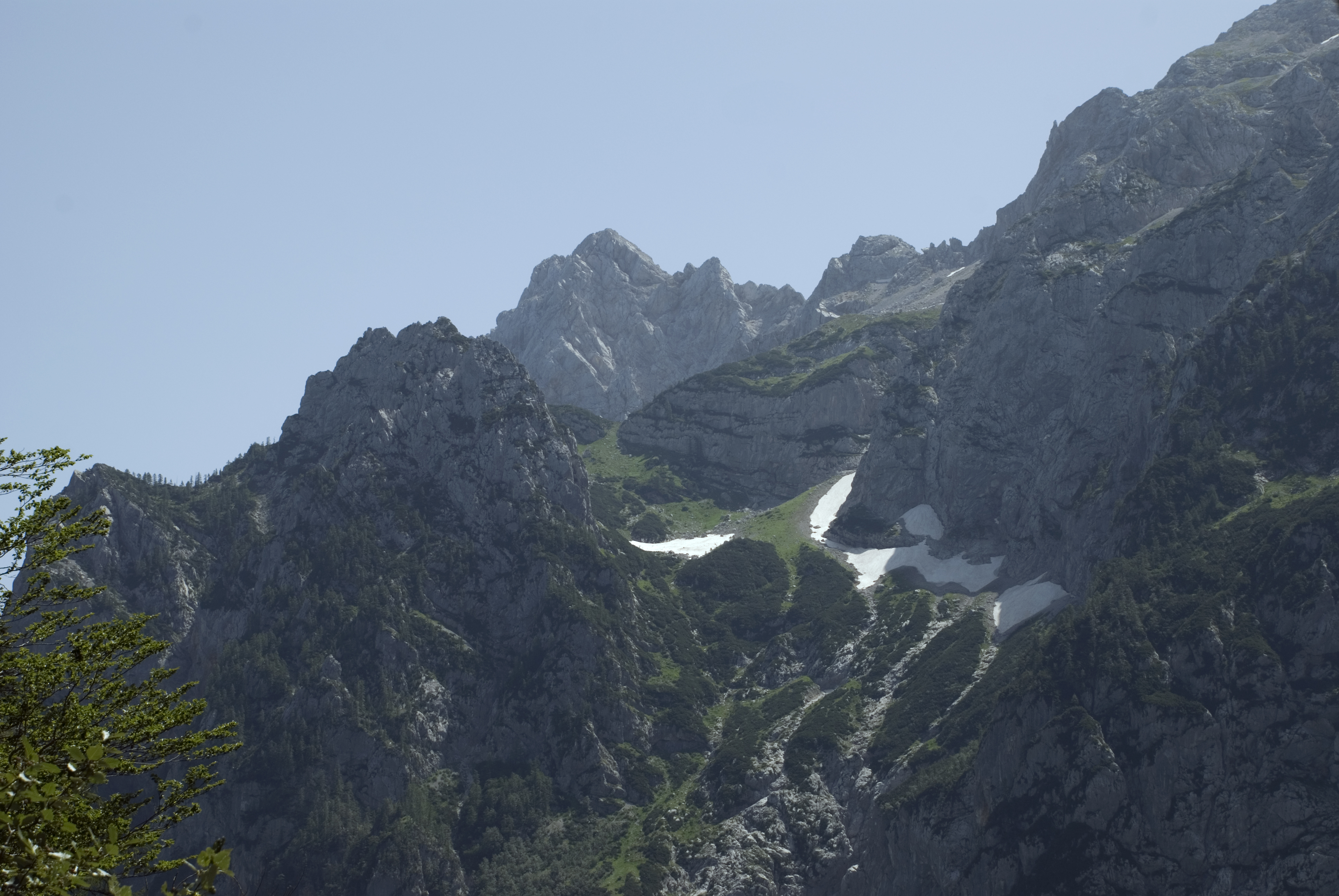
Mount Krofička viewed from the Matk Farm in the Matk Cirque

The Matk Cirque (Slovene: Matkov kot), in older sources also the Jezera Valley (dolina Jezera) is an Alpine glacial valley in Slovenia.

== Geography ==
The Matk Cirque lies in the upper catchment area of the Savinja River in the Kamnik–Savinja Alps of Slovenia. The valley floor ranges between 800 meters (2,600 ft) and 1,000 meters (3,300 ft) in elevation. It is surrounded by high mountains to the southwest, from Cold Mountain (Slovene: Mrzla gora, 2,203 meters or 7,228 feet) to the west to Mount Savinjka (1,694 meters or 5,558 feet) to the east. The border between Slovenia and Austria runs along the western ridge, and to the east it borders the Logar Valley. The Matk Cirque is relatively remote and difficult to reach. There is a forest road into it from the Logar Valley, which also connects the farms in it. At the bottom of the valley, this road branches off from the road leading to the former border crossing at the Pavlič Pass (Slovene: Pavličevo sedlo, German: Pavlitschsattel; 1,339 meters or 4,393 feet) in the Karawanks.

The valley is about 6 kilometers (3.7 mi) long and has the most characteristic glacial features in its upper half. Below Cold Mountain in the southwest part of the valley there are well-formed cirques. The eastern ridge above the valley consists of solid dolomite. The southern part of the valley consists of Triassic limestone, and it is only in the north that late Paleozoic impermeable rock is exposed, which is already part of the Karawanks.

The valley floor spreads out only in the upper part of the cirque. The valley floor is filled by gravel carried by flashy streams and glacial moraines. Jezera Creek has its source in the middle of the valley; below its spring it has carved out and narrowed the valley, creating the picturesque Lamotje Gorge in the limestone rock where it enters the Logar Valley. During the Pleistocene the valley was filled by a glacier that extended to the Logar Valley and joined the glacier there.

== Natural monuments ==
At the head of the Matk Cirque is a cliff known as Hudi prask (1,500 meters or 4,900 feet), below which is a snowfield named Škaf (literally, 'basket, tub'), a natural monument. Water runs onto it through a couloir in the cliff wall, and carves out a large hole in the snow up to 30 meters (98 ft) deep and 20 meters (66 ft) across. A hiking trail leads to Škaf. The Matk Window (Slovene: Matkovo okno), a natural window created by erosion, is also visible from the valley floor. It is an oval opening at the top of the ridge between the Logar Valley and the Matk Cirque, measuring 15 meters (49 ft) high and 8 meters (26 ft) wide, and with an arch 5 meters (16 ft) thick.

== Settlement ==
The Matk Cirque has four isolated farms in clearings surrounded by spruce forest. The highest-elevation farm is the Bukovnik farm, at 1,327 meters (4,354 ft). The valley itself is named after the Matk farm (in standard Slovene Matek), which stands at 1,170 meters (3,840 ft).

== Sources ==
- Inventar najpomembnejše naravne dediščine Slovenije (Matkov kot), Ljubljana, 1991
