= Kamnik Saddle Lodge =

Mountain hostel in Slovenia

- (Koča na Kamniškem Sedlu)
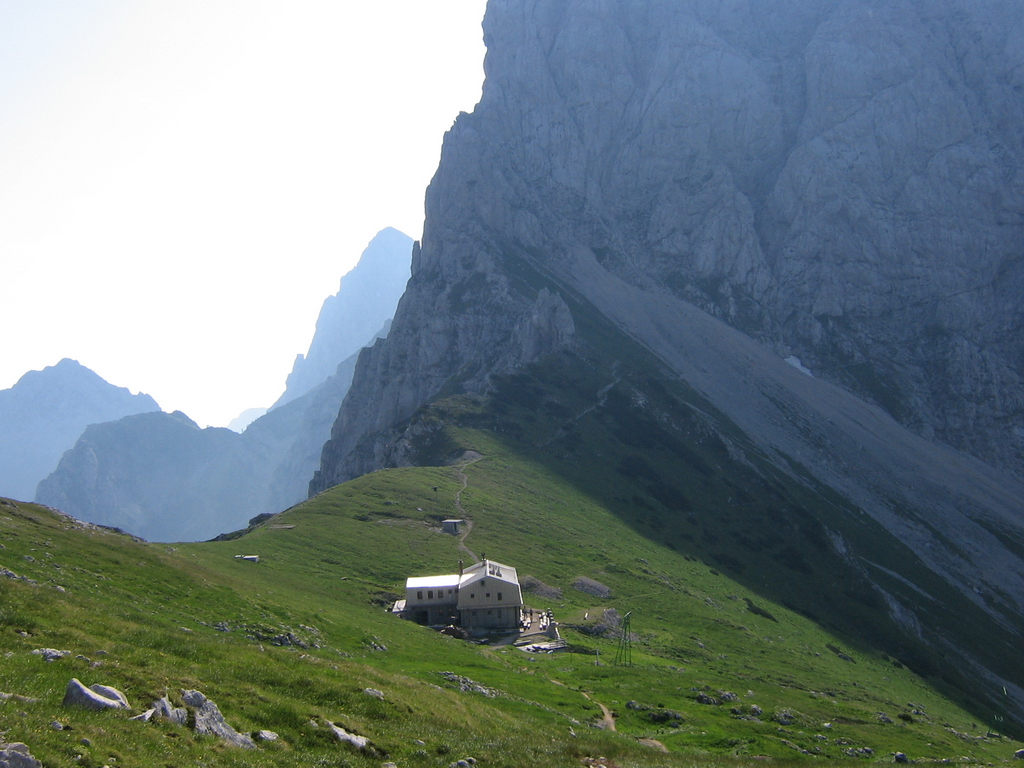

Highest point
- Elevation: 1,864 m (6,115 ft)
- Coordinates: 46°21′33″N 14°36′06″E

Geography
- Location within Slovenia
- Location: Slovenia
- Parent range: Kamnik-Savinja Alps

The Kamnik Saddle Lodge (Slovene: Koča na Kamniškem sedlu; 1,864 meters or 6,115 feet) is a mountain hostel located just below Kamnik Saddle (Kamniško sedlo), with Mount Brana to its west and Mount Planjava to its east, and the Kamnik Bistrica Valley to its south. On its north is a steep descent toward the Logar Valley, home to Rinka Falls.

The hut was first built in 1906, then rebuilt in 1983, and then again slightly modified in 2010.

== Starting points ==
- 3.30 h: from the Kamnik Bistrica Lodge (Dom v Kamniški Bistrici; 601 m)
- 1:30 h: from the Frischauf Lodge at Okrešelj (Frischaufov dom na Okrešlju; 1396 m)
- 1:45 h: from the Suhadolnik Farm (ca. 850 m)

== Neighbouring mountain lodges ==
- 6 h: to the Zois Lodge at Kokra Saddle (Cojzova koča na Kokrskem sedlu; 1793 m) above Turska gora
- 3 h: to the Kocbek Lodge at Korošica (Kocbekov dom na Korošici; 1808 m) above Planjavo

== Neighbouring mountain peaks ==
- 1.30 h: Brana (2252 m)
- 2 h: Planjava (2394 m)
- 4 h: Ojstrica (2350 m) over Škarje
- 2.30 h: Mount Turska (Turska gora; 2251 m)

== See also ==
- Slovenian Mountain Hiking Trail
