= Brana (mountain) =

Mountain in Slovenia

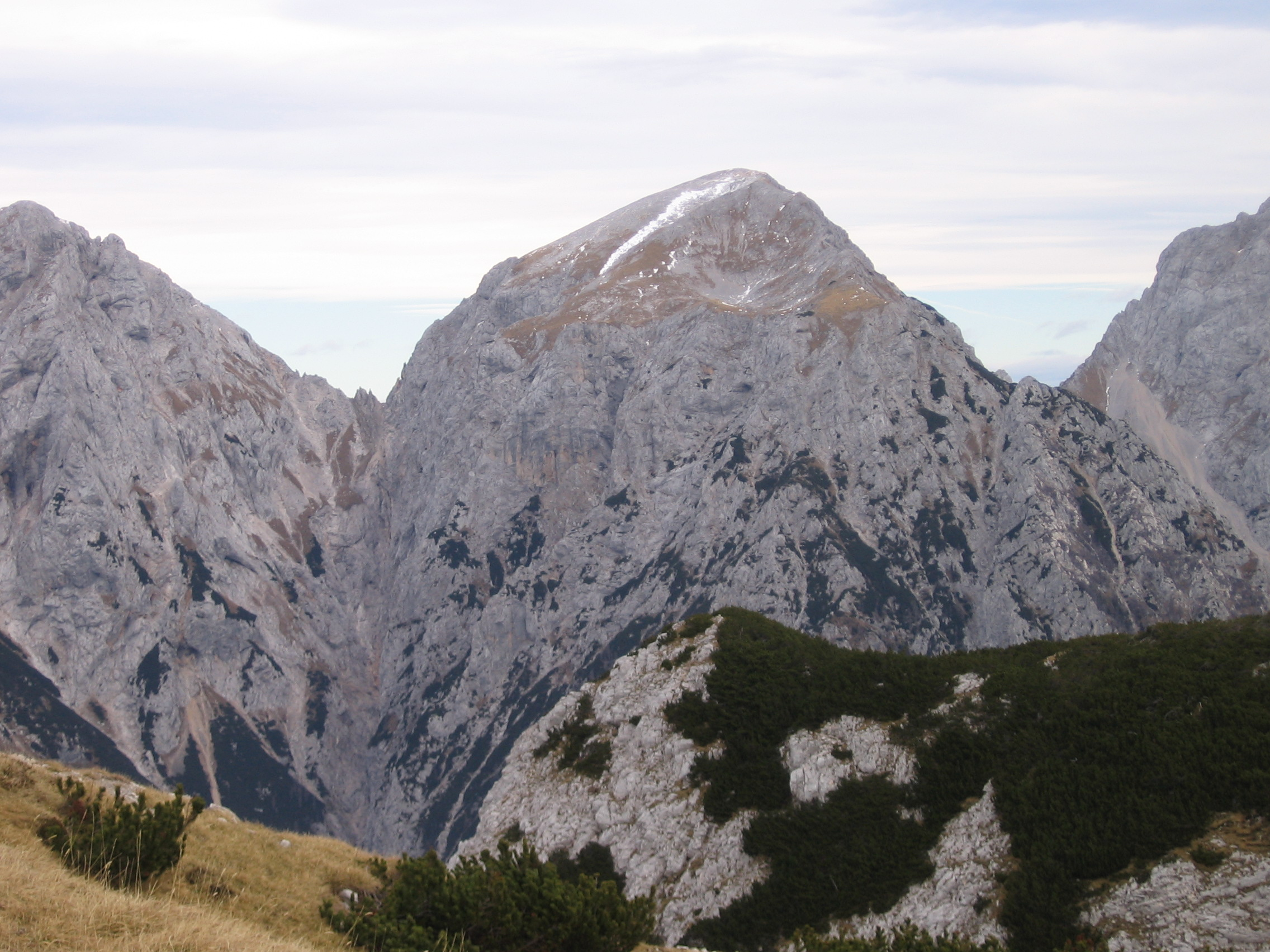

Highest point
- Elevation: 2,253 m (7,392 ft)
- Coordinates: 46°21′17.89″N 14°35′15.48″E

Geography
- Location within Alps
- Location: Slovenia
- Parent range: Kamnik–Savinja Alps

Geology
- Rock age: 250 million years

Climbing
- First ascent: 1875 Anton Bauer et J.Seidl

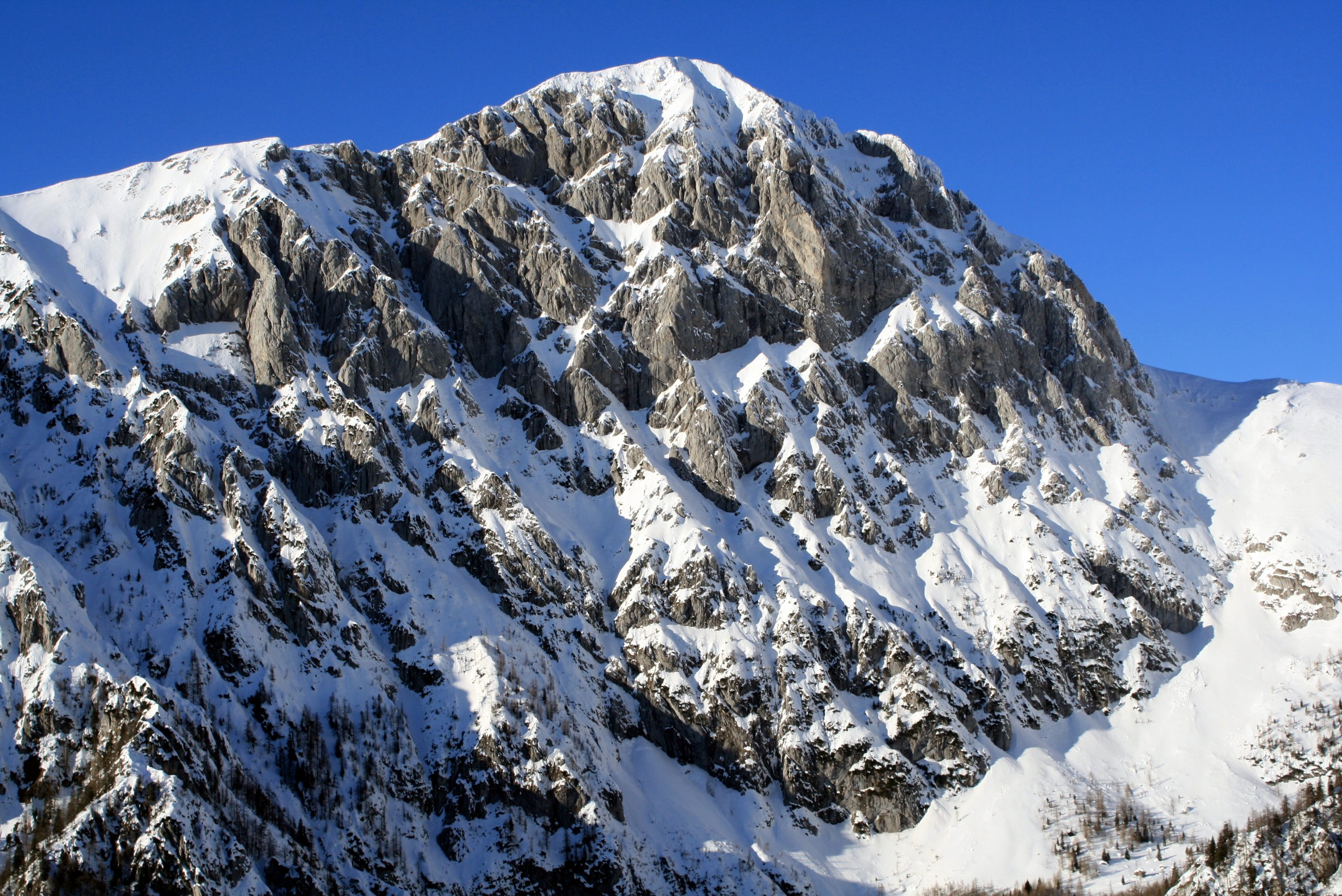
Brana

Brana (2,253 meters or 7,392 feet) is a ridge mountain of the Kamnik Alps in northern Slovenia. It is located between the Logar Valley to the north and the Kamnik Bistrica Valley to the south. The mountain is part of the central Kamnik group, a long ridge that includes the highest peaks of the range such as Grintovec, Kočna, and Skuta. Brana is sometimes climbed as part of a long traverse of the entire Kamnik ridge.

== Starting points ==
- Kamnik, the Kamnik Bistrica Valley
- Solčava, the Logar Valley

== Routes ==
- 2½ hrs from the Frischauf Lodge at Okrešelj at 1,378 meters (4,521 ft)
- 1 hr from the Kamnik Saddle Lodge at 1,864 meters (6,115 ft)
