= Rinker =

Rinker may refer to one of the following individuals:

- Al Rinker (1907–1982), American singer
- Laurie Rinker (born 1962), American golfer
- Lee Rinker (born 1960), American golfer
- Matthew Rinker (born 1984), American politician
- Travis Rinker (born 1968), America soccer player

== See also ==
- Mom Rinker's Rock
- Rinka Falls
- Rinke
- Rinker Group
- Rinker School of Building Construction
