= Rinke =

Rinke is a surname. Notable people with the surname include:

- Barbara Rinke (born 1947), German politician
- Carl J. Rinke (1902–1978), American businessman and politician
- Carmen Rinke (born 1953), Canadian boxer
- Christopher Rinke (born 1960), Canadian wrestler
- Jens Rinke (born 1990), Danish footballer
- Klaus Rinke (1939–2026), German artist
- Piet Rinke (born 1981), Zimbabwean cricketer

== See also ==
- Rinka (disambiguation)
- Rinker
- Rinke Khanna (born 1977), Indian actress
