= Krofička =

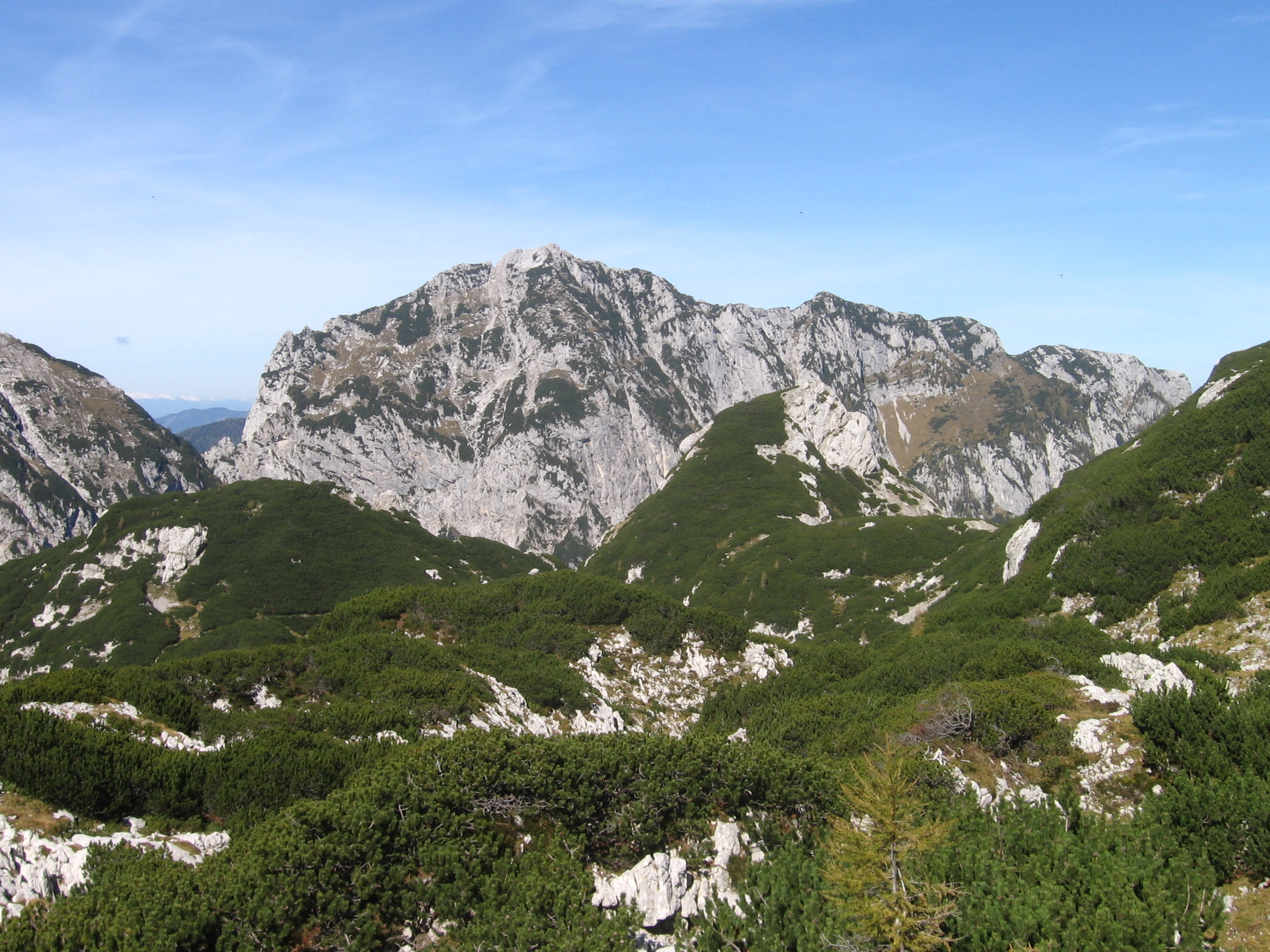

Highest point
- Elevation: 2,083 m (6,834 ft)
- Coordinates: 46°22′32″N 14°38′43″E

Geography
- Location within Slovenia
- Location: Slovenia
- Parent range: Kamnik Alps

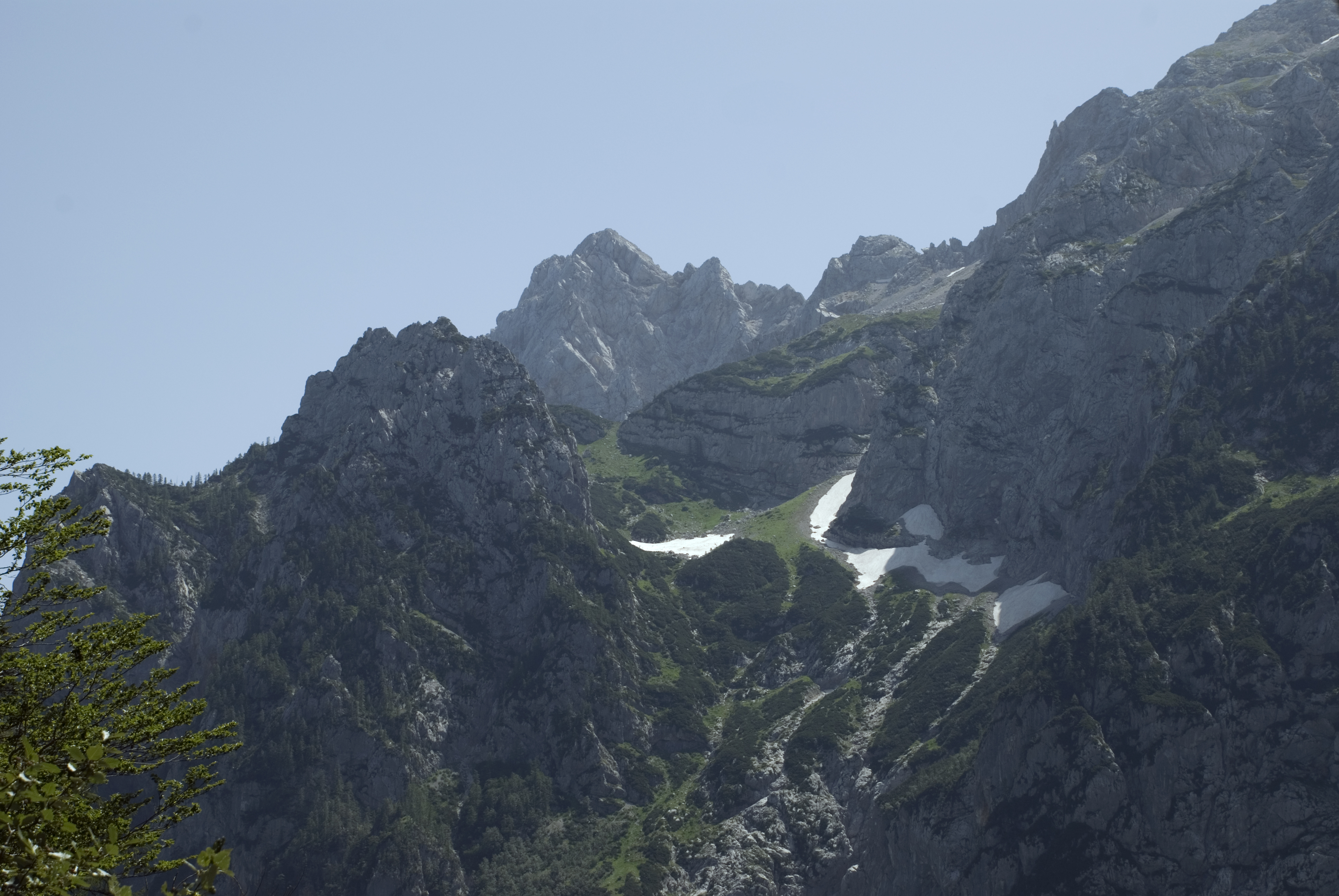
Krofička from the Matk farm

Krofička (2,083 meters or 6,834 feet) is a mountain in the eastern part of the Kamnik Alps. Together with Ute Peak (2,029 meters or 6,657 feet) and nearby Strelovec Peak, it forms a barrier between the Logar Valley and the Roban Cirque (Slovene: Robanov kot). The southern part descends steeply to Škrbina, with which it is connected with Ojstrica. The eastern side is very steep, and grassy on the upper part, and on the western side it descends into a gorge. There is a nice panoramic view at the top.

== Starting place ==
- Solčava, Logar Valley (761 meters or 2,497 feet)
- Solčava, Roban Cirque (700 meters or 2,300 feet)

== Routes ==
- 2½h: from Koča na Klemenči jami pod Ojstrico hut (1,208 meters or 3,963 feet), over Puklovc
- 3h: from Koče na Klemenči jami pod Ojstrico hut, over Škrbino
- 5½h: From the Roban Cirque, via the Knez Pasture (Slovene: Knezova planina)
