= Cold Mountain (Slovenia) =

Mountain in Slovenia

- (Mrzla gora)
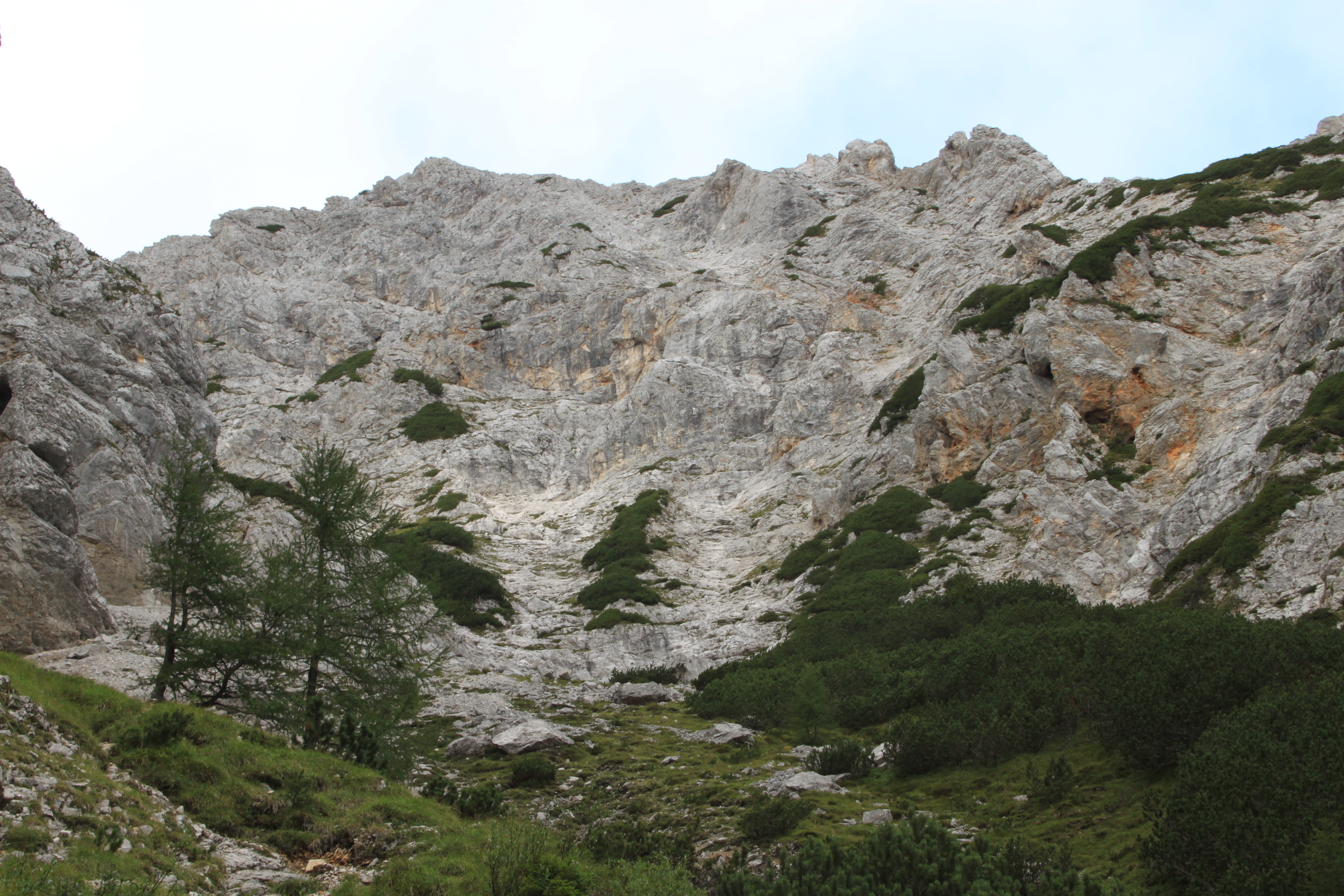

Highest point
- Elevation: 2,203 m (7,228 ft)
- Coordinates: 46°22′38″N 14°34′47″E

Geography
- Location within Slovenia
- Location: Styria, Slovenia
- Parent range: Kamnik Alps

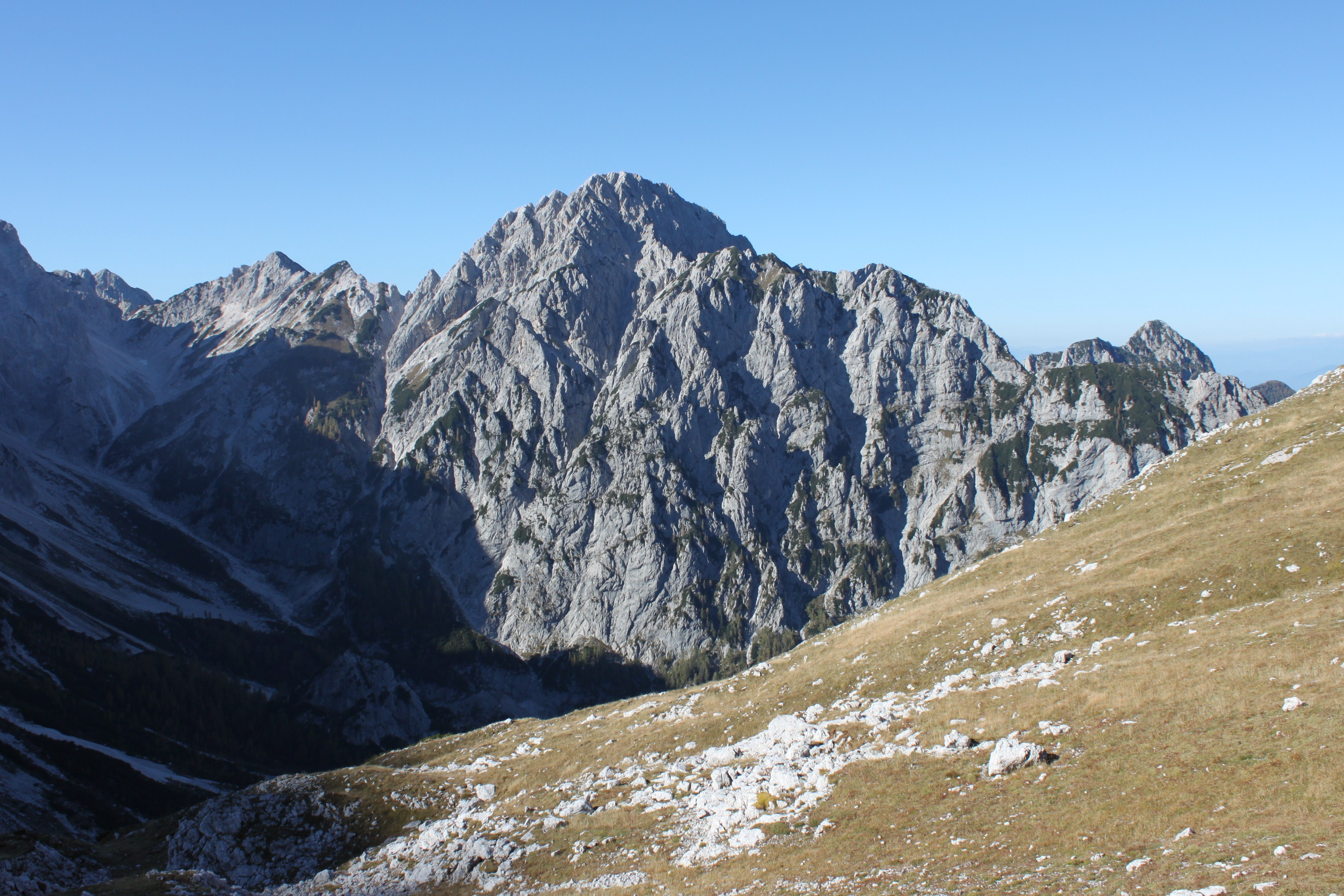
Cold Mountain (Mrzla gora)

Cold Mountain (Slovene: Mrzla gora) is a 2,203-meter (7,228 ft) mountain in the Kamnik Alps. Cold Mountain rises over three valleys: the Logar Valley, the Matk Cirque (Slovene: Matkov kot), and the Vellach Combe (German: Vellacher Kotschna, Slovene: Belska kočna). It is rarely visited because it is relatively difficult to ascend with many exposed areas. The border with Austria runs along the northern and western side, and until 1967 it was difficult to access because of political problems. Its first climbers had problems scaling it. In 1876, Robert von Lendenfeld and a guide named Matijevec from Luče reached the western peak and they descended, thinking they had reached the highest peak. In 1877, Karl Blodig (the first to climb every peak over 4,000 meters or 13,000 feet in Europe) tried two times, but quit due to weather well below the top. In the same year Johannes Frischauf, Piskernik, and Matek finally conquered the top. The Frischauf Lodge on Okrešelj is named after him.

== Routes ==
- 3½h from the Frischauf Lodge at Okrešelj (Slovene: Frischaufov dom na Okrešlju)
- 4½h from the Logar Sisters Lodge (Slovene: Dom sester Logar)
- 5½h from the Czech Lodge at Spodnje Ravni (Slovene: Češka koča na Spodnjih Ravneh)
- 5½h from Vellach through the Vellach Combe
