= Kocbek Lodge at Korošica =

- (Kocbekov dom na Korošici)
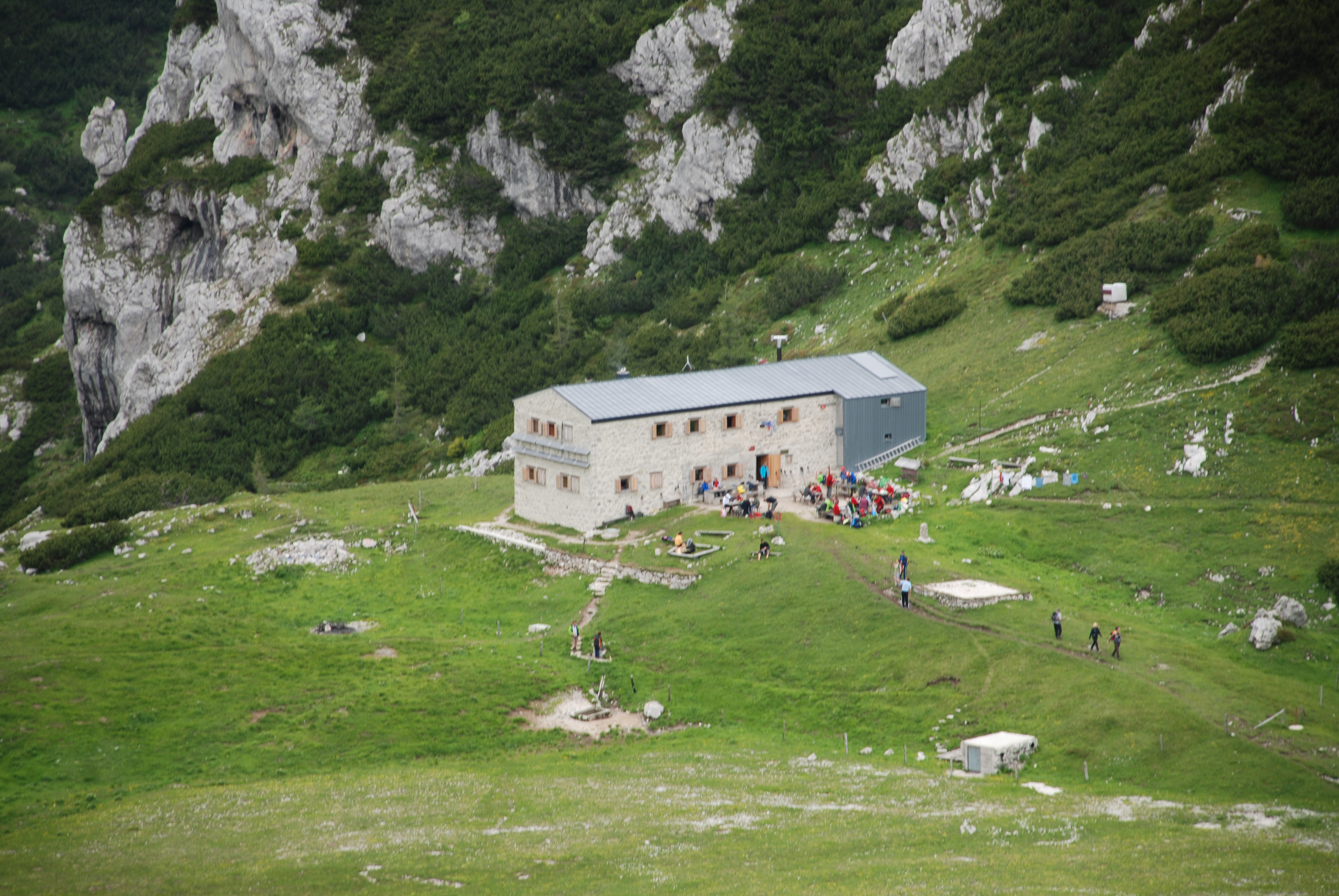

Highest point
- Elevation: 1,803 m (5,915 ft)
- Coordinates: 46°21′18.72″N 14°38′20.040″E

Geography
- Location within Slovenia
- Location: Slovenia
- Parent range: Kamnik-Savinja Alps

The Kocbek Lodge at Korošica (Slovene: Kocbekov dom na Korošici; 1,803 meters or 5,915 feet) is a mountain lodge standing on the Korošica Pasture on the Dleskovec Plateau, below the southern slope of Mount Ojstrica. It is named after Fran Kocbek, an early promoter of mountain hiking in the Kamnik–Savinja Alps. The first lodge, which was built in 1876, burned in 1881. A year later a new one was built. During World War II, it was captured by the Germans. It was expanded and modified from 1969 to 1973. The lodge was destroyed by a fire on October 20, 2017.

== Starting points ==
- 4½h: from the Kamnik Bistrica Lodge (601 m), via Presedljaj Pass
- 2h: from Luče via the Podvežak Pasture (1440 m)
- 2½h: from Luče, via the Ravne Pasture (1500 m)
- 4h: from Rogovilec Inn via the Roban Cirque

== Neighbouring lodges ==
- 4h: to the Domžale Lodge at the Little Pasture (Slovene: Domžalski dom na Mali planini; 1526 m), via Mount Horse (Konj)
- 3h: to the Kamnik Saddle Lodge (Slovene: Koča na Kamniškem sedlu; 1864 m), via the southern slopes of Mount Planjava
- 3½h: to the Klemenšek Cave Lodge at Ojstrica (Slovene: Koča na Klemenči jami pod Ojstrico; 1208 m), via Škarje Pass

== Neighbouring mountains ==
- 1h: Luče Mount Dedec (Lučki Dedec; 2023 m)
- 1½h: Ojstrica (2350 m)
- 2h: Planjava (2394 m), via the Petkove Njive Pasture
- 2½h: Planjava (2394 m), via Luče Mount Baba
- 1½h: Big Peak (Veliki vrh; 2110 m)

== See also ==
- Slovenian Mountain Hiking Trail
