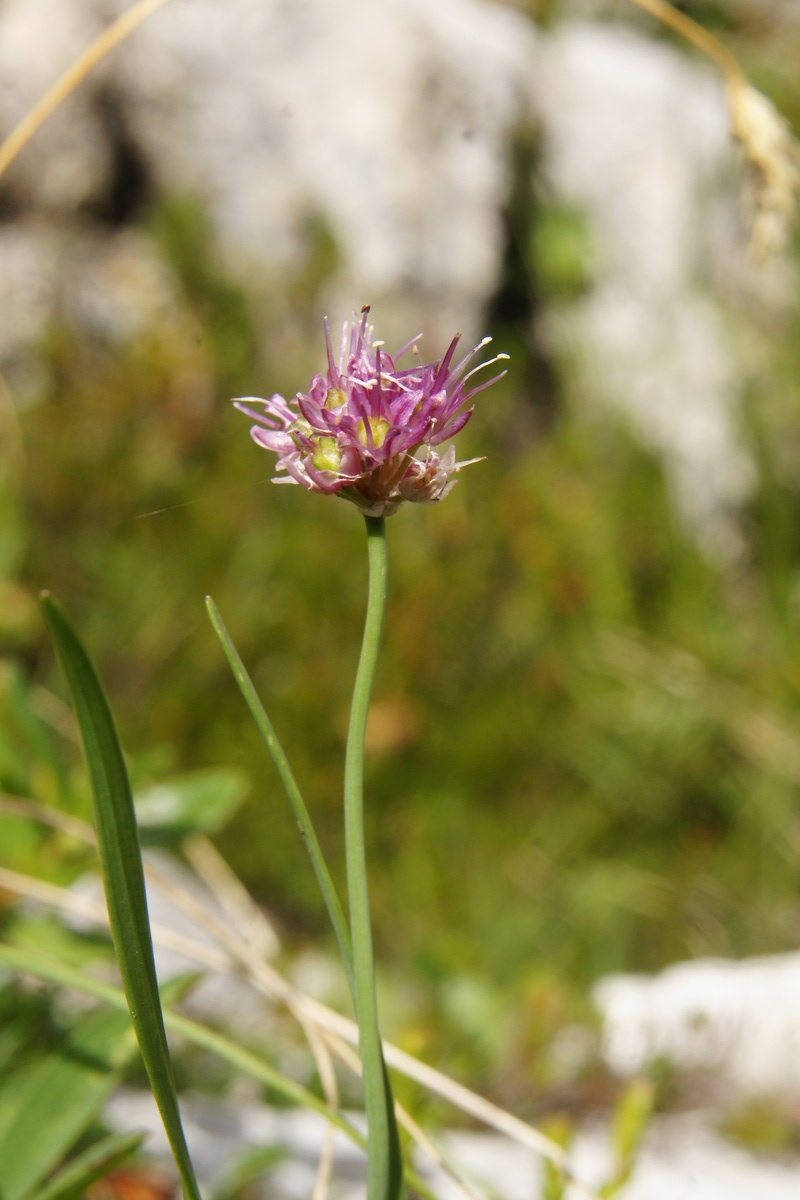

Conservation status
- Data Deficient (IUCN 3.1)

Scientific classification
- Kingdom: Plantae
- Clade: Tracheophytes
- Clade: Angiosperms
- Clade: Monocots
- Order: Asparagales
- Family: Amaryllidaceae
- Subfamily: Allioideae
- Genus: Allium
- Subgenus: A. subg. Polyprason
- Species: A. kermesinum

Binomial name
- Allium kermesinum Rchb.

= Allium kermesinum =

Species of plant

Allium kermesinum is a flowering plant in the genus Allium known by the common name crimson leek or Kamnik leek. It is endemic to Slovenia.

== Description ==
Allium kermesinum has a long bulb, with ridged leaves similar to those of chives. The flowers vary from red to pink and are faintly fragrant, reminiscent of garlic. It blossoms between August and September. It is endemic to Slovenia, where it grows in the Kamnik–Savinja Alps.
