= Logar Valley =

Logar Valley may refer to one of the following

- Logar River valley, Afghanistan
- Logar Valley (Slovenia), a valley in the Municipality of Solčava, northern Slovenia
