= Rinkel =

Rinkel is a surname. Notable people with the surname include:

- Elfriede Rinkel (1922–2018), German SS guard at the Ravensbrück concentration camp
- Ivo Rinkel (1920–2000), Dutch tennis and field hockey player
- John Rinkel (1905–1975), English sprinter

== See also ==
- Rinke
