= Rinka =

Rinka may refer to:

== People with the given name ==
- John Rinka (born 1948), American college basketball player
- Silvia Rinka (born 1962), East German swimmer
- Rinka (model) (born 1973), Japanese fashion model
- Rinka Duijndam (born 1997), Dutch handballer
- Rinka Watanabe (渡辺 倫果; born 2002), Japanese figure skater

== Places ==
- Rinka Falls, a waterfall in the Logar Valley, northern Slovenia

== Other uses ==
- Rinka, a dog belonging to Norman Scott, shot in a bungled murder attempt
