= Johannes Frischauf =

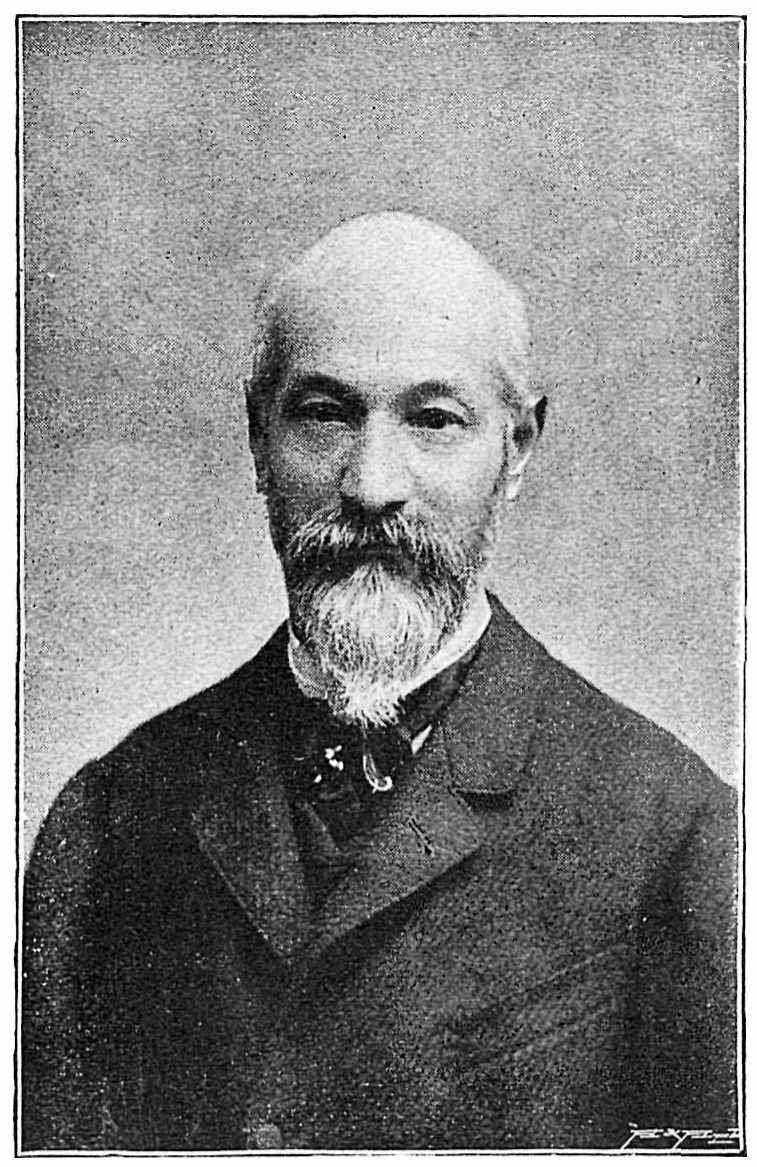
- Scientific career
- Fields: Mathematics

Johannes Frischauf (17 September 1837 in Vienna – 7 January 1924 in Graz) was an Austrian mathematician, physicist, astronomer, geodesist and alpinist.

== Life and work ==
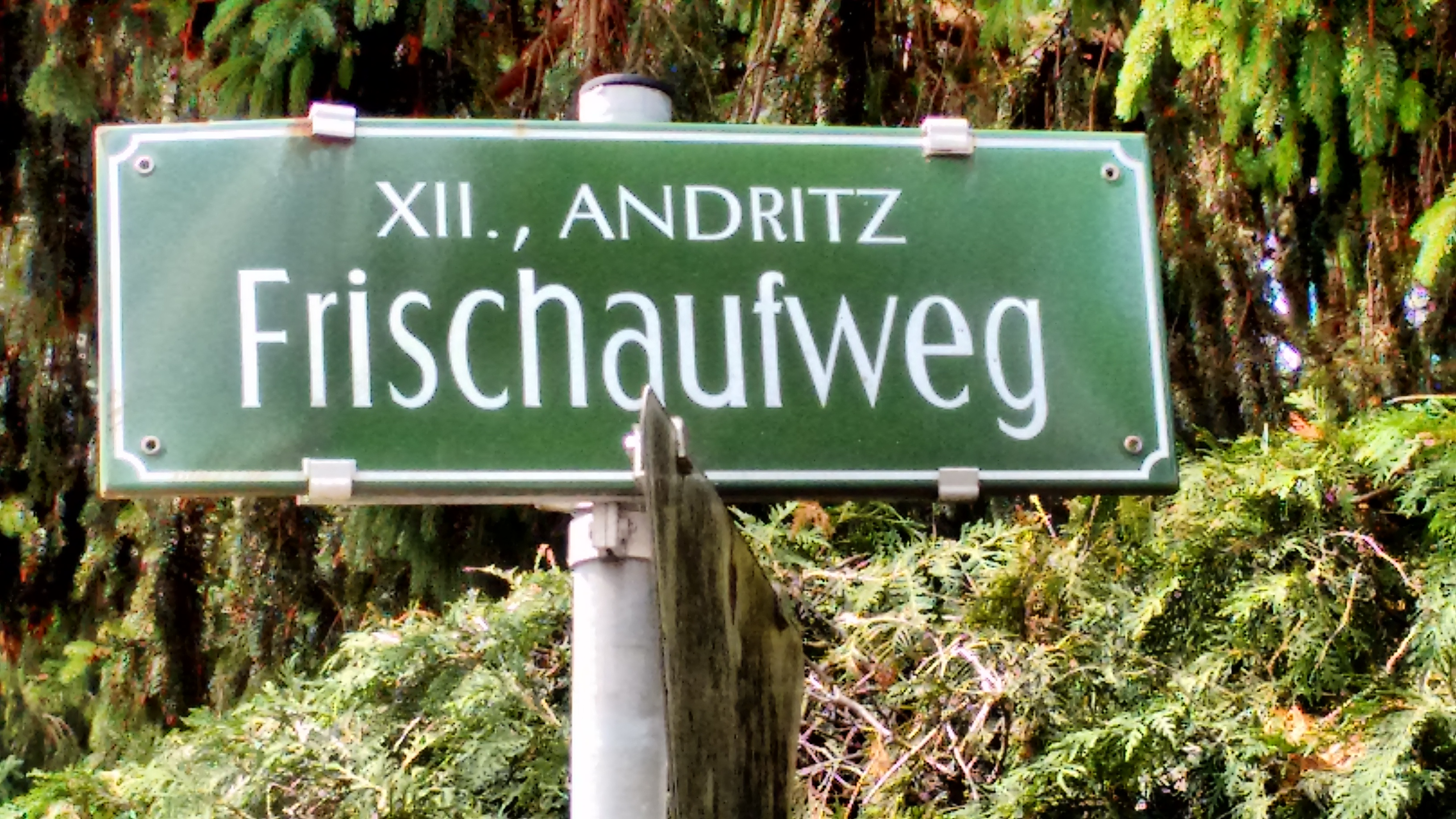
Graz: Street sign "Frischaufweg"

Frischauf passed the matura at the Academic Gymnasium in Vienna and in 1857 studied mathematics, physics, astronomy at the University of Vienna, as well as geodesy, chemistry, mechanics at the Technischen Hochschule Vienna. He obtained the doctorate in 1864, and became Privatdozent for mathematics at the University of Vienna and assistant at the observatory of the university. In 1863 he was habilitated in mathematics. Starting in 1863, he was professor at the University of Graz for pure and applied mathematics. He worked together with Ludwig Boltzmann. Frischauf developed a new method of map design and wrote textbooks on arithmetics and geometry – for instance in 1872 and 1876 he wrote summaries of the then current knowledge about non-Euclidean geometry (which he called "absolute geometry"). In 1885 he was elected as a member of the Leopoldina.

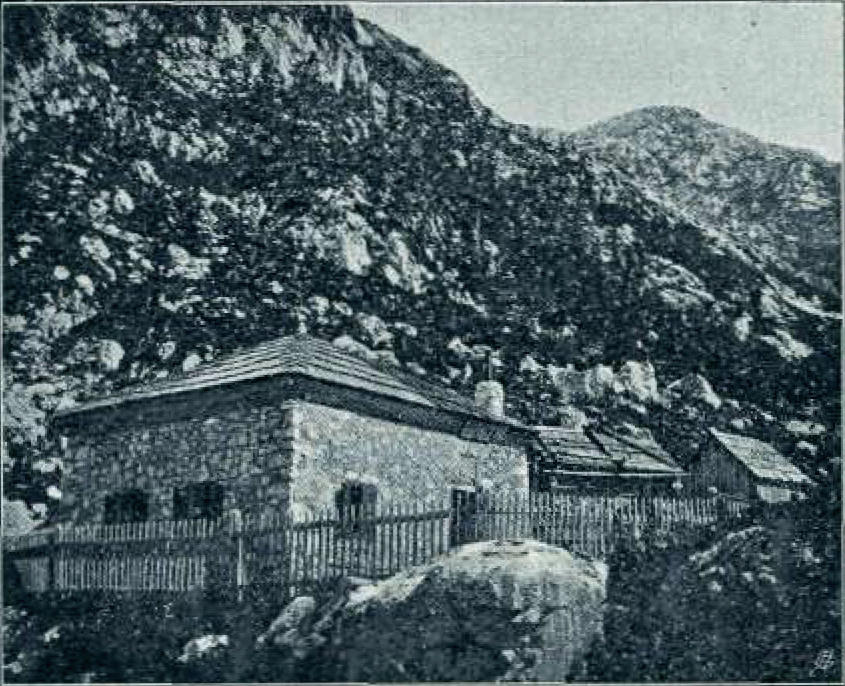
The Frischauf Lodge at Okrešelj (Alois Beer, 1903)

Starting with 1868, Frischauf pioneered the touristic development of the Sannthaler and Steiner Alps by opening ways and huts. The streets over the Paulitschsattel and the connection Sulzbach-Leutsch were built because of his initiatives. Together with Franz von Juraschek and Mathias Spreiz he was the first to climb the Admonter Reichenstein. Frischauf defended the view at a time of violent national conflicts, that alpinism should not be subordinated under nationalism or religion or political views. He participated in the foundation of the Croatian Mountaineering Association. Frischauf's Funerary urn was placed on the Scheichenspitze in the Dachstein Mountains. His estate is located at the University of Graz.

== Works (selection) ==
- Über die Bahn der Asia. In: Sitz. Berichte Kais. Akad. Wiss. Wien, Mat.-nat. Cl. Band 45, 1862, pp. 435–442.
- Bahnbestimmung des Planeten 67 Asia. In: Sitz. Berichte Kais. Akad. Wiss. Wien, Mat.-nat. Cl. Band 53, 1866, pp. 96–141.
- Einleitung in die analytische Geometrie. Leuschner & Lubensky, Graz 1871.
- Zum Rechnen mit unvollständigen Zahlen. In: Zeitschrift math. naturw. Unterr. Band 26, 1895, pp. 161–172.
- Beiträge zur Landesaufnahme und Kartographie des Erdsphäroids. B. G. Teubner, Leipzig 1919.
- Hochthor bei Johnsbach. In: Jahrbuch Steir. Gebirgsverein. 1873, p. 41.
- Reichenstein bei Admont. In: Jahrbuch Steir. Gebirgsverein. 1873, p. 54.
- Frischauf, J. (1876). Elemente der absoluten Geometrie. Leipzig.
- Die Sannthaler Alpen. Brockhausen und Bräuser, Wien 1877.
- Ein Ausflug auf den Monte Baldo.Wien 1883, Wiener Touristen-Führer.11.
- "Auf Cherso" [On Cherso]. Mitteilungen des Deutschen und Österreichischen Alpenvereins (in German). 16 (12): 156–159. 1890.
- Das Uskoken-Gebirge. In: Zeitschrift DÖAV (1890), pp. 474–484.
- Krakau bei Murau. Steirische Sommerfrischen, Band 1, Leuschner & Lubensky, Graz 1896, Hrg. vom Steirischen Gebirgsvereine.
