= Ojstrica =

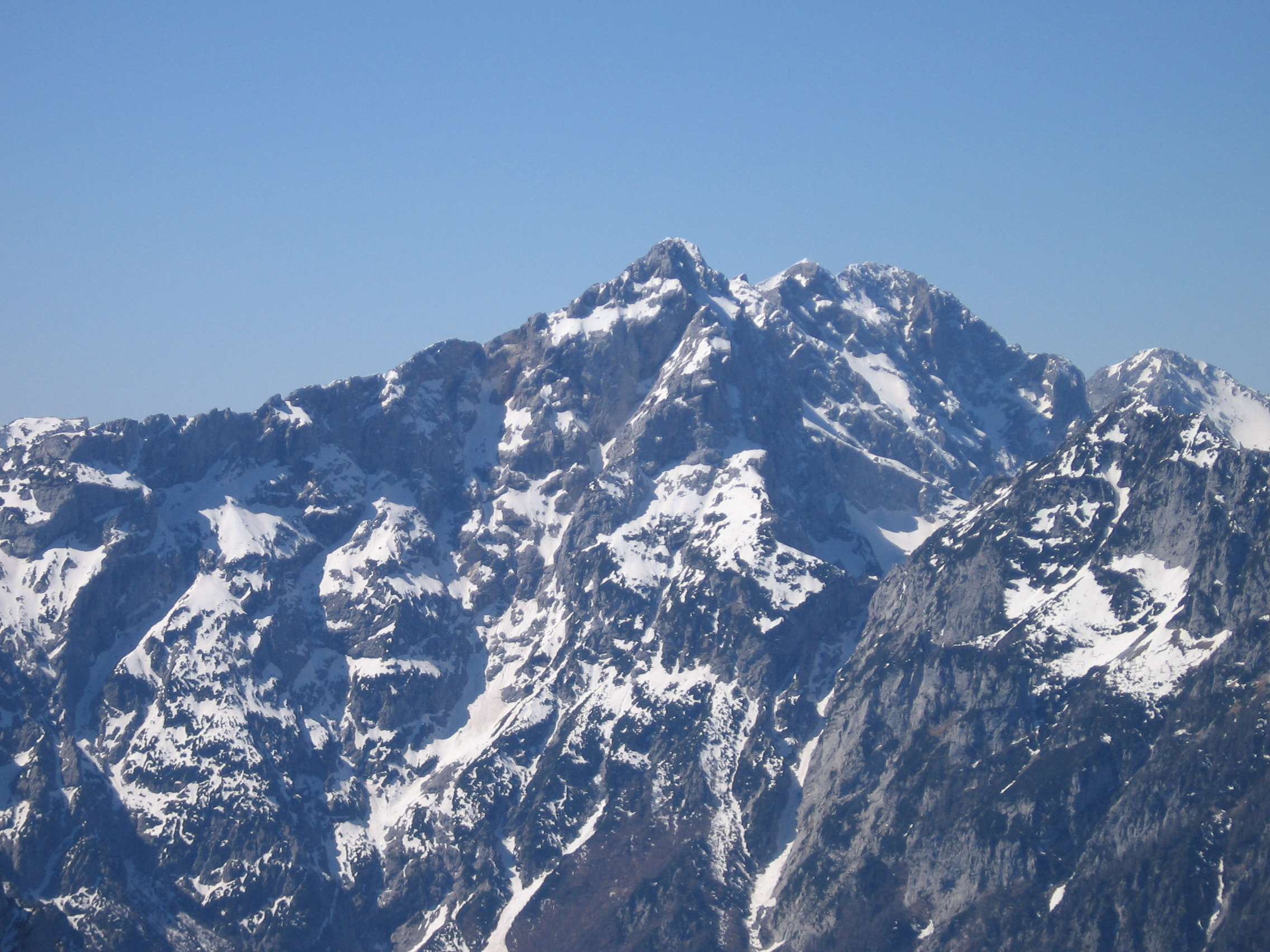

Highest point
- Elevation: 2,350 m (7,710 ft)
- Coordinates: 46°21′50.220″N 14°38′14.064″E

Geography
- Location within Slovenia
- Location: Slovenia
- Parent range: Kamnik–Savinja Alps

Geology
- Rock age: 250 million years
- Mountain type: limestone

Climbing
- First ascent: 1823 by Ernest Joanelli
- Easiest route: South

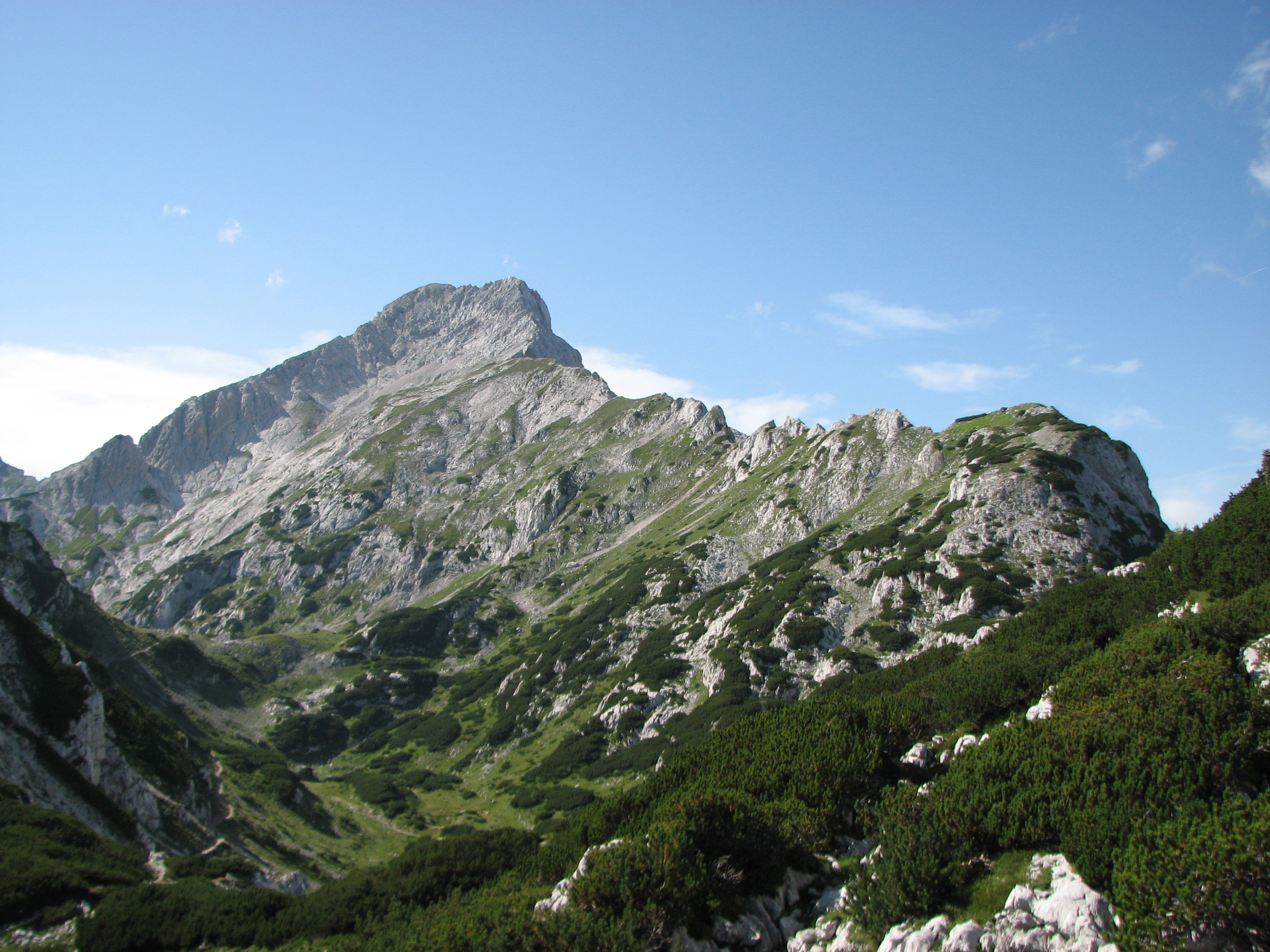
Ojstrica from Dleskovška planota

Ojstrica (2,350 meters or 7,710 feet) is a mountain in the eastern part of the Kamnik Alps with a pyramid-shaped top that is visible from far away. The name Ojstrica derives from the Slovene word oster 'sharp'. There is a 600-meter (2,000 ft) high wall on its northern side to the bottom of the Logar Valley. The eastern side, down to the Roban Cirque (Slovene: Robanov kot), also has a high wall. There are several climbing routes.

== Starting points ==
- Kamnik, Kamniška Bistrica (601 meters or 1,972 feet)
- Solčava, Logar Valley (761 meters or 2,497 feet)
- Solčava, Roban Cirque (c. 700 meters or 2,300 feet)

== Routes ==
- 1½h: from Kocbek Lodge at Korošica (1,808 meters or 5,932 feet), on the southern side
- 1½h: from Kocbek Lodge at Korošica (1,808 meters or 5,932 feet), on the eastern side
- 4h: from Kamnik Saddle Lodge (1,864 meters or 6,115 feet), below Planjava via Škarje
- 3½h: from Klemenšek Cave Lodge at Ojstrica (1,208 meters or 3,963 feet), via Škarje
- 3h: from Klemenšek Cave Lodge at Ojstrica (1,208 meters or 3,963 feet), via Škrbina
