= Carl J. Rinke =

American politician (1902–1979)

Carl J. Rinke (October 1, 1902 – February 11, 1979) was an American businessman and politician.

Rinke was born on a farm in Wheaton, Traverse County, Minnesota. He graduated from high school and then went to the West Central School of Agriculture (University of Minnesota Morris) in Morris, Minnesota. Rinke served in the United States Army, in the Signal Corps, during World War II. Rinke served in the Minnesota House of Representatives from 1947 to 1954.
