= Carinthia Mount Rinka =

Mountain in Slovenia

Carinthia Mount Rinka (Cross)
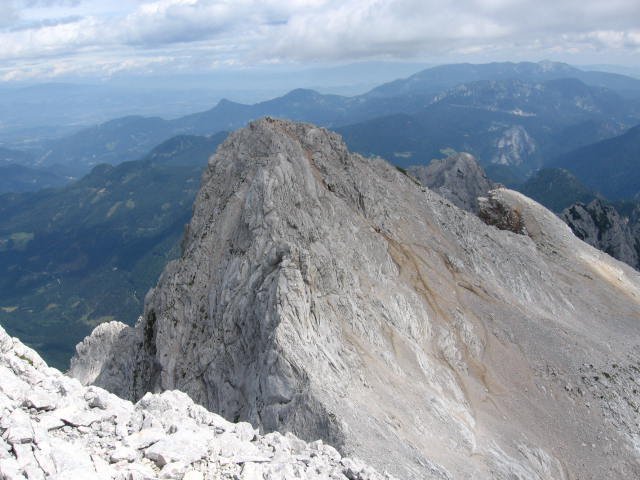

Highest point
- Elevation: 2,433 m (7,982 ft)
- Coordinates: 46°22′0.3″N 14°33′54″E

Naming
- Native name: Koroška Rinka (Slovene)

Geography
- Location within Slovenia
- Location: northern Slovenia
- Parent range: Kamnik–Savinja Alps

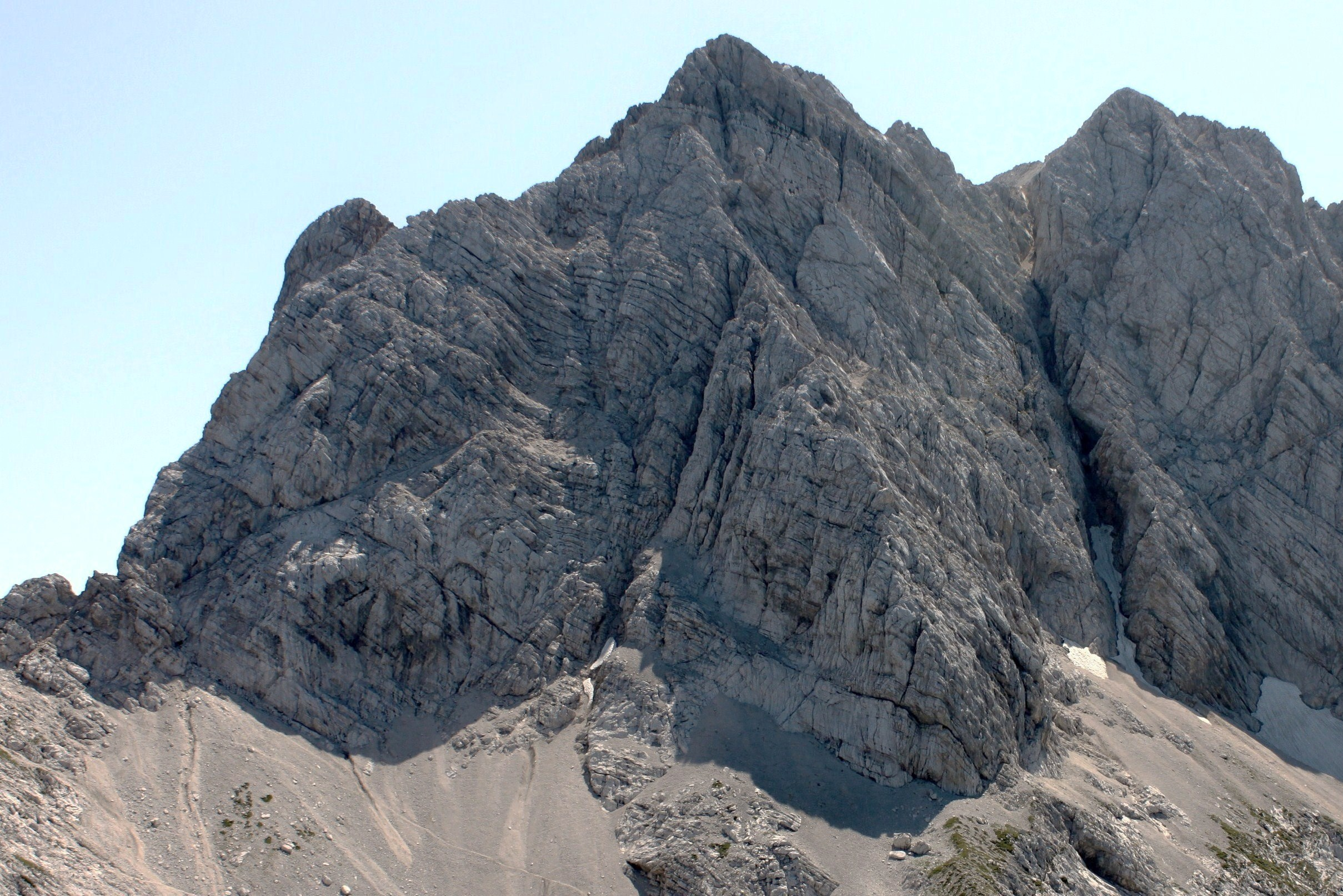
Carinthia Mount Rinka

Carinthia Mount Rinka (Slovene: Koroška Rinka) or the Cross (Križ), with an elevation of 2,433 metres (7,982 ft), is a mountain in the central Kamnik–Savinja Alps in northern Slovenia. It is connected via a pass with Carniola Mount Rinka (Kranjska Rinka, 2,453 m or 8,048 ft), the northern ridge descends to the Jezersko Pass and the Savinja Pass, whereas the western ridge with Styria Mount Rinka (Štajerska Rinka, 2,374 m or 7,789 ft) ends with the Turski Žleb Ravine. There is also the fourth Rinka, called Little Mount Rinka (Mala Rinka; 2,289 m or 7,510 ft). The names of the mountains reflect their positions at the border between the traditional Slovene regions of Carinthia, Carniola, and Styria.

== Starting points ==
- Zgornje Jezersko (906 m)
- Logar Valley (761 m)

== Routes ==
- 3h: from the Carniolan Lodge at Ledine (1,700 m or 5,600 ft), passing the Jezersko Pass
- 3½h: from the Frischauf Lodge at Okrešelj (1,396 m or 4,580 ft), through the Turski Žleb Ravine
