= Skuta =

Mountain in Slovenia

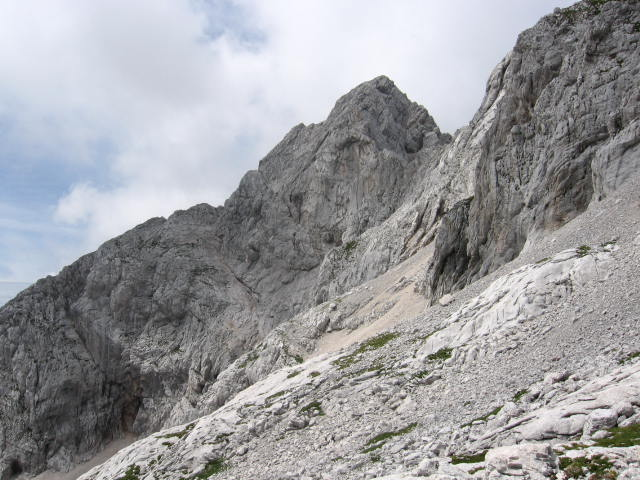
- Skuta, July 2005

Highest point
- Elevation: 2,532 m (8,307 ft)
- Coordinates: 46°21′50″N 14°33′11″E

Geography
- Location: Slovenia
- Parent range: Kamnik–Savinja Alps

Skuta (pronounced [ˈskuːta], 2,532 meters or 8,307 feet) is the third-highest peak in the Kamnik Alps and is known for the Skuta Glacier, which is the easternmost glacier in the Alps. A mountain lodge, operated by the Ljubljana Matica Alpine Club, stands below Skuta.

== Name ==
Although the Slovene common noun skuta refers to a ricotta-like cheese, there is no evidence that this word is the source of the mountain's name.
