= Savinja =

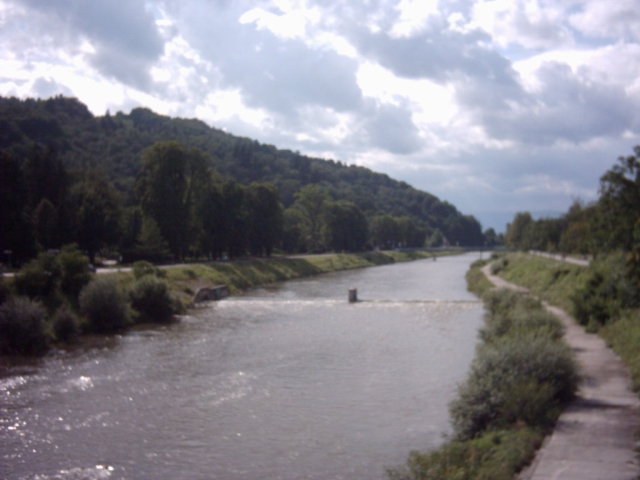
- The Savinja in Celje, before it turns south to Laško

Location
- Country: Slovenia

Physical characteristics
- Source
  - location: Rinka Falls
  - elevation: 1,310 m (4,300 ft)
- Mouth
  - location: Sava
  - coordinates: 46.0838°N 15.1720°E
- Length: 101.8 km (63.3 mi)
- Basin size: 1,848 km^{2} (714 sq mi)

Basin features
- Progression: Sava→ Danube→ Black Sea

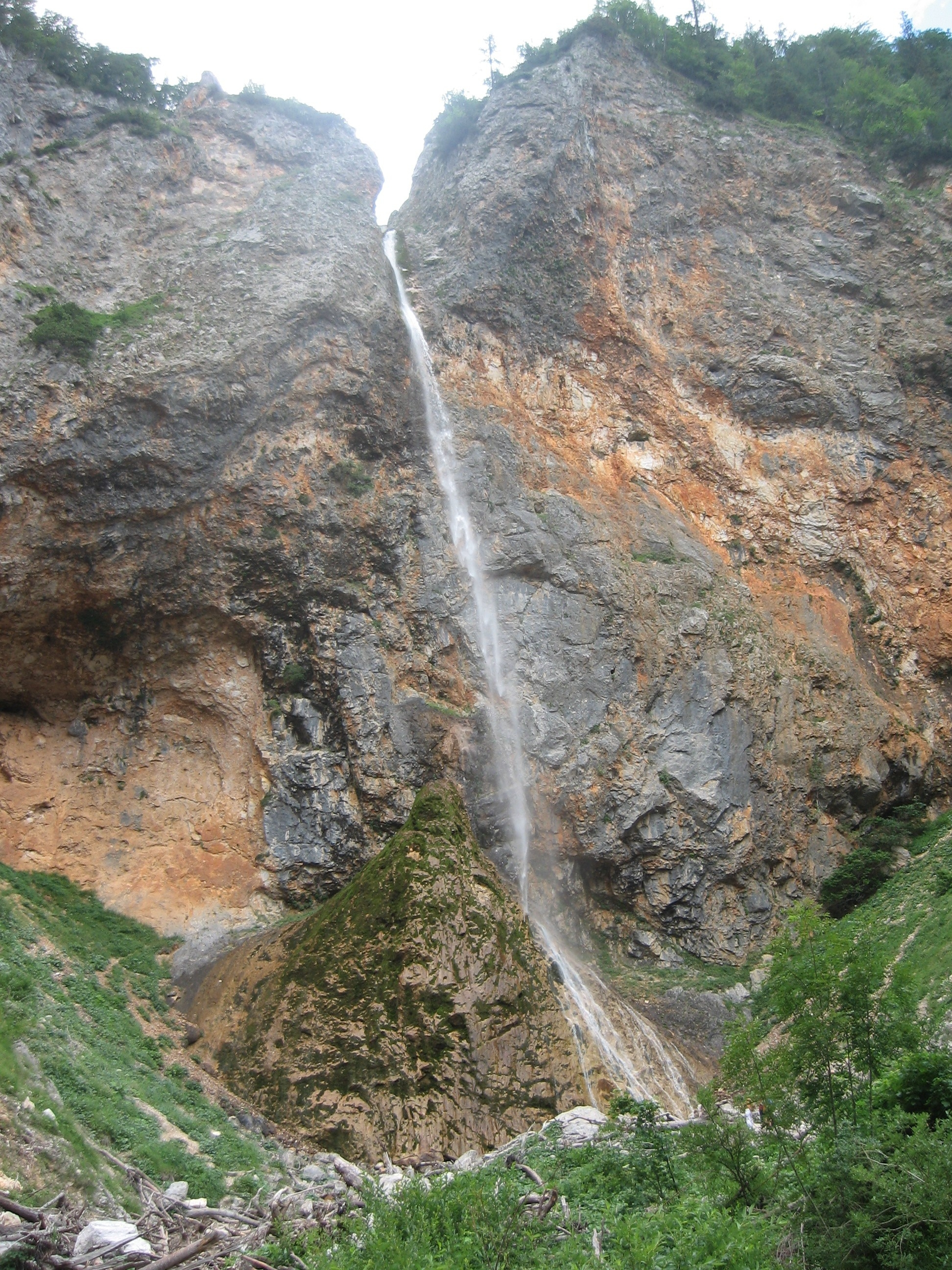
Rinka Falls, the source of the Savinja

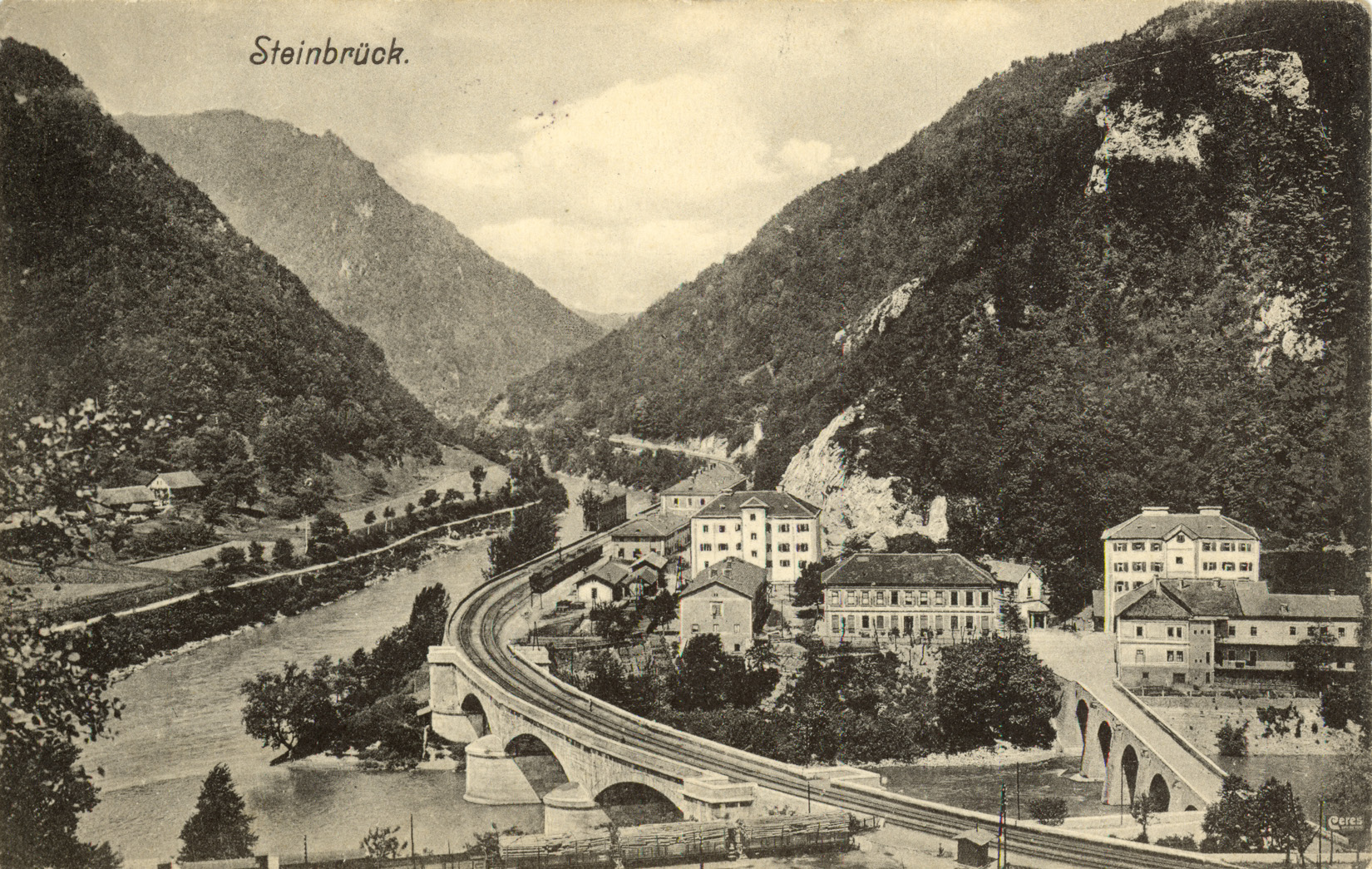
The confluence of the Sava and the Savinja at Zidani Most, where the Savinja is traversed by three bridges. The photo was taken in 1914, before the construction of the new railroad bridge.

The Savinja (pronounced [saˈʋìːnja]) is a river in northeast Slovenia which flows mostly in the Upper and Lower Savinja Valley (Slovene: Zgornja in Spodnja Savinjska dolina) and through the cities of Celje and Laško. The Savinja is the main river of the Savinja Alps (Sln. Savinjske Alpe). It flows into the Sava River at the town of Zidani Most. It has often flooded, such as in the 1960s, 1990, and 1995. The Savinja has a length of 101.75 kilometres (63.22 mi) and a catchment area of 1,847.7 km^{2} (713.4 sq mi).

== Sources ==
The stream is created by Rinka Falls, which flows along a regulated riverbed to the lower end of the Logar Valley, where it flows into Jezera Creek, from which point it becomes the Savinja River. This spring has been proclaimed a natural heritage object, and Rinka Falls is one of the most beautiful and best-known waterfalls in Slovenia. It is the highest waterfall of the 20 waterfalls in the Logar Valley and is visited throughout the year. In the winter it is popular for ice-climbers. The best view of the waterfall is from Kamnik Saddle (Slovene: Kamniško sedlo).

== Tributaries ==
The main tributaries of the Savinja are the Jušef and the Klobaša at Solčava, the Lučnica at Luče, the Ljubnica at Ljubno, the Dreta at Nazarje, the Paka at Šmartno ob Paki, and the Ložnica and Voglajna with the Hudinja at Celje.

== Water quality ==
The quality of water is first-class to Radmirje, then it falls to second class and after to third.

== Hydronym and etymology ==
The name Savinja (attested in written sources in 980 as Sovuina) is derived from *Savьn′a, in turn derived from the hydronym Sava, of which it is a tributary. The German name Sann was attested later. In the local dialect, the river is known as Sáu̯ńe. The form *Savьn′a should have yielded Savnja as the current Slovene name, but it was reshaped on the model of Hudinja. The name is believed to ultimately not be of Slavic origin, but of older pre-Slavic origin.

The German name Sann was also used in some older English sources; for example, in the ninth edition of Encyclopædia Britannica from 1911.

Some other names for the river include:

- fluvius Sana (9th century)
- Souina (980)
- inter fluenta Souuuę et Sounę (1016)
- Seuna (1016)
- Souna (1025,1028)
- inter fluenta Souuuae et Sounae (1028)
- Sounital (1042)

The Celtic goddess Adsaluta, whose altars were found in the area of the settlement of Sava, was long identified with the Savinja. Modern scholars have rejected the connection.

== Life along the river ==
Raftsmen from Ljubno traveled along the river until the 1950s. In their memory, a bronze sculpture of a raftsman (Splavar), created in 1961 by Boris Kalin, stands on the river's left bank in Celje.
