= Planjava =

Mountain in Slovenia

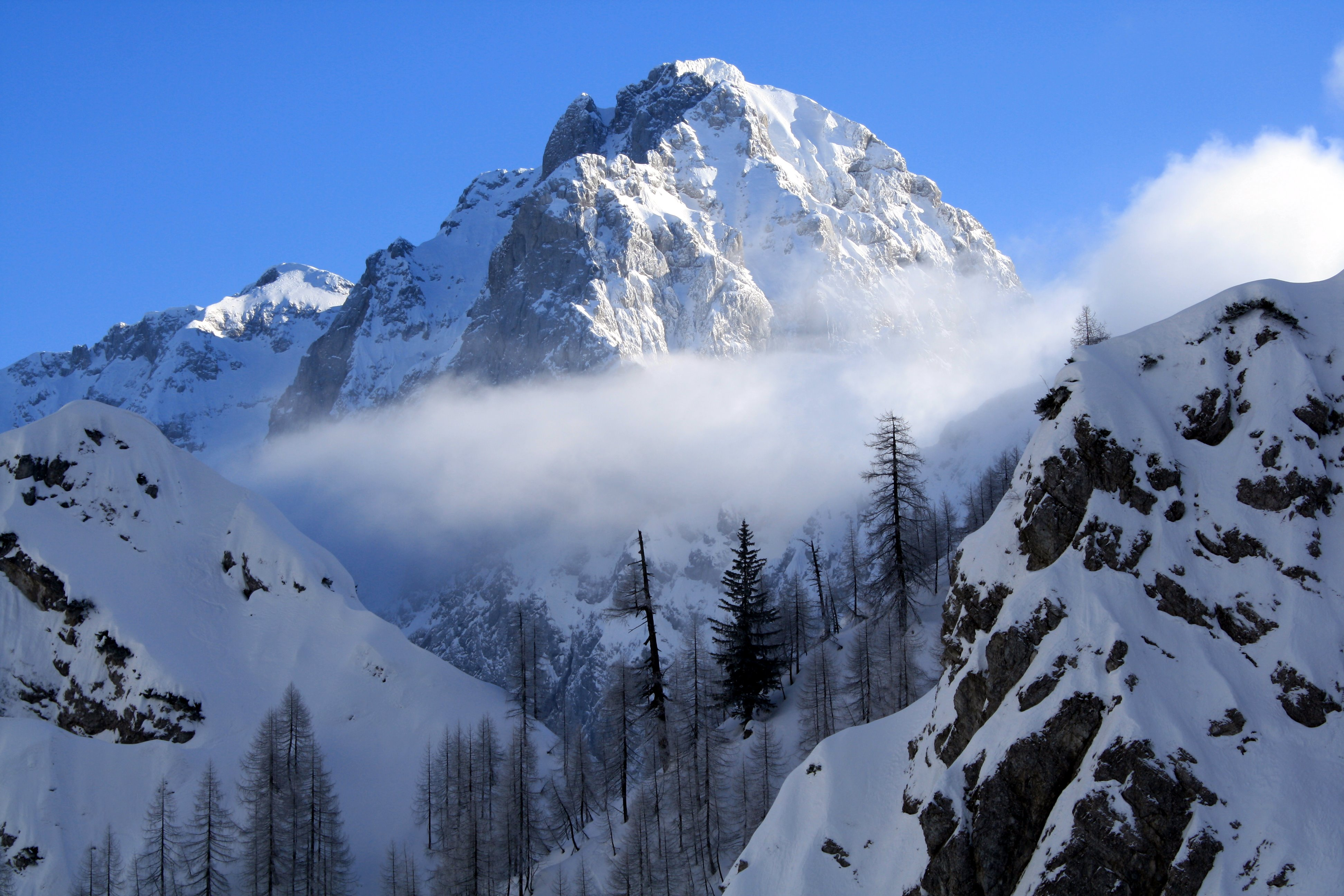
- Planjava

Highest point
- Elevation: 2,394 m (7,854 ft)
- Prominence: 530 m (1,740 ft)
- Coordinates: 46°21′23.51″N 14°36′36.02″E

Geography
- Location within Slovenia
- Location: Slovenia
- Parent range: Kamnik–Savinja Alps

Planjava (2,394 meters or 7,854 feet) is the highest mountain of the eastern Kamnik Alps in northern Slovenia. On the western side there is a steep wall over the Kamnik Saddle (Kamniško sedlo), on the eastern side runs a long ridge, and on the northern side there is a wall almost 1,000 meters (3,300 ft) high above the Logar Valley.

== History of climbing ==
The first recorded climb was by Franz Hohenwart in 1793 with a local from Kamniška Bistrica, although it is speculated that local hunters climbed the mountain before them. Planjava is now one of the most visited peaks in Slovenia.

== Routes ==
- 2 hrs from the Kamnik Saddle Lodge
- 1½ hrs from the Kocbek Lodge at Korošica
- 2½ hrs from the Kocbek Lodge at Korošica above Lučka Baba
- 5¼ hrs from the Klemenšek Cave Lodge at Ojstrica

== Climbing routes ==
=== Southeastern wall ===
- Memorial route Štefana Kukovca (VI/V, 350 meters or 1,150 feet)
- Route Humar - Škarja (V-/IV, 270 meters or 890 feet)
- Route Sobotna smer (V+/IV+, 210 meters or 690 feet)

=== Western wall ===
- Route Steber Planjave - smer X (IV, 400 meters or 1,300 feet)
- Route Svetelova (IV/III, 170 meters or 560 feet)
- Route Smer skozi rov in okno (IV/III-II, 300 meters or 980 feet)
- Route Kratkohlača (V-/IV, 310 meters or 1,020 feet)

=== Northern wall ===
- Route Gradišnik - Ogrin (V-/IV, 700 meters or 2,300 feet)
- Route Dular - Juvan v Glavi (VII, 200 meters or 660 feet)
