= Rinka Falls =

Waterfall in Slovenia

Coordinates: 46°22′11″N 14°38′39″E

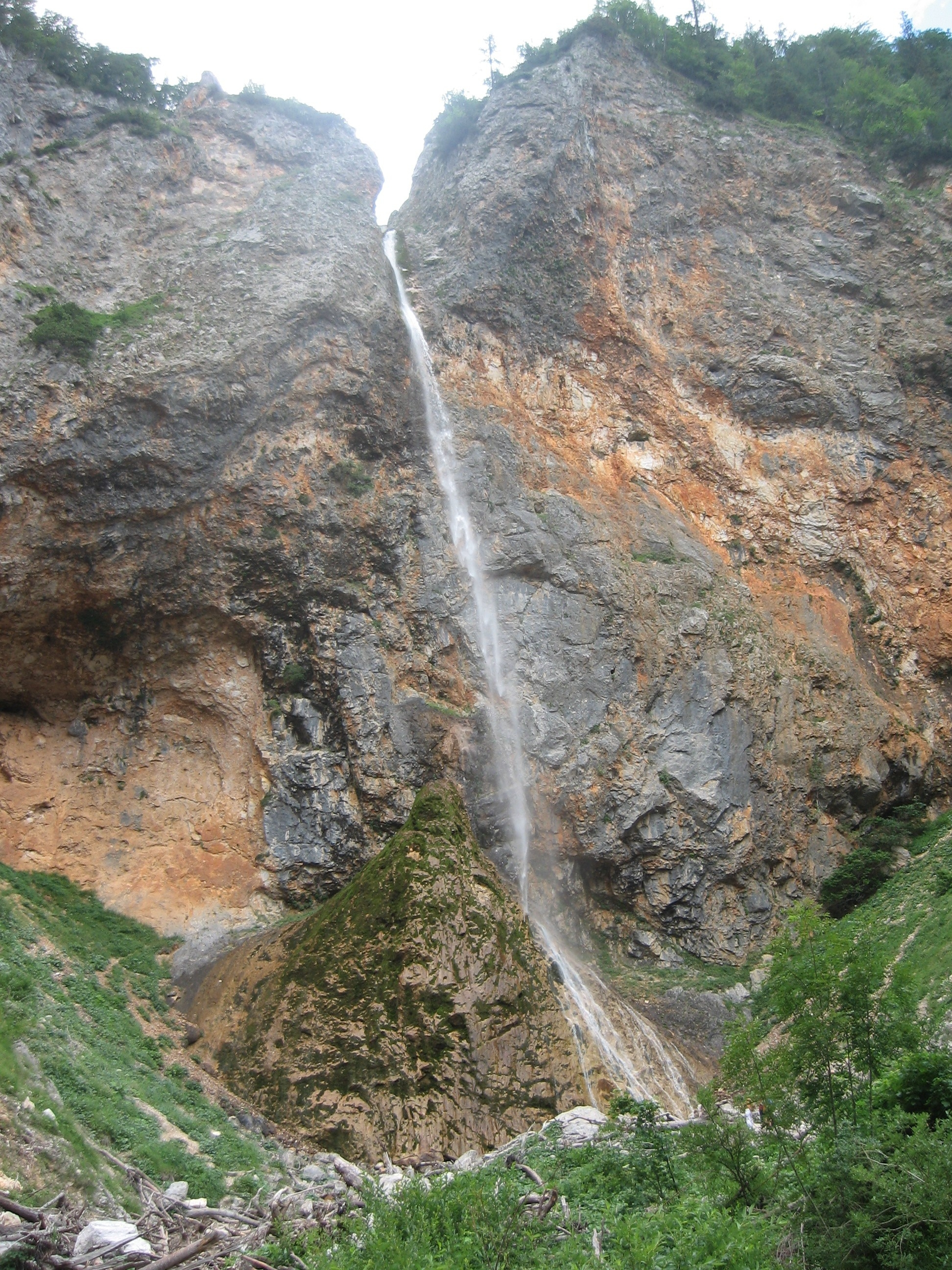
Rinka Falls (90-metre step)

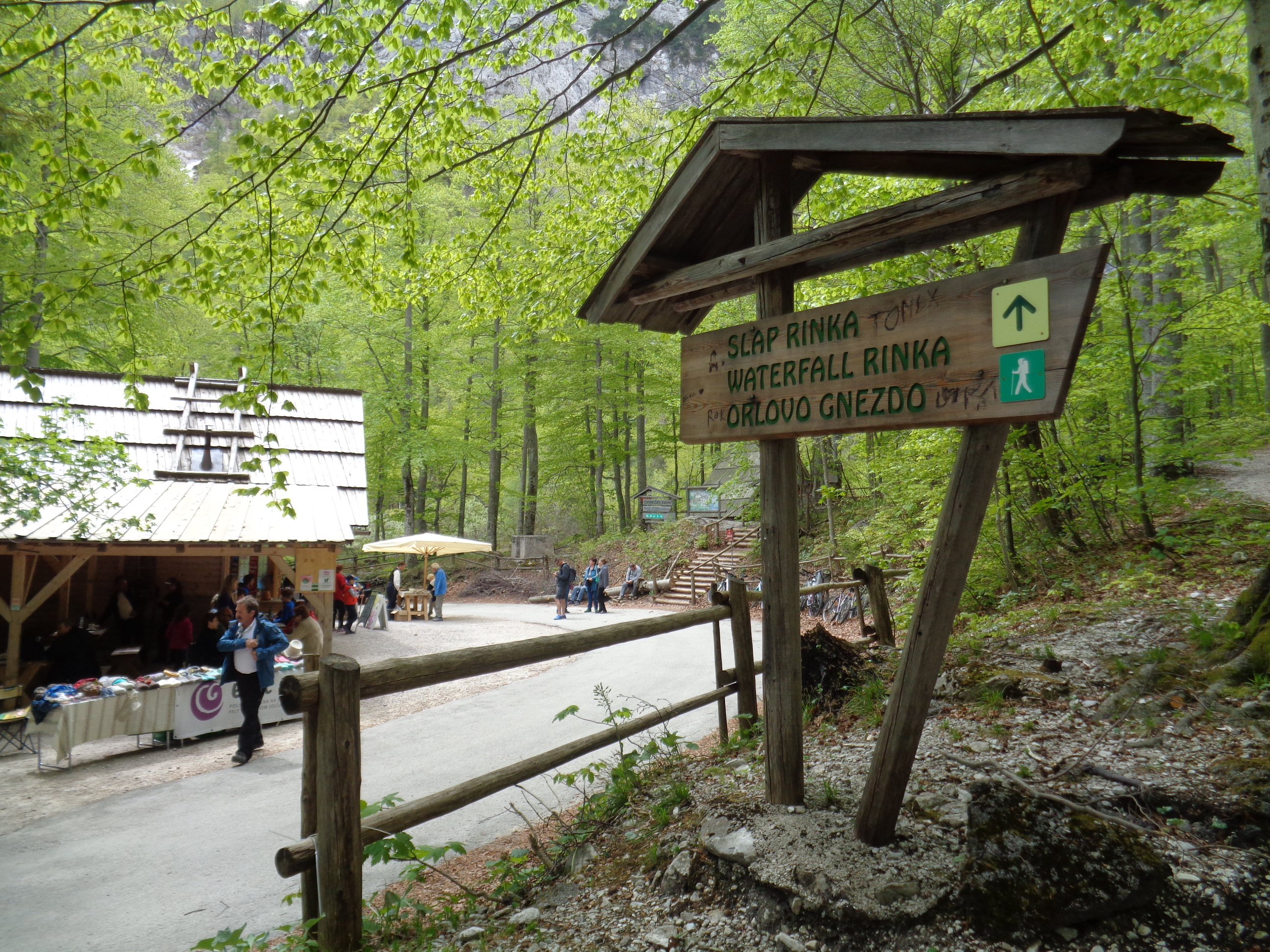
Rinka Falls guide sign

Rinka Falls (pronounced [ˈɾiːŋka]; Slovene: slap Rinka) is a waterfall in the Logar Valley, in the Municipality of Solčava in northern Slovenia. It is the source of the Savinja River. It has been proclaimed a natural heritage feature. Rinka Falls is one of the most beautiful and best-known waterfalls in Slovenia. It is also a popular tourist destination. With its drop of 105 metres (344 ft), it is the highest of the 20 waterfalls in the Logar Valley. The longest step has a length of 90 m (300 ft). It is visited in all seasons of the year. In the winter it is popular with ice-climbers.

There are also four mountains in the vicinity called Rinka: Carniola Mount Rinka (Kranjska Rinka; 2,453 m or 8,048 ft), Carinthia Mount Rinka (Koroška Rinka; 2,433 m or 7,982 ft), Styria Mount Rinka (Štajerska Rinka; 2,374 m or 7,789 ft), and Little Mount Rinka (Mala Rinka; 2,289 m or 7,510 ft).

The name Rinka comes from the Slovene common noun rinka 'ring, hoop, link of a chain'. It is a borrowing from German (cf. Ringel, Ringl, etc.) and was used to designate a rounded or ring-like topographic feature.

== See also ==
- List of waterfalls
