= Solčava =

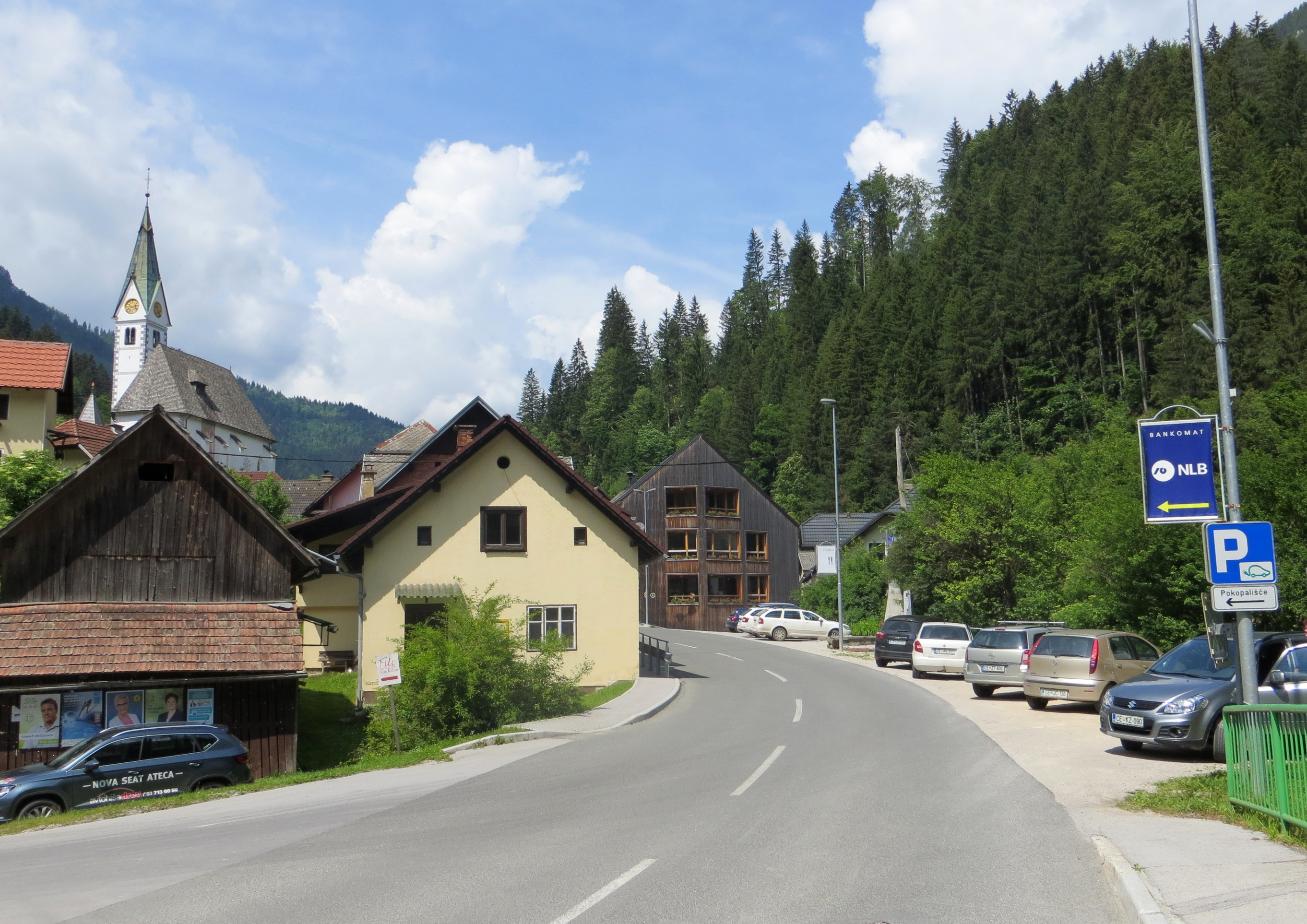

- Location in Slovenia
- Coordinates: 46°25′12.45″N 14°41′30.52″E
- Country: Slovenia
- Traditional region: Styria
- Statistical region: Savinja
- Municipality: Solčava

Area
  - Total: 12.1 km^{2} (4.7 sq mi)
- Elevation: 643.8 m (2,112 ft)

Population (2013)
  - Total: 208

Solčava (pronounced [sɔlˈtʃaːʋa]; German: Sulzbach) is a village in the Upper Savinja Valley in northern Slovenia close to the Austrian border. It is the largest settlement and the seat of the Municipality of Solčava. Traditionally it belonged to the region of Styria and is now included in the Savinja Statistical Region.

== Name ==
Solčava was attested in written sources as Sulçpach in 1268 (and as Sulzpach in 1306 and Sulzbach in 1491). In the local dialect, the village is called Žocpah, and in the 19th century its Slovene name was recorded as Žolcpah, Sušpach, and Solcpah—all based on the German name. The German name is a compound corresponding to Sulze 'mineral springs' + Bach 'creek', referring to the local geography. The modern Slovene name Solčava was artificially created in the 19th century from the German name; the first half of the name was modified to Šolč- to appear more Slovene, and the second half was replaced with -ava, a common suffix associated with streams.

== Church ==
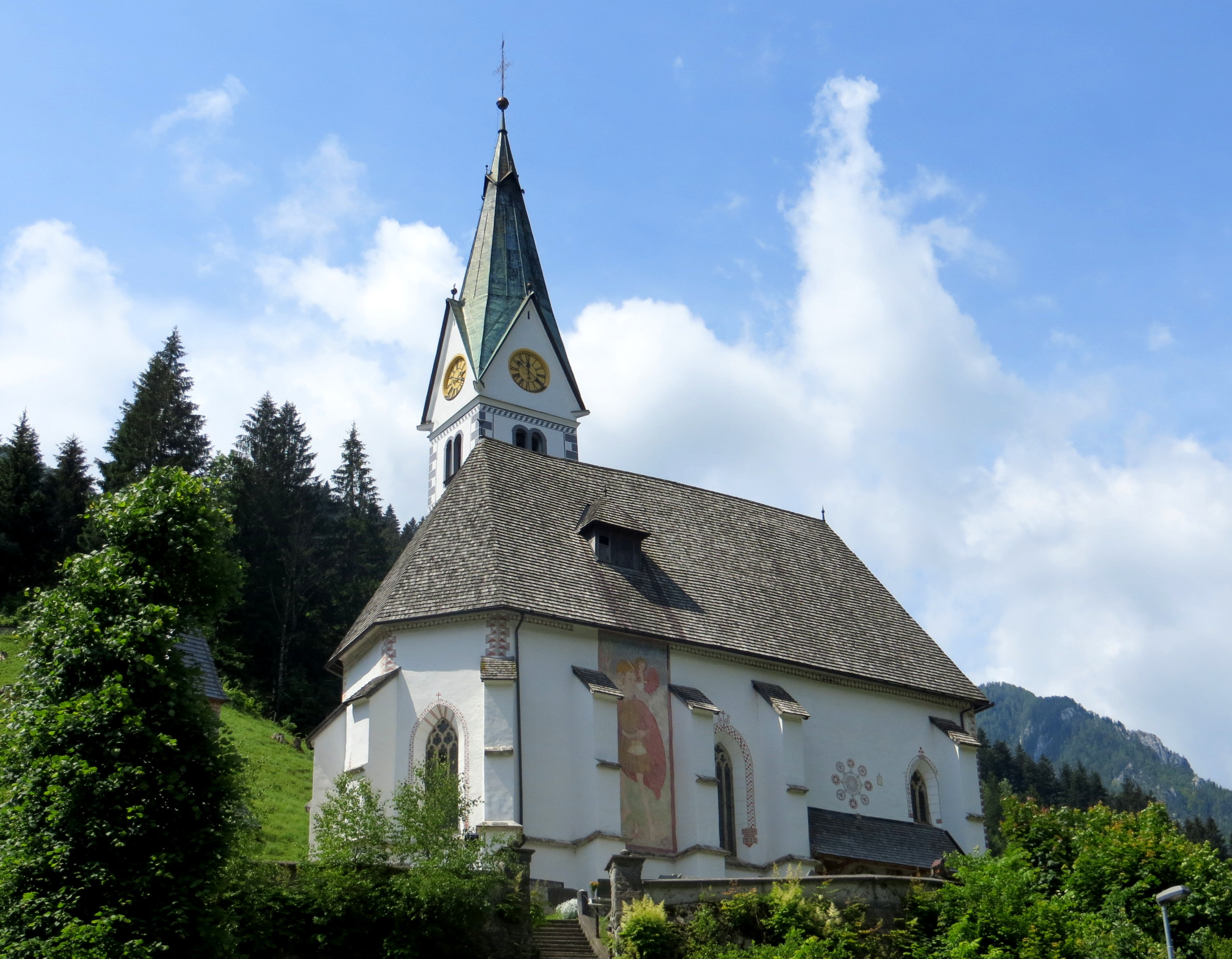
Mary of the Snows Church

The parish church in the settlement is dedicated to Mary of the Snows. It dates to the 15th century and contains a 13th-century statue of the Virgin Mary. It belongs to the Roman Catholic Diocese of Celje.
