= Kamnik–Savinja Alps =

Mountain range in Slovenia and Austria

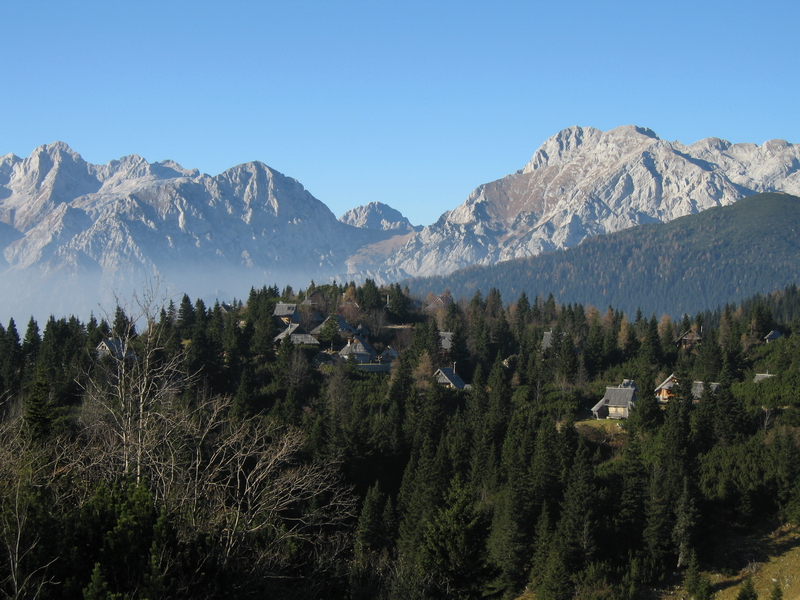
- View of the Kamnik Alps from the Big Pasture Plateau

Highest point
- Peak: Grintovec
- Elevation: 2,558 m (8,392 ft)
- Coordinates: 46°21′26″N 14°32′08″E

Geography
- Countries: Slovenia; Austria
- Parent range: Southern Limestone Alps; Carinthian-Slovenian Alps

The Kamnik–Savinja Alps (Slovene: Kamniško-Savinjske Alpe) are a mountain range of the Southern Limestone Alps. They lie in northern Slovenia, except for the northernmost part, which lies in Austria.

The western part of the range was named the Kamnik Alps (German: Steiner Alpen) in 1778 by the scientists Belsazar Hacquet and Franz Xaver von Wulfen, after the town of Kamnik (Stein) in the valley of the Kamnik Bistrica River. Its eastern part was named the Savinja Alps (Sanntaler Alpen) or Solčava Alps (Sulzbacher Alpen) by the mountaineer Johannes von Frischauf in 1875, after the settlement of Solčava (Sulzbach) and the main river, the upper Savinja (Sann).

== Geography ==
The Kamnik–Savinja Alps are located south of the Karawanks range at the border of Austria and Slovenia, stretching from the Sava River in the west to the Savinja in the east, where the adjacent Slovenian Prealps with the Pohorje range, the Celje Hills at the Dravinja River, as well as the Sava Hills are located. In the northwest, the valley of Vellach Creek (at 46°22′21″N 14°33′55″E) leading to Bad Vellach is the southernmost point of both the Austrian state of Carinthia and Austria as a whole.

The entire main chain is today part of Slovenia. Historically it formed the border between the Inner Austrian duchies of Carinthia, Styria, and Carniola. The tripoint was located at the Carinthia Mount Rinka (Slovene: Koroška Rinka).

There is also a small glacier below Mount Skuta, which is the easternmost glacier in the Southern Alps.

== Mountains and passes ==
The most important peaks are:

- Grintovec – 2,558 m (8,392 ft)
- Kočna – 2,540 m (8,333 ft)
- Skuta – 2,532 m (8,307 ft)
- Carinthia Mount Rinka – 2,433 m (7,982 ft)
- Planjava – 2,394 m (7,854 ft)
- Ojstrica – 2,350 m (7,710 ft)
- Brana – 2,253 m (7,392 ft)
- Kalce Ridge – 2,224 m (7,297 ft)
- Cold Mountain – 2,203 m (7,228 ft)
- Storžič – 2,132 m (6,995 ft)
- Krofička – 2,083 m (6,834 ft)

In total, 28 peaks surpass 2,000 m. The total area of the Slovene part is about 900 km^{2} (350 sq mi). About three-quarters of the area is covered with forest, and many of the higher peaks are bleak and rocky.

The most important passes are the Seebergsattel (Slovene: Jezersko sedlo) between Austrian Carinthia and Slovenia's Municipality of Jezersko, as well as the Pavlič Pass. On the Slovenian side, there is a skiing area, whereas tourism in the Vellach Valley focuses on health spas.

== Gallery ==
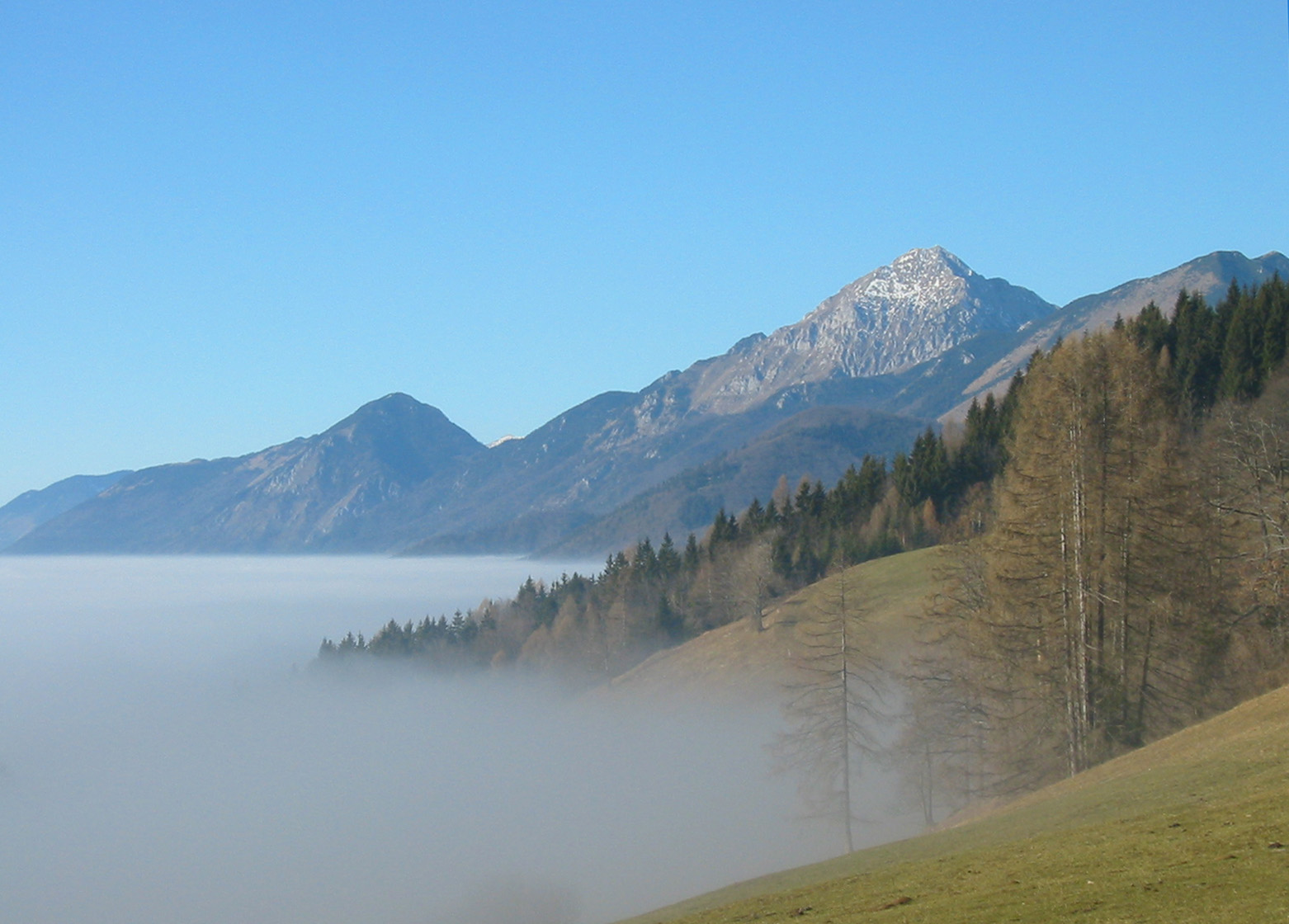
The Kamnik–Savinja Alps; the highest peak in the picture is Storžič.

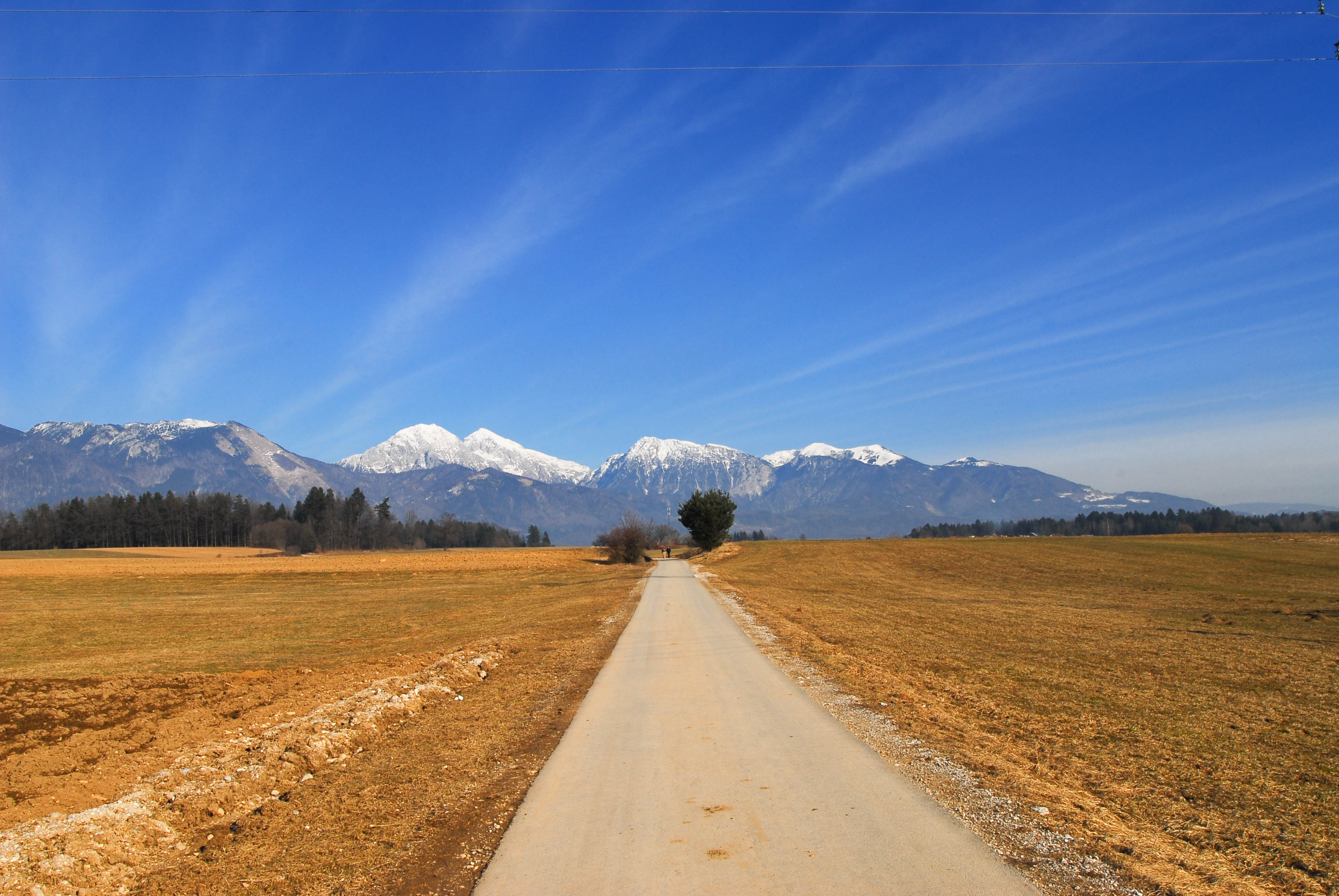
The Kamnik–Savinja Alps seen from Kranj

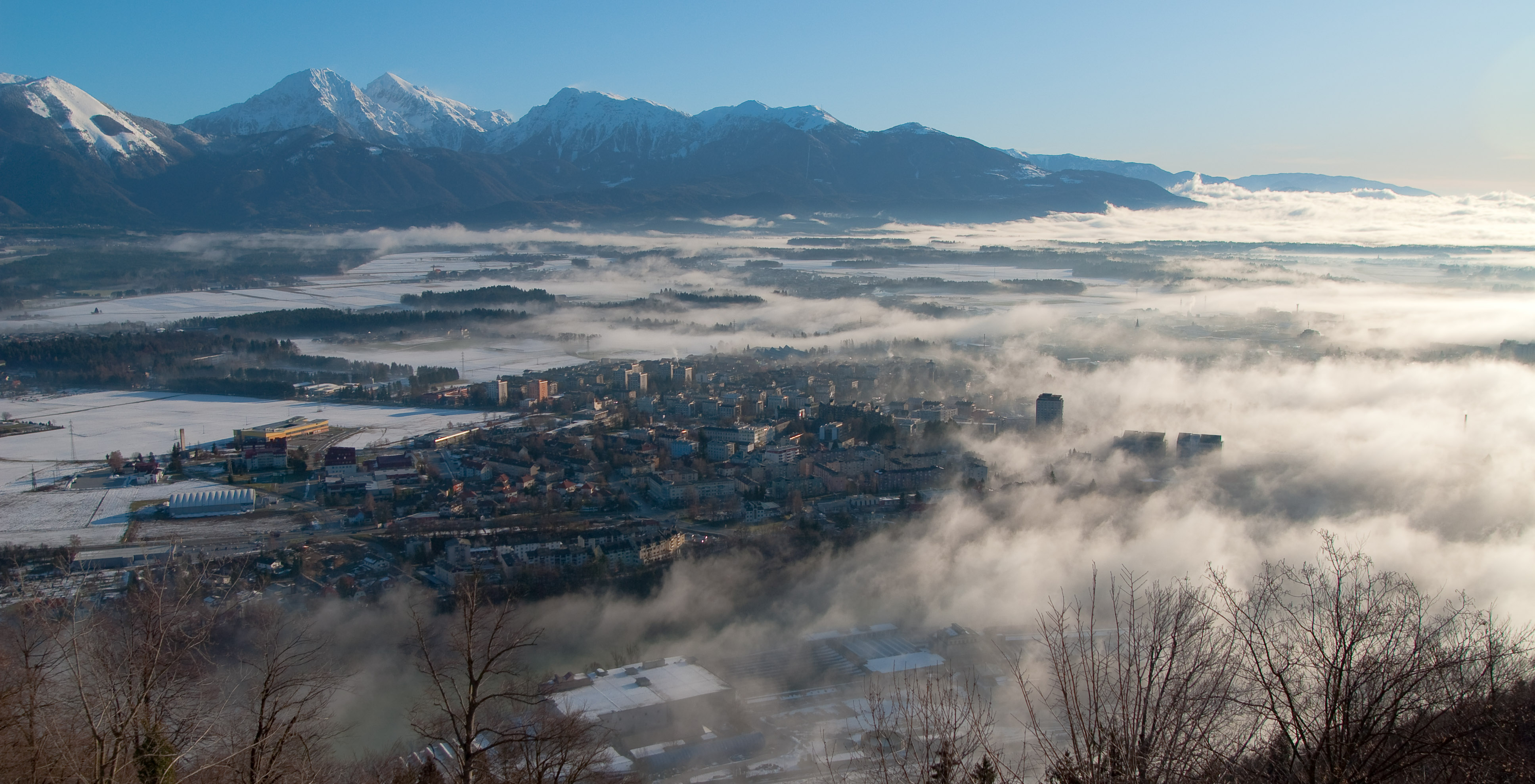
Kranj and the Kamnik–Savinja Alps in background

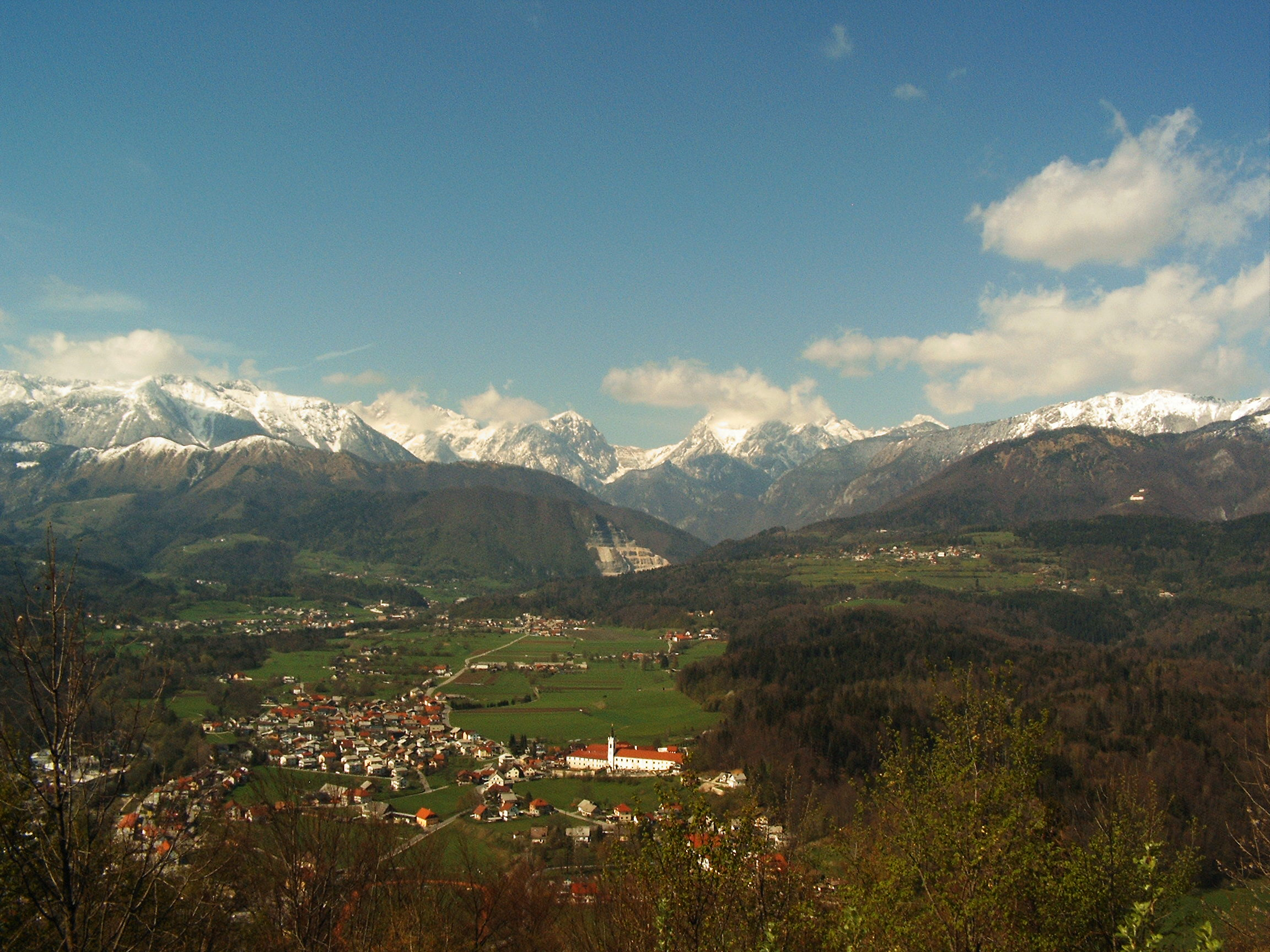
A portion of the Kamnik–Savinja Alps with the northern suburbs of Kamnik in the foreground

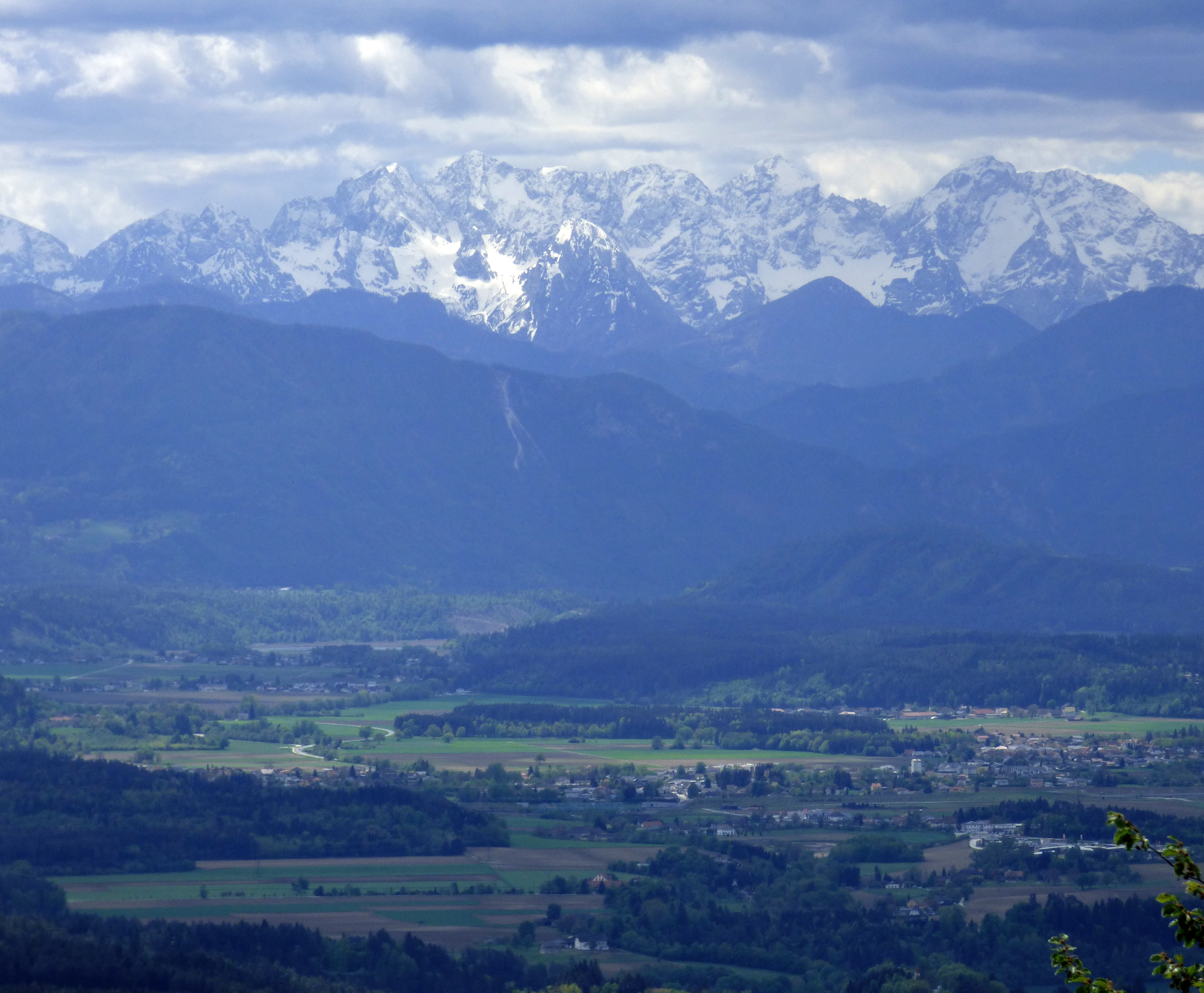
The Kamnik–Savinja Alps seen from Carinthia

== See also ==
- List of mountains in Austria
- List of mountains in Slovenia

== Bibliography ==
- Poljak, Željko (February 1959). "Kamniške ili Savinjske Alpe". Kazalo za "Hrvatski planinar" i "Naše planine" 1898—1958 (PDF). Naše planine (in Croatian). Vol. XI. p. 29. ISSN 0354-0650.
