= Logar Valley (Slovenia) =

Protected area in Slovenia

Logar Valley Landscape Park
- Krajinski park Logarska dolina
- IUCN category V (protected landscape/seascape)
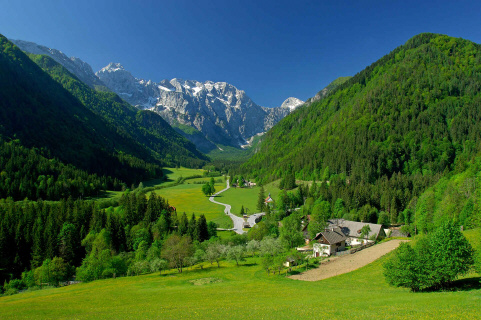
- Logar Valley

- Location within Slovenia
- Location: Slovenia
- Coordinates: 46°23′1.03″N 14°37′17.92″E
- Area: 24.75 km^{2} (9.56 sq mi)
- Established: 1987

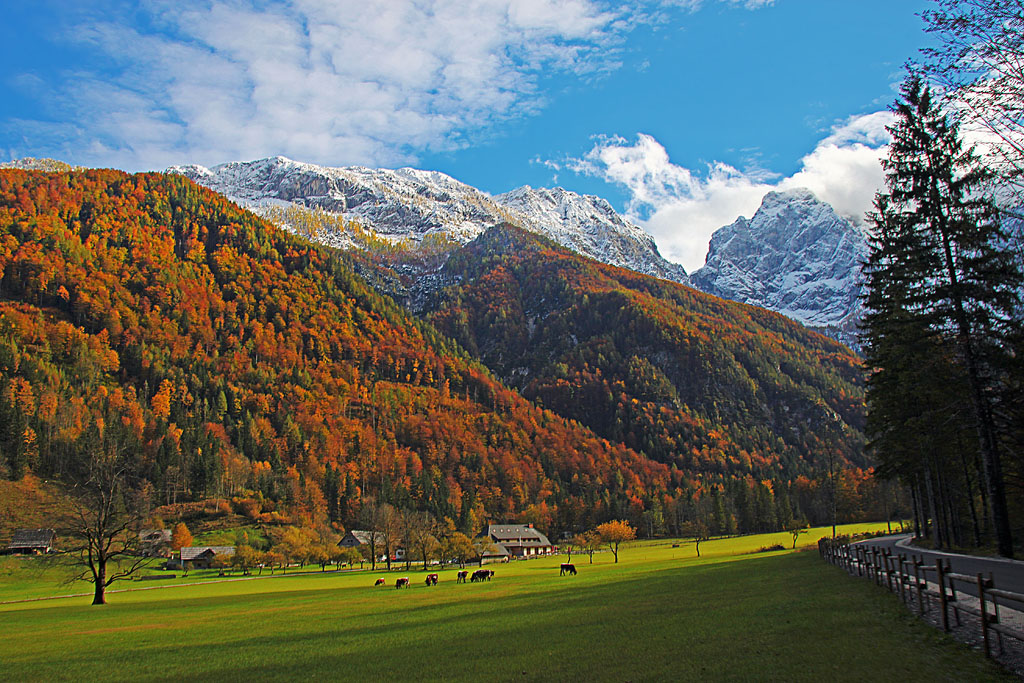
The Logar Valley in autumn

The Logar Valley (Slovene: Logarska dolina, Logarjeva dolina) is a valley in the Kamnik Alps, in the Municipality of Solčava, Slovenia. The Slovene name for the valley is of relatively recent coinage and is derived from the Logar Farm, which in turn is derived from log (literally, 'swampy meadow'). In 1987, the valley received protected status as a landscape park encompassing 24.75 square kilometres (9.56 sq mi).

== Geography ==
The Logar Valley is a typical U-shaped glacial valley. It is divided into three parts. The lower part is named Log, the middle part Plest or Plestje (it is a mostly wooded area), and the upper part Kot (literally 'cirque') or Ogradec (it is a wooded area with scree slopes). Altogether 35 people live on the isolated farmsteads in the valley.

=== Peaks ===
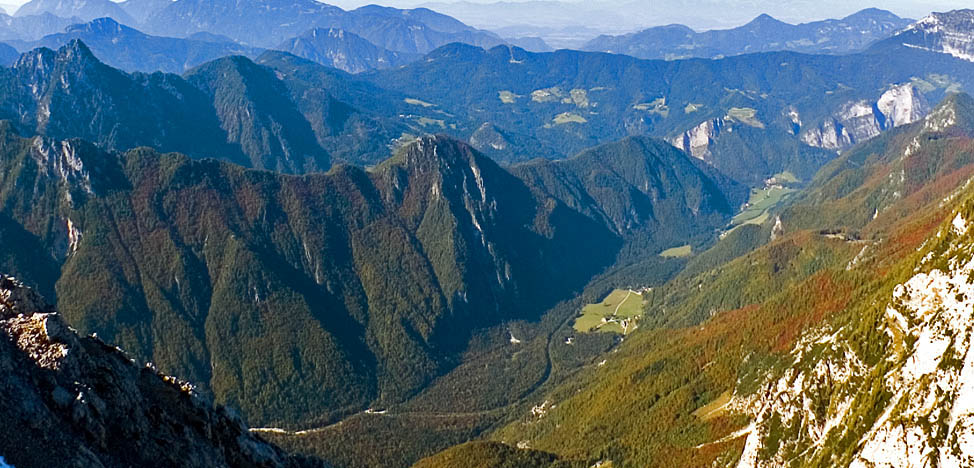
View from above

360° view on video

The Logar Valley is ringed by the following peaks: Strelovec (1,763 m or 5,784 ft), Krofička (2,083 m or 6,834 ft), Ojstrica (2,350 m or 7,710 ft), Lučka Baba (2,244 m or 7,362 ft), Planjava (2,394 m or 7,854 ft), Brana (2,252 m or 7,388 ft), Turska Gora (2,251 m or 7,385 ft), and Mrzla Gora (2,203 m or 7,228 ft). It terminates in a head wall beneath the Okrešelj Cirque, where the Savinja River starts at an ice-cold spring at an elevation of 1,280 meters and flows to Rinka Falls.

=== Climate ===
Although the Logar Valley is not particularly narrow (about 500 m at its narrowest), inversions are very common due to the influence of a northern anticyclone. Temperature distributions on the slopes are greatly influenced by differences between the sunny and shady areas, which is seen in different snow and ice conditions in the winter.

A walking path (2–3 hours) through the valley leads past a number of points of interest: the source of Black Creek (Črna), wooden logging chutes, a burl-covered ash tree, a charcoal-maker's hut, and other sights.
