= Storžič =

Slovenian Mountain

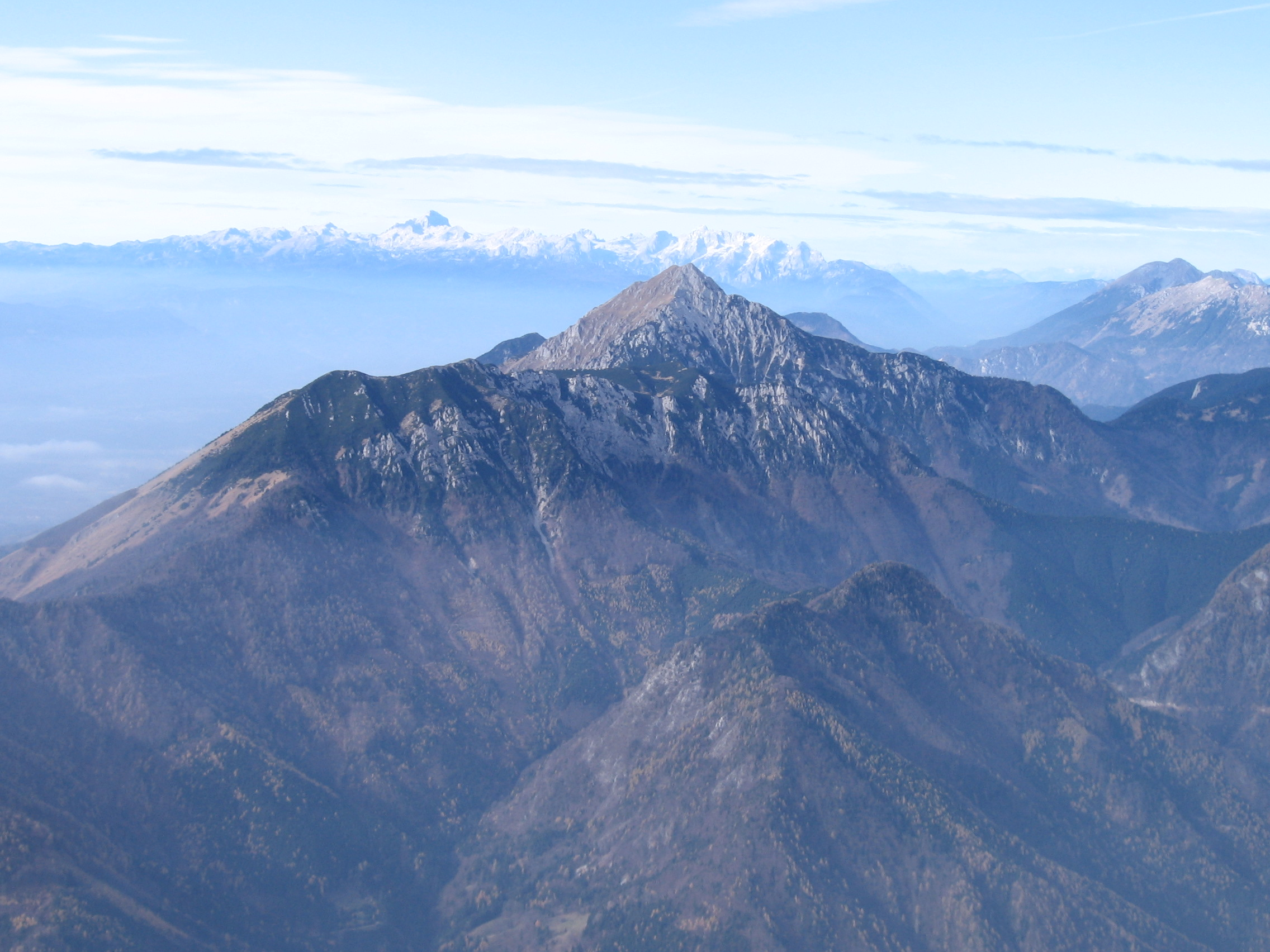
- View of Storžič from the Kalce Ridge

Highest point
- Elevation: 2,132 m (6,995 ft)
- Coordinates: 46°21′1.008″N 14°24′16.992″E

Geography
- Location within Slovenia
- Location: Slovenia
- Parent range: Kamnik–Savinja Alps

Storžič (pronounced [ˈstɔːɾʒitʃ]; 2,132 meters or 6,995 feet) is the highest mountain in the western part of the Kamnik–Savinja Alps. The top is a nicely shaped cone (Slovene: storž), from which the mountain got its name. Storžič has a good panoramic view. To the south are the Ljubljana Basin, Mount Krim, the Javornik Hills, Mount Snežnik, the Nanos Plateau, and the Škofja Loka Hills. To the west are the Julian Alps with prominent Mount Triglav. To the north are the Karawanks with Mount Stol, Mount Begunjščica, and Mount Košuta. To the east are the Jezersko Cirque, Mount Grintovec, the Kalce Ridge and Mount Krvavec.

== Starting points ==
- Bašelj (Preddvor)
- Gozd (Tržič)
- Lom pod Storžičem (Tržič)
- Preddvor
- Spodnje Jezersko (Jezersko)
- Trstenik (Kranj)

== Routes ==
- 4 h: from the Storžič Lodge (Slovene: Dom pod Storžičem, 1,123 meters or 3,684 feet), over Male Poljane via Psico
- 3½ h: from the Storžič Lodge (1,123 meters or 3,684 feet), over Škarjeve peči
- 3 h: from the Storžič Lodge (1,123 meters or 3,684 feet), through Žrelo, over Transverzala
- 1¾ h: from Planinski dom na Kališču hut (1,534 meters or 5,033 feet), over Transverzala
- 4½ h: from Zavetišče v Gozdu hut (891 meters or 2,923 feet), passing Mala Poljana
- 4½ h: from Spodnje Jezersko, over Bašelj Peak (Bašeljskiski vrh)
- 3½ h: from Trstenik, passing Velika Poljana or Javornik
- 3 h: from Bašelj, passing Koče nad Malo Pečjo over ridge on an unmarked route
