= Javornik Falls =

Waterfalls in Slovenia

Coordinates: 46°27′6.53″N 14°5′55.55″E

Javornik Falls (Slovene: Javorniški slapovi) is a series of three waterfalls near the settlement of Javorniški Rovt, part of the municipality of Jesenice in northern Slovenia.

The individual unnamed falls occur in the upper course of Javornik Creek, at an elevation of approximately 950 meters (3,120 ft) in the foothills of the Karawanks. They vary from 5 to 10 meters (16 to 33 ft) in height, and they are accessible to hikers from the Gajšek Trail (Slovene: Gajškova pot) leading from the Kres recreation area above the village of Koroška Bela to the Pristava Lodge.

== See also ==
- List of waterfalls
