= Storžič Lodge =

Coordinates: 46°21′33.64″N 14°23′23.24″E

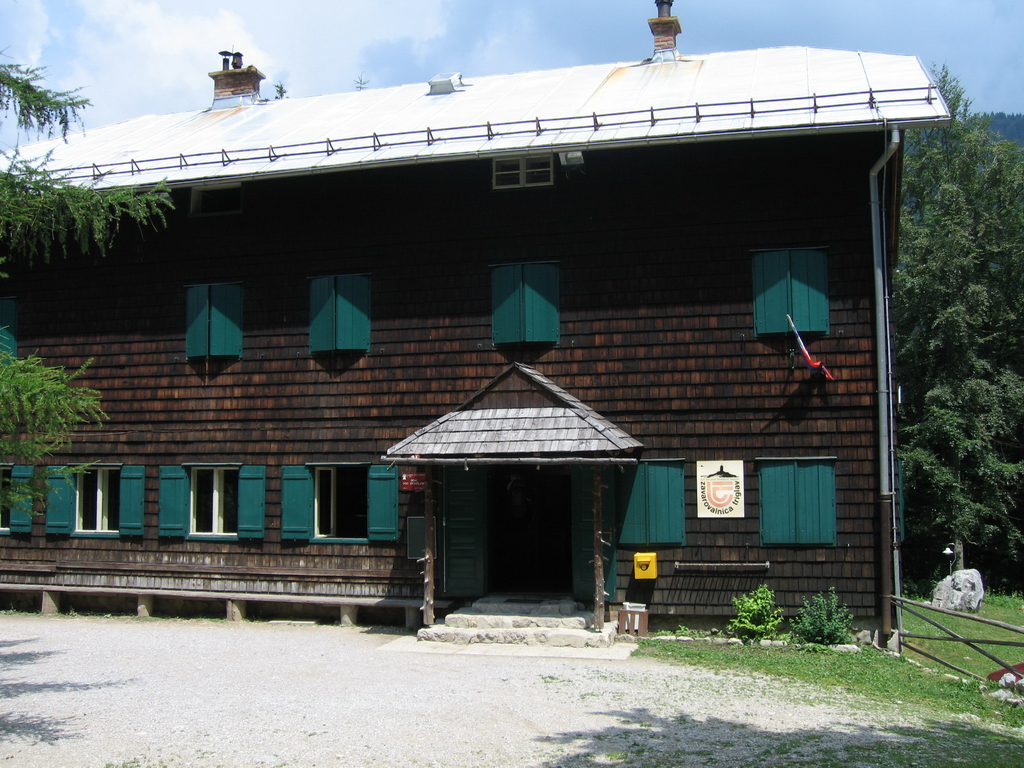
Storžič Lodge

The Storžič Lodge (Slovene: Dom pod Storžičem; 1,123 meters or 3,684 feet) is a mountain hostel in the upper part of the Lomščica Valley, near the Jesenje Pasture in northwestern Slovenia. The first lodge was built in 1938 and was called the Verbič Lodge (Verbičeva koča); it caught fire one year later. It burned in 1941 when German forces attacked the Storžič Battalion. The current brown shingled hut was built in 1951.

== Access ==
- 3h: from the town of Tržič through the village of Lom pod Storžičem
- 3½h: from the Forest Shelter (Zavetišče v Gozdu; 891 m), via the Little Poljana Pasture (Mala Poljana; 1325 m)
- 3½-4h: from Spodnje Jezersko, via the Podstoržec Pasture

== Nearby lodges ==
- 3h: to the Mount Križe Lodge (Koča na Kriški gori; 1471 m), via Fat Peak (Tolsti vrh; 1715 m), via the Slovenian Mountain Hiking Trail
- 2½h: to the Kališče Lodge (Planinski dom na Kališču; 1534 m), via the Javornik Pass (Javorniški preval) and the Bašelj Pass (Bašeljski preval)

== Nearby mountains ==
- 3h: Stegovnik (1692 m), via Mount Javornik
- 3½h: Storžič (2132 m), via the Psice Ridge
- 3½h: Storžič (2132 m), via Škar Crag (Slovene: Škarjeva peč), on the Slovenian Mountain Hiking Trail
- 3h: Storžič (2132 m), via the Žrelo Gorge
