= Rovt =

Rovt is a Slovene toponym that may refer to:

== Places ==
- Javorniški Rovt, a settlement in the Municipality of Jesenice in northwestern Slovenia
- Laški Rovt, a settlement in the Municipality of Bohinj in northwestern Slovenia
- Nemški Rovt, a settlement in the Municipality of Bohinj in northwestern Slovenia
- Plavški Rovt, a settlement in the Municipality of Jesenice in northwestern Slovenia
- Rovt, Dobrova–Polhov Gradec, a settlement in the Municipality of Dobrova–Polhov Gradec in western Slovenia
- Rovt pod Menino, a settlement in the Municipality of Nazarje in northern central Slovenia

== People ==
- Alexander Rovt, an American billionaire businessman and real estate investor
