= Zois Lodge at Kokra Saddle =

- (Cojzova koča na Kokrskem sedlu)
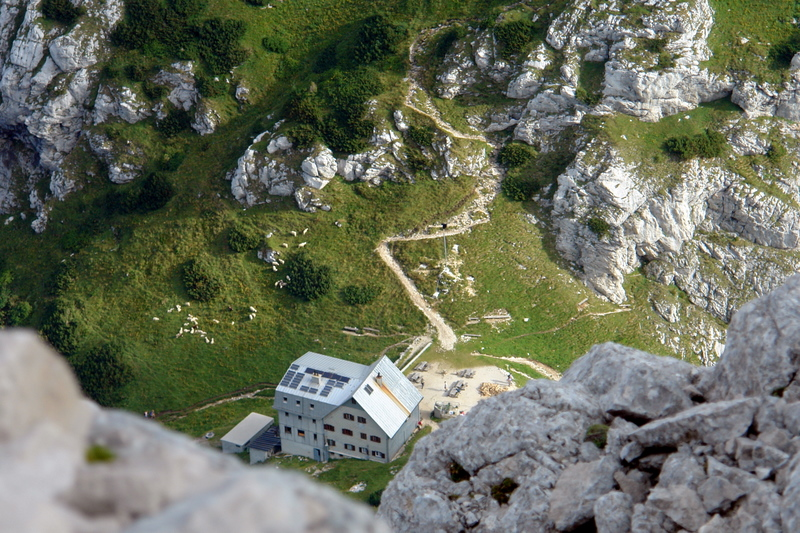

Highest point
- Elevation: 1,793 m (5,883 ft)
- Coordinates: 46°20′39.48″N 14°32′48.840″E

Geography
- Location within Slovenia
- Location: Slovenia
- Parent range: Kamnik-Savinja Alps

The Zois Lodge at Kokra Saddle (Slovene: Cojzova koča na Kokrskem sedlu; 1,793 meters or 5,883 feet) is a mountain hostel that stands on Kokra Saddle (Kokrsko sedlo), part of the Kamnik–Savinja Alps. It is named after the brothers Karl Zois (1756–1799), and Sigmund Zois (1747–1819).

The first lodge was built from wood in 1897 by the Austrian hiking club. After World War I it had to be rebuilt.

In 1966, it was expanded and connected via a ropeway conveyor to Konec in the Kamnik Bistrica Valley. The lodge operates from the start of June through the middle of October. The lodge offers Slovenian drinks, such as Cockta, and traditional dishes such as bujta repa.

== Starting points ==
- 3½ h: from the Kamnik Bistrica Valley (601 m) (the cableway on the map is only for freight, not people)
- 2½ h: from the Suhadolnik Farm in the Kokra Valley (896 m)

== Neighbouring lodges ==
- 5 h: to the Czech Lodge at Spodnje Ravni (Češka koča na Spodnjih Ravneh; 1,542 m) via the Mlinar Saddle (Slovene: Mlinarsko sedlo)
- 5 h: to the Czech Lodge at Spodnje Ravni (Češka koča na Spodnjih Ravneh; 1,542 m) via the Dolci Notch Pass (Dolška škrbina)
- 5½ h: to the Frischauf Lodge at Okrešelj (Frischaufov dom na Okrešlju; 1,396 m) via Turski Žleb Ravine
- 6 h: to the Kamnik Saddle Lodge (Koča na Kamniškem sedlu; 1,864 m) via the Sleme Pass and Mount Turska (Turska gora)
- 5 h: to the Gospinec Lodge (Planinski dom na Gospincu; 1,491 m) via the Kalce Plateau (planota Kalce)
- 6 h: to the Gospinec Lodge (Planinski dom na Gospincu; 1,491 m) via the Kalce Ridge (Kalški greben)

== Neighbouring mountains ==
- 2 h: Grintovec (2,558 m)
- 1 h: Mount Kalce (Kalška gora, 2,047 m)
- 2½ h: Kalce Ridge (Kalški greben, 2,224 m)
- 3½ h: Kočna (2,540 m)
- 3½ h: Skuta (2,532 m)

== See also ==
- Slovenian Mountain Hiking Trail
