= Czech Lodge at Spodnje Ravni =

Mountain hostel in Slovenia

- (Češka koča na Spodnjih Ravneh)
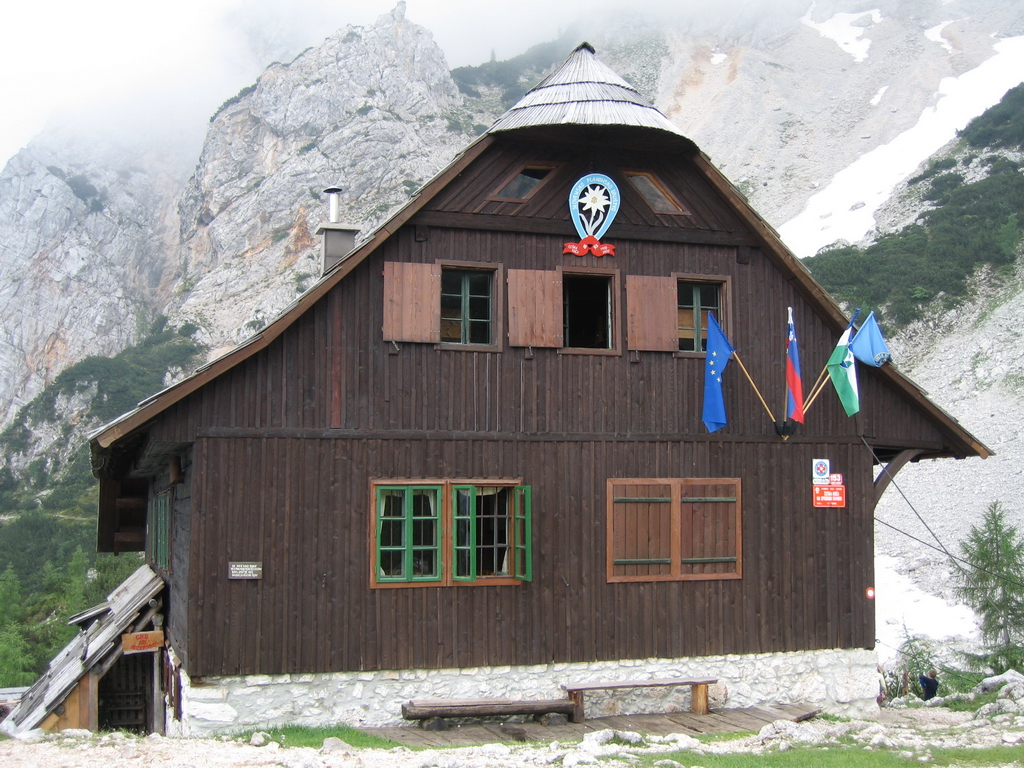

Highest point
- Elevation: 1,542 m (5,059 ft)
- Coordinates: 46°22′12.720″N 14°32′27.240″E

Geography
- Location within Slovenia
- Location: Slovenia
- Parent range: Kamnik–Savinja Alps

The Czech Lodge at Spodnje Ravni (Slovene: Češka koča na Spodnjih Ravneh; 1,542 meters or 5,059 feet) is a mountain hostel that stands on the Spodnje Ravni Cirque above the Ravne Combe (Ravenska kočna) in Slovenia, below the northern part of Mount Grintovec and the Long Ridge (Dolgi hrbet). It is named after the Czechs from Prague who built it in 1900. In the 1970s, it was renovated, but the Czech architectural style remained. It is managed by the Jezersko Mountaineering Club (PD Jezersko). Its groundskeeper was for 40 years Andrej Karničar, then for 10 ten years Tone Karničar, and since July 2015 Karmen Karničar.

== Starting points ==
- 2 h: from Zgornje Jezersko Spodnji kraj
- 2.30 h: from Zgornje Jezersko Zgornji kraj lower cargo cable station
- 2.30 h: from Zgornje Jezersko Zgornji kraj), passing the Štular Pasture (Slovene: Štularjeva planina)

== Neighbouring lodges ==
- 4.30 h: to the Zois Lodge at Kokra Saddle (Cojzova koča na Kokrskem sedlu) (1793 m), via Dolci Notch Pass Dolška škrbina
- 4 h: to the Zois Lodge at Kokra Saddle (1793 m), via the Mlinar Saddle (Mlinarsko sedlo)
- 1 h: to the Kranj Lodge at Ledine (Kranjska koča na Ledinah) (1700 m)

== Neighbouring mountains ==
- 3.30 h: Grintovec (2558 m), via the Mlinar Saddle
- 4 h: Grintovec (2558 m), via the Dolci Notch Pass
- 3.30 h: Kočna (2540 m), via the Kremžar Route
- 3.30 h: Skuta (2532 m), via the Long Ridge
- 4 h: Skuta (2532 m), via the Long Ridge

== See also ==
- Slovenian Mountain Hiking Trail

== Zunanje povezave ==
- Photos, Routes & Descriptions
- on www.pzs.si
