= Zgornje Jezersko =

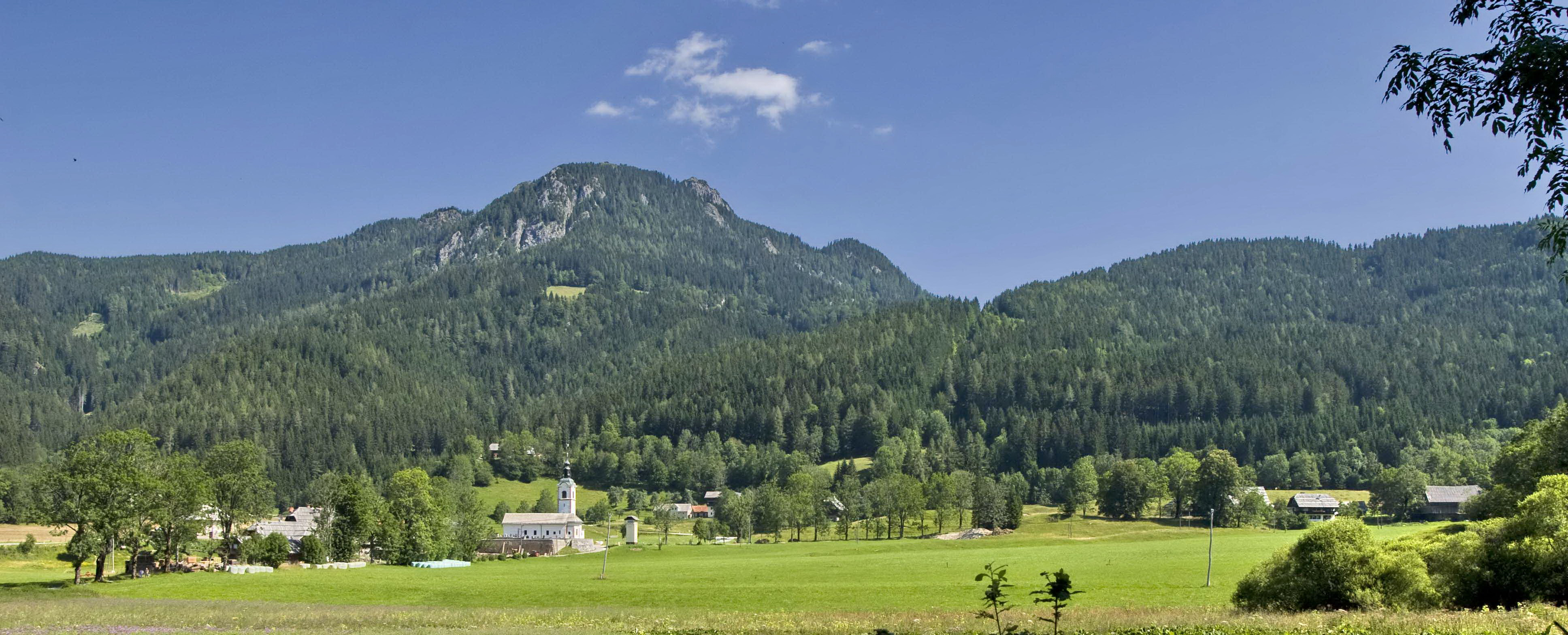

- Flag Coat of arms

- Location in Slovenia
- Coordinates: 46°23′42.19″N 14°29′47.9″E
- Country: Slovenia
- Traditional region: Carinthia
- Statistical region: Upper Carniola
- Municipality: Jezersko

Area
  - Total: 40.97 km^{2} (15.82 sq mi)
- Elevation: 889.3 m (2,918 ft)

Population (2002)
  - Total: 558

Zgornje Jezersko (pronounced [ˈzɡoːɾnjɛ jɛˈzɛːɾskɔ], literally 'Upper Jezersko'; German: Ober-Seeland) is a settlement and administrative centre of the Municipality of Jezersko in northern Slovenia. It is part of the traditional Slovenian Carinthia region and the Upper Carniola Statistical Region.

== Geographical features ==
The settlement is located in a high valley between the Karawanks mountain range in the north and the Kamnik–Savinja Alps in the south. The road from Kranj runs through the valley further up to Seeberg Saddle and the border with Austria.

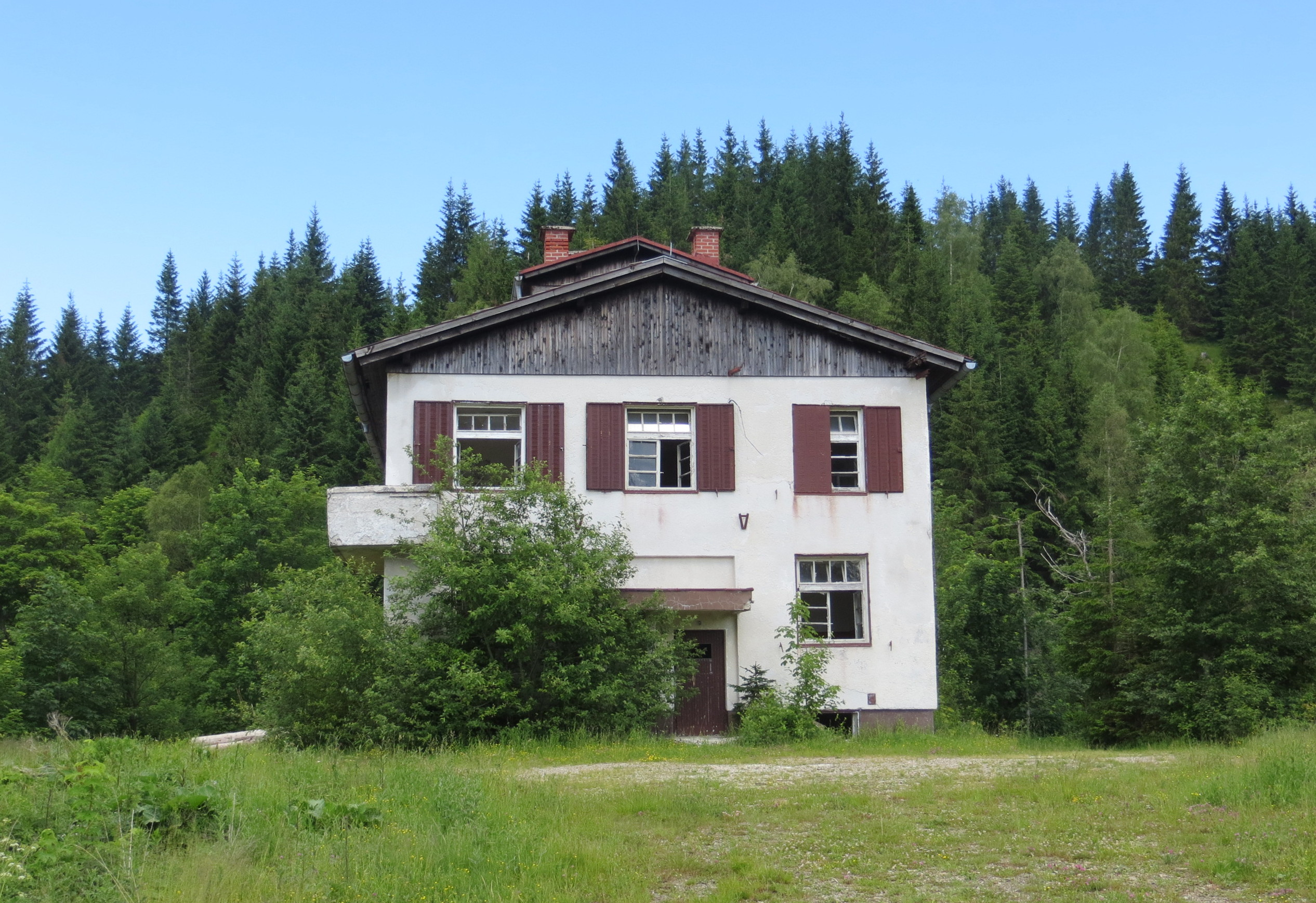
Anko Pasture

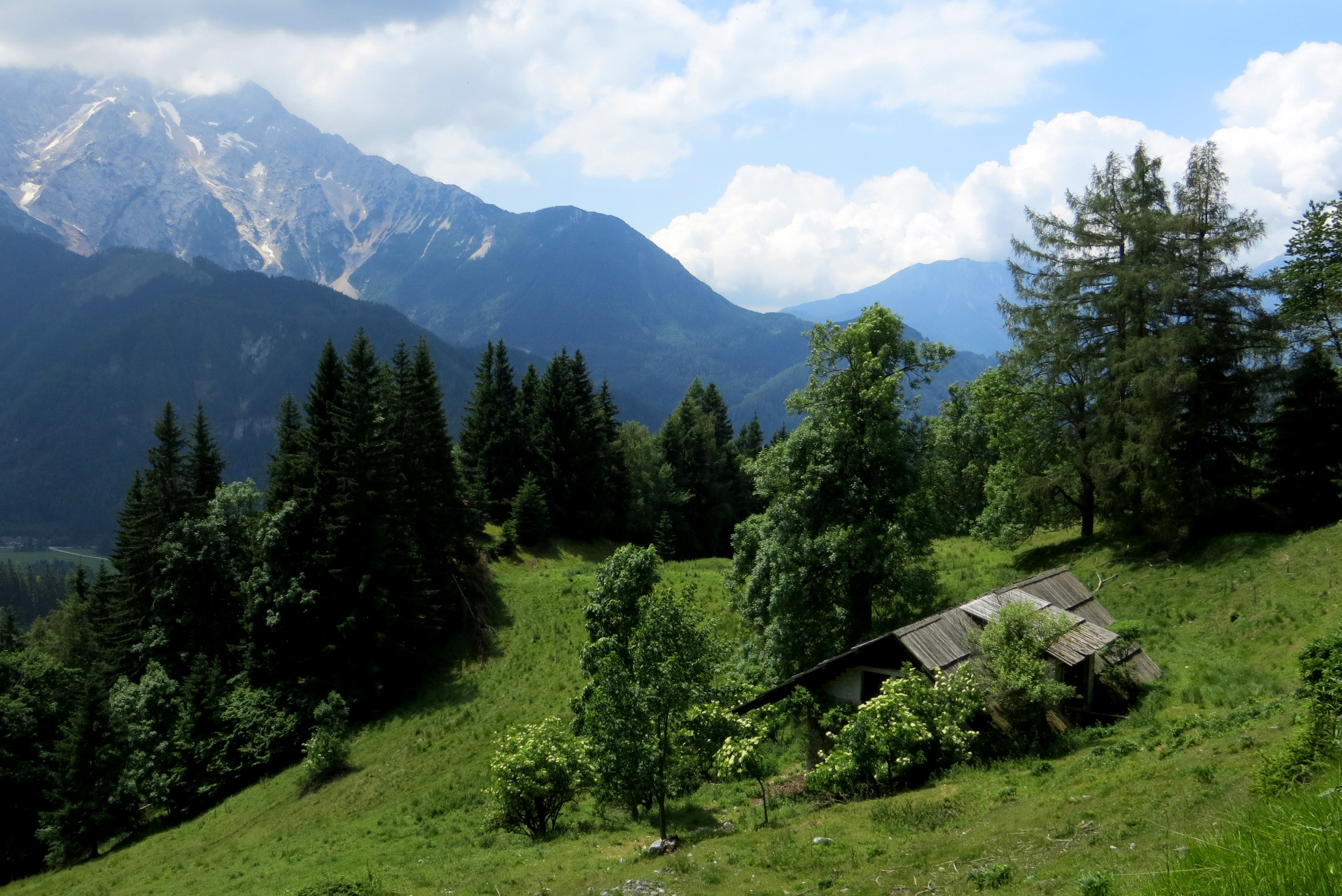
Rakež Pasture

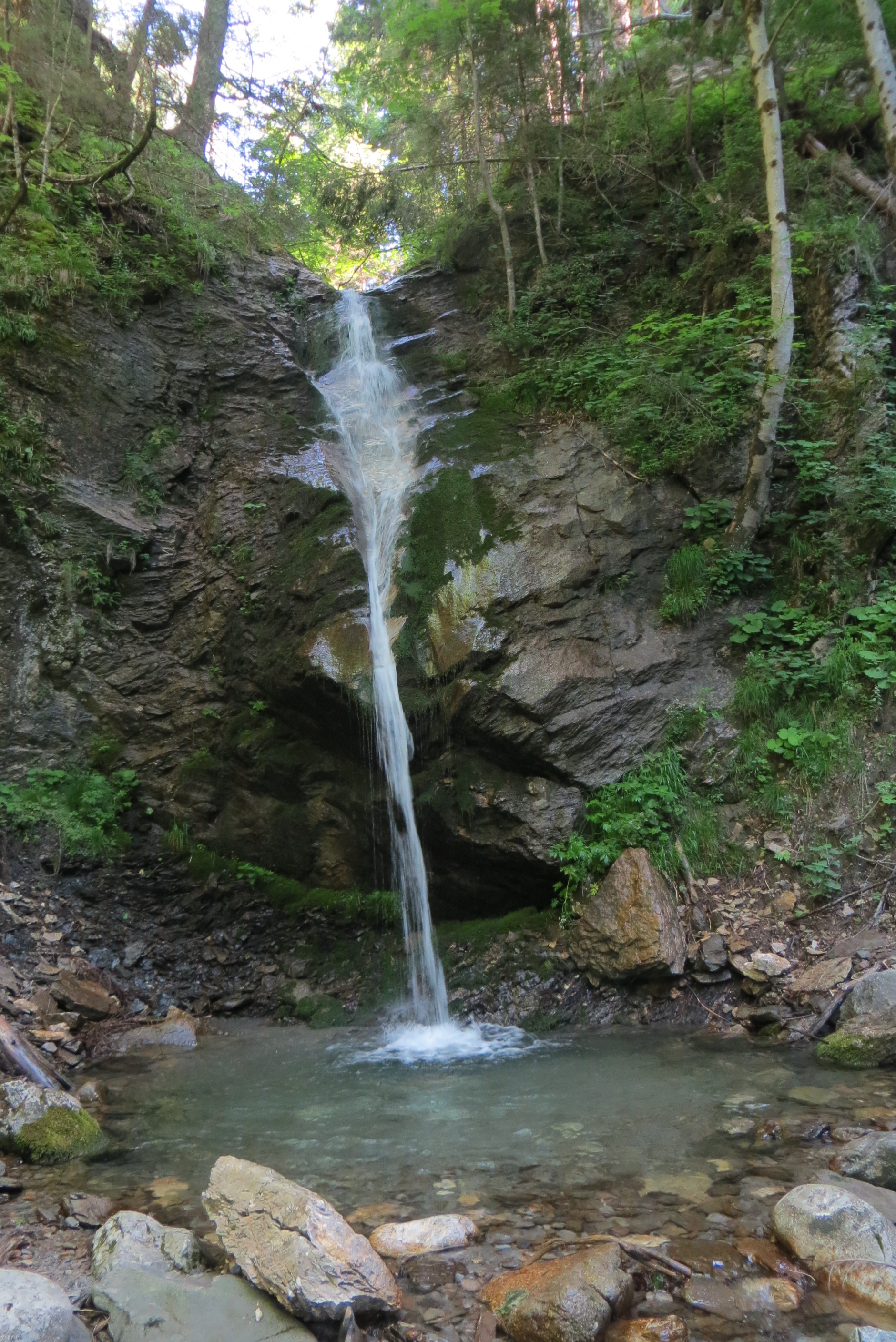
Anko Falls

Jezernica Creek, a tributary of the Kokra River, flows through Zgornje Jezersko. Other major geographical features in or bordering the settlement's territory include Lake Planšar (Planšarsko jezero), the Ravne Cirque (Ravenska kočna), the Makek Cirque (Makekova kočna), and Mount Kočna (2,540 meters or 8,330 feet), as well as mounts Grintovec, Skuta, and Storžič to the south. Mount Roblek (1,374 meters or 4,508 feet) stands due north of the village and is surrounded by the Roblek Pasture (Slovene: Roblekova planina, German: Roblekalm), the Anko Pasture (Ankova planina) with an abandoned Yugoslav border post, and the Rakež Pasture (Rakeževa planina). Anko Falls (Ankova slapova) is located immediately south of the Anko Pasture.

== Churches ==
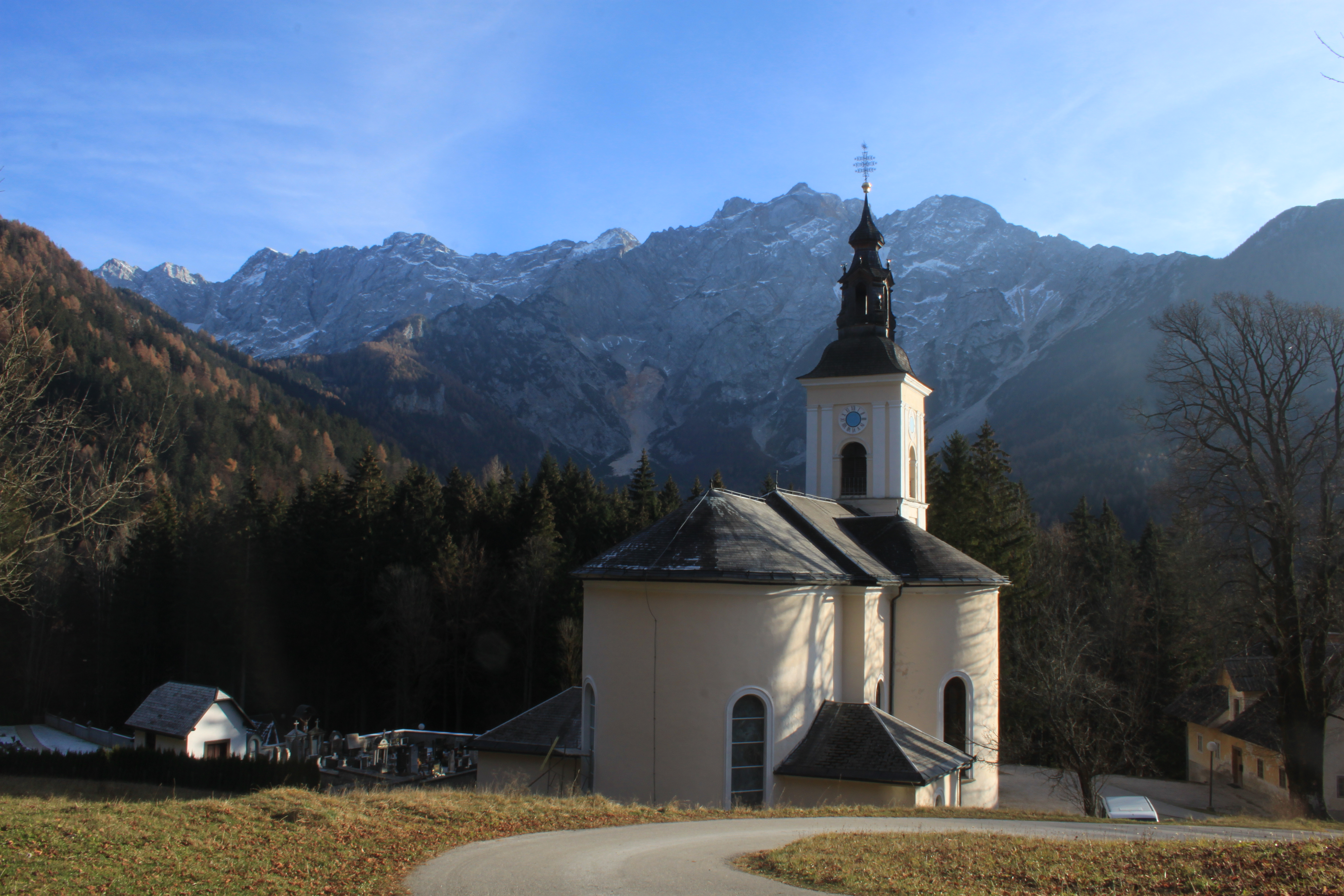
St Oswald's Church

There are three churches in the settlement. Two of them, including the parish church, are dedicated to Saint Oswald. The older one, a chapel of ease above the village, was built around 1320. The larger 19th-century church is on the northern outskirts of the main settlement.

St. Andrew's Church, another chapel of ease, is located in the hamlet of Ravne, northeast of the main settlement.
