= Kalce Ridge =

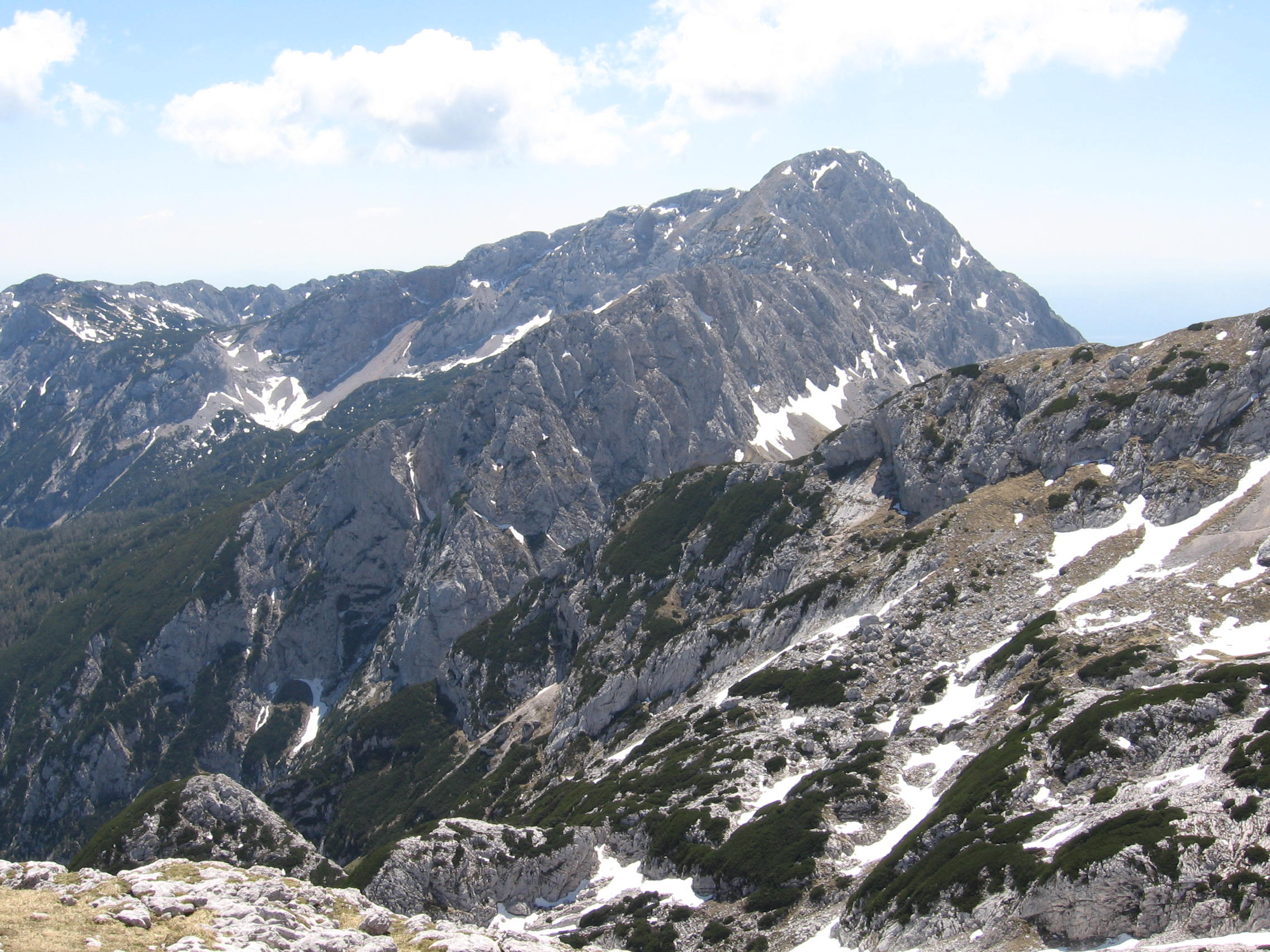
- Kalce Ridge

Highest point
- Elevation: 2,224 m (7,297 ft)
- Coordinates: 46°19′56″N 14°32′19″E

Naming
- Native name: Kalški greben (Slovene)

Geography
- Location within Slovenia
- Location: northern Slovenia
- Parent range: Kamnik–Savinja Alps

The Kalce Ridge (Slovene: Kalški greben) is a 2,224-metre-high (7,297 ft) mountain of the Kamnik–Savinja Alps in northern Slovenia. It is the highest peak of the Krvavec Group.

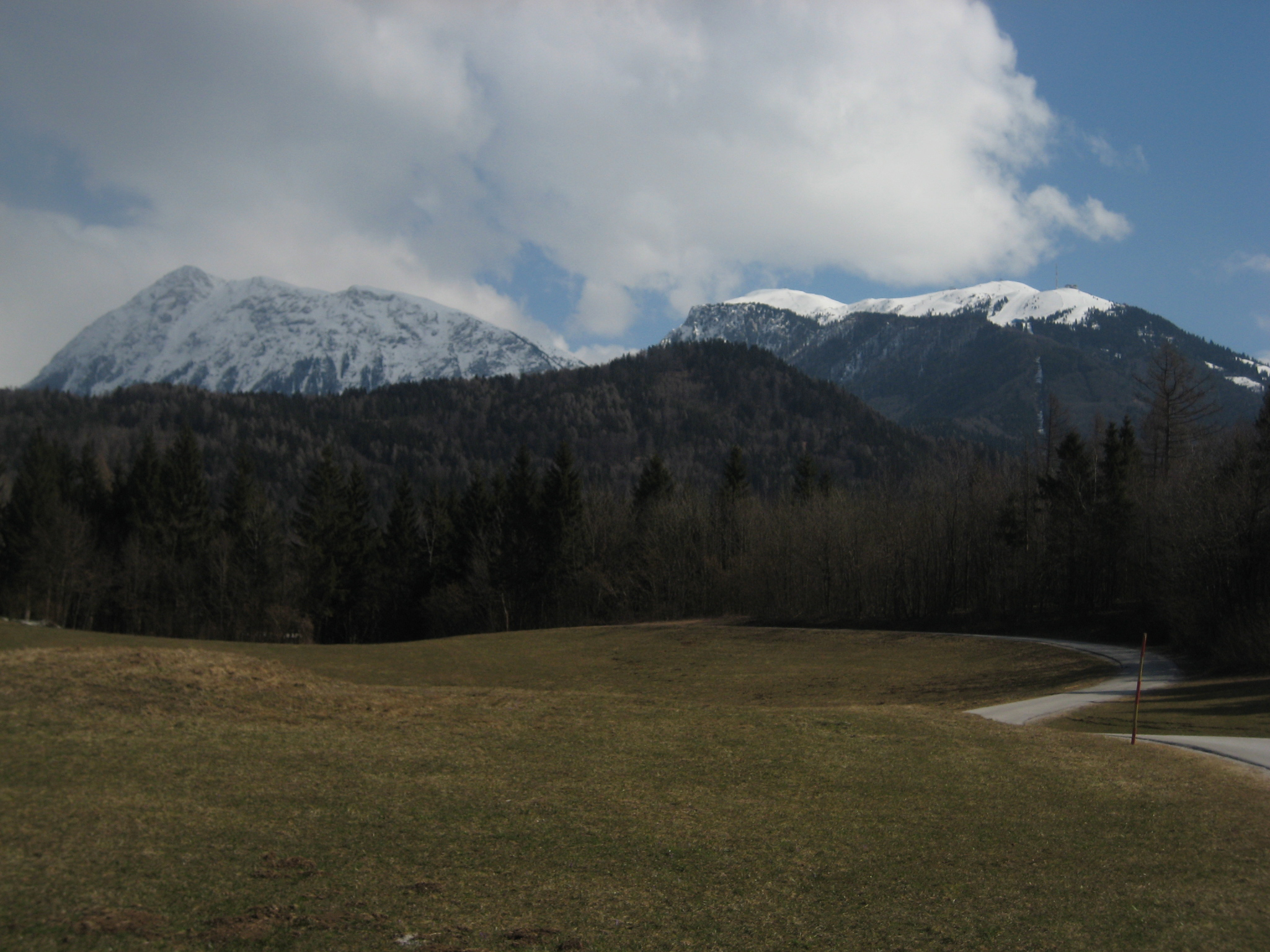
The Kalce Ridge (left) and Krvavec (right)

== Routes ==
- 3½hrs from Gospinc Lodge (Planinski dom na Gospincu; 1,491 m or 4,892 ft) through Long Field Pasture (planina Dolga njiva).
- 4hrs from Gospinc Lodge (1,491 m or 4,892 ft), over Koren Peak (Vrh Korena; 1,999 m or 6,558 ft).
- 2½hrs from Zois Lodge at Kokra Saddle (Cojzova koča na Kokrskem sedlu; 1,793 m or 5,883 ft).

== Views from the summit ==
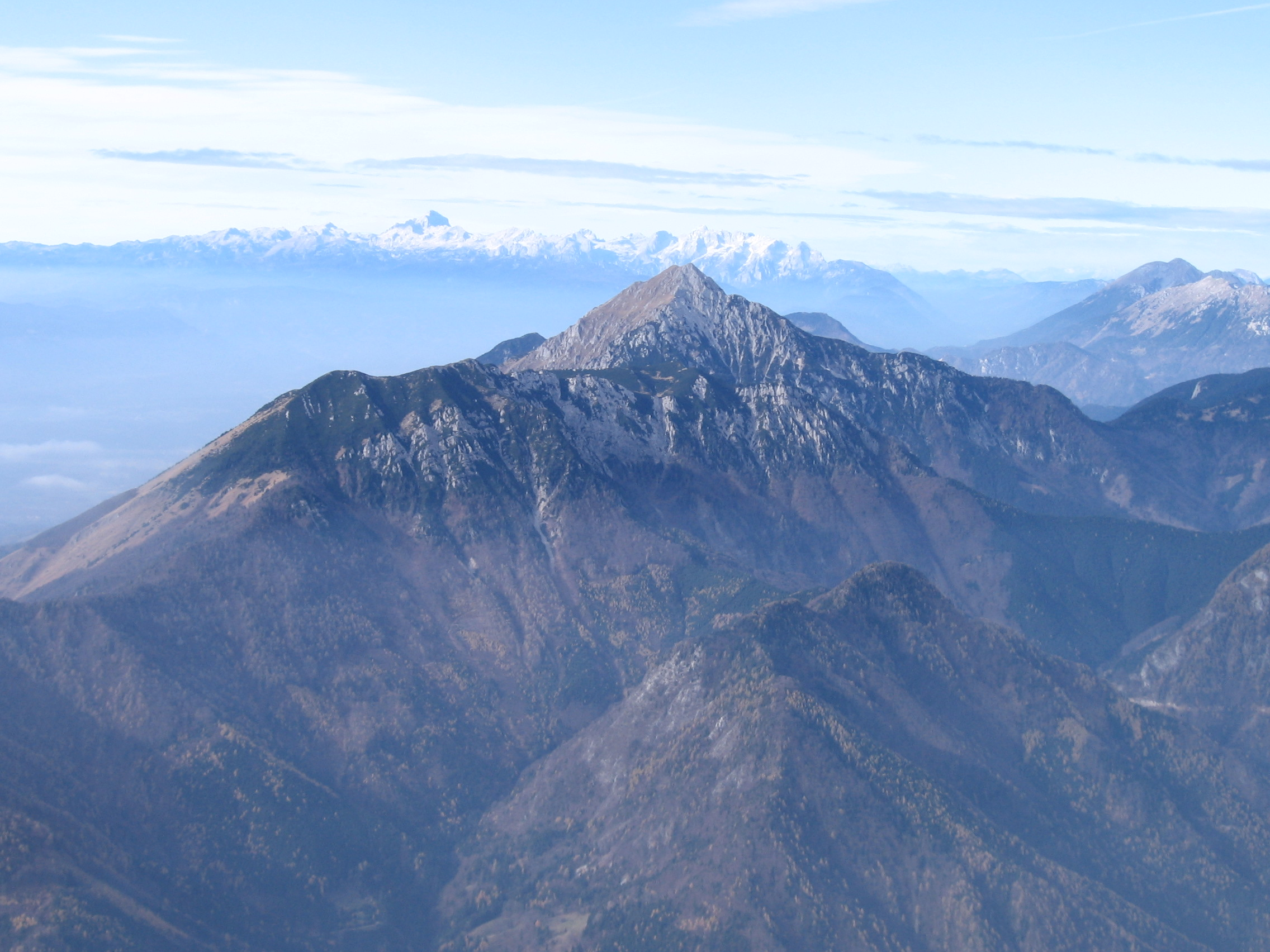
Storžič

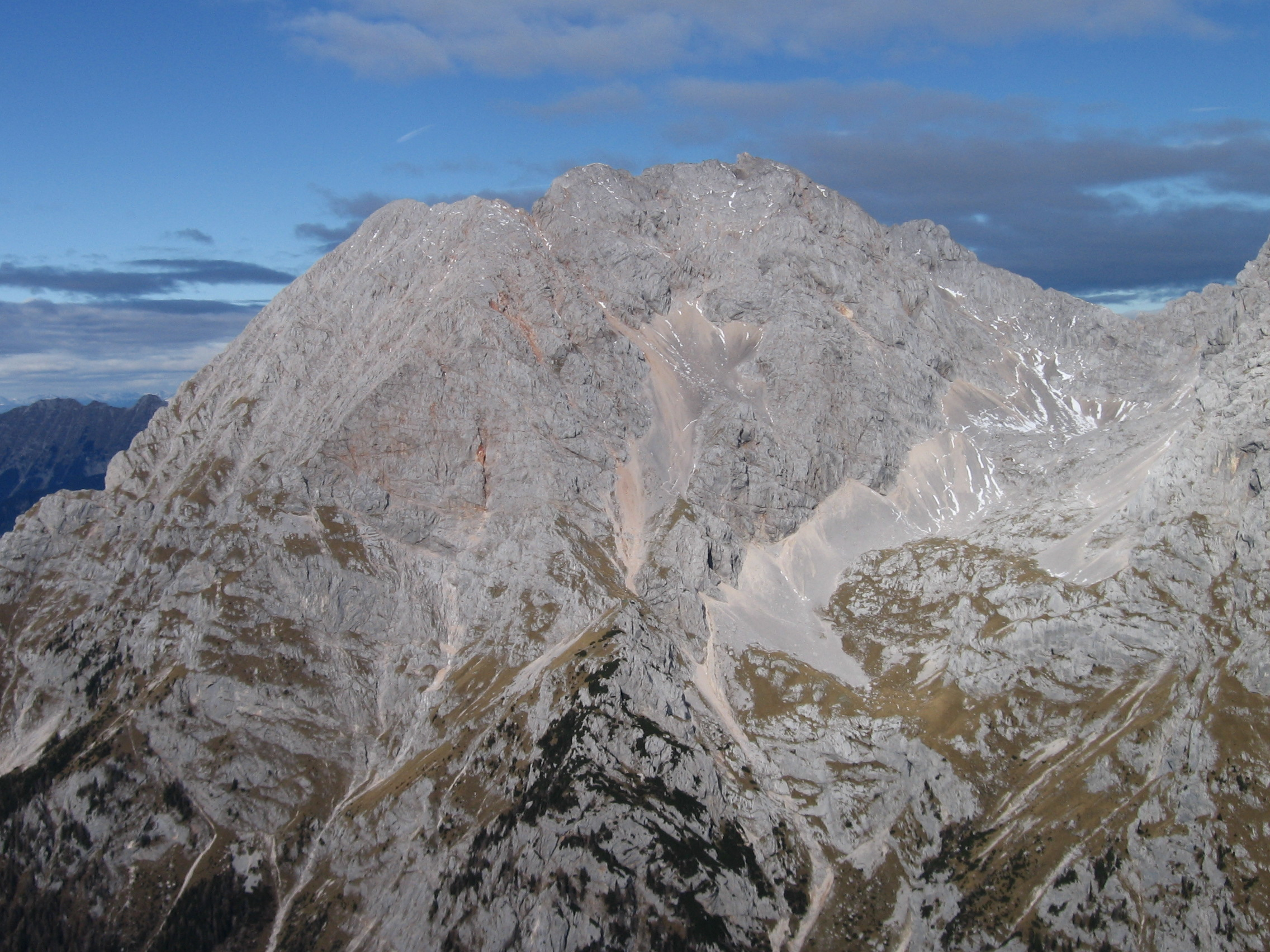
Kočna

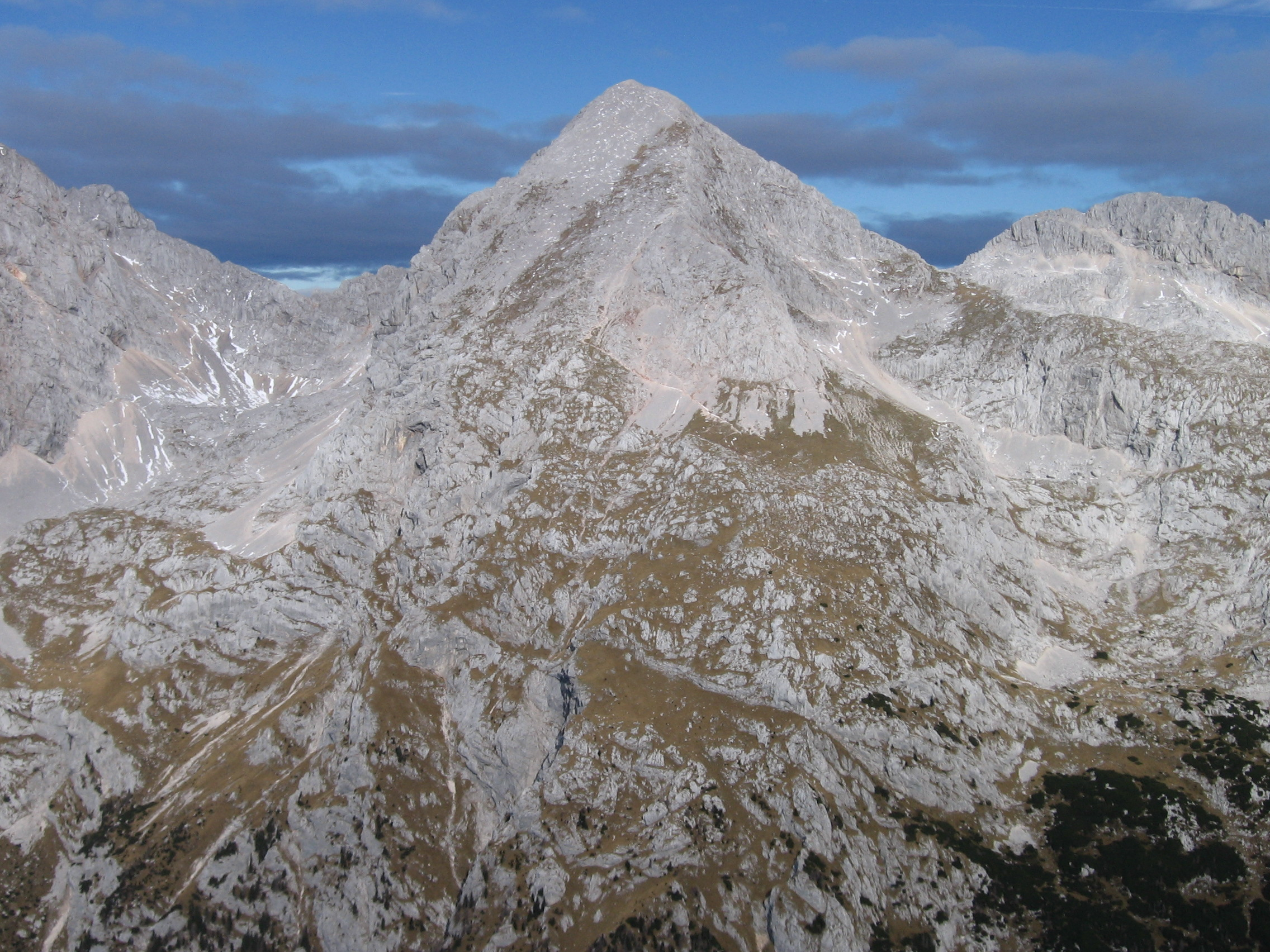
Grintovec

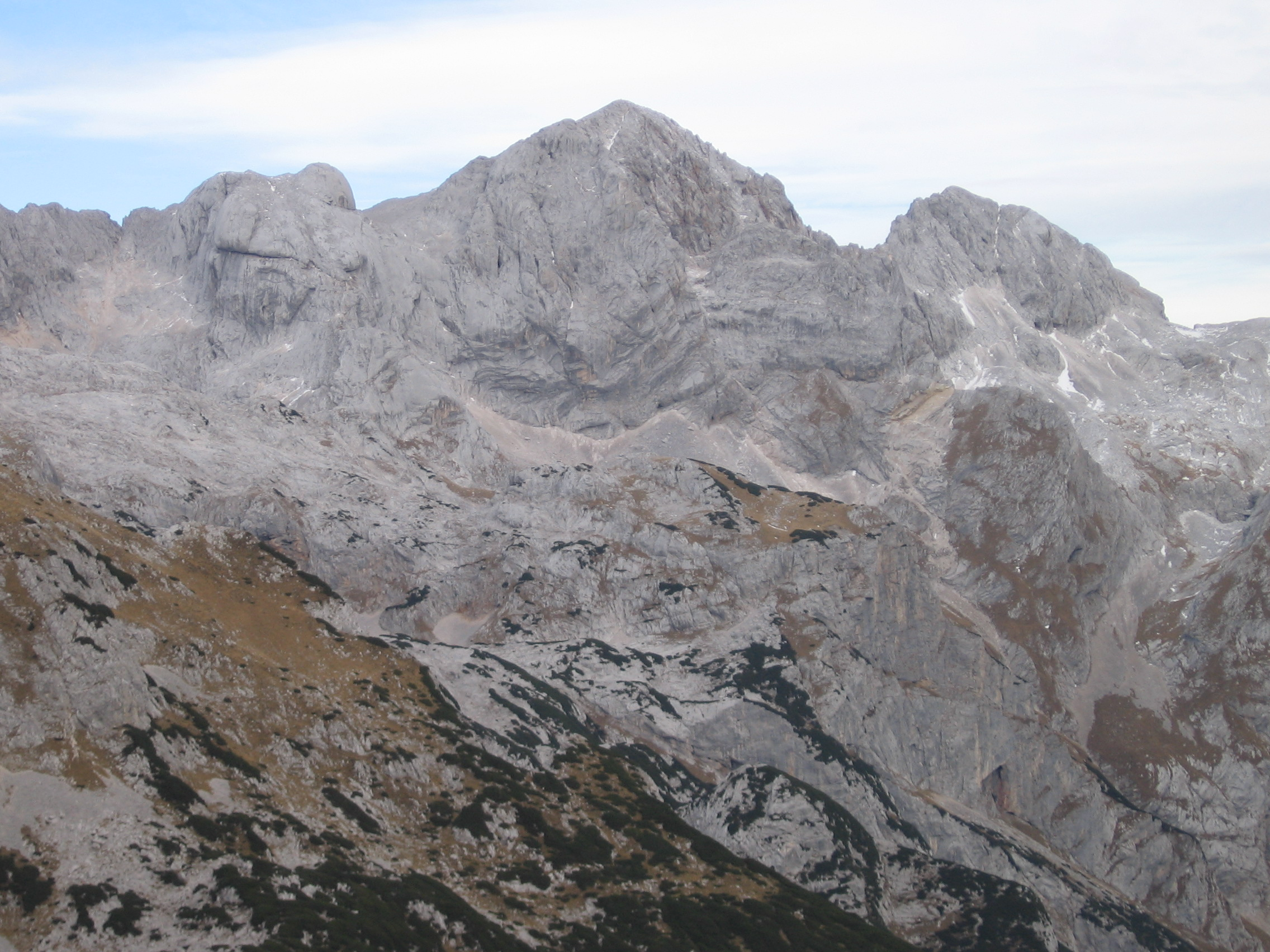
Skuta

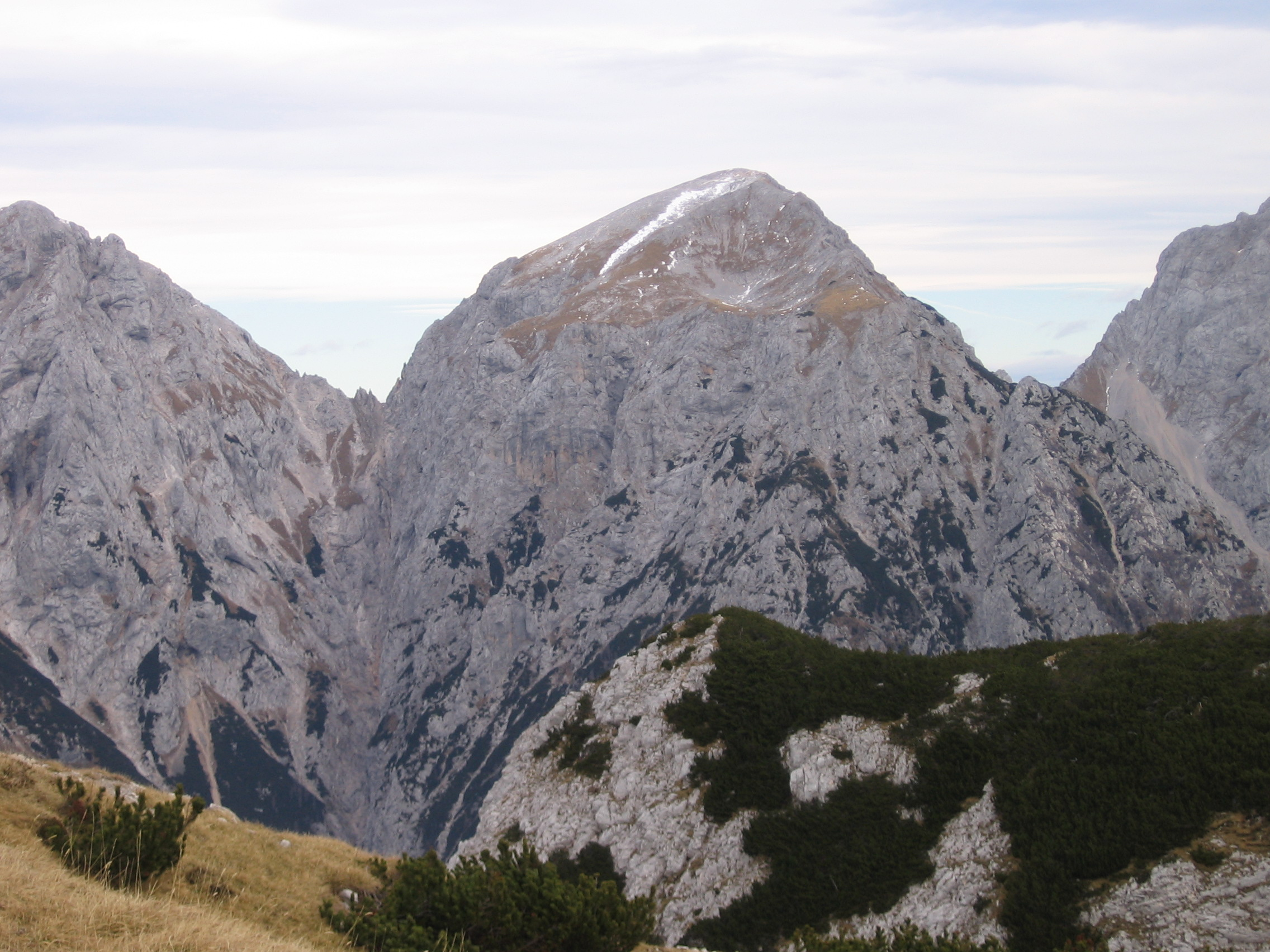
Brana
