= Pristava House =

Slovenian manor house

Coordinates: 46°27′15.38″N 14°5′29.28″E

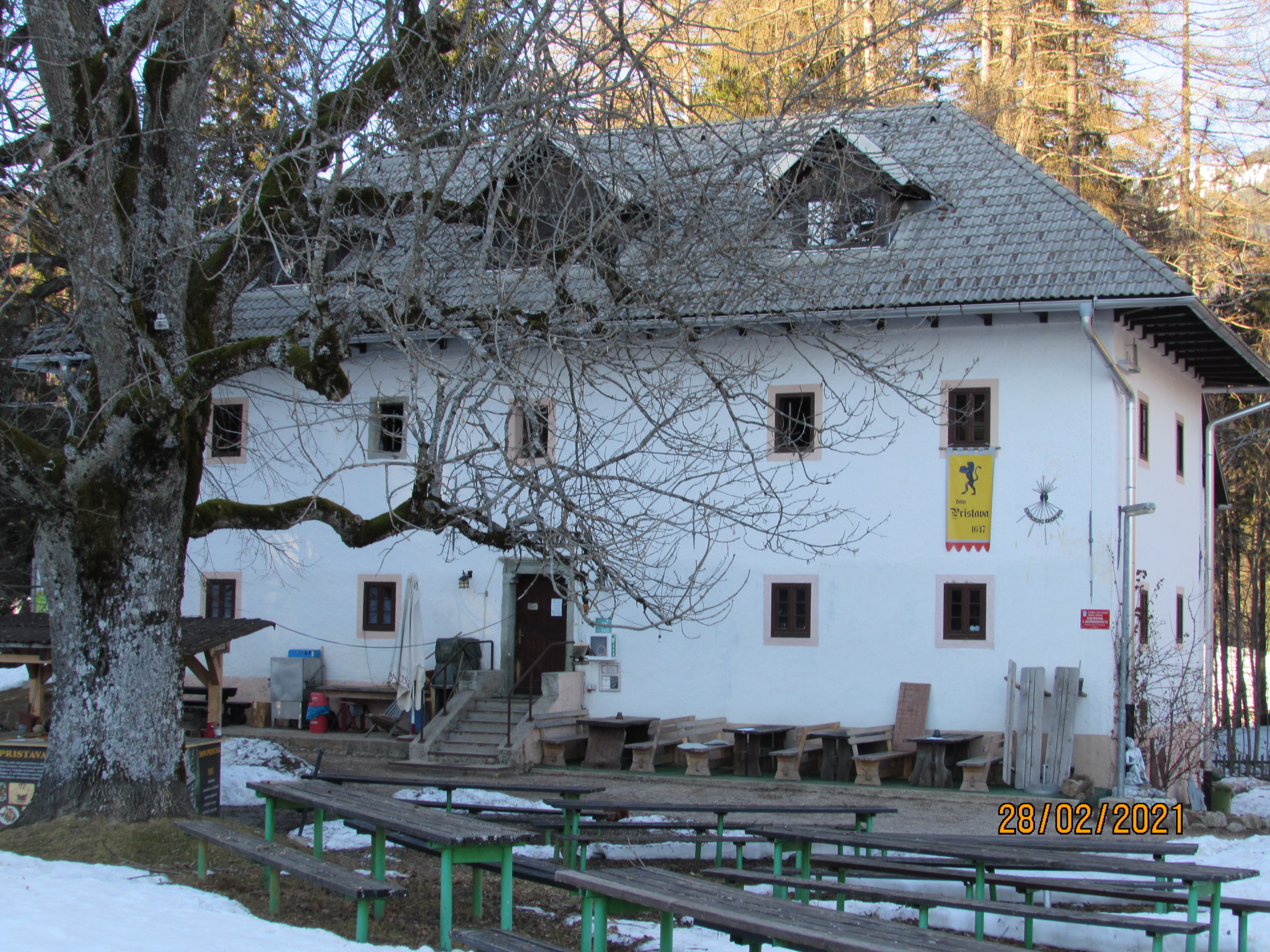
Pristava Manor

The Pristava House (Slovene: Dom Pristava) is a manor house in the Municipality of Jesenice in northern Slovenia. A popular excursion point, it is located above the settlement of Javorniški Rovt in the foothills of the Karawanks Alps, at an elevation of 975 metres (3,199 ft).

The house was built in 1641 or 1647 as a mountain chalet for the local ironworks-owning lower nobility. At the beginning of the 18th century, the building belonged to Karl von Zois, a nobleman and Enlightenment botanist who established the second botanical park in Carniola at the site. The park, which features a variety of local and exotic trees, still exists.

The Pristava House features an inn, a restaurant, and an open-air dance-floor. The surrounding meadows are known for their scenic profusion of wild daffodils in the late springtime. Nearby Javornik Falls, a series of three waterfalls in the upper course of Javornik Creek, is a popular hiking destination. The house is accessible by road from the village of Koroška Bela, or on foot via the Gajšek Trail.
