= Jure Robič =

Slovenian cyclist and soldier

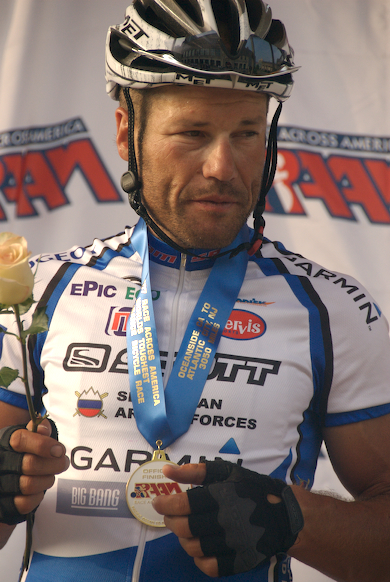
- Robič after winning the 2007 Race Across America

Personal information
- Full name: Jure Robič
- Born: 10 April 1965 Jesenice, Slovenia
- Died: 24 September 2010 (aged 45) Plavški Rovt, Slovenia

Cycling career
- Sport: Cycling
- Discipline: Ultra-endurance cycling

Major wins
- 5 times RAAM winner (2004, 2005, 2007, 2008, 2010); 24h time world record 2 times winner Le Tour Direct/Ultime

Jure Robič (Slovene pronunciation: [ˈjuːˌrɛ ˈrobɪtʃ]; 10 April 1965, Jesenice, Slovenia – 24 September 2010, Plavški Rovt) was a Slovenian cyclist and a soldier in the Slovenian Army. He became prominent for his multiple wins in the men's solo category of Race Across America (RAAM). He died on 24 September 2010 in a head-on collision during training. He was descending on his bike on a narrow mountain forest road in Plavški Rovt near Jesenice in Slovenia and hit an oncoming car.

Robič won the Race Across America (RAAM) 5 times (then a record in the men's solo category): in 2004, 2005, 2007, 2008 and 2010. He was in the second place at the final time station in 2009, but dropped out of the race in protest against what he found to be unfair time penalties awarded against him. For example, he received a time penalty for urinating in a non-designated place on the start day of the race, before the race even started. Robič swore never to enter RAAM again, but changed his mind and came back and won again in 2010.

On 19 September 2004, Robič broke the world 24-hour road record by cycling 834.77 km (518.70 mi) non-stop. In 2005, he won Le Tour Direct, (7d 19h 40m) a 4,023 km (2,500 mi) race on a course derived from classic Tour de France routes. Robič won the DOS-Ras Race Across Slovenia four times, the Tour Direct twice, and the Tortour in 2010.

Robič was renowned for pushing himself to extreme mental breakdown and hallucinations, sleeping less than 90 minutes per day during endurance races. He was laboratory-tested, and his abilities to produce power and to transport oxygen were found matching those of other top ultra-endurance champions worldwide. During the 2004 Race Across America, it was reported that he only slept for a total of eight hours during his eight-day, 2,958.5-mile (4,761.2 km) ride across the United States.

From 1988 to 1994, Robič was a member of the Slovenian National Cycling Team. During that time, he was also a Slovenian national road champion. In his career he won more than 100 races and was on the podium at least 150 times. He was also a winner of Maraton Franja, Juriš na Vršič.

In addition to achievements in races, Robič was the recipient of the Sportsman of the Year awards for special achievements, Slovenian of the year for special achievements, and awards for fair play and tolerance in sport.
