= Potoki, Jesenice =

Potoki
- Location in Slovenia
- Coordinates: 46°25′1″N 14°7′5″E
- Country: Slovenia
- Traditional region: Upper Carniola
- Statistical region: Upper Carniola
- Municipality: Jesenice
- Elevation: 581 m (1,906 ft)

Population (2002)
  - Total: 115

Potoki (pronounced [pɔˈtoːki]) is a settlement in the Municipality of Jesenice in the Upper Carniola region of Slovenia.
