= Prihodi =

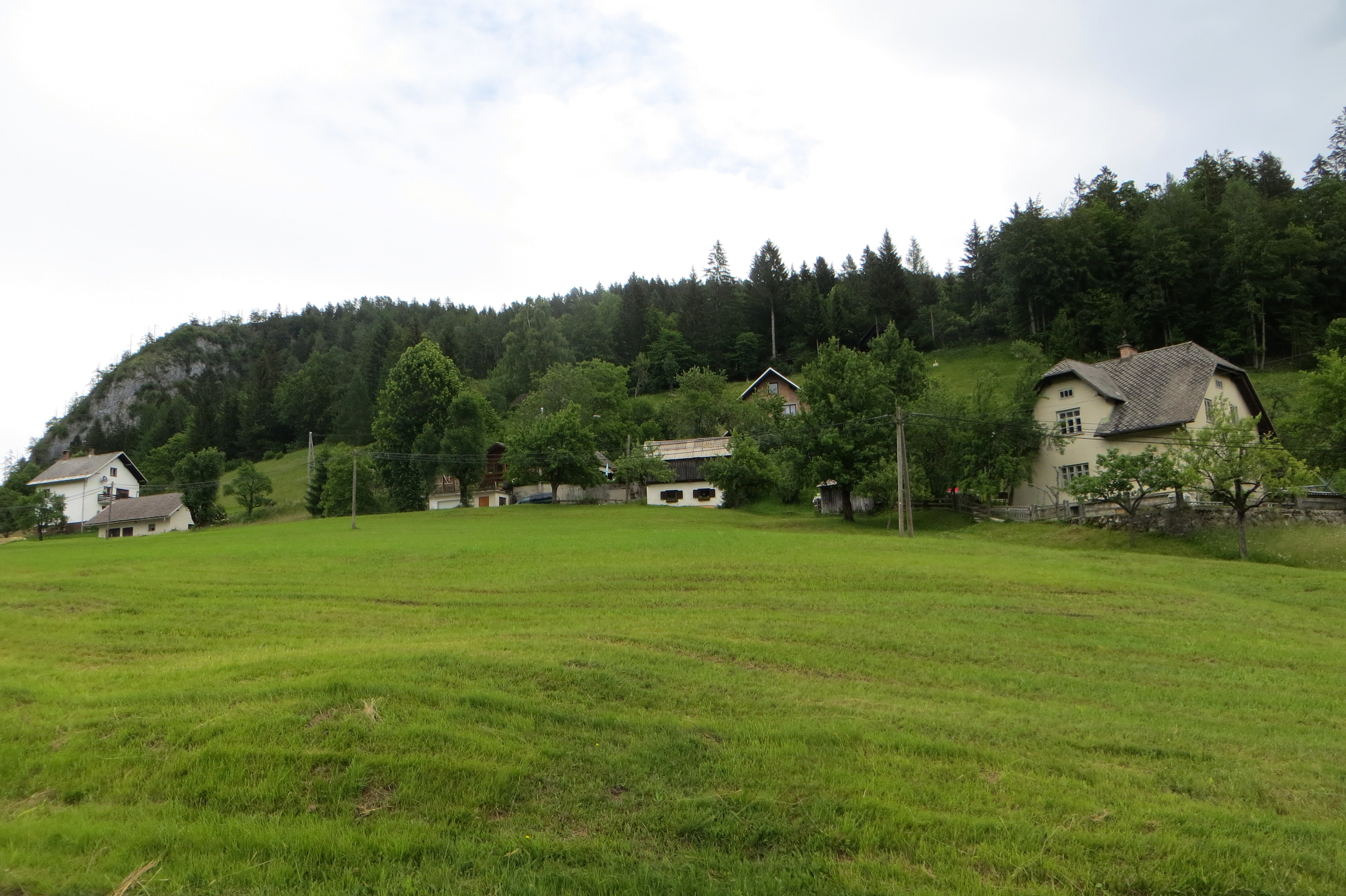

- Location in Slovenia
- Coordinates: 46°27′11″N 14°2′26″E
- Country: Slovenia
- Traditional region: Upper Carniola
- Statistical region: Upper Carniola
- Municipality: Jesenice
- Elevation: 846 m (2,776 ft)

Population (2002)
  - Total: 97

Prihodi (pronounced [pɾiˈxoːdi], in older sources also Perhode) is a settlement in the Municipality of Jesenice in the Upper Carniola region of Slovenia.
