= Lipce, Jesenice =

Lipce
- Location in Slovenia
- Coordinates: 46°25′4″N 14°5′32″E
- Country: Slovenia
- Traditional region: Upper Carniola
- Statistical region: Upper Carniola
- Municipality: Jesenice
- Elevation: 554 m (1,818 ft)

Population (2002)
  - Total: 264

Lipce (pronounced [ˈliːptsɛ]) is a settlement in the Municipality of Jesenice in the Upper Carniola region of Slovenia.

Its name is a contracted plural diminutive of the Slovene word lipa 'linden tree'.
