= Municipality of Jezersko =

Municipality of Slovenia

Municipality of Jezersko Občina Jezersko
- Municipality
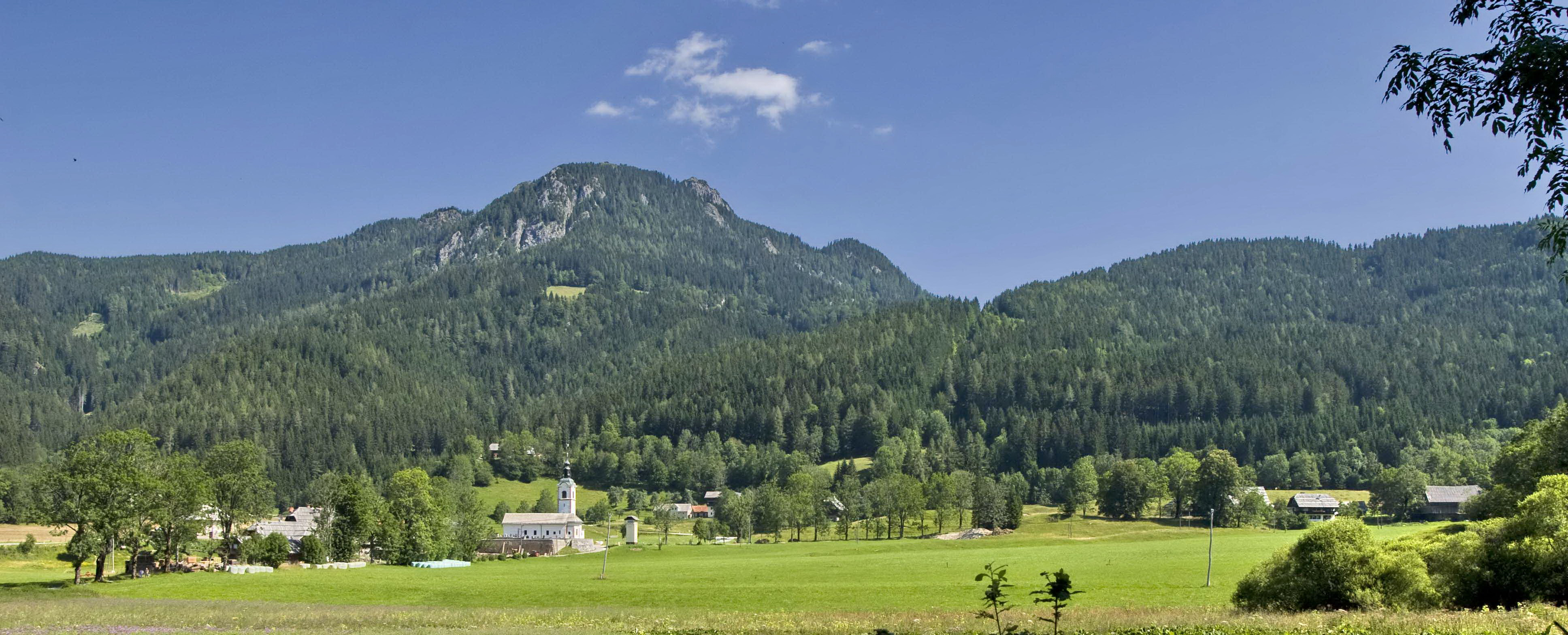

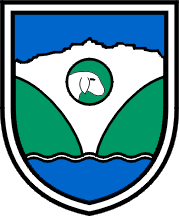
- Coat of arms

- Location of the Municipality of Jezersko in Slovenia
- Coordinates: 46°23′34″N 14°29′51″E
- Country: Slovenia

Government
  - Mayor: Andrej Karničar (Independent)

Area
  - Total: 68.8 km^{2} (26.6 sq mi)

Population (2025)
  - Total: 681
  - Density: 9.90/km^{2} (25.6/sq mi)
- Time zone: UTC+01 (CET)
  - Summer (DST): UTC+02 (CEST)
- Website: www.jezersko.si

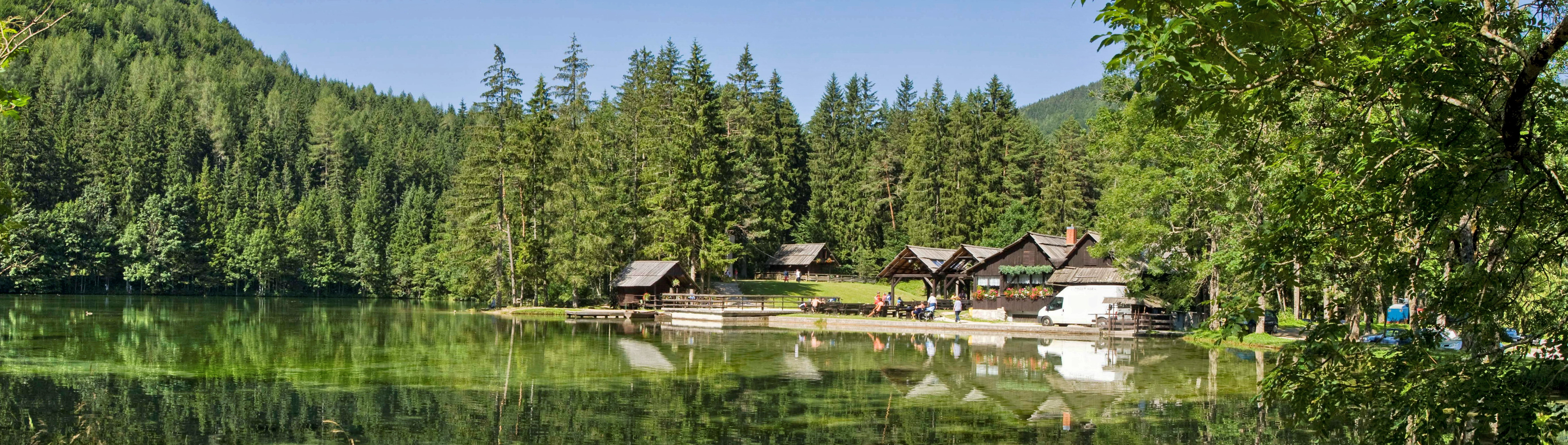
Pasture Lake (Planšarsko jezero), an artificial lake in Jezersko

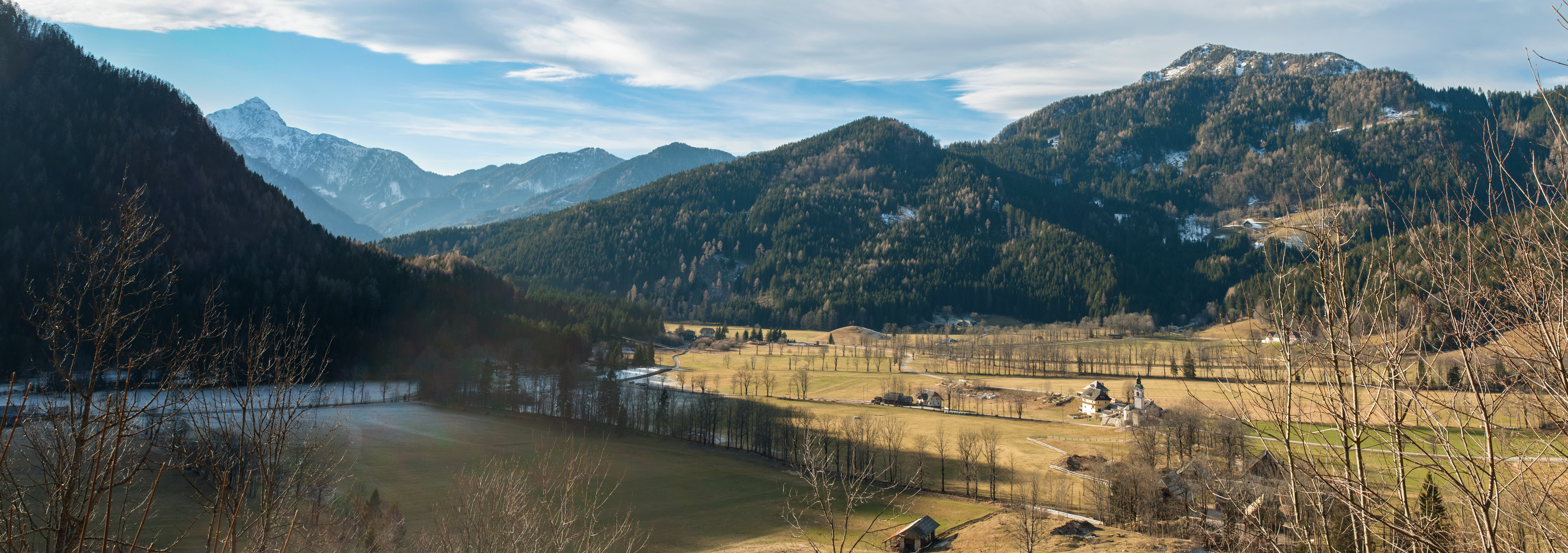
Panoramic view towards Zgornje Jezersko

The Municipality of Jezersko (pronounced [jɛˈzɛːɾskɔ]; Slovene: Občina Jezersko) is a municipality in northern Slovenia. In 1995, Jezersko became part of Preddvor and became an independent municipality in 1998. Originally located in the historic region of Carinthia, it became part of the Upper Carniola Statistical Region in 2005. The seat of the municipality is the town of Zgornje Jezersko.

Jezersko is located in the remote Kokra Valley in the Kamnik–Savinja Alps, south of the Seeberg Saddle mountain pass and the border with the Austrian state of Carinthia. It borders Austria.

== History ==
The name of the area derives from a glacial lake near the settlement of Zgornje Jezersko that started to disappear after an earthquake in 1348. However, it was still described by Johann Weikhard von Valvasor in 1689 as a large lake. It gave the area its German name Seeland (literally "lake land", first recorded as Seelant in 1496), and its Slovene equivalent Jezersko, which came into use at the end of the 19th century. A document from 1391 mentions the church of "St. Oswald by the Lake" (Sv. Ožbolt pri Jezeru).

The remote village was part of the Duchy of Carinthia until 1919, administratively linked to Eisenkappel in the north; however, the residents did not consider themselves "true" Carinthians. It was therefore the only settlement already ceded by the Carinthian Landtag assembly to the newly established State of Slovenes, Croats and Serbs, before it was officially adjudicated together with the Meža Valley and Dravograd to the Kingdom of Serbs, Croats and Slovenes by the 1919 Treaty of Saint-Germain.

== Settlements ==
In addition to the municipal seat of Zgornje Jezersko, the municipality also includes the settlement of Spodnje Jezersko.

== Economy ==
=== Agriculture ===
The main activities that locals engage in are tourism, cattle breeding, and forestry. Cattle breeding is extensive in Jezersko, both by private farms and larger corporations. Jezersko is also the place of the origin of the breed of sheep known as the Jezersko–Solčava sheep. A sheep festival called the Sheep Dance (Ovčji bal) is held annually in mid-August.

=== Tourism ===
Jezersko has a long tourist tradition. There is a 3-star hotel in Jezersko as well as private accommodation in self-catering units at vacation farms. The location of the village offers exceptional views of the surrounding mountains, and it is a starting point for mountain hiking routes to Grintovec, Mount Kočna, and Big Peak (Veliki vrh). The Kranj Lodge at Ledine (Kranjska koča na Ledinah) and the Czech Lodge at Spodnje Ravni (Češka koča na Spodnjih Ravneh) mountain huts are well known to mountain hikers. Lake Planšar (Planšarsko jezero) in Zgornje Jezersko is an artificial lake created after World War II. In winter skiing is also possible.
