= Bašelj =

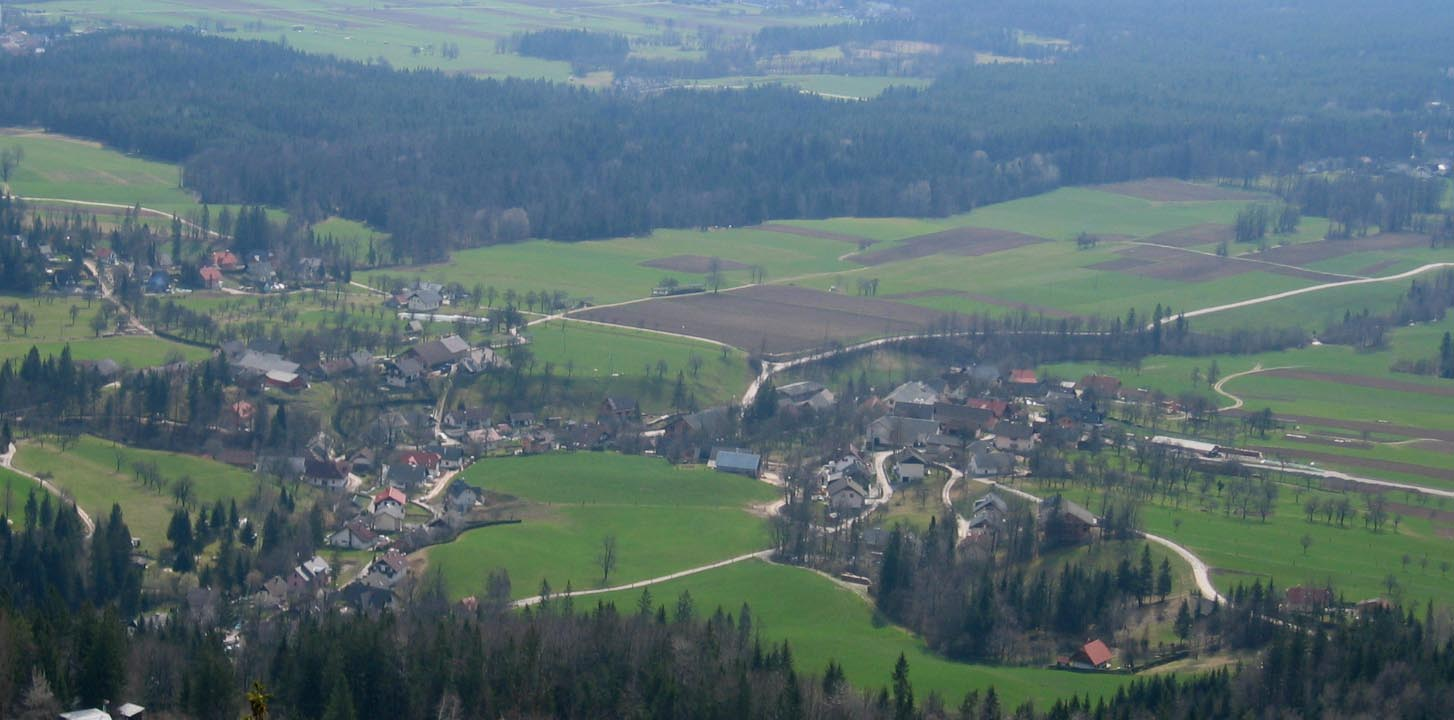

- Location in Slovenia
- Coordinates: 46°18′55.52″N 14°24′5.54″E
- Country: Slovenia
- Traditional region: Upper Carniola
- Statistical region: Upper Carniola
- Municipality: Preddvor

Area
  - Total: 6.43 km^{2} (2.48 sq mi)
- Elevation: 552.9 m (1,814 ft)

Population (2002)
  - Total: 315

Bašelj (pronounced [ˈbaːʃəl]; German: Baschel) is a settlement in the Municipality of Preddvor in the Upper Carniola region of Slovenia.

== Name ==
Bašelj was attested in historical sources as Uasche in 1156, Vaschel in 1395, Baysch in 1484, and Baschel in 1488, among other spellings.

== Church ==
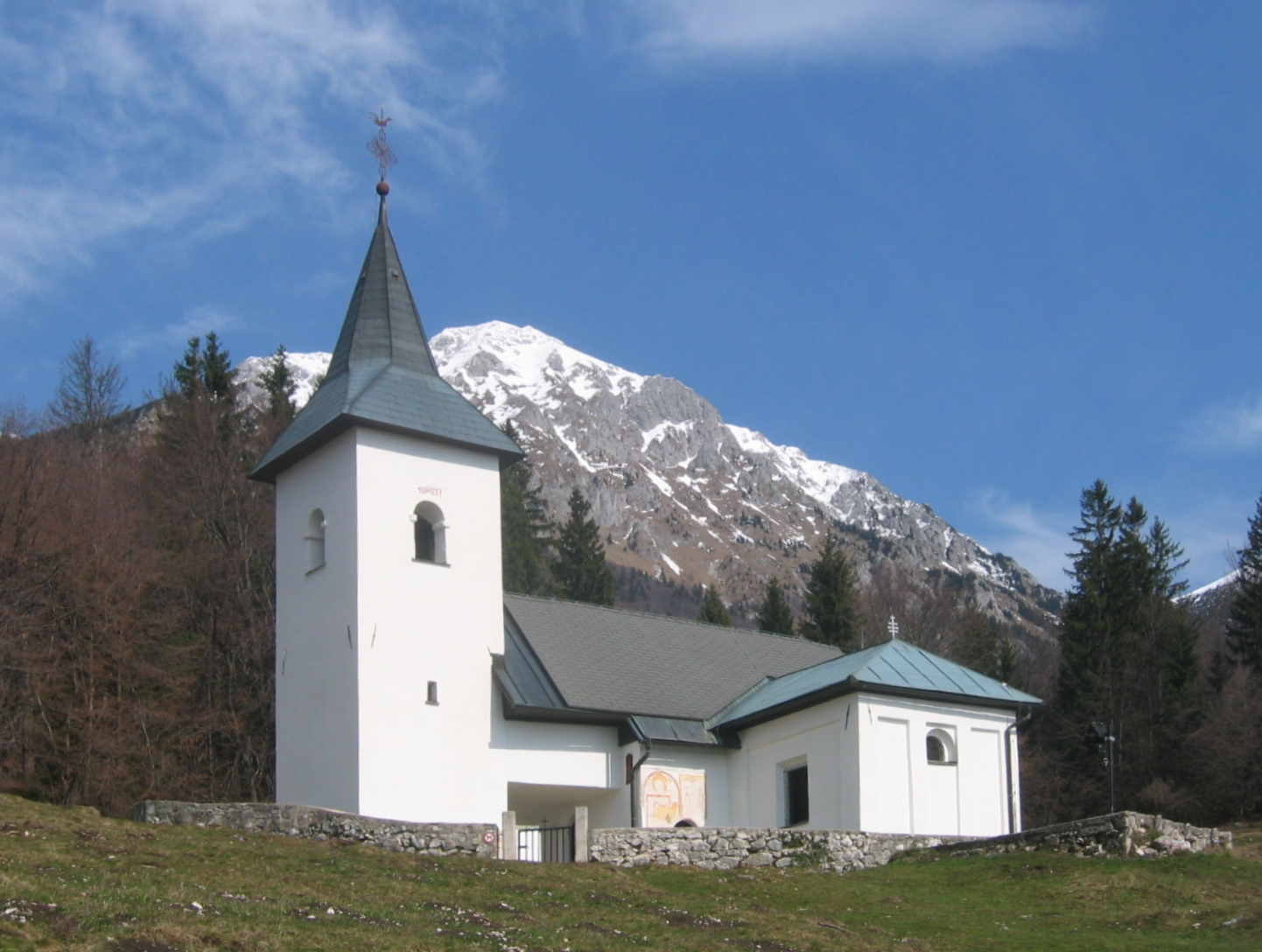
St. Lawrence's Church in Bašelj

The local church, built on a hill above the settlement, is dedicated to Saint Lawrence and contains 15th-century frescos.
