= Podkočna =

- Location in Slovenia
- Coordinates: 46°25′21″N 14°4′58″E
- Country: Slovenia
- Traditional region: Upper Carniola
- Statistical region: Upper Carniola
- Municipality: Jesenice
- Elevation: 532 m (1,745 ft)

Population (2002)
  - Total: 54

Podkočna (pronounced [pɔˈtkoːtʃna]) is a settlement in the Municipality of Jesenice in the Upper Carniola region of Slovenia. A railway halt of the Bohinj Railway, the Kočna Rail Halt (Slovene: Železniško postajališče Kočna), is located in the village.
