= Kočna =

Mountain in Slovenia

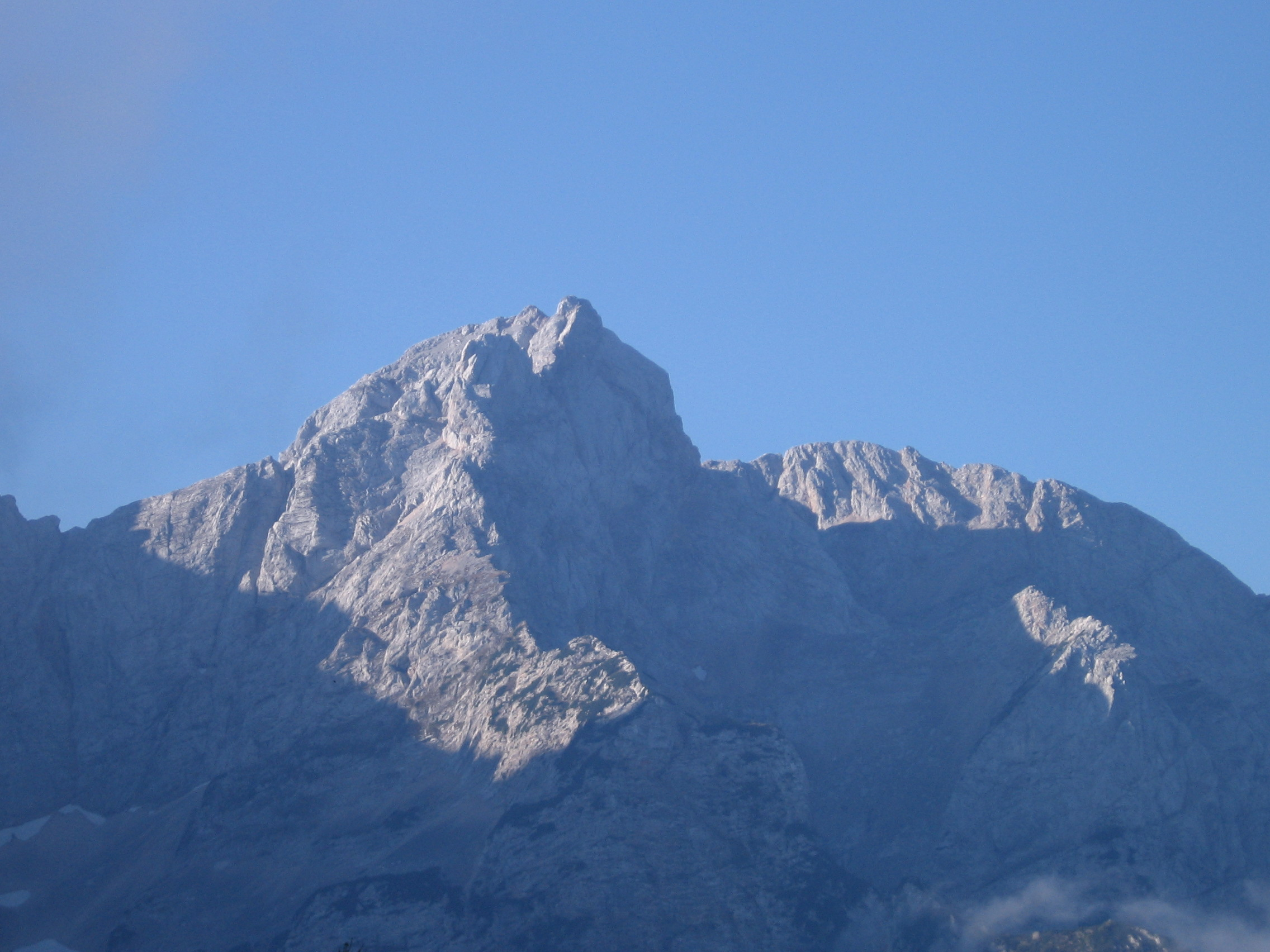

Highest point
- Elevation: 2,540 m (8,330 ft)
- Coordinates: 46°21′31.320″N 14°31′19.416″E

Geography
- Location within Slovenia
- Location: Slovenia
- Parent range: Kamnik–Savinja Alps

Climbing
- First ascent: 1840 Jernik & Suhadolnik

Kočna at 2,540 metres (8,330 ft) high, is the second-highest mountain in the Kamnik–Savinja Alps and the westernmost peak of the Grintovec Range (Slovene: Grintovci). Its prominent and easily recognized peak is visible from far around. The mountain has two peaks: the higher Jezersko Kočna (Jezerska Kočna, 2,540 metres or 8,330 feet) and the nearby lower Kokra Kočna (Slovene: Kokrska Kočna, 2,520 metres or 8,270 feet).

== Name ==
The oronym Kočna is derived from the Slovenian common noun kočna 'cirque', referring to a valley with an amphitheater-like head and also to the valley head itself with pastures and forests below the wall of a mountain, and was applied to the mountain via metonymy. The common noun kočna itself is derived from the Slavic root *kǫtъ 'corner'. The name Kočna is also found as a settlement name for the nearby village of Kočna and in the derived name Podkočna.

== Starting points ==
- Zgornje Jezersko (889 m)
- Kamnik, Kamnik Bistrica (601 m)
- Kokra, Preddvor

== Routes ==
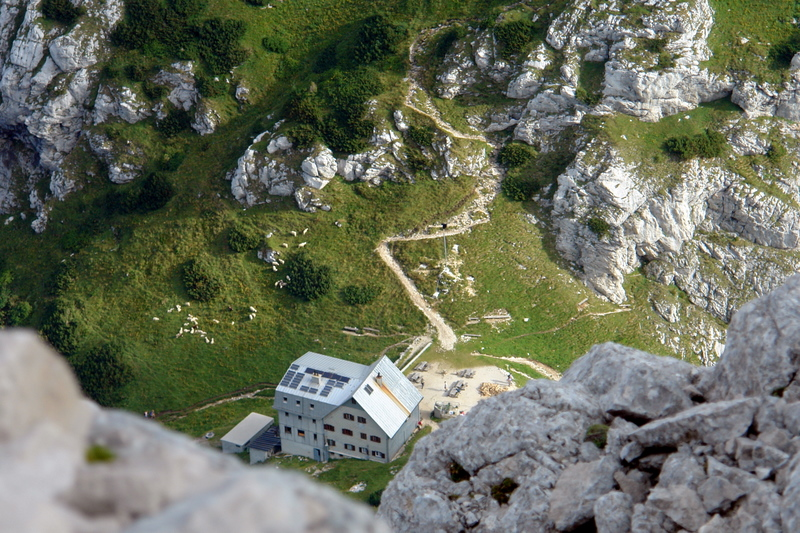
The Zois Lodge

- 4½-5h: from Kokra: the Suhadolnik Route
- 3¼h: from the Czech Lodge at Spodnje Ravni (Slovene: Češka koča na Spodnjih Ravneh; 1542 m): the Kremžar Route
- 3½h: from the Zois Lodge at Kokra Saddle (Slovene: Cojzova koča na Kokrskem sedlu; 1793 m)
- 1¾h: from the top of Mount Grintovec: the Šprem Route
