= Javorniški Rovt =

- Location in Slovenia
- Coordinates: 46°27′12″N 14°5′31″E
- Country: Slovenia
- Traditional region: Upper Carniola
- Statistical region: Upper Carniola
- Municipality: Jesenice
- Elevation: 962 m (3,156 ft)

Population (2002)
  - Total: 189

Javorniški Rovt (pronounced [ˈjaːʋɔɾniʃki ˈɾoːu̯t]) is a settlement in the Municipality of Jesenice in the Upper Carniola region of Slovenia. It is located in the foothills of the Karawanks, above its namesake settlement of Slovenski Javornik (which occupies the floor of the Sava Valley.)

== Name ==
The name Javorniški Rovt literally means 'Javornik meadow', referring to the geographical location of the settlement. The common noun rovt 'glade, clearing', refers to a meadow on cleared land in a hilly area and is derived from Old High German rût 'clearing'. The noun occurs in various other settlement names in Slovenia (e.g., Rovt, Rovte, Rut).

== Mass grave ==
Javorniški Rovt is the site of a mass grave from the period immediately after the Second World War. The Jezerce Mass Grave (Slovene: Grobišče Jezerce) lies northeast of the settlement in an area that was part of a test excavation for dredging and damming Javornik Creek to create a reservoir for a hydroelectric plant. It contains the remains of nine Home Guard soldiers from the Selca or Poljane valley that were murdered in early May 1945.

== Pristava Lodge ==
Its best-known landmark is Pristava, a popular excursion point centered on the Pristava House, built in 1647 and recently renovated. The building belonged to the nobleman and Enlightenment figure Sigmund Zois, who established a botanical park featuring interesting local and imported trees that is now named after him.
