= Plavški Rovt =

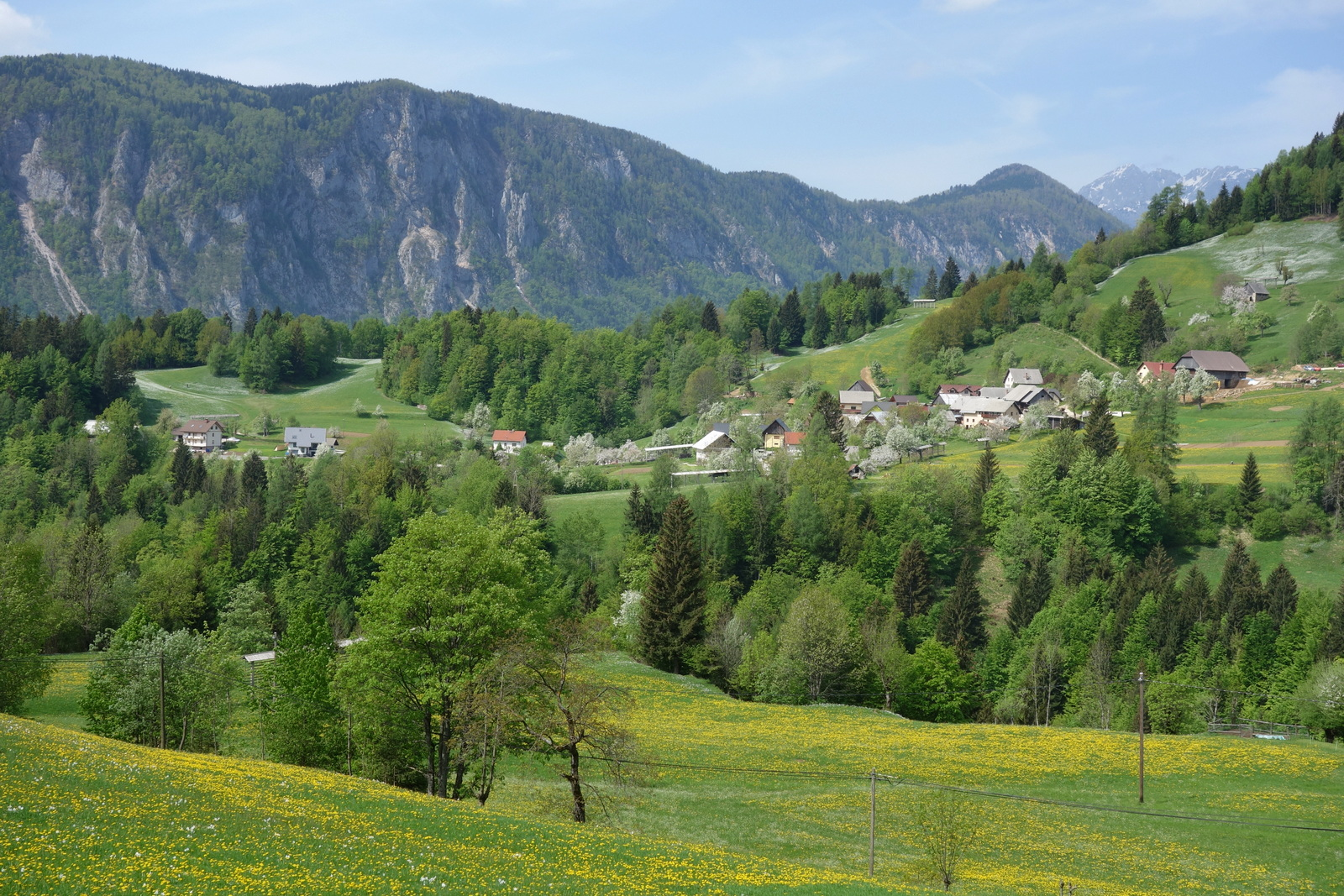

- Location in Slovenia
- Coordinates: 46°27′11″N 14°2′4″E
- Country: Slovenia
- Traditional region: Upper Carniola
- Statistical region: Upper Carniola
- Municipality: Jesenice
- Elevation: 860 m (2,820 ft)

Population (2002)
  - Total: 86

Plavški Rovt (pronounced [ˈplaːu̯ʃki ˈɾoːu̯t]) is a settlement in the Municipality of Jesenice in the Upper Carniola region of Slovenia.
