= Lom pod Storžičem =

- Location in Slovenia
- Coordinates: 46°22′0.44″N 14°20′5.84″E
- Country: Slovenia
- Traditional region: Upper Carniola
- Statistical region: Upper Carniola
- Municipality: Tržič
- Elevation: 699.4 m (2,295 ft)

Population (2002)
  - Total: 339

Lom (pronounced [ˈlɔm pɔt ˈstɔːɾʒitʃɛm]) is a village in the Municipality of Tržič in the Upper Carniola region of Slovenia. The local church in this village is dedicated to Saint Catherine.

== Name ==
The name of the settlement was changed from Lom to Lom pod Storžičem in 1953.
