= Municipality of Jesenice =

Municipality of Slovenia

Municipality of Jesenice Občina Jesenice
- Municipality
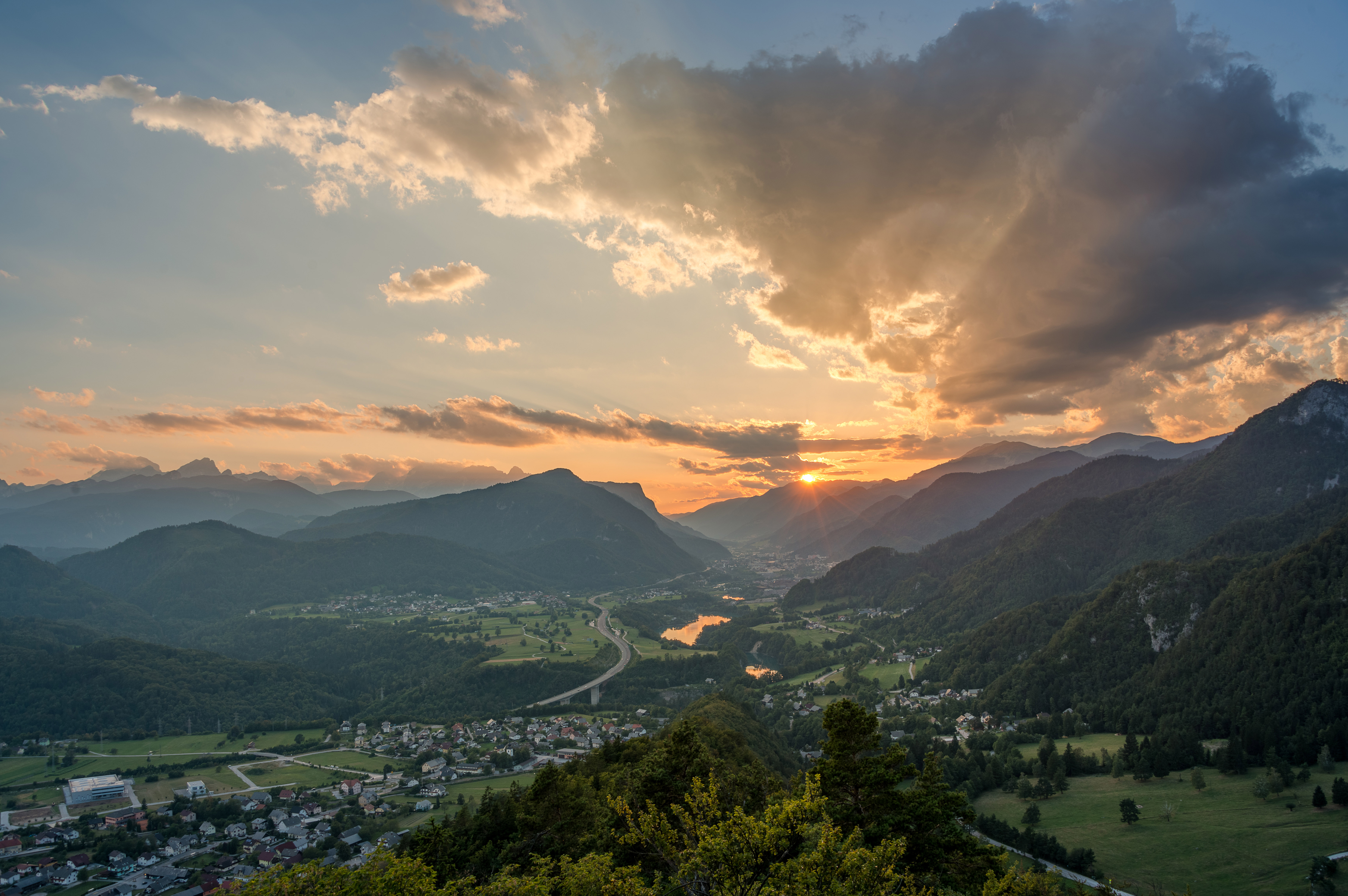

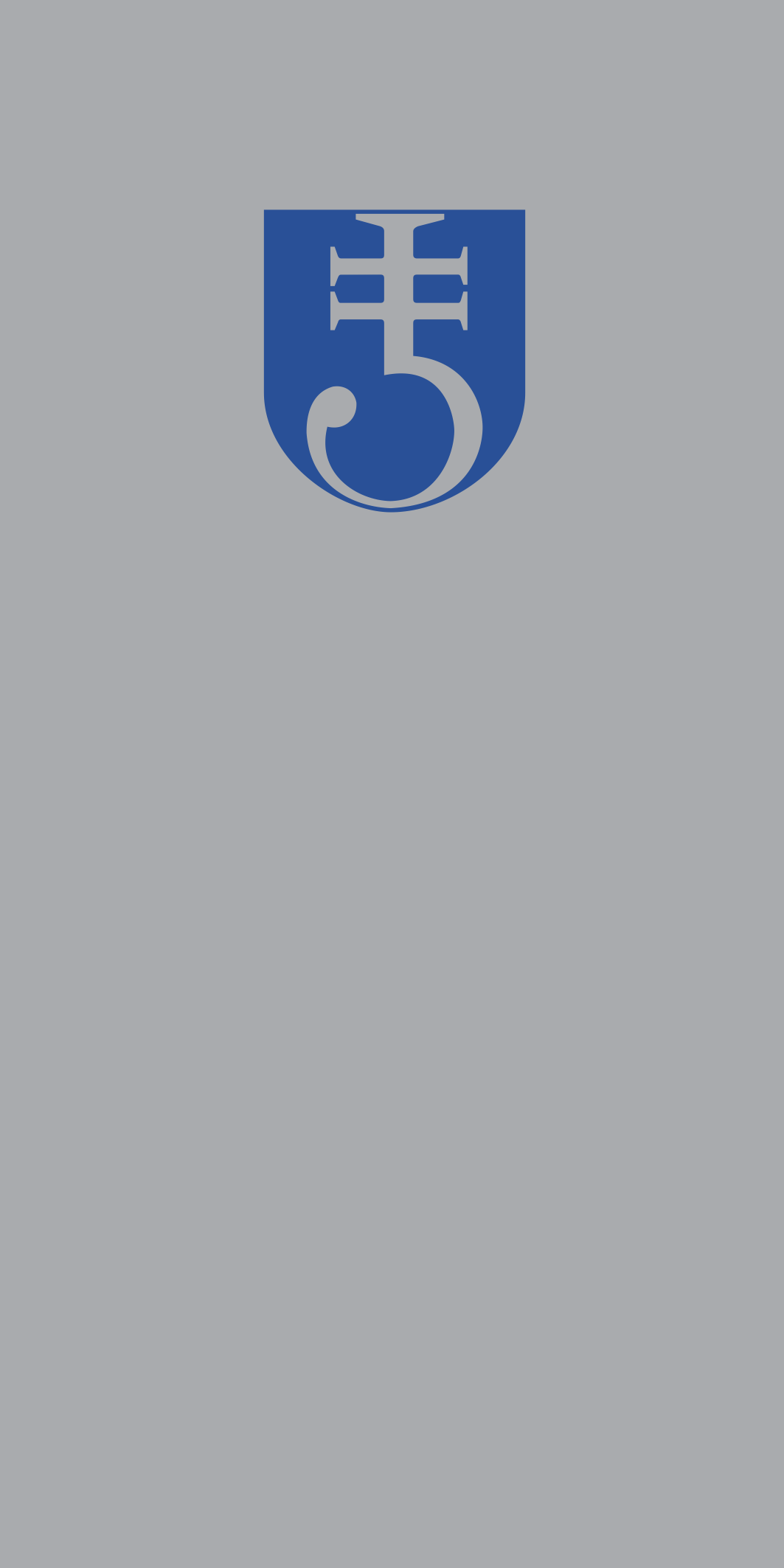
- Flag Coat of arms

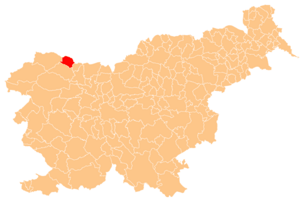
- Location of the Municipality of Jesenice in Slovenia
- Coordinates: 46°26′N 14°03′E
- Country: Slovenia

Government
  - Mayor: Peter Bohinec (Independent)

Area
  - Total: 75.8 km^{2} (29.3 sq mi)
- Elevation: 576.3 m (1,891 ft)

Population (2025)
  - Total: 21,895
  - Density: 289/km^{2} (748/sq mi)
- Time zone: UTC+01 (CET)
  - Summer (DST): UTC+02 (CEST)
- Website: www.jesenice.si

The Municipality of Jesenice (pronounced [jɛsɛˈniːtsɛ]; Slovene: Občina Jesenice) is a municipality in northwest Slovenia. The seat of the municipality is the town of Jesenice. It has 21,895 inhabitants.

Historical population
Year	Pop.	±%
1948	13,761	—
1953	15,981	+16.1%
1961	18,536	+16.0%
1971	20,062	+8.2%
1981	22,706	+13.2%
1991	22,548	−0.7%
2002	21,620	−4.1%
2011	21,645	+0.1%
2021	21,679	+0.2%
Source: SURS

== Geography ==
The municipality lies in the Upper Carniola region, in the Upper Sava Valley. It is bordered by the Karawanks and Austria (Carinthia) to the north, and by Mount Mežakla to the south.

=== Settlements ===
In addition to the municipal seat of Jesenice, the municipality also includes the following settlements:

- Blejska Dobrava
- Hrušica
- Javorniški Rovt
- Kočna
- Koroška Bela
- Lipce
- Planina pod Golico
- Plavški Rovt
- Podkočna
- Potoki
- Prihodi
- Slovenski Javornik
