= Spodnje Jezersko =

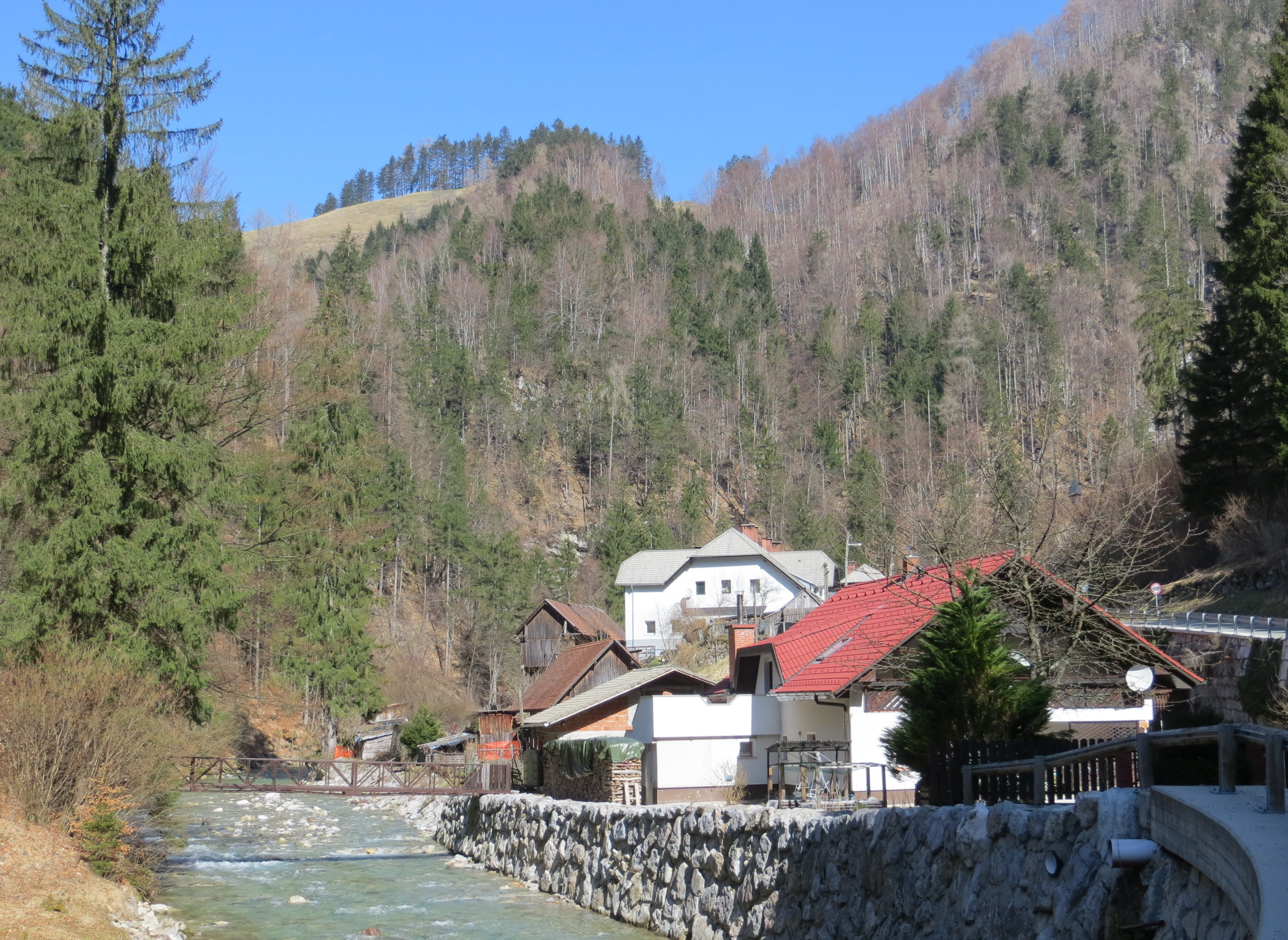

- Location in Slovenia
- Coordinates: 46°22′54.81″N 14°28′7.28″E
- Country: Slovenia
- Traditional region: Carinthia
- Statistical region: Upper Carniola
- Municipality: Jezersko

Area
  - Total: 27.84 km^{2} (10.75 sq mi)
- Elevation: 715.2 m (2,346 ft)

Population (2002)
  - Total: 80

Spodnje Jezersko (pronounced [ˈspoːdnjɛ jɛˈzɛːɾskɔ]; literally, 'Lower Jezersko') is a settlement in the Municipality of Jezersko in Slovenia. It is part of the traditional region of Carinthia and the Upper Carniola Statistical Region.

== Geology ==
On the left bank of the Kokra River, about 2 km south of the settlement, thick layers of travertine are occasionally still mined, particularly for restoration of listed buildings in Upper Carniola, where it was traditionally used as a building material.

== Chapel ==
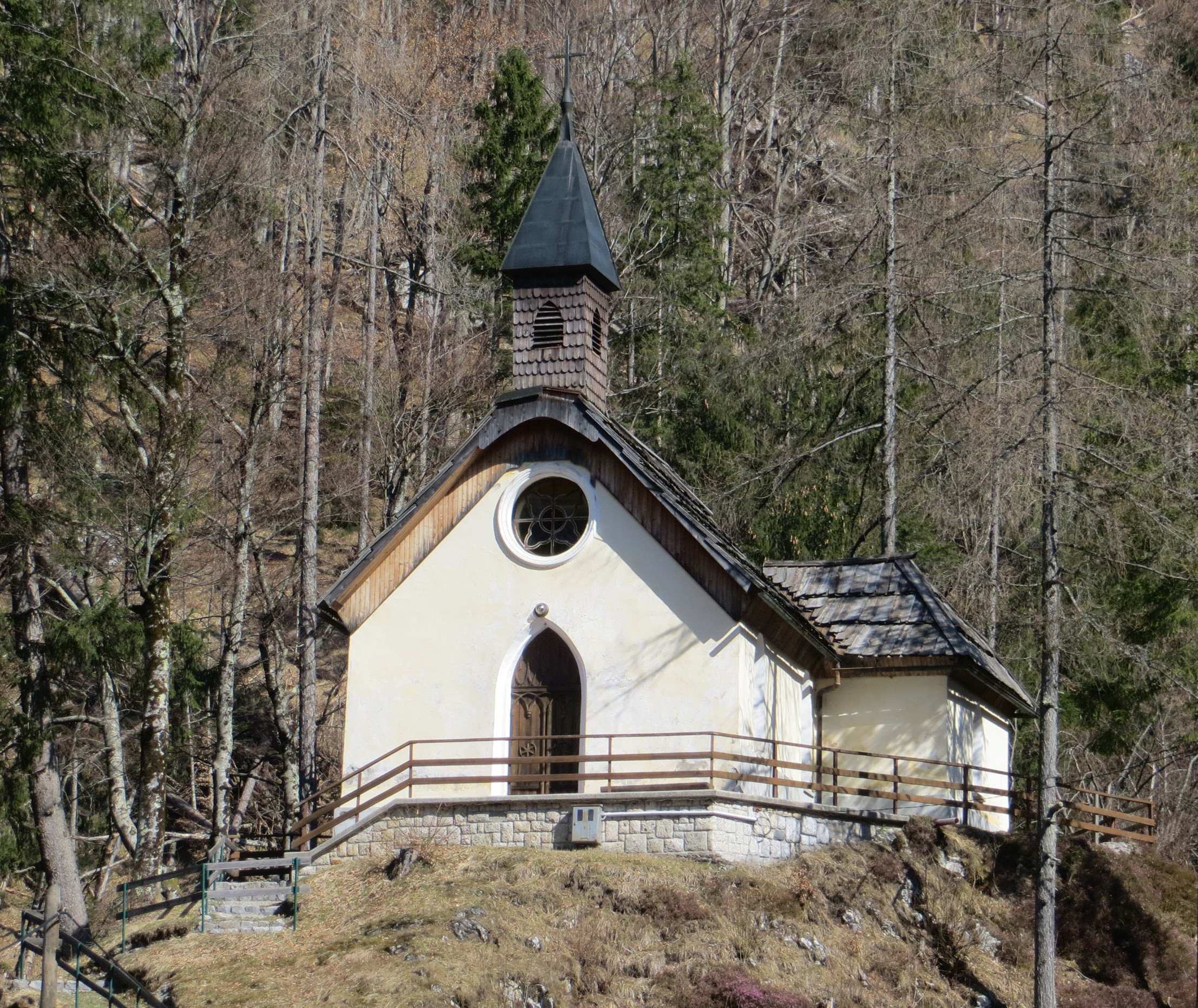
Saint Hubertus's Chapel

A masonry chapel dedicated to Saint Hubertus stands on a hill in the southern part of the settlement, in the hamlet of Zgornje Fužine. It is a single-nave structure with a belfry that was built in the Gothic Revival style in 1853. The chapel contains wooden furnishings and an oil painting of Saint Hubertus.
