= Grintovec =

Mountain in Slovenia

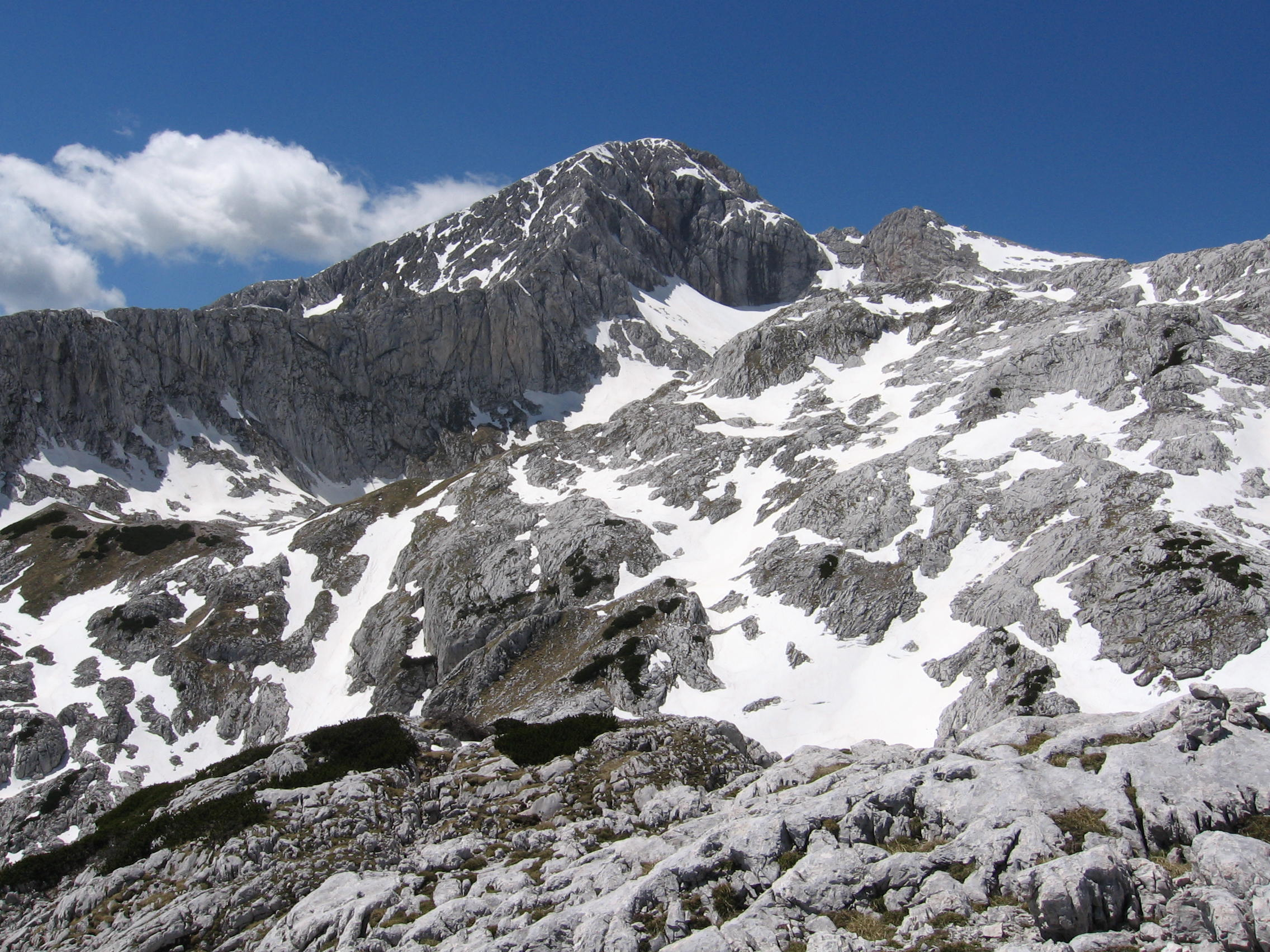

Highest point
- Elevation: 2,558 m (8,392 ft)
- Prominence: 1,706 m (5,597 ft)
- Listing: Ultra
- Coordinates: 46°21′25″N 14°32′10″E

Geography
- Location within Slovenia
- Location: Slovenia
- Parent range: Kamnik–Savinja Alps

Climbing
- First ascent: 1759 by Giovanni Antonio Scopoli
- Easiest route: Hike

Grintovec is the highest mountain of the Kamnik–Savinja Alps, with an elevation of 2,558 metres (8,392 ft). It is a popular location for hiking, climbing and skiing. The first recorded ascent was in 1759 by the botanist Giovanni Antonio Scopoli.

Grintovec has a prominence of 1,706 metres (5,597 ft) and is therefore an ultra. It is the second most prominent peak in Slovenia after Triglav.

It is relatively easy to climb if you start from the lodge in the Kamnik Bistrica Valley, via the Zois Lodge at Kokra Saddle.

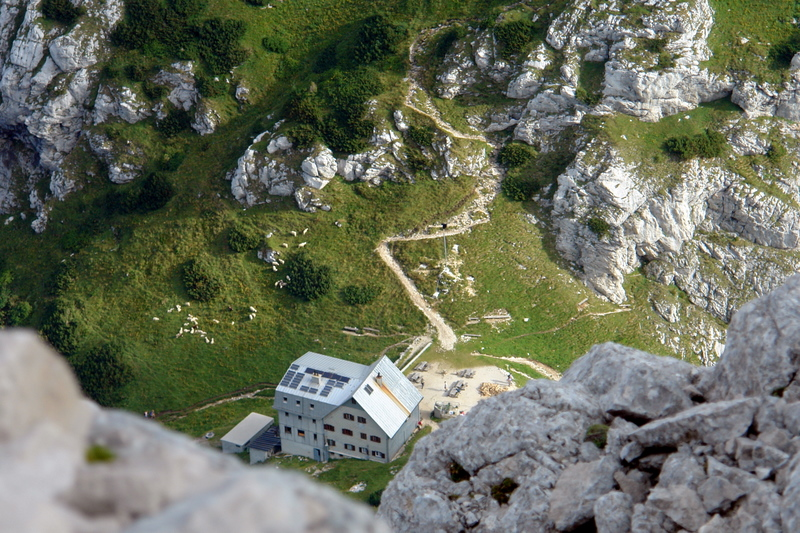
Zois Lodge at Kokra Saddle

== Routes ==
- 2h: From the Zois Lodge at Kokra Saddle (Slovene: Cojzova koča na Kokrskem sedlu) via the Roof Slope (Streha), the southern top slope of Mount Grintovec.
- 3h: From the Czech Lodge at Spodnje Ravni (Slovene: Češka koča na Spodnjih Ravneh) via Little Door Pass (Mala vratca), then on the southeastern ridge Long Wall (Dolga stena)
- 3½h: From the Czech Lodge at Spodnje Ravni via Mlinar Saddle (Mlinarsko sedlo) on eastern ridge
- 3½-4 h: From the Czech Lodge at Spodnje Ravni on the Dolci Notch Pass (Dolška škrbina), then on the Šprem Route
