= Fužine =

Fužine may refer to:

- Fusine in Valromana, a frazione of Tarvisio, Italy, known as Fužine in Slovene
- Fužine Castle, a castle in Ljubljana, Slovenia
- Fužine, Croatia, a village and municipality in Primorje–Gorski Kotar County, Croatia
- Fužine, Gorenja Vas–Poljane, a settlement in the Municipality of Gorenja Vas–Poljane, Slovenia
- Fužine, Kamnik, a former settlement in central Slovenia, now part of the town of Kamnik
- Fužine (Ljubljana), a former settlement in central Slovenia, now part of the city of Ljubljana
- Nove Fužine, a neighborhood of Ljubljana, Slovenia
