= Zakal =

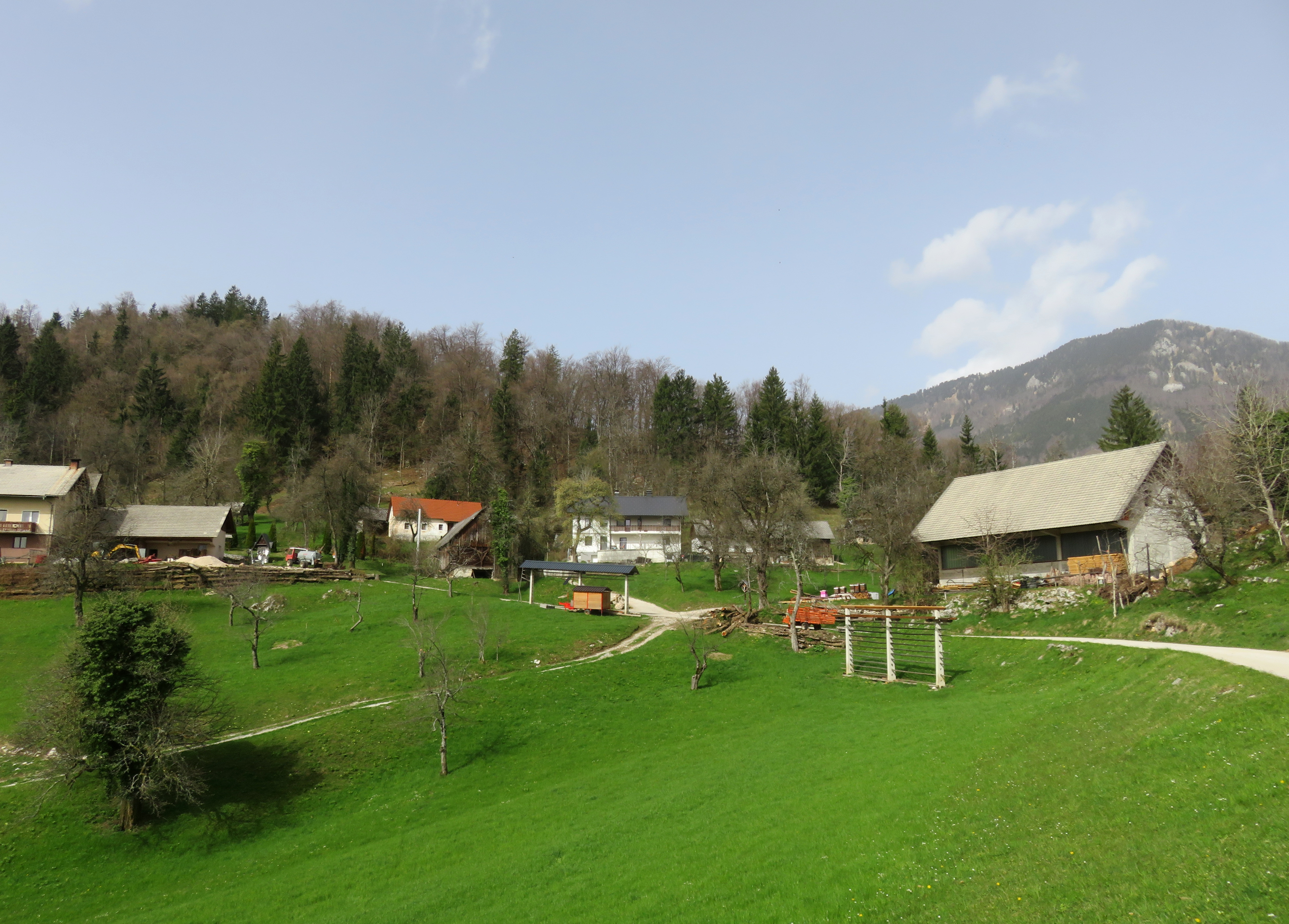

- Location in Slovenia
- Coordinates: 46°15′49.82″N 14°34′37.55″E
- Country: Slovenia
- Traditional region: Upper Carniola
- Statistical region: Central Slovenia
- Municipality: Kamnik

Area
  - Total: 1.97 km^{2} (0.76 sq mi)
- Elevation: 528.6 m (1,734 ft)

Population (2002)
  - Total: 63

Zakal (pronounced [zaˈkaːu̯]) is a dispersed settlement in the hills northwest of Kamnik in the Upper Carniola region of Slovenia.

== Name ==
Zalak was attested in written records as Zachalom in 1457.

== Church ==
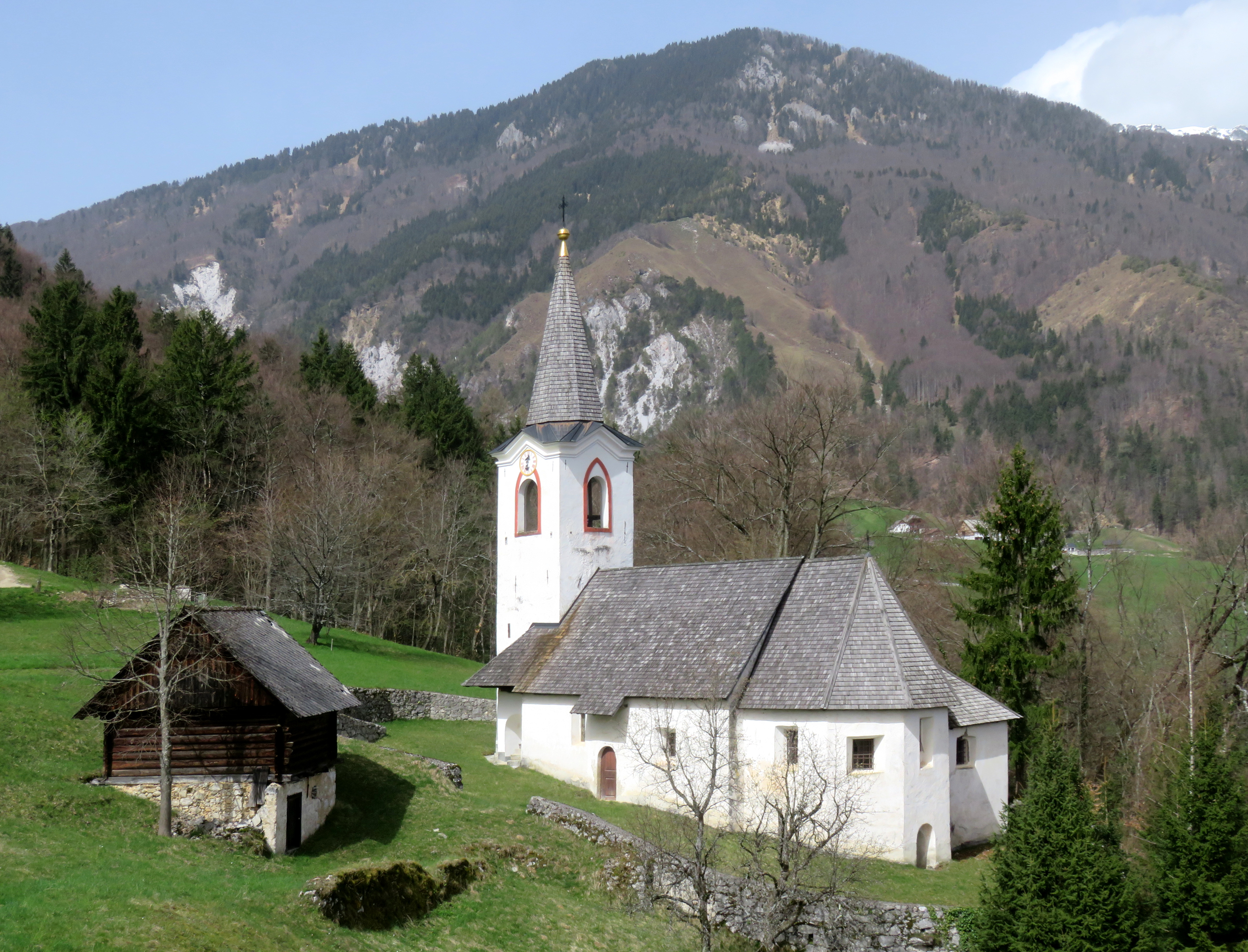
Saint Leonard's Church

The local church, dedicated to Saint Leonard, is an example of a medieval church with a flat ceiling and two gilded altars.
