= Elizabeth Selden =

Elizabeth Selden may refer to:

- Elizabeth Selden Rogers (1868–1950), American civic reformer
- Elizabeth S. Selden (1887–1970), American dancer
