= Novi Trg =

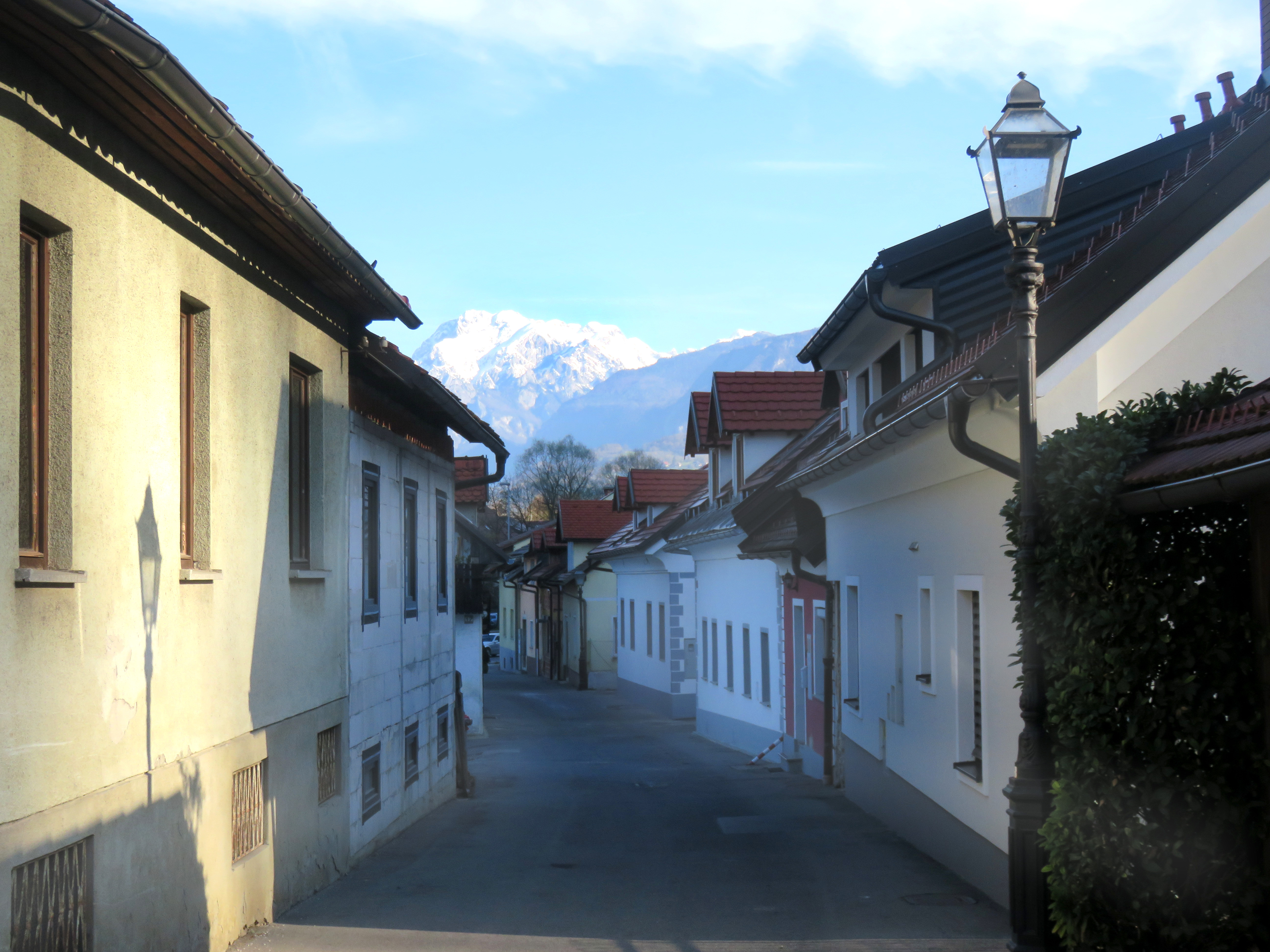

- Location in Slovenia
- Coordinates: 46°13′20″N 14°36′47″E
- Country: Slovenia
- Traditional region: Upper Carniola
- Statistical region: Central Slovenia
- Municipality: Kamnik
- Elevation: 376 m (1,234 ft)

Novi Trg (pronounced [ˈnɔːʋi ˈtəɾk], Slovene: Novi trg, German: Neumarktl or Neumarkt) is a former settlement in the Municipality of Kamnik in central Slovenia. It is now part of the town of Kamnik. The area is part of the traditional region of Upper Carniola. The municipality is now included in the Central Slovenia Statistical Region.

== Geography ==
Novi Trg stands on the left bank of the Kamnik Bistrica River. Kamnik's old castle rises above it to the northeast.

== Name ==
Novi Trg was attested in historical sources as Newnmarcht in 1402, and Newnmarkt in 1428, and Newenmarkt in 1465. The name Novi trg means 'new market town', indicating its later founding than neighboring Kamnik.

== History ==
Novi Trg has long had the character of a suburb of the town of Kamnik; it stood outside the city walls in the past, at the transition into the rural surroundings. Novi Trg was officially annexed by Kamnik in 1952, ending any existence it had as an independent settlement.

== Notable people ==
Notable people that were born or lived in Novi Trg include:

- France Balantič (1921–1943), poet
