= Zaprice Castle =

Coordinates: 46°13′22.99″N 14°36′20.85″E

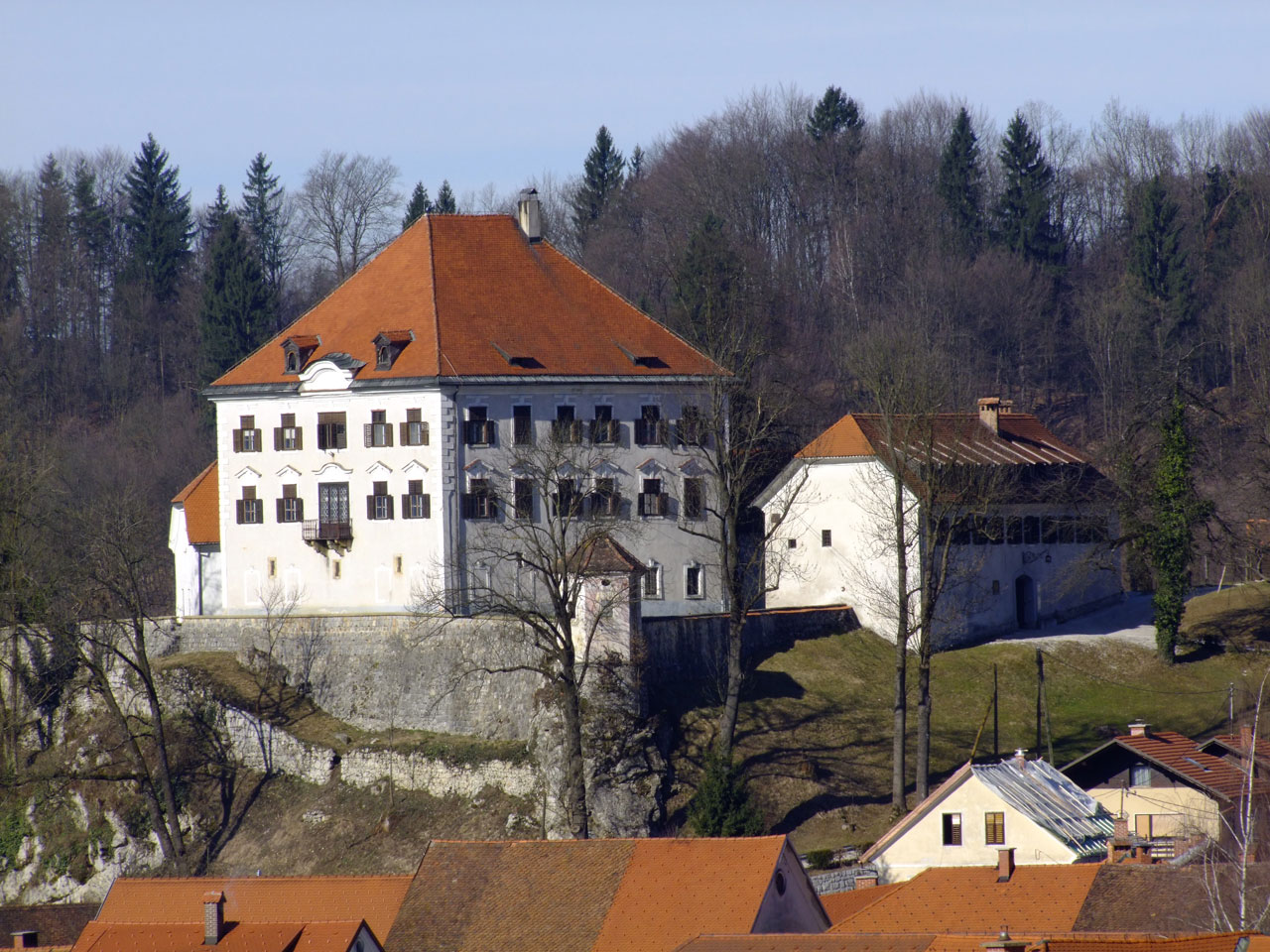
Zaprice Castle from the east

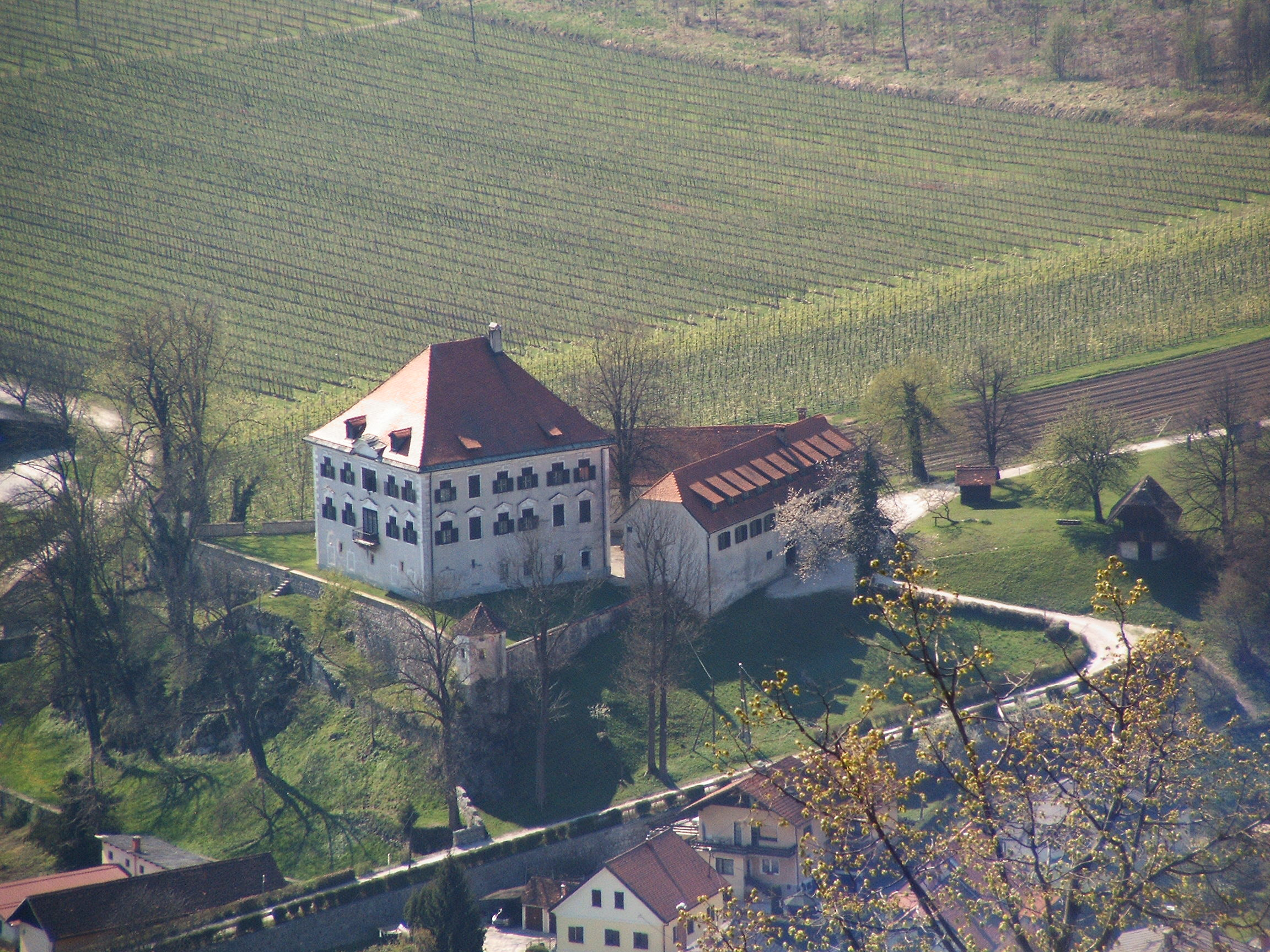
Zaprice Castle from the northeast

Zaprice Castle (Slovene: grad Zaprice, German: Schloss Steinbüchel) is a castle in Zaprice, now part of the town of Kamnik, Slovenia.

The castle was first indirectly mentioned in 1306 and was originally built in the 14th century by the Dienger von Apecz family. It was rebuilt in the early 16th century by Jurij Lamberg, who gave it corner oriel windows and surrounded it with a wall with two towers, and gave it a German name: Steinbüchel. The castle is subsequently remembered as a meeting place for Kamnik's Lutherans. During the 17th and 18th century the castle was rebuilt in the Baroque style and enlarged into a more comfortable residential building. Today, the castle serves as a museum and a venue for cultural and educational events.

== Background ==
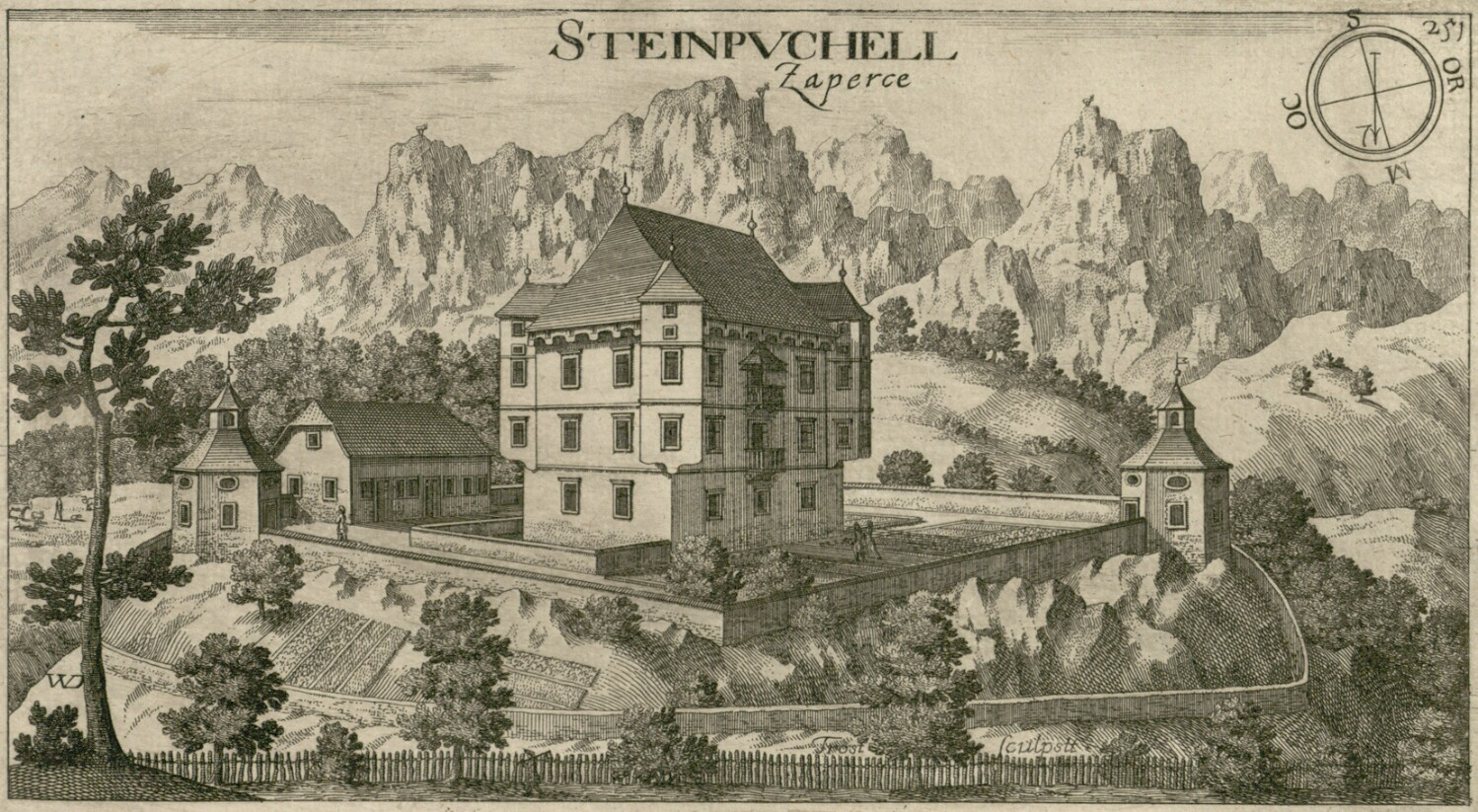
Zaprice Castle in 1689 from the south

The castle has repeatedly changed owners; the last private proprietors were the Rechbachs until 1945, when it was nationalised and transformed into multi-residential building. Soon after, the castle became the museum's headquarters and it was renovated in the following years.

The castle is surrounded by a terraced park and a wall, a dairy farm at the entrance of the complex, two pavilions, a late Gothic sign, and an open-air museum of granaries from the Tuhinj Valley. There is also an archaeological site on the east side of the castle, where the foundation of an apsidal wall, a bronze fibula, and a few fragments of an ancient glass were found.

== Museum collections ==
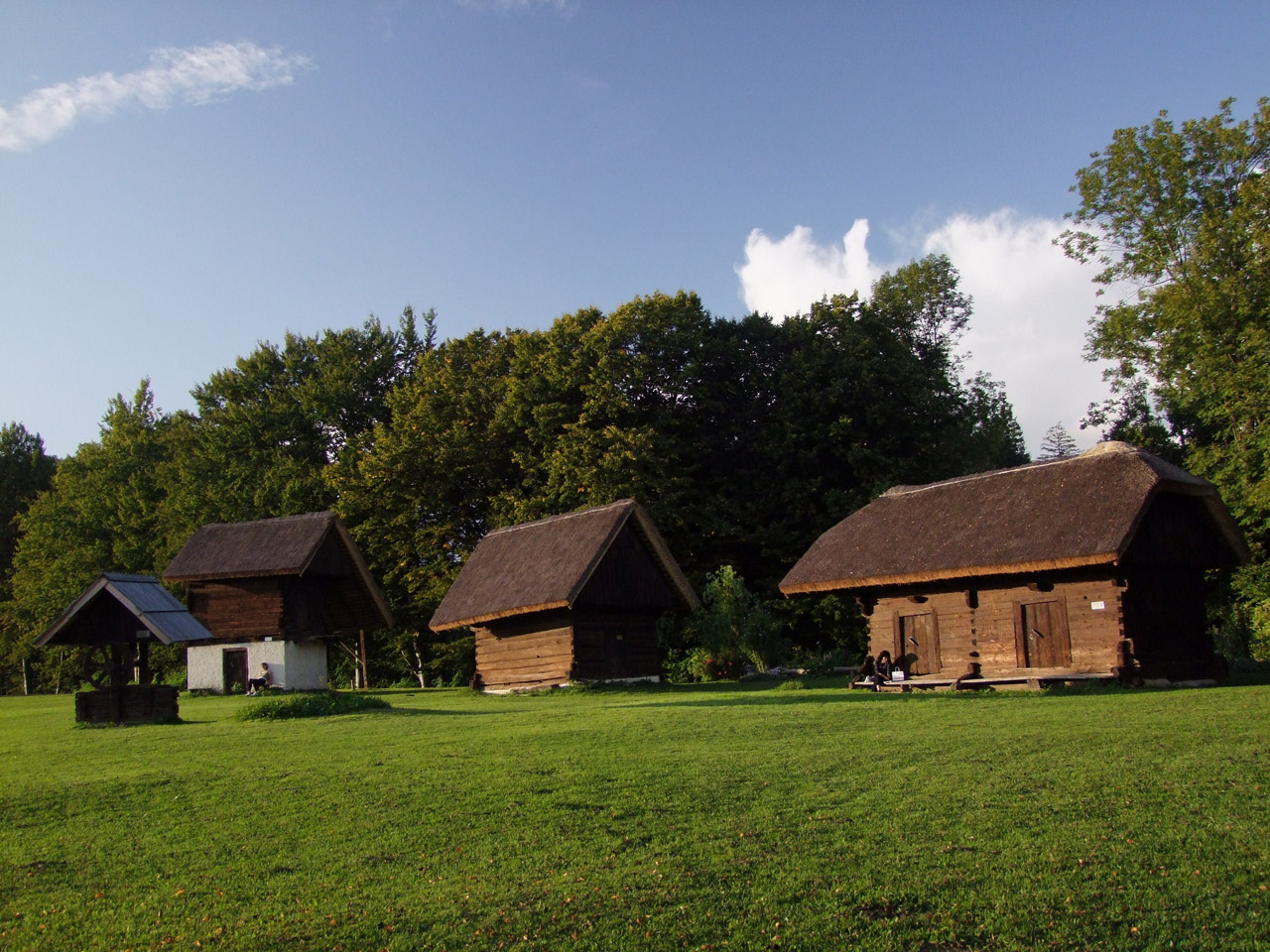
Part of the collection of granaries and other outbuildings of the Kamnik intermunicipal museum

The Kamnik Intermunicipal Museum was opened in the castle in 1961. The castle's salon was renovated in 1997 and serves as a venue for openings, lectures, concerts, and symposia. As of 2011, the museum had five main collections:

- Archaeology collection
- Ethnological collection
- Culture-Historical collection
- History of art collection
- History collection

Notable exhibitions in the main castle building include a display of Thonet bentwood furniture, a display about the 19th-century middle classes of Kamnik, a display of the pastoral heritage of the Big Pasture Plateau (Velika planina), and a lapidary collection. An object of special interest is a Baroque portative organ built by Marko Göbl and Johann Georg Eisl, both from Ljubljana, in 1743.
