= Marija Klobčar =

Slovenian ethnologist

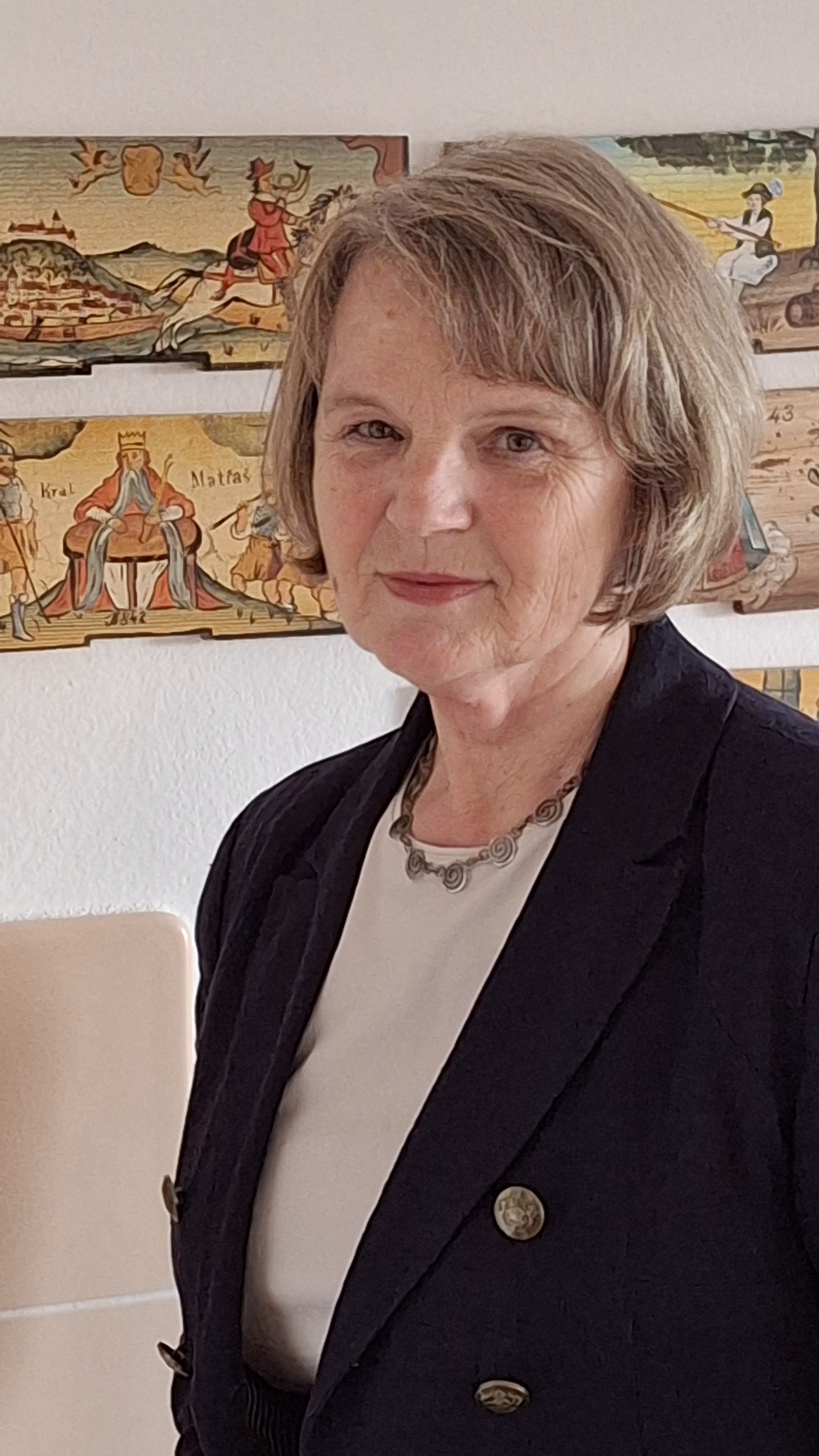
- Born: Marija Ftičar; Kamnik, Slovenia
- Education: University of Ljubljana
- Occupations: Ethnologist and folklorist

Marija Klobčar (née Ftičar) is a Slovenian ethnologist and folklorist. Her research includes the role of oral tradition in history and everyday life, and the activities of itinerant singers as the bearers of folksong creativity. She is a professor of Folklore Studies and Mythology at the University of Ljubljana.

== Biography ==
Klobčar was born in Kamnik, Slovenia, and graduated from the Faculty of Arts, University of Ljubljana, with bachelor's degree in Slavic Studies and Ethnology in 1982. She completed her master's degree in 1991 and her doctoral degree in 1997 in ethnology at the same university while she was employed at the Institute for the Protection of Natural and Cultural Heritage in Kranj. Her diploma thesis was titled Societies and events in Kamnik in the period between 1914 and 1941.

After graduating in 1983, she became employed as a researcher at the Department of Ethnology and Cultural Anthropology, Faculty of Arts, University of Ljubljana. After a short break for family reasons, she was employed in Kranj, and in 1998 at the ZRC SAZU (in English: Scientific Research Center of the Slovenian Academy of Sciences and Arts) at the University of Ljubljana, where she does her research and teaching at the Institute of Music and Ethnography.

The study of everyday life and culture of Slovenians, to which she devoted herself before joining the ZRC SAZU, also includes folkloristic research. With this approach, she addresses historical issues of folklore, the intertwining of the city and the countryside, various types of songs, such as narrative, military and ritual songs, bearers of song creativity, especially wandering singers, and interlingual intertwinings in song tradition. Her research on the connections between mythology and history is best expressed in new interpretations of Lake Kamnik, the earthquake of 1348, and the character of King Matjaž.

In presenting her with the Murka Award in 1999, the committee said she was a "a comprehensive research personality with a sensitive ear for interlocutors in the field" and cited: "Dare and curiosity broad-mindedness and breadth show her as a mature scientist, while her scientific vivacity testifies that the laureate's scientific path is a path of development, that she is still oriented towards new questions and insights, and that this is not the end of her life's work." The committee went on to note that "in addition to scientific monographs, numerous discussions and articles, there are also the award-winning author's thoughtful selections of folk songs from the archives of the Institute of Musical and Ethnographic Studies, which she collected on CDs."

Since 2020, she has been teaching about the Genesis of Slovenian Folkloristic Theory and Slovenian Oral Literature at the University of Ljubljana.

== Awards and recognitions ==
- Faculty Prešeren Award for her diploma thesis Society and Events in Kamnik 1914–1941 (1983)
- Murka Award for the monograph Kamnik residents between tradition and modernity (1999)
- Excellent in science for the monograph On the way to Kamnik (2017)
- Golden award of the Municipality of Kamnik (2017)
- Murka Lifetime Achievement Award (2020)
- Excellent in Science award for the monograph Listen to our protector (2021)

== Memberships ==
- International Ballad Commission
- SIEF Working Group on the Ritual Year
- Society for Slovene Studies
- Slovenian Ethnological Society
