= Zaprice, Kamnik =

Zaprice
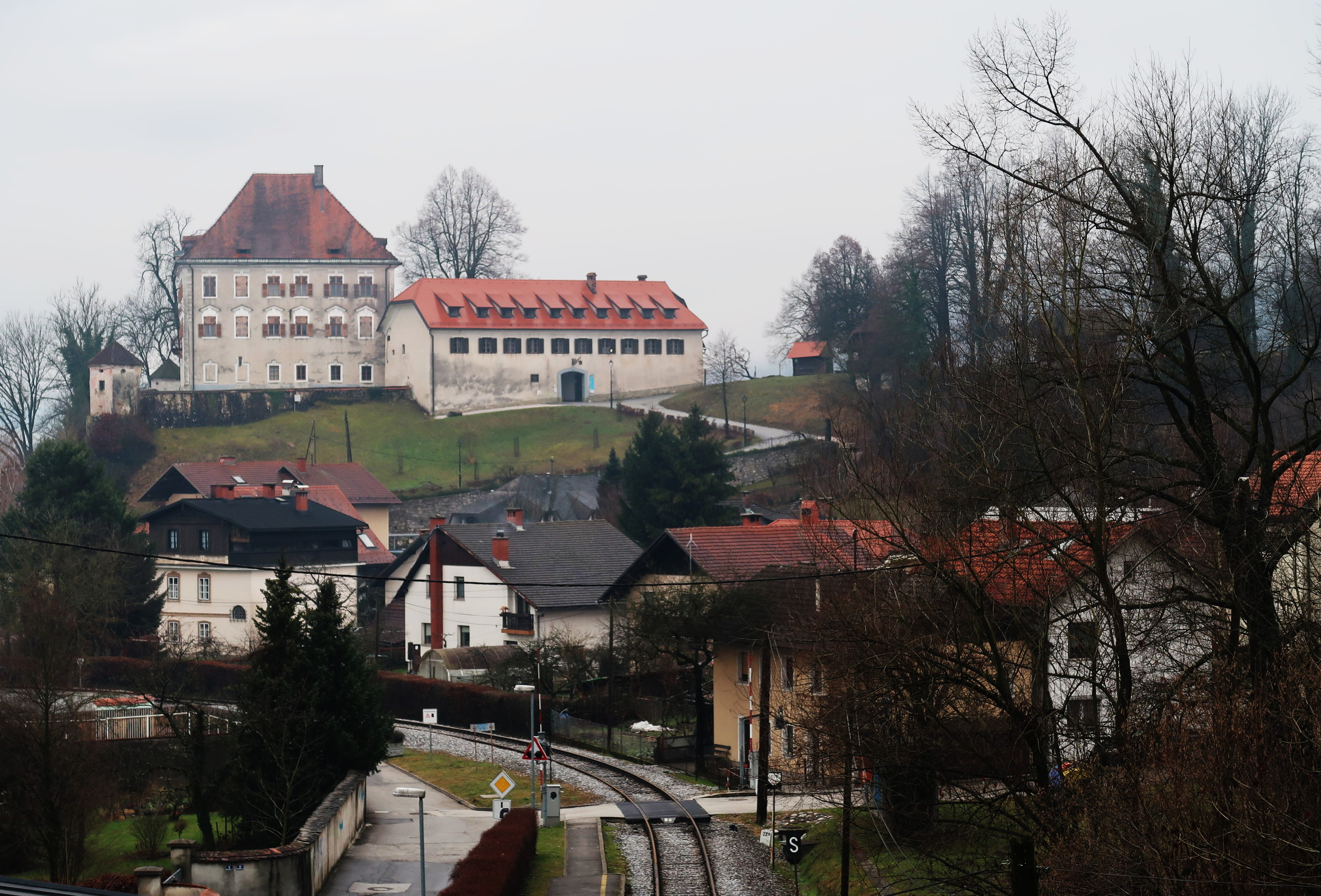

- Location in Slovenia
- Coordinates: 46°13′24″N 14°36′23″E
- Country: Slovenia
- Traditional region: Upper Carniola
- Statistical region: Central Slovenia
- Municipality: Kamnik
- Elevation: 379 m (1,243 ft)

Zaprice (pronounced [ˈzaːpɾitsɛ], German: Steinbüchel) is a former settlement in the Municipality of Kamnik in central Slovenia. It is now part of the town of Kamnik. The area is part of the traditional region of Upper Carniola. The municipality is now included in the Central Slovenia Statistical Region.

== Geography ==
Zaprice stands on a conglomerate terrace west of the town center of Kamnik. Smrekovec Hill (elevation: 475 meters or 1,558 feet) rises immediately west of the settlement.

== Name ==
Zaprice was attested in historical sources as Apetz and Apiz in 1301 and as Sapecz in 1438, among other spellings.

== History ==
Zaprice is dominated by Zaprice Castle, and the history of the village is closely connected with the castle. The village of Zaprice was annexed by Kamnik in 1934, ending its existence as an independent settlement.

== Notable people ==
Notable people that were born or lived in Zaprice include:

- Josef Schneid von Treuenfeld (1839–1884), Austrian nobleman and politician, purchased Zaprice Castle in 1878
- Fidelis Terpinc (1799–1875), industrialist and politician, purchased Zaprice Castle in 1871
