= Žale, Kamnik =

Žale
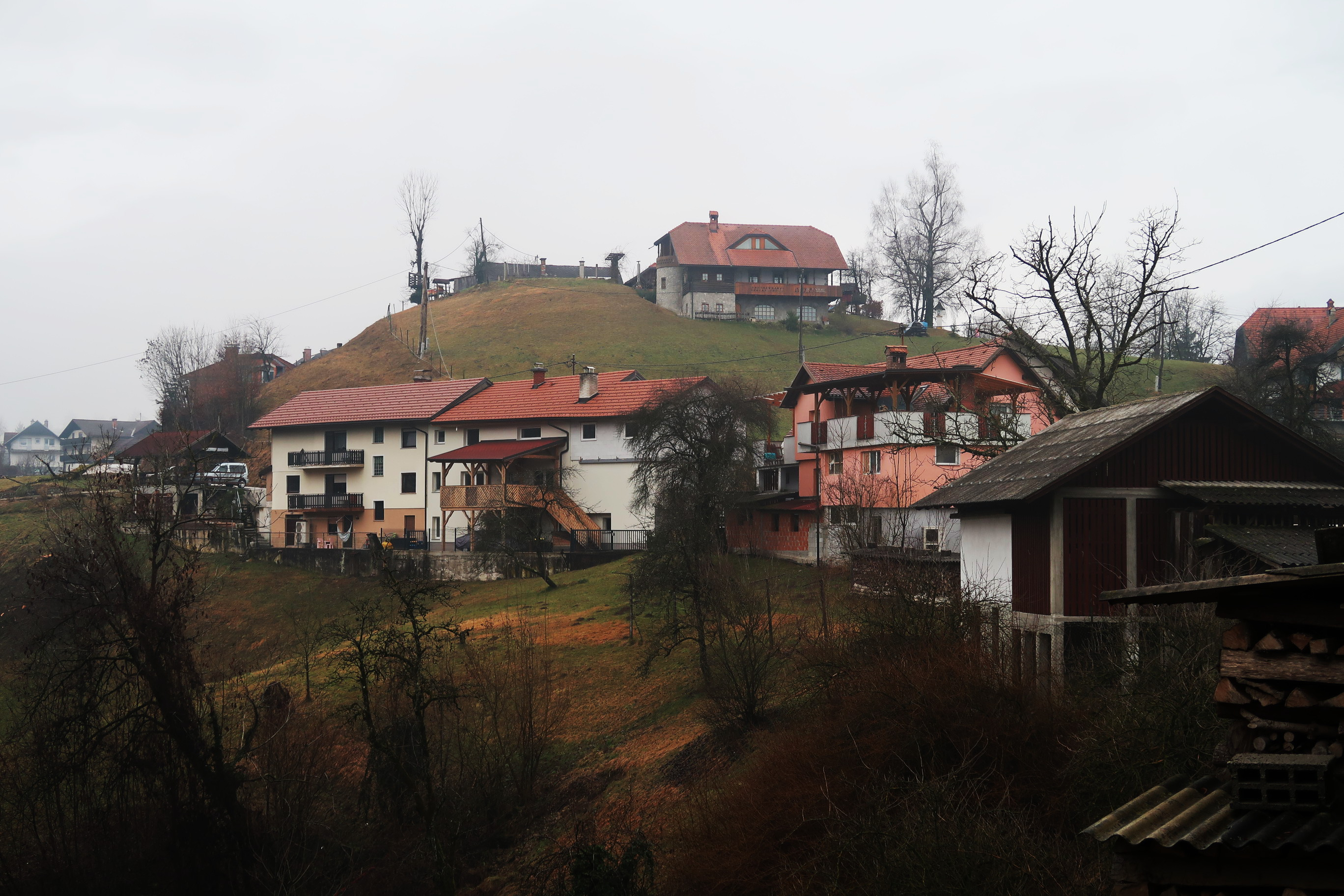

- Location in Slovenia
- Coordinates: 46°13′45″N 14°36′01″E
- Country: Slovenia
- Traditional region: Upper Carniola
- Statistical region: Central Slovenia
- Municipality: Kamnik
- Elevation: 466 m (1,529 ft)

Žale (pronounced [ˈʒaːlɛ], in older sources also Žalje, German: Sallenberg) is a former settlement in the Municipality of Kamnik in central Slovenia. It became part of the town of Kamnik. The area is part of the traditional region of Upper Carniola. The municipality is now included in the Central Slovenia Statistical Region.

== Geography ==
Žale lies northwest of Kamnik, in a valley south of the road to Tunjice. It includes Kamnik's town cemetery.

== Name ==
Žale was attested in historical sources as Saͤldenperg in 1309, Seldenperg in 1459, Sellenberg in 1491, and Selenperg in 1496.

== History ==
Žale was annexed by Kamnik in 1934, ending its existence as an independent settlement.

== Church ==
Saint Joseph's Church in Žale was built from 1677 to 1688. It was remodeled in the Baroque style in the first half or the 18th century by Maximilian Leopold Rasp (1673–1742), who also laid out the cemetery in Žale.
