= Bojan Kraut =

Bojan Kraut (April 12, 1908 – August 22, 1991) was a Slovene mechanical engineer who wrote "Strojniški Priročnik" (English: "Mechanical Engineering Handbook"), a well-known reference text from former Yugoslavia.

== Biography ==
Kraut was born in Kamnik where he finished elementary school. He finished Gymnasium in Ljubljana in 1926. In 1932 he became a mechanical engineer after graduating from Zagreb University.

After working in Tivat, he became a constructor in Ljubljana's foundry. In 1937 he became a teaching assistant at the Ljubljana University where he received title of "honorary engineer". His last job before the Second World War was in Slavonski Brod, where he worked as a leading constructor of locomotives and railcars.

After WW2 he contributed to the restoration of Yugoslav industry. He worked as a leading engineer at Tovarna avtomobilov Maribor and later became a technical director at the Litostroj machinery factory.

Finally he became a professor at the Ljubljana University and was elected for a Faculty Dean and a University Rector later.

In April 1954 he published "Strojniški Priročnik", a handbook for mechanical engineers. This handbook became popular among engineers from all parts of Yugoslavia and after Kraut's death in 1991 it was renamed to Krautov Strojniški Priročnik (Kraut's Mechanical Engineering Handbook). The Handbook is the best selling Slovenian scientific book ever.
