= Little Castle =

Castle in Kamnik, Slovenia

Coordinates: 46°13′28.44″N 14°36′43″E

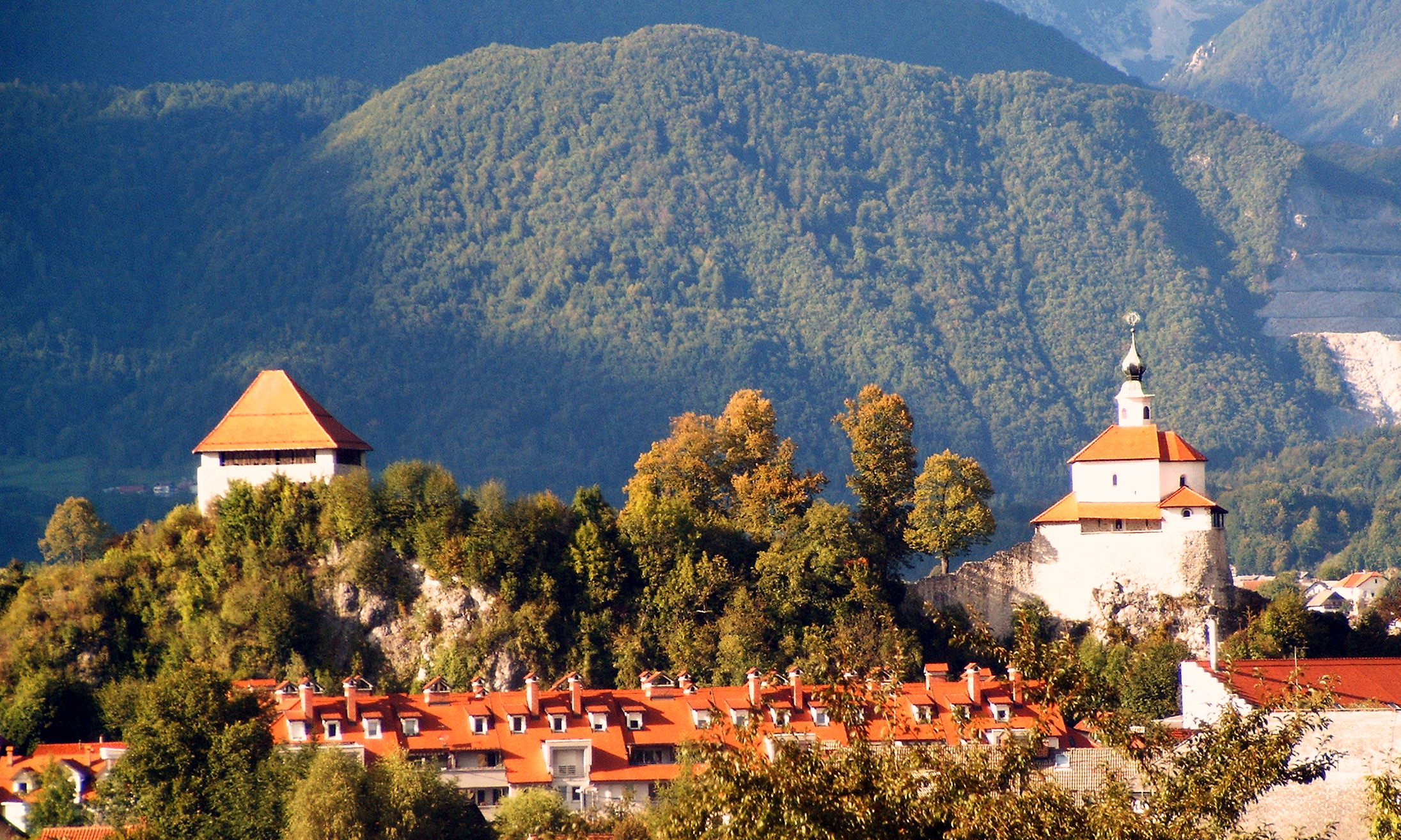
Little Castle complex above Kamnik viewed from the south-east with Kamnik-Savinja Alps visible in the background.

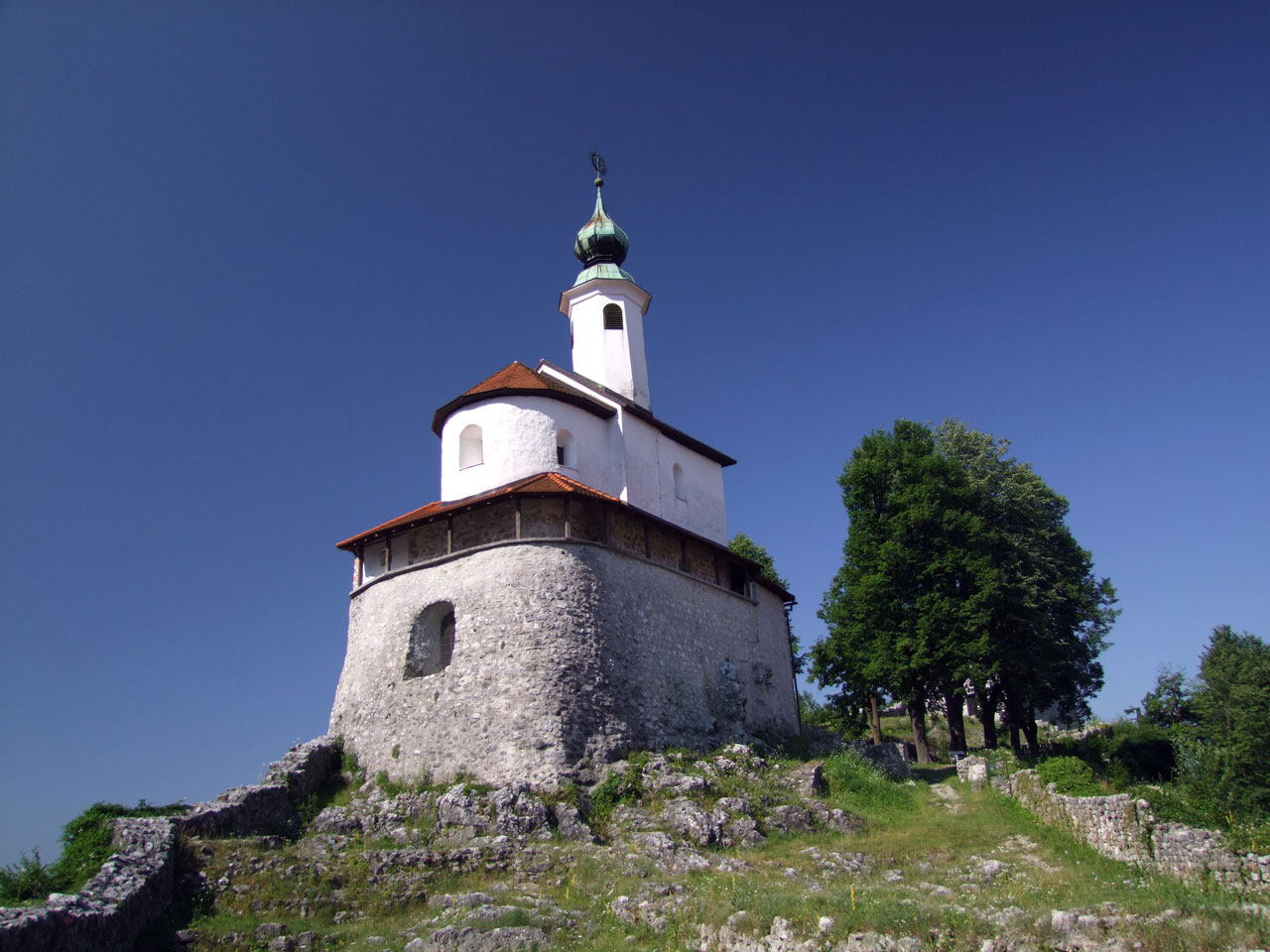
Little Castle chapel

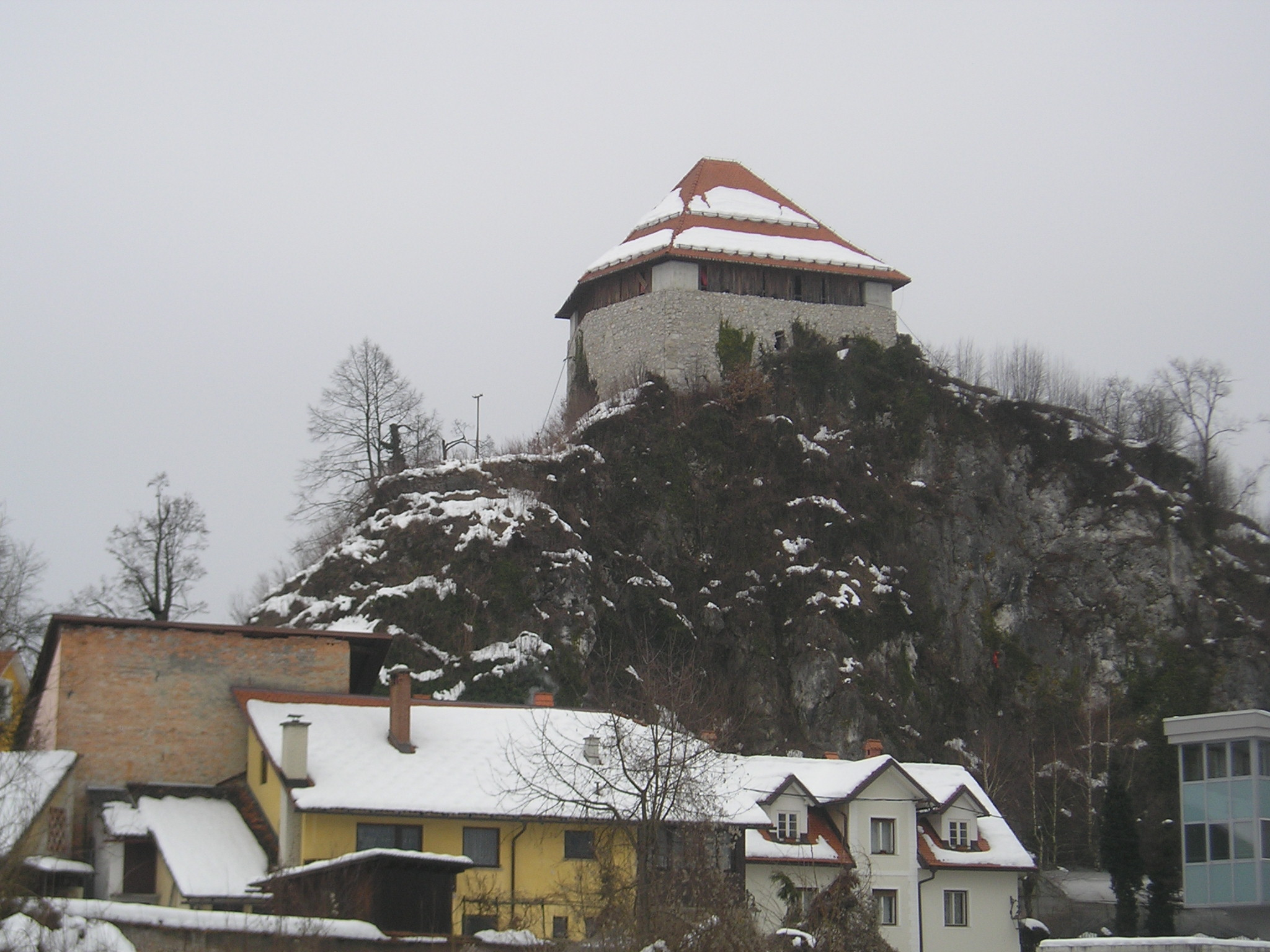
Little Castle defense tower

Little Castle (Slovene: Mali grad) in Kamnik, Slovenia, once formed part of a castle constructed in the 11th or early 12th century at the strategic site above the narrow passage near an important trail. The Romanesque chapel of St. Eligius is one of the most important Slovene medieval monuments, despite later alterations, and is one of the oldest of its kind in Europe. The chapel features a wooden ceiling and exquisite fresco paintings. Kamnik's Medieval Days festival takes place at the foot of the castle every June.

== History ==
Archaeological evidence indicates a cultic centre here in pre-Antiquity. The castle was first mentioned in 1202, but is of older origin. At the end of the 13th century, the castle burned; the northeast part was demolished and never rebuilt. The remainder of the castle was torn down in the 16th century after the 1511 Idrija earthquake, leaving only the three-storey Romanesque chapel built between the 11th and 15th centuries. One can still see the remnants of defensive walls and the recently restored defensive tower.

== Chapel ==
The first chapel of St. Margaret with a crypt, the presbytery of today's lower chapel, was built around 1100. When the nave was added, the Romanesque portal with a lunette was displaced. In the 13th century the chapel's second floor was built, dedicated to Bartholomew the Apostle, with a Gothic vault build after 1470. The lower chapel was than dedicated to St. Eligius, decorated again after 1771 with frescos by Janez Potočnik. The entire chapel was rebuilt in Baroque style around 1700. Inside there are also remnants of Gothic and Baroque frescos.

== A folk legend ==
Countess Veronika, who was stingy, once lived in Little Castle. One day three priests visited her, asking her for money to renovate the church. Veronika replied that she would rather turn into a snake than to give them money. No sooner had she finished speaking when lightning struck her and she became half snake and half human. She can only be saved by seven-year boy who will whip her three times on the back. In return, he will be given a treasure by her.
