= Fužine (Ljubljana) =

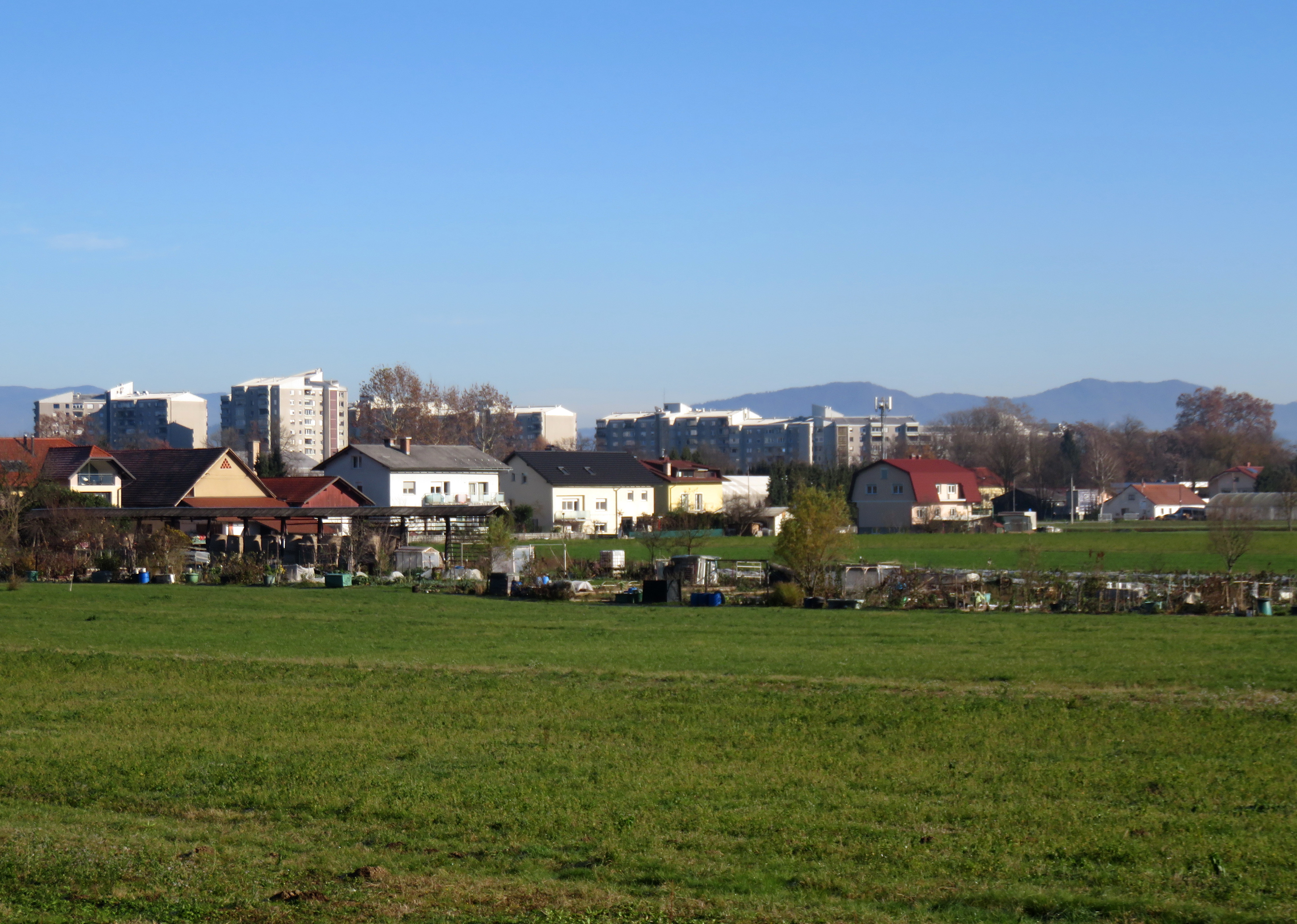

- Location in Slovenia
- Coordinates: 46°2′57″N 14°33′50″E
- Country: Slovenia
- Traditional region: Lower Carniola
- Statistical region: Central Slovenia
- Municipality: Ljubljana
- Elevation: 285 m (935 ft)

Fužine (pronounced [fuˈʒiːnɛ]; German: Fuschine) is a formerly independent settlement southeast of the capital Ljubljana in central Slovenia. It belongs to the City Municipality of Ljubljana. It is part of the traditional region of Lower Carniola and is now included with the rest of the municipality in the Central Slovenia Statistical Region.

== Geography ==
The village core of Fužine is a compact settlement on the right bank of the Ljubljanica River in Ljubljana's Golovec District. The soil is sandy, well-drained, and fertile, and fields lie to the south.

== Name ==
The name Fužine comes from the common noun fužina 'forge' (a borrowing from Friulian fusine), which referred to the ironworks established there by Hans Khisl in the 16th century.

== History ==
The early history of Fužine is closely tied to that of Fužine Castle on the left bank of the river. The castle was built in 1525 by Veit Khisl, who also served as the mayor of Ljubljana in 16th century. In addition to the ironworks, his son Hans Khisl also established a sawmill, grain mill, and paper mill in Fužine in the 16th century. In the early 19th century, the Pauer family operated mills there. The industrialist Fidelis Terpinz (1799–1875) established a tannin and dye factory in Fužine in 1843. A factory producing brushes was established in 1943. Fužine was annexed by Ljubljana in 1982, ending its existence as an independent settlement. Today the name Fužine is mostly associated with the Nove Fužine housing development and neighborhood, which was built north of the river in the Moste District between 1977 and 1981.

The village had a population of 63 (in 12 houses) in 1880, 106 (in 19 houses) in 1900, 195 (in 20 houses) in 1931, and 236 (in 25 houses) in 1961.

== Notable people ==
Notable people that were born or lived in Fužine include:

- Hans Khisl (died 1587), industrialist
- Vinko Novak (1842–1923), painter
- Maks Rožman (1898–1970), technical writer and journalist
