= Elizabeth S. Selden =

American writer (1887–1970)

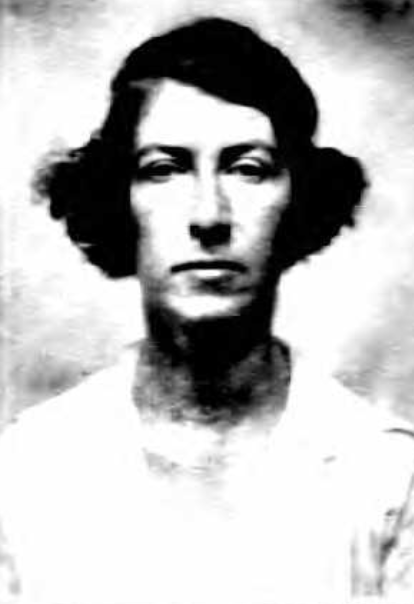
- Elizabeth S. Selden, from her 1921 application for a United States passport
- Born: Elizabeth Schmidinger; August 3, 1887; Stein, Carniola, Austrian Empire (now Kamnik, Slovenia)
- Died: September 1970 (aged 83)
- Occupations: Choreographer, dance scholar
- Notable work: The Dancer's Quest: Essays on the Aesthetic of Contemporary Dance (1935)

Elizabeth Schmidinger Selden (August 3, 1887 – September 1970) was an Austrian-born American dancer, lecturer, and writer, author of The Dancer's Quest: Essays on the Aesthetic of Contemporary Dance (1935) and Elements of the Free Dance (1930). After World War II, she wrote and spoke on international friendship and peace.

== Early life and education ==
Elizabeth Schmidinger was born in Stein, Carniola in the Austrian Empire (now known as Kamnik in Slovenia), the daughter of Karl Schmidinger. She moved to the United States in the 1915. Artist Walter Pach signed her petition for naturalization as a United States citizen in 1920. She changed her surname in the process of naturalization, and made a note to that effect in her application for a United States passport in 1921.

She studied languages and modern dance in Europe and New York. She earned a bachelor's degree in 1935, and a master's degree in German in 1937, both from the University of California, Berkeley. Her master's thesis was titled "The German interest in Chinese culture and its bearing on the poetry of the late Romantic period, as expressed in Goethe's Chinesisch-deutsche Jahres und Tageszeiten and in Rückert's Schi-King".

== Career ==
Selden was a dancer, writer, and lecturer, based in New York, New Jersey, and Connecticut in the 1910s and 1920s, and in California in the 1930s and 1940s. She was a member of the Concert Dancers League of New York. She traveled to back Germany several times for research. In addition to her books on dance, she also wrote and spoke on European fascinations with East Asian cultures, and was active in international activities at the University of California and in Oakland. "For the first time in history," she wrote in 1947, "at least the physical obstacles to world friendship have been removed."

== Publications ==
- "Sonntagsberg" (1922)
- Elements of the Free Dance (1930)
- The Dancer's Quest: Essays on the Aesthetic of Contemporary Dance (1935)
- China in German Poetry from 1773 to 1833 (1942)
- The Book of Friendship: An International Anthology (1947, compiled and translated by Selden)

== Personal life and legacy ==
Selden died in 1970, at the age of 83. The University of California, Irvine, holds a small collection of Selden's papers. Stanford University's Hoover Institution Library also holds a small collection of Selden's papers.
