= Fužine, Kamnik =

Fužine
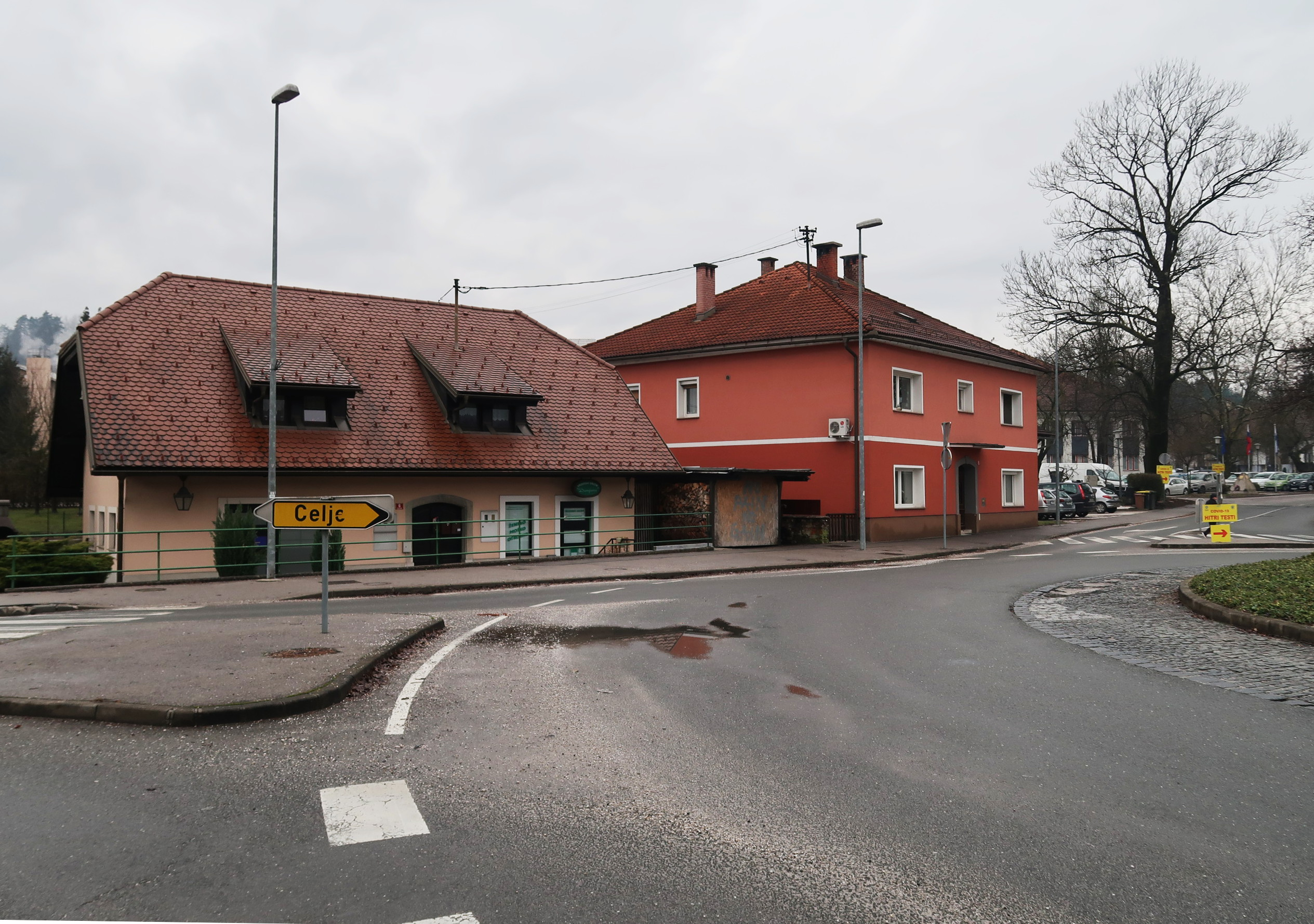

- Location in Slovenia
- Coordinates: 46°13′54″N 14°36′35″E
- Country: Slovenia
- Traditional region: Upper Carniola
- Statistical region: Central Slovenia
- Municipality: Kamnik
- Elevation: 385 m (1,263 ft)

Fužine (pronounced [fuˈʒiːnɛ]; German: Fuschine) is a former settlement in the Municipality of Kamnik in central Slovenia. It is now part of the town of Kamnik. The area is part of the traditional region of Upper Carniola. The municipality is now included in the Central Slovenia Statistical Region.

== Geography ==
Fužine lies north of Kamnik, on the right bank of the Kamnik Bistrica River.

== Name ==
The name Fužine comes from the common noun fužina 'forge' (a borrowing from Friulian fusine), which referred to the former ironworks there.

== History ==
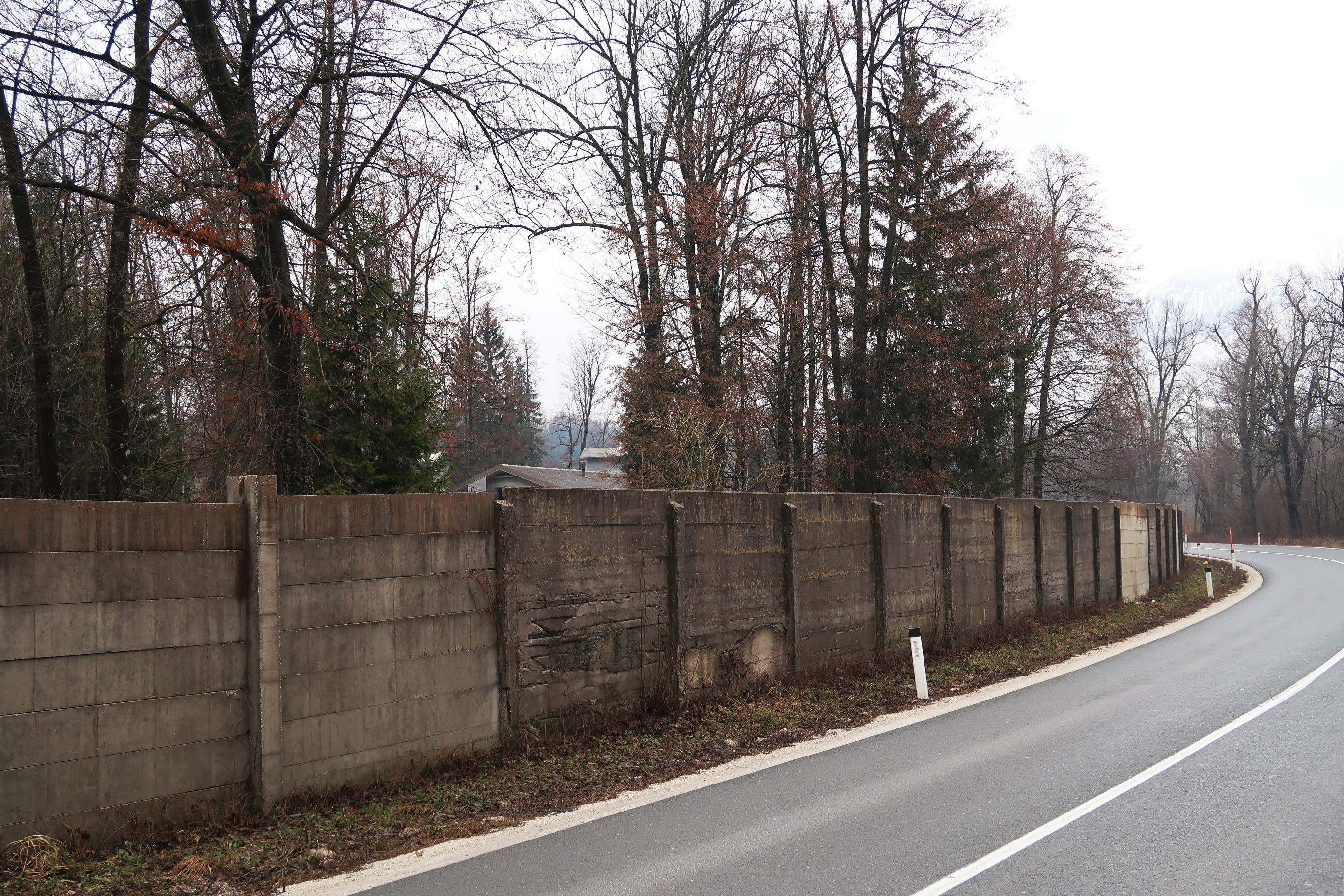
Part of the wall around the former gunpowder factory in Fužine

The roots of the ironworks in Fužine go back to a permit issued in 1603 to mine iron ore in the area, and the ironworks were established by Joseph Shigan (Slovene: Jožef Žigan) in 1735. The last owner of the ironworks was Edmund von Andrioli (1796–1861), who purchased the facility in 1833. The operations became economically unviable after the economic reforms following the Revolutions of 1848 and when Kamnik acquired a railroad connection 1849, and Andrioli sold the works to the military in 1853. The Austrian army had seized the gunpowder factory in Mantua, Italy in 1849 and transported the equipment to Fužine, and it then converted the former ironworks into a gunpowder factory in 1853. Fužine was annexed by Kamnik in 1934, ending its existence as an independent settlement.
