= Kamnik =

- Town
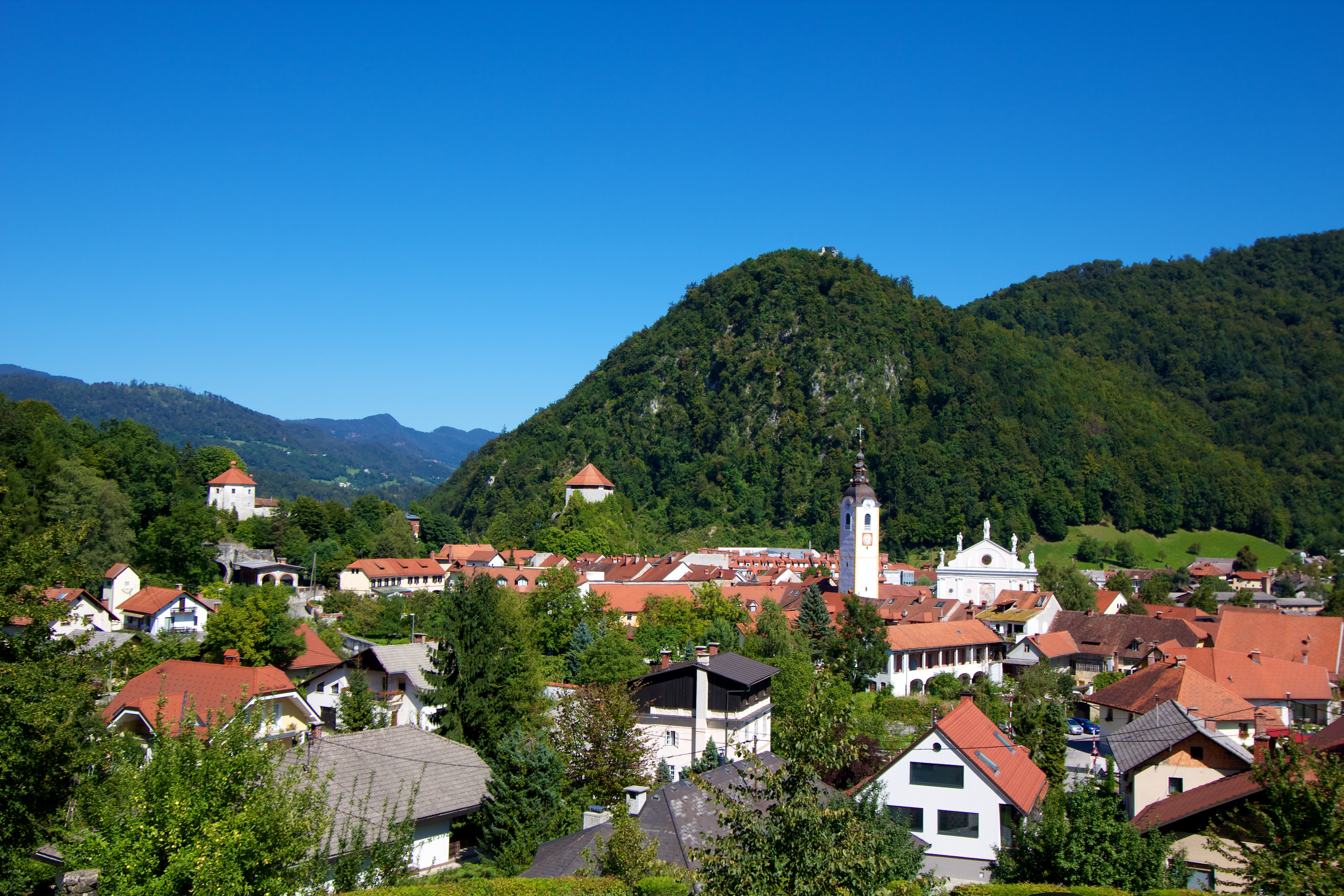
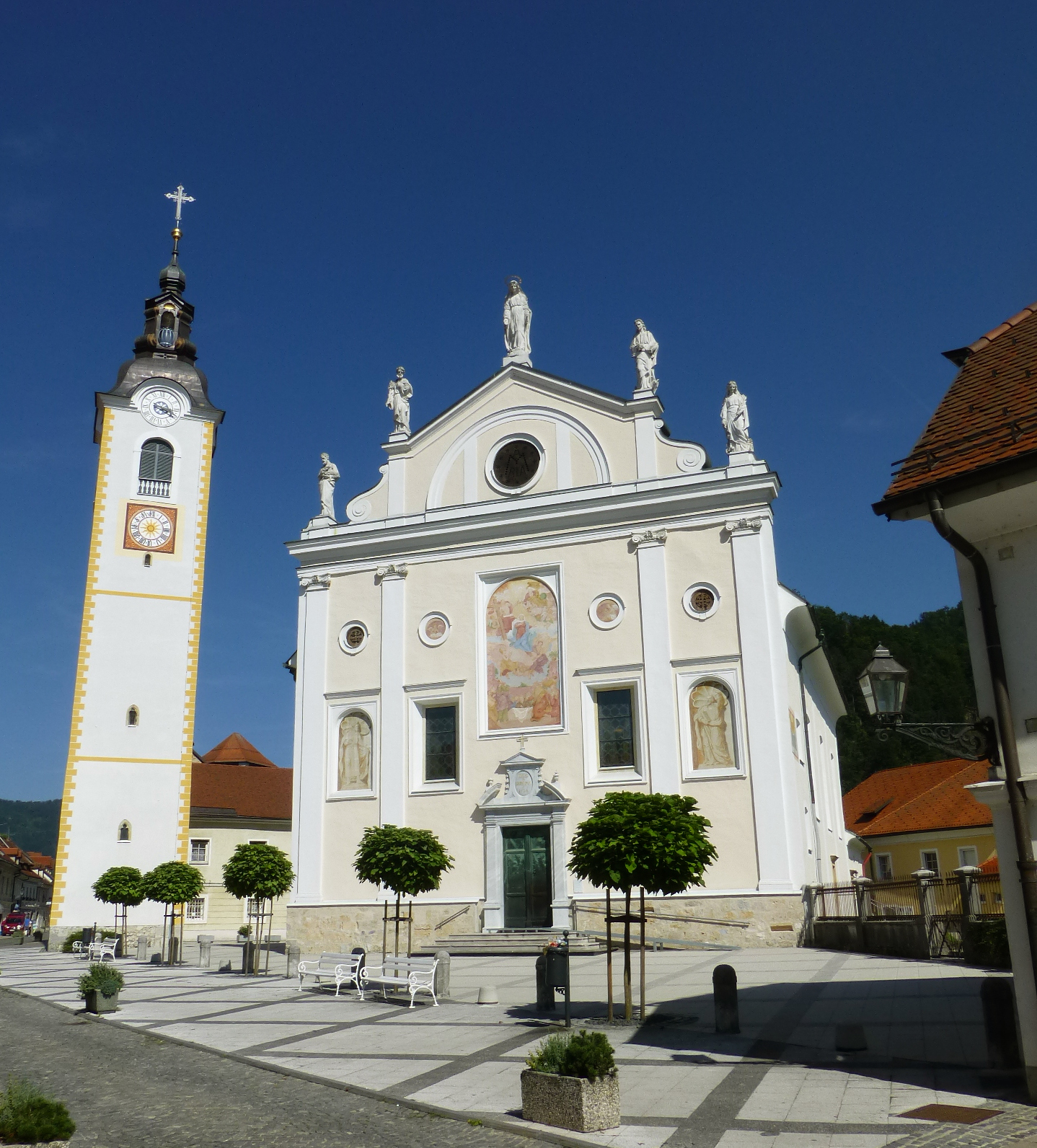
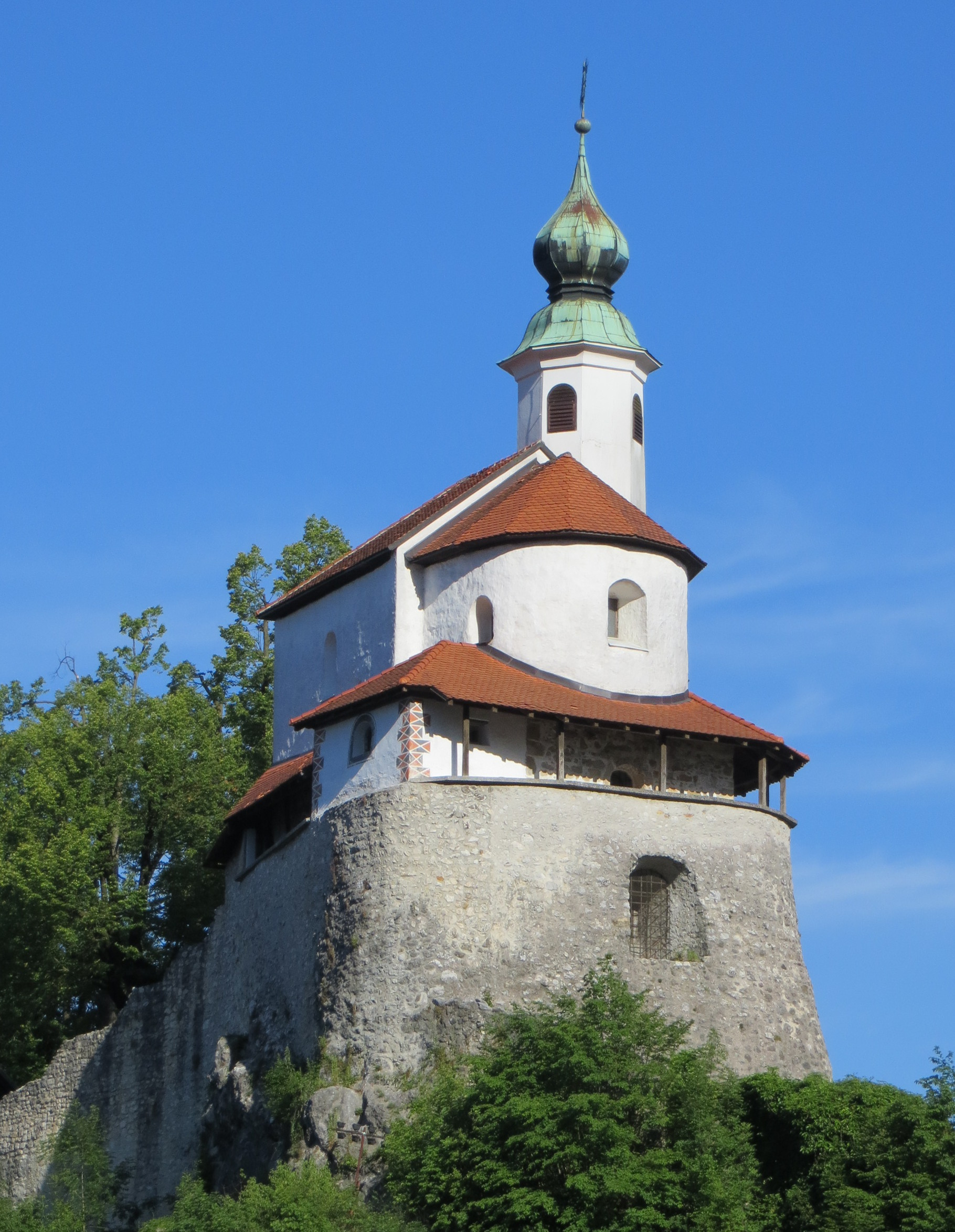
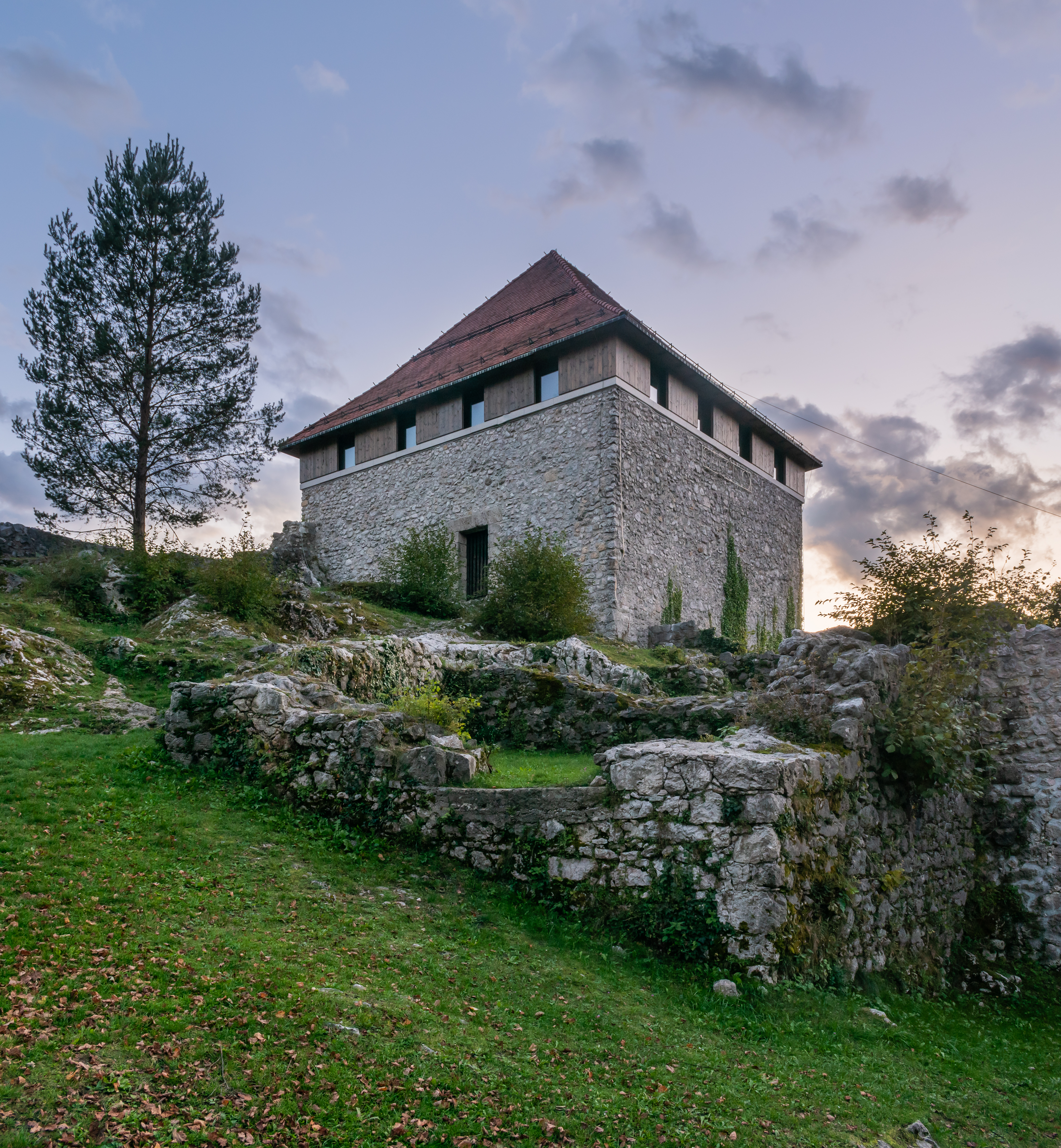
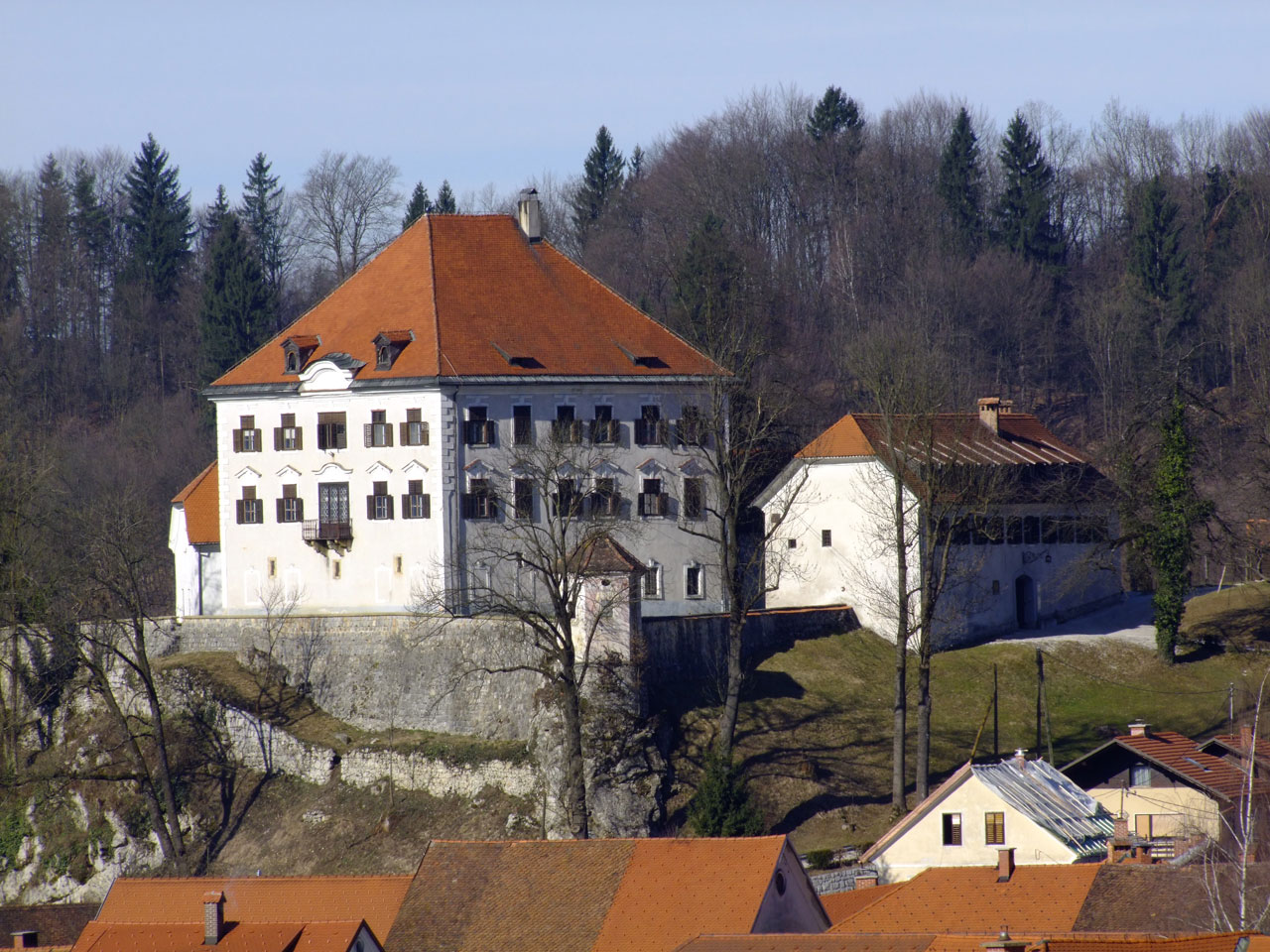
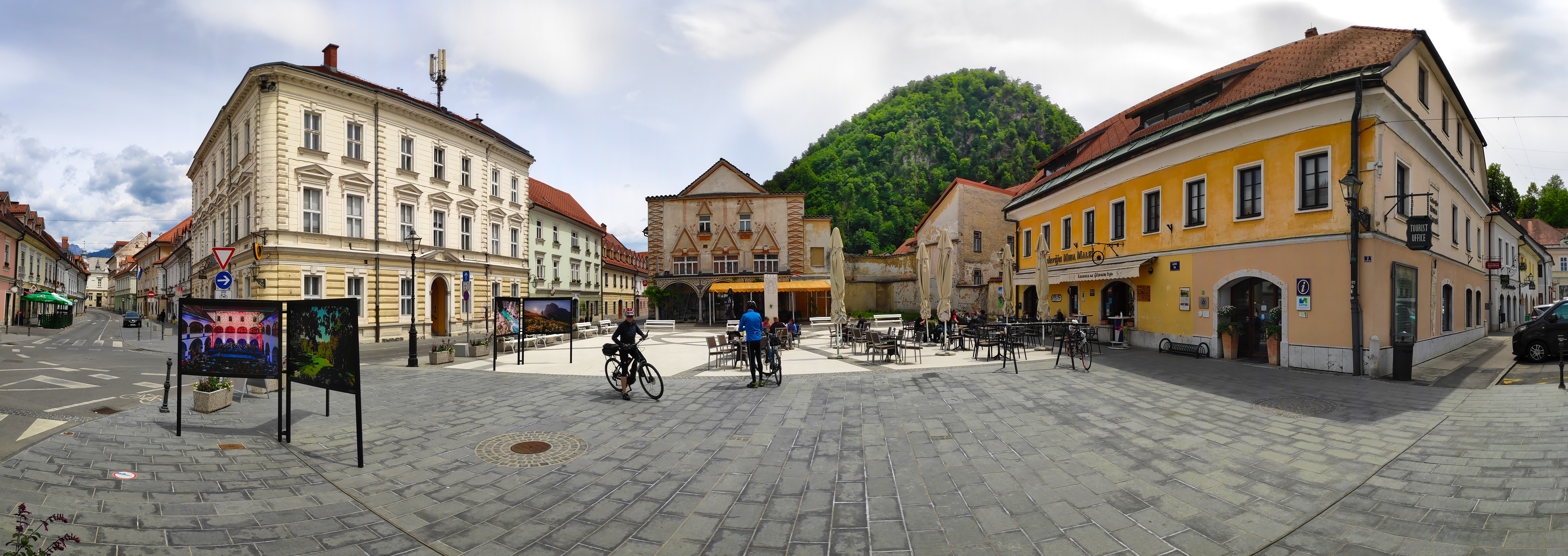
- From top, left to right: Old town – south, Immaculate Conception Parish Church, Little Castle Chapel, Little Castle Defense Tower, Zaprice Castle, Main Square

- Flag Coat of arms

- Location of Kamnik in Slovenia
- Coordinates: 46°13′32.69″N 14°36′43.14″E
- Country: Slovenia
- Traditional region: Upper Carniola
- Statistical region: Central Slovenia
- Municipality: Kamnik

Area
  - Total: 9.1 km^{2} (3.5 sq mi)
- Elevation: 380.5 m (1,248 ft)

Population (2016)
  - Total: 13,768
  - Density: 1,513/km^{2} (3,920/sq mi)
- Time zone: UTC+01 (CET)
  - Summer (DST): UTC+02 (CEST)
- Postal codes: 1240 and 1241
- Vehicle registration: LJ
- Website: visitkamnik.com

Kamnik (pronounced [ˈkáːmnik]; German: Stein or Stein in Oberkrain) is the ninth-largest town of Slovenia, located in the traditional province of Upper Carniola (northern Slovenia). It is the seat of the Municipality of Kamnik, which encompasses a large part of the Kamnik Alps and the surrounding area. The town of Kamnik has three castles as well as many examples of historical architecture.

== History ==
The name Kamnik was first mentioned in the 11th century. The first time it was mentioned as a town was in 1229, when it was an important trading post on the road between Ljubljana and Celje. This makes the town one of the oldest in Slovenia. In the Middle Ages, Kamnik had its own mint and some aristocratic families among its residents. The town was among the most influential centers of power for the Bavarian counts of Andechs in the region of Carniola at the time. The only remnant of the Bavarian nobility are the two ruined castles which are both strategically built on high ground near the town center. The Franciscan monastery built in the town itself is a testament to its importance. The building is well preserved and has undergone extensive renovation in recent years.

Historical suburbs of the town include Šut(i)na (German: Schutt), Na Produ (Slovene: Na produ), Novi Trg (Novi trg, German: Neumarkt), Pred Mostom (Pred mostom, German: Vor der Brücke), Graben, and Podgoro. In 1934 the following formerly independent settlements were annexed by Kamnik: Fužine (German: Fuschine), Žale (in older sources also Žalje, German: Sallenberg), Zaprice (German: Steinbüchel), Kratno, Pugled, Zgornje Perovo (German: Oberperau), Spodnje Perovo (German: Unterperau), Bakovnik, and the lower part of Mekinje.

Most of the old town center is built in an Austro-Hungarian style. Most of the facades have been renovated in recent years but the process is still ongoing.

=== Mass grave ===
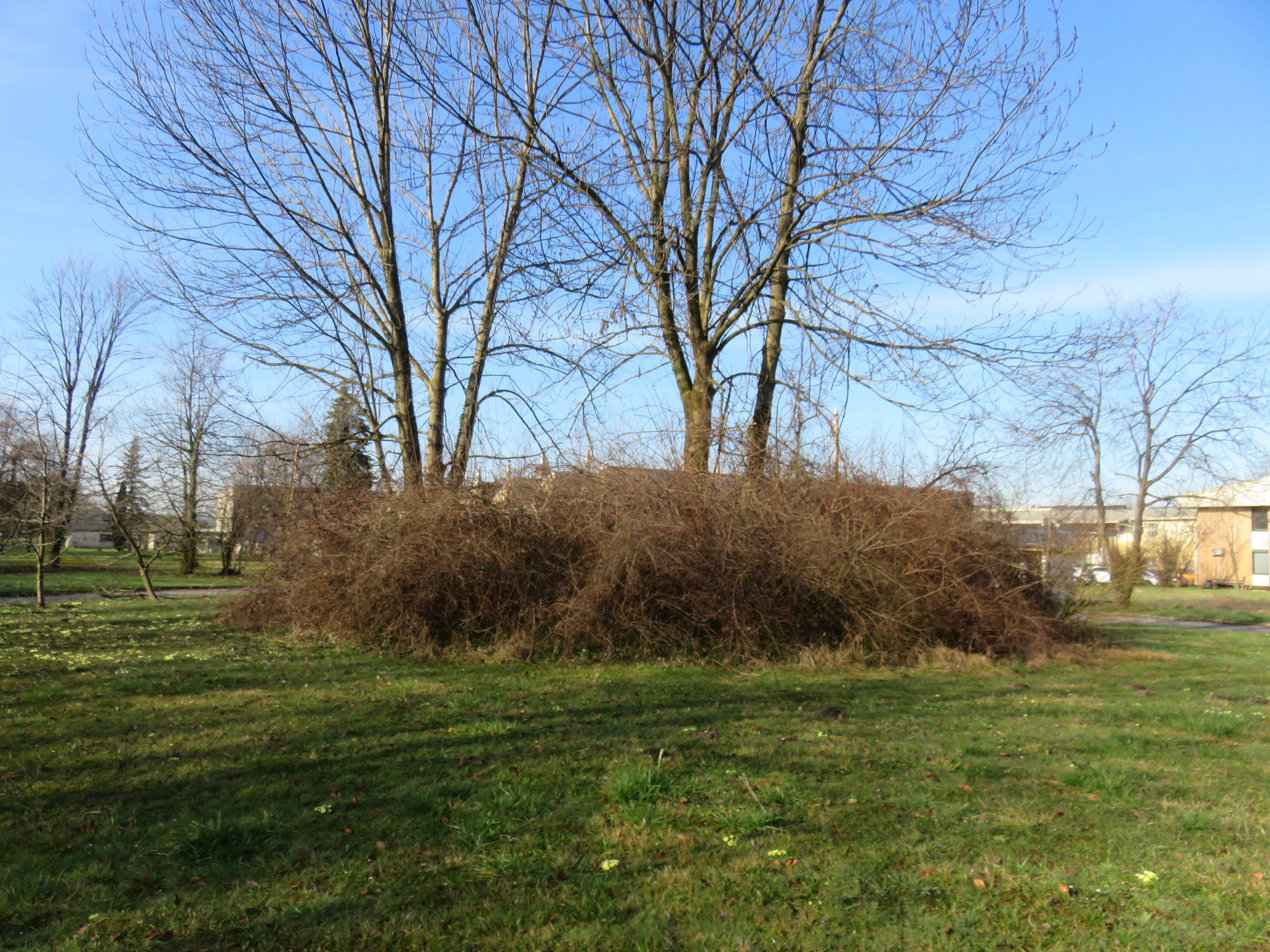
The Cuzak Meadow Mass Grave

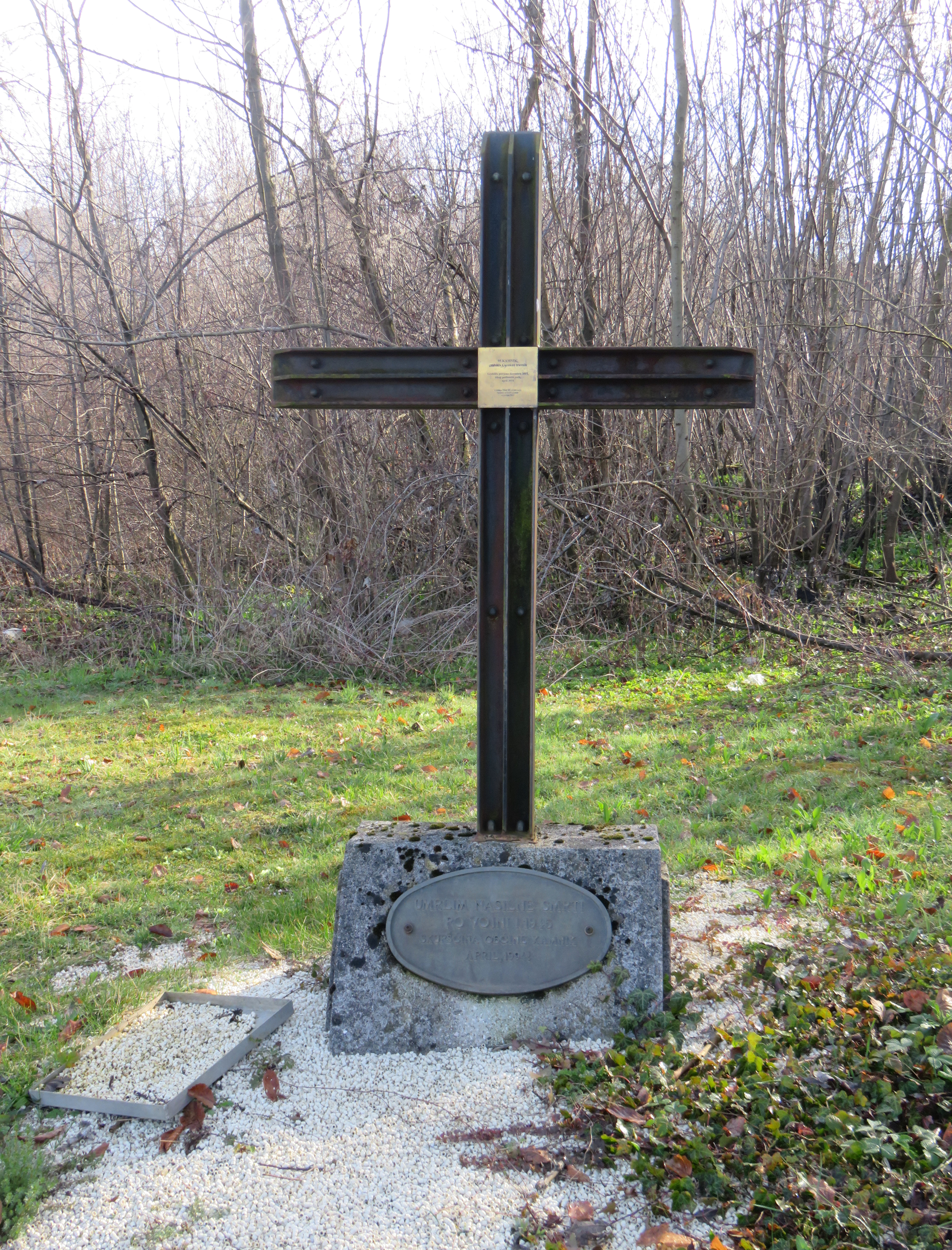
Cross with plaque

Kamnik is the site of a mass grave from the period immediately after the Second World War. The Cuzak Meadow Mass Grave (Slovene: Grobišče Cuzakov travnik) is located in the southeast part of the town, in a grassy area encircled by a road on the premises of the Svit factory. The grave contains the remains of several hundred soldiers and civilians, mostly Croats but also some Serbs, that were murdered on 11 May 1945.

== Notable people ==
Notable people that were born or lived in Kamnik include:

- Fran Albreht (1889–1963), author
- France Balantič (1921–1943), poet
- Jessie Case Vesel (1855–1937), English painter
- Jurij Japelj (1744–1807), philologist
- Marija Klobčar, ethnology scholar
- Rudolf Maister (1874–1934), military leader
- Neli Niklsbacher Bregar (1912–1982), embroiderer, ethnologist, and author
- Elizabeth S. Selden (1887–1970), dancer and writer
- Jakob Savinšek (1922–1961), sculptor and illustrator
- Bojan Kraut (1908–1991), engineer
- Anton Cerer (1916–2006), swimmer
- Marjan Šarec (born 1977), politician and actor

== International relations ==
=== Twin towns and sister cities ===
Kamnik is twinned with:

- Andechs, Germany
- Budva, Montenegro
- Trofaiach, Austria

== Gallery ==
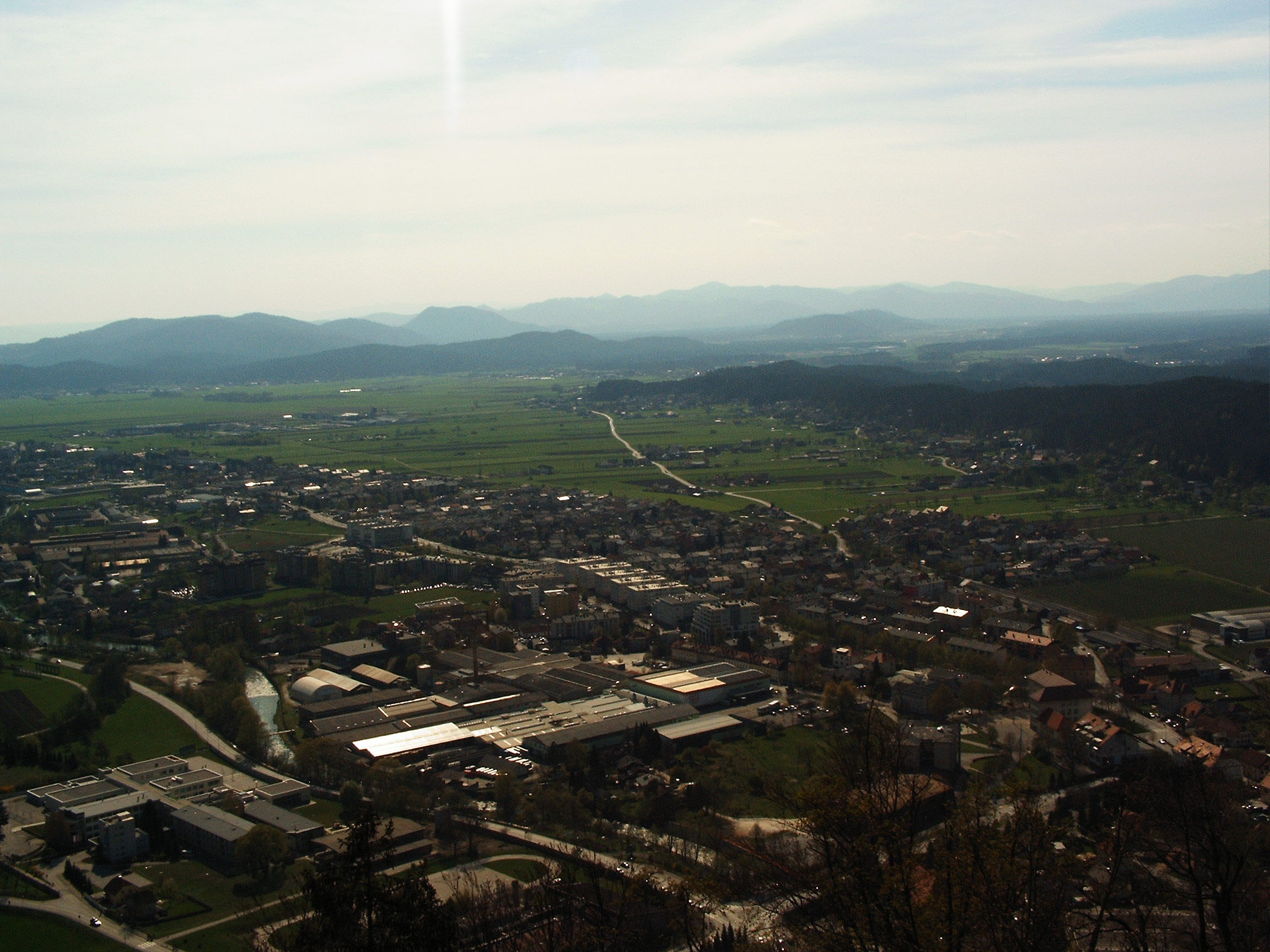
Southern part of Kamnik with suburbs

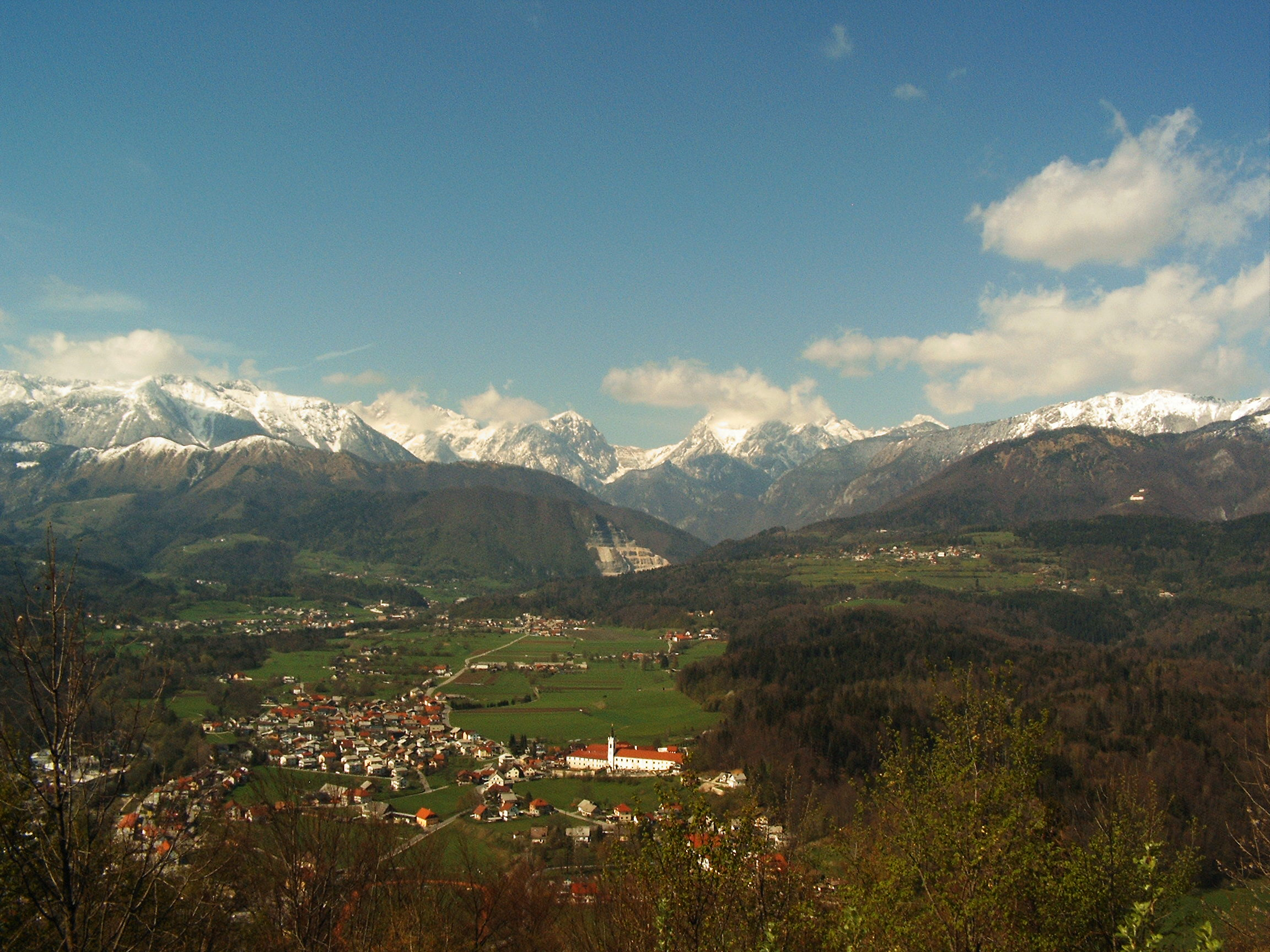
Kamnik's northern suburbs with the Kamnik–Savinja Alps in the background

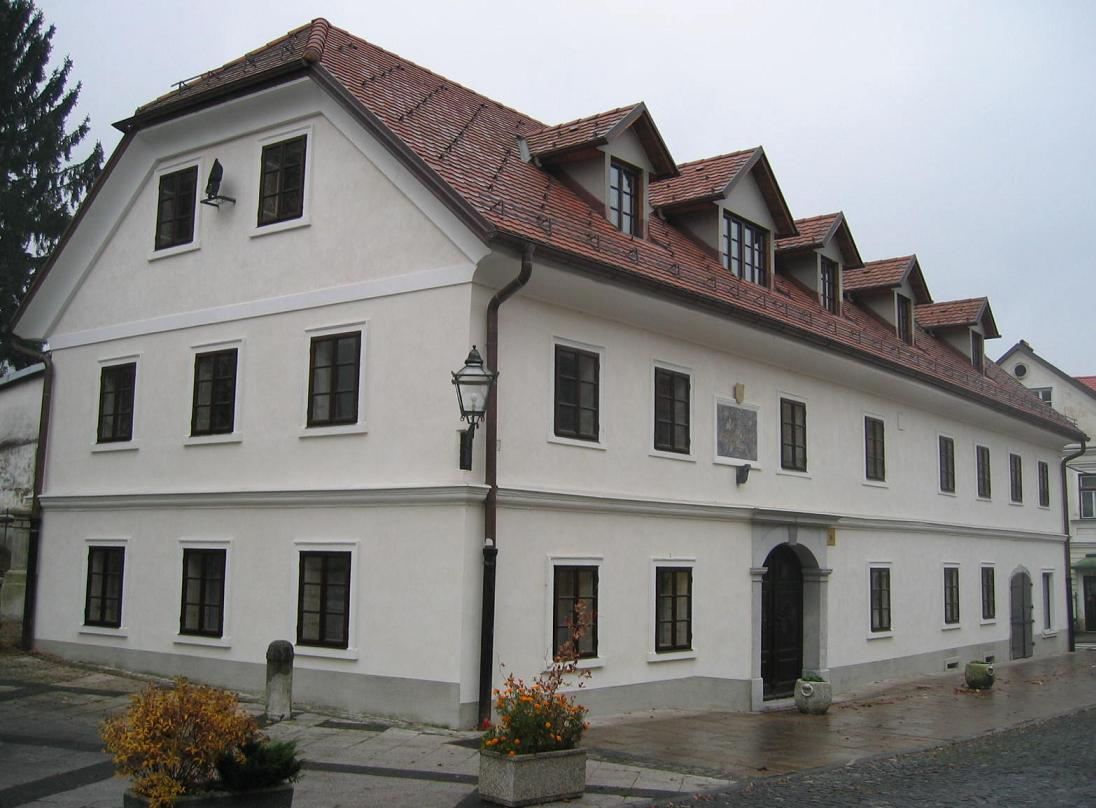
House where Rudolf Maister was born

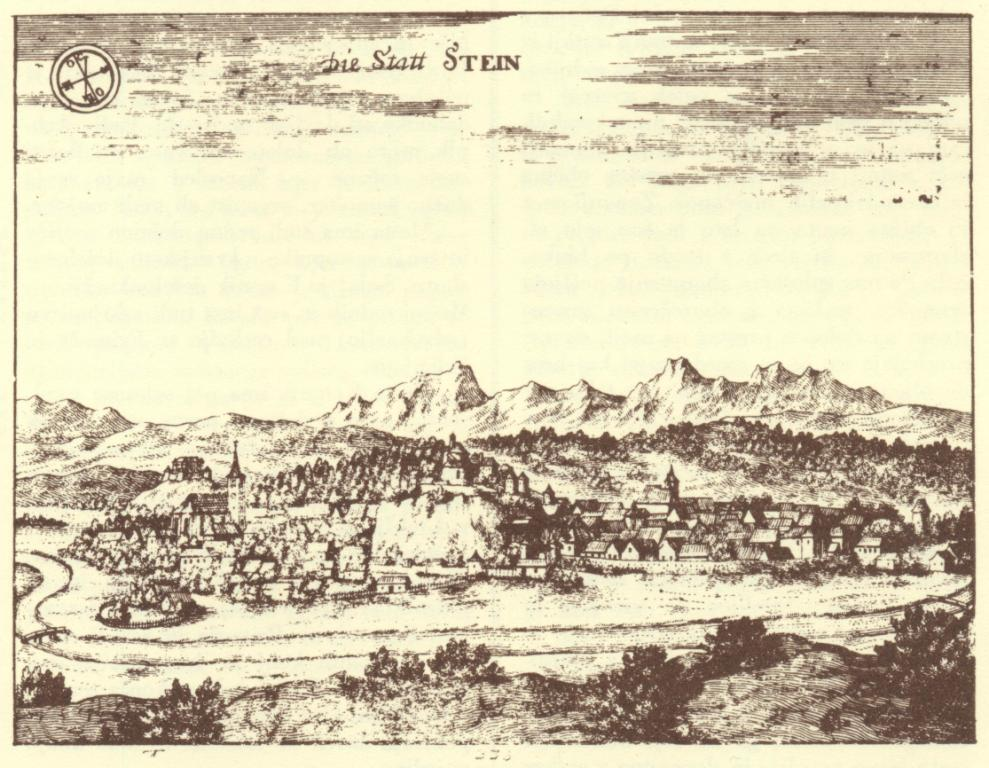
A copper engraving of Kamnik in 1689

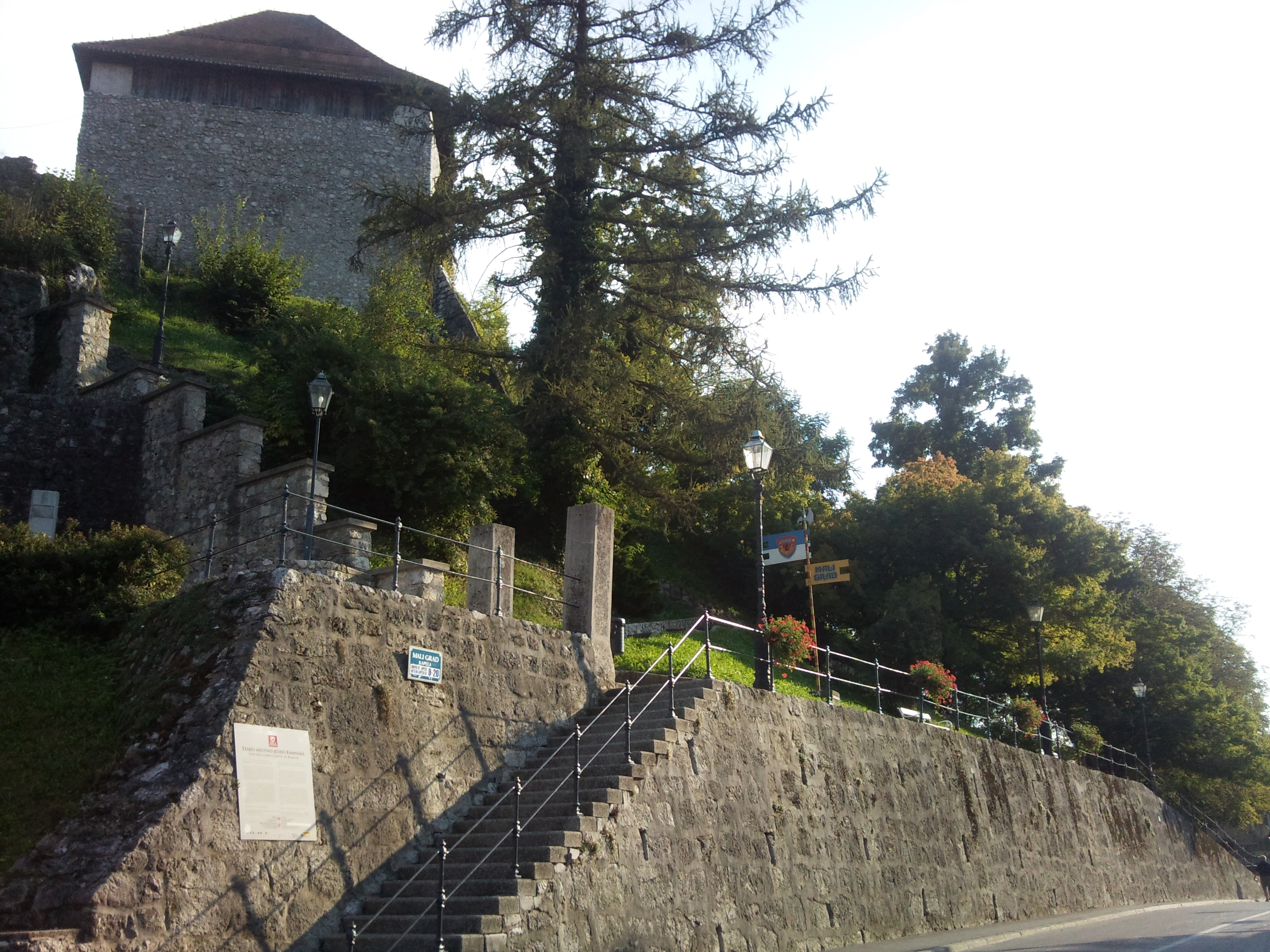
Little Castle

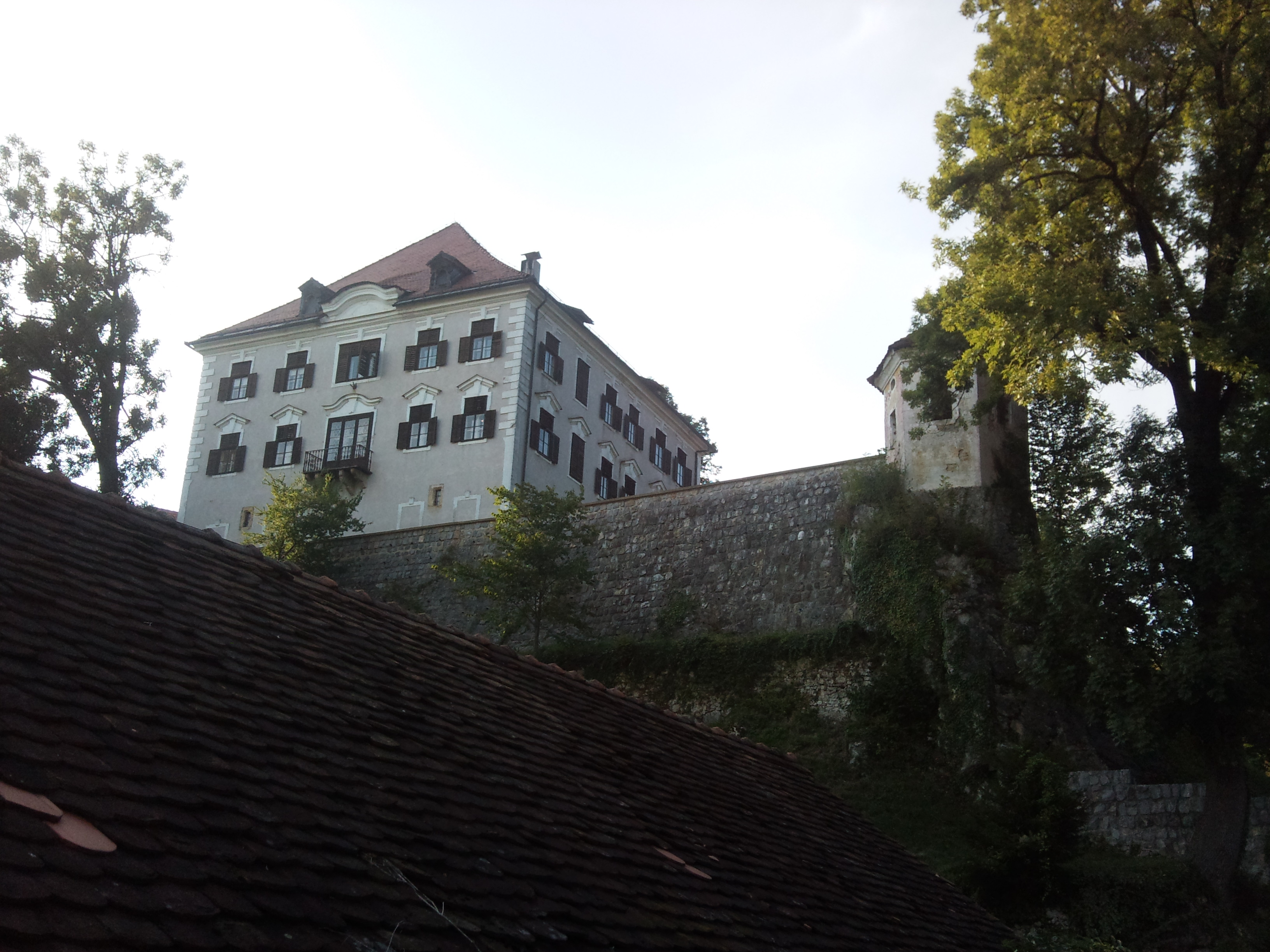
Zaprice Castle

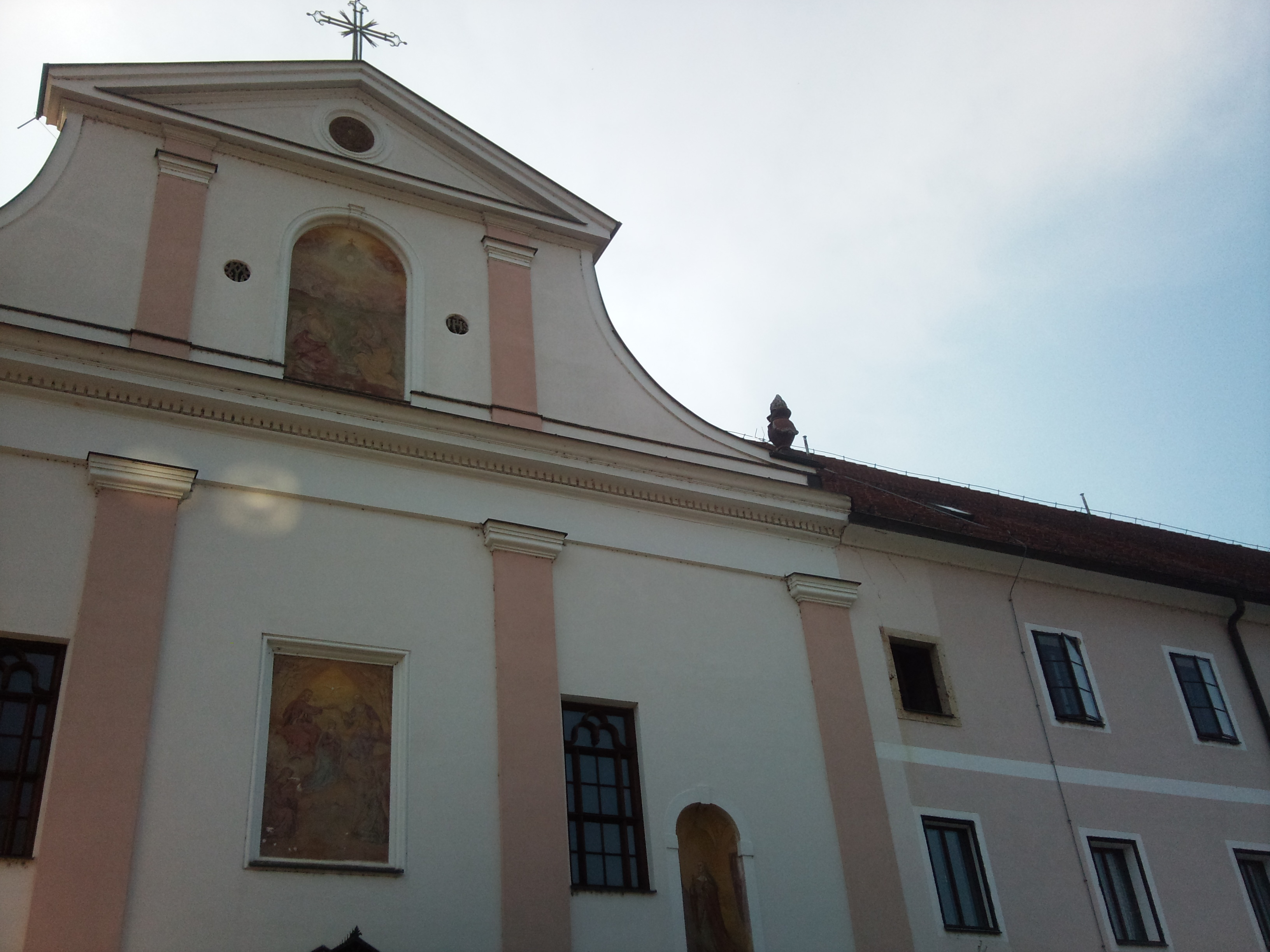
Franciscan monastery
