= Kamniška Bistrica, Kamnik =

Kamniška Bistrica
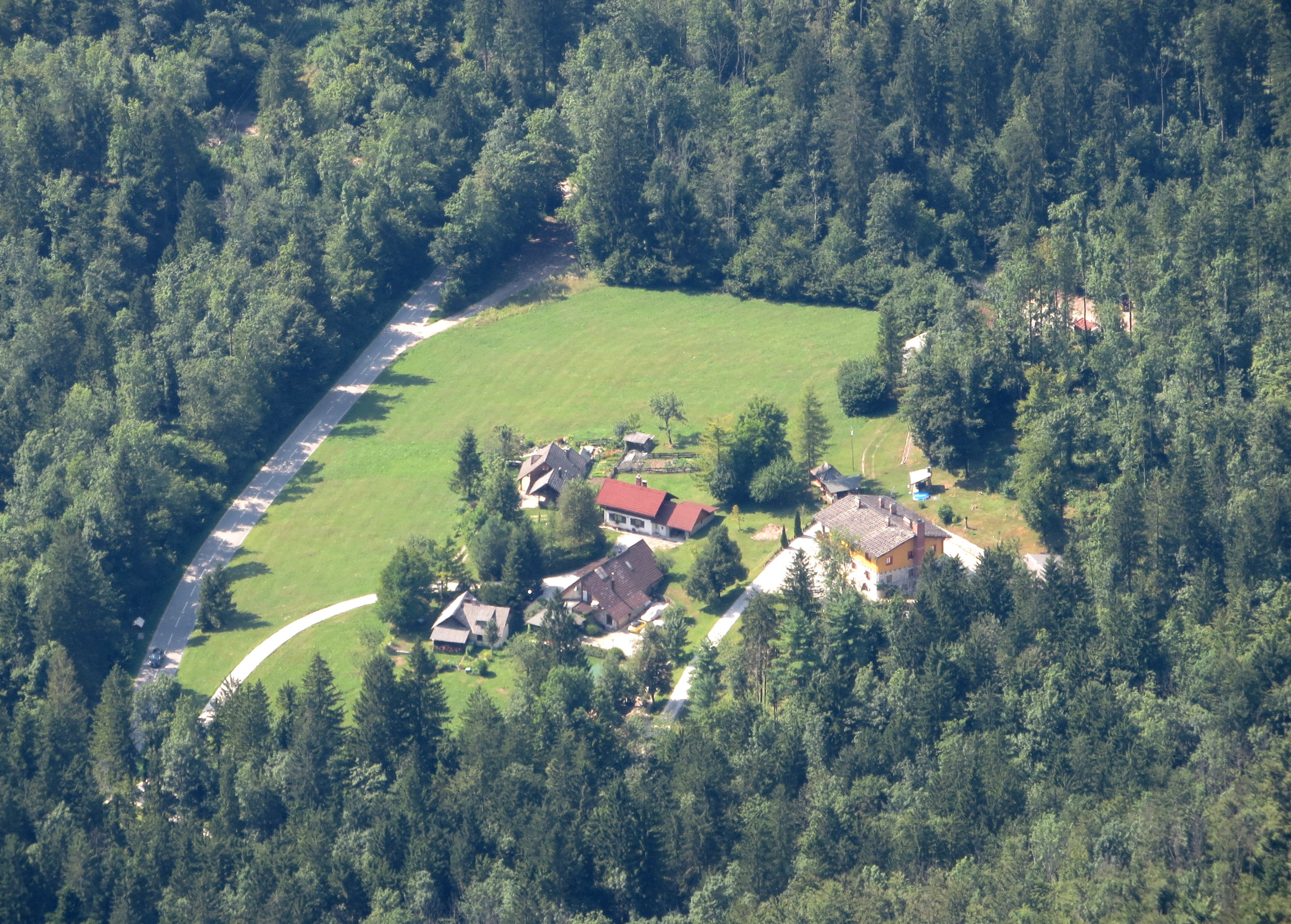

- Location in Slovenia
- Coordinates: 46°19′36.08″N 14°35′26.31″E
- Country: Slovenia
- Traditional region: Upper Carniola
- Statistical region: Central Slovenia
- Municipality: Kamnik
- Elevation: 595.8 m (1,955 ft)

Population (2002)
  - Total: 18

Kamniška Bistrica (pronounced [ˈkaːmniʃka ˈbiːstɾitsa]) is a small dispersed settlement close to the source of the Kamnik Bistrica River in the Municipality of Kamnik in the Upper Carniola region of Slovenia.

== Geography ==
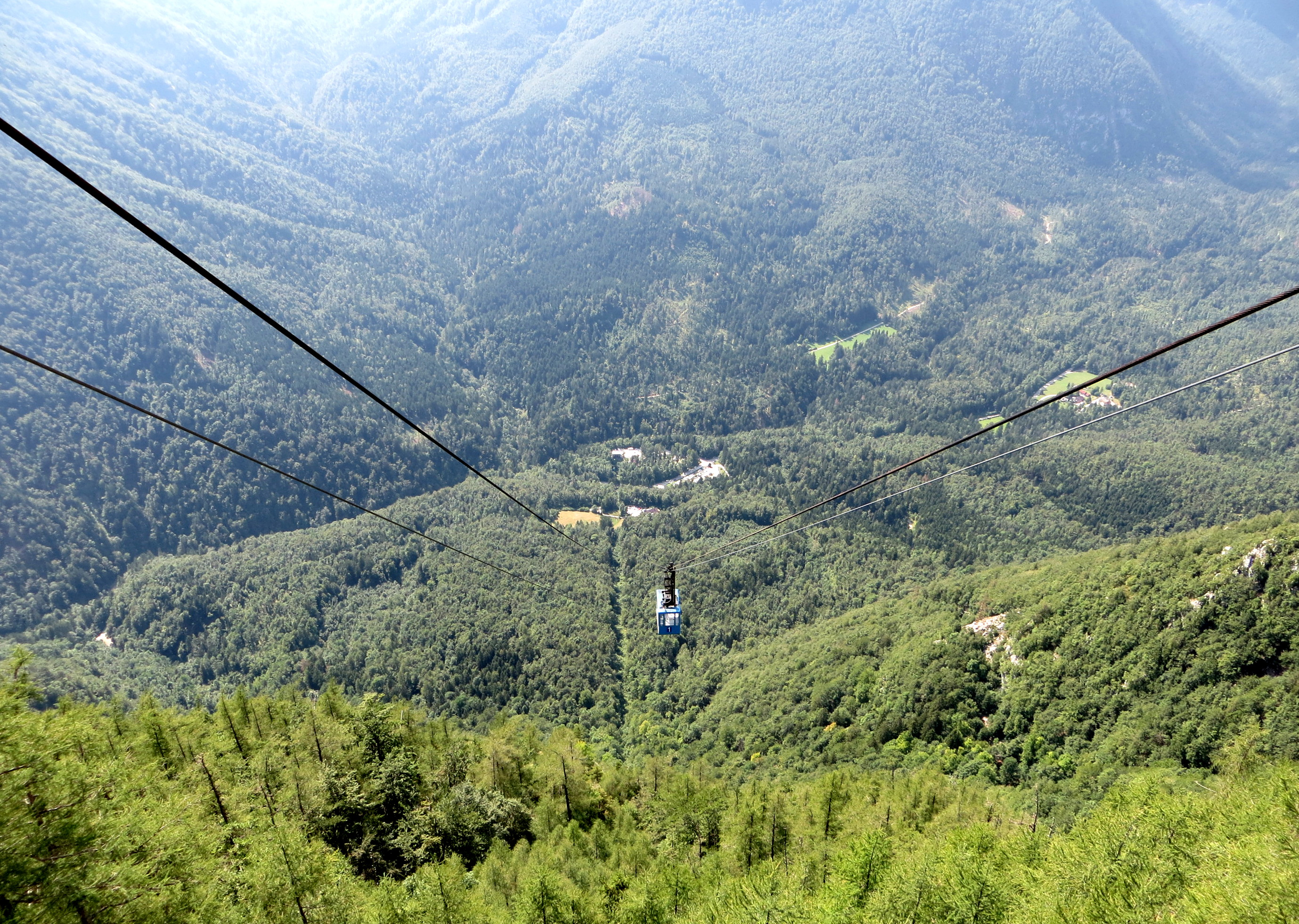
Cable car from Kraljev Hrib to Big Pasture Plateau

Kamniška Bistrica is a scattered settlement along the headwaters of the Kamnik Bistrica River north of Grohat Hill (912 meters or 2,992 feet) to the southwest and Flat Hill (Slovene: Ravni hrib; 1,204 meters or 3,950 feet) to the southeast. It is accessible by a road from Stahovica. In the hamlet of Kraljev Hrib there is a cable car to the Big Pasture Plateau.

== Name ==
The settlement takes its name from the Kamnik Bistrica River (Slovene: Kamniška Bistrica), the source of which lies in the central part of the settlement's territory. The epithet Kamniški differentiates the river from many other rivers named Bistrica. The name Bistrica refers to a swiftly flowing river and is derived from the Slavic adjective *bystrъ 'swiftly flowing, rushing'.

== History ==
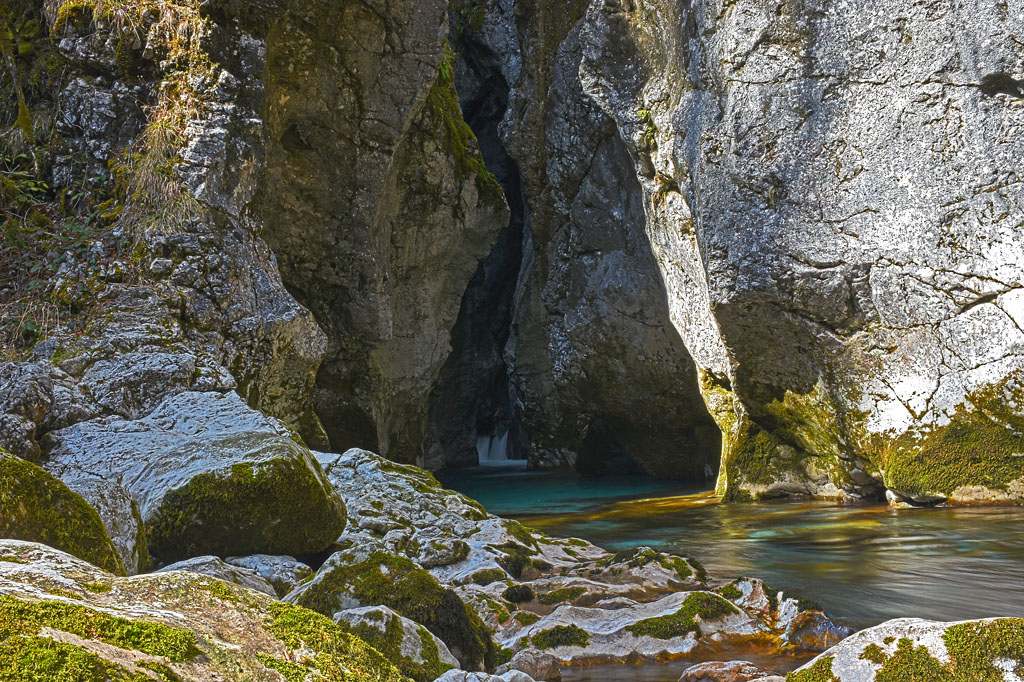
Big Predoselj Gorge

In the 16th century, the area was used for hunting by nobility and a table was set up in the Predoselj Gorge, where they would dine while on hunting expeditions. In 1826, draft evaders threw the table into the Kamnik Bistrica River, as a result of which the microtoponym Pri firštovi mizi ('At the Prince's Table') became established for the location. There was also a blast furnace in Kamniška Bistrica in the 16th century; it was recorded as owned by Jožef Žigan in 1739. In 1832, a queen mating station was established in the hamlet of Kopišča. The Bistrica Lodge at the head of the valley was built in 1902. The road into the valley was laid out in 1934. During the Second World War, the Partisans used the area as a refuge. They operated an underground print shop near Kopišča and set up a field hospital below Orličje Falls, which was active from the fall of 1943 to the fall of 1944. A bunker near the quarry at the south end of the valley was set up as a slaughterhouse and meat-processing facility.

=== Mass graves ===
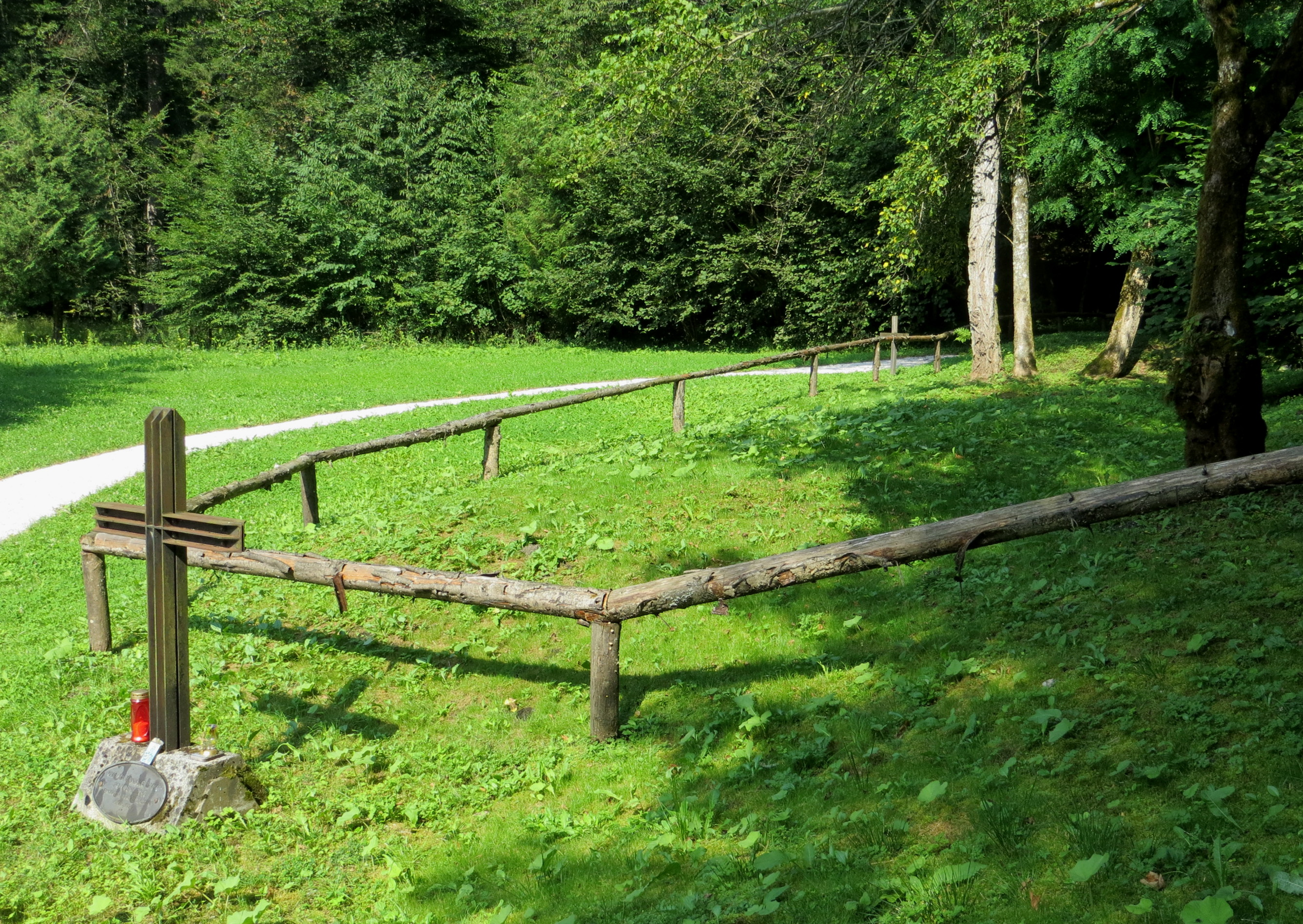
Kopišča 1 Mass Grave

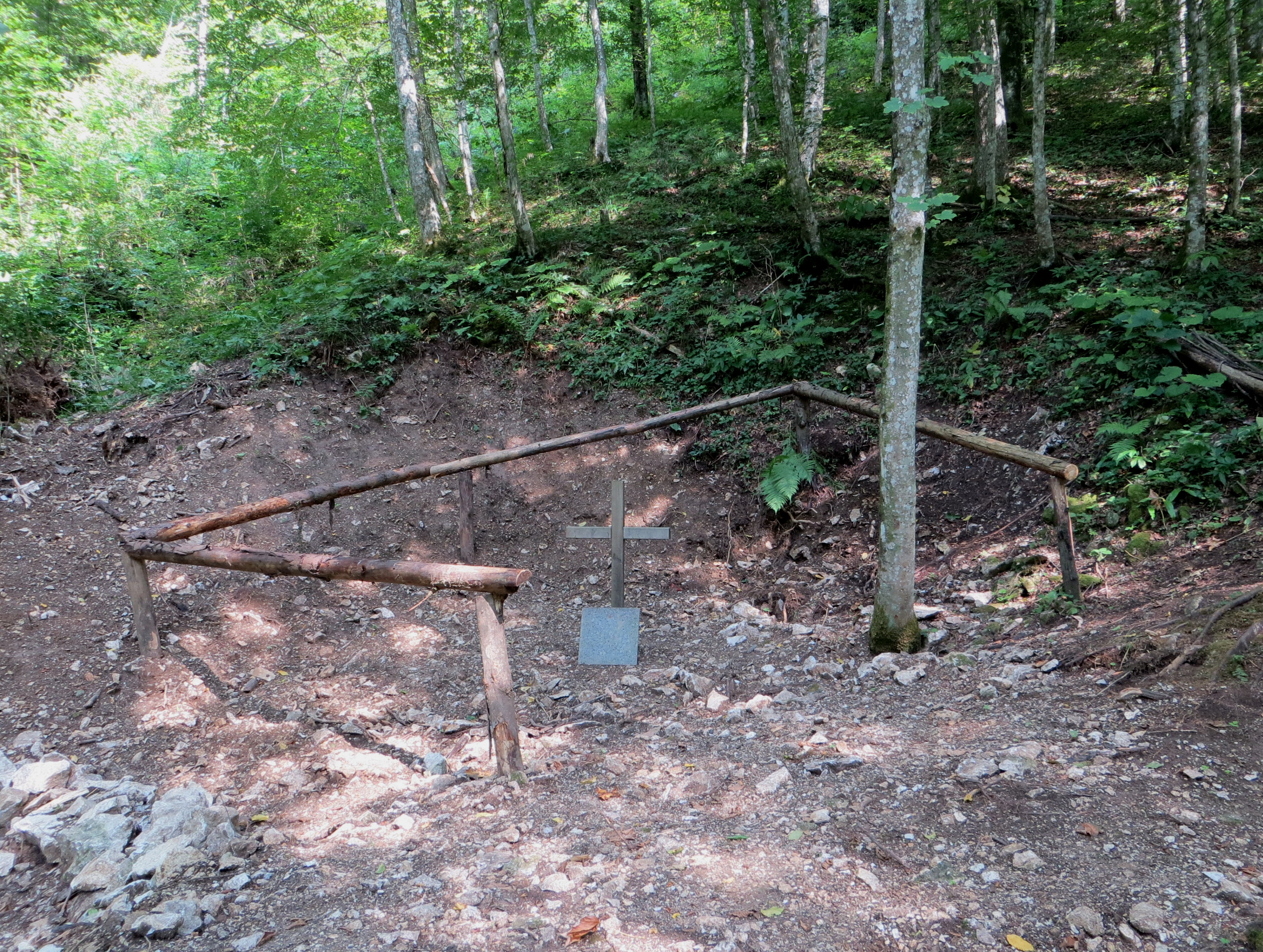
Macesnovec Mass Grave

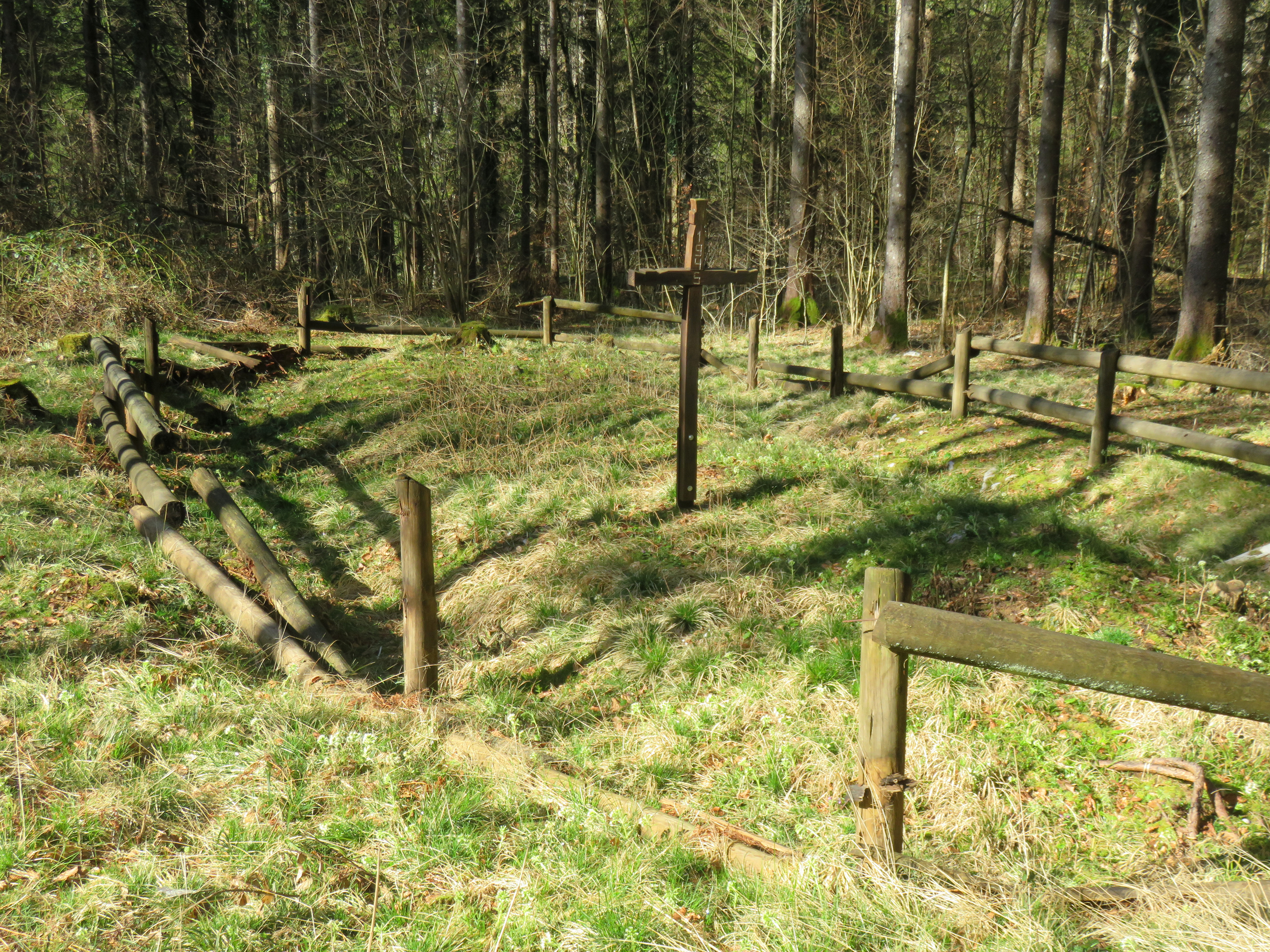
Dolski Plac Mass Grave

Kamniška Bistrica is the site of six known mass graves from the period immediately after the Second World War. All of the graves are located along the road from Stahovica to Kamniška Bistrica. Some of the graves probably contain the remains of a truckload of wounded Croatian soldiers that were transported to the area on 10 May 1945. The Macesnovec Mass Grave (Slovene: Grobišče Macesnovec) lies a few dozen meters east of a tourism sign. It was a clearly visible mound containing the remains of many prisoners of war, primarily Croatians but also Slovenes. The Šimen Slide Mass Grave (Grobišče Šimnov plaz) lies above the road and is a clearly visible mound along a path. It contains the remains of many Croatian refugees. The King's Hill Mass Grave (Grobišče Kraljev hrib) is located a few dozen meters from garages at the bottom of the cableway to the Big Pasture Plateau, in a clearing below the electric lines by the pole marked Č 23. It contains the remains of many Croatian refugees. The Kopišča 1 and 2 mass graves (Grobišče Kopišča 1, 2) are raised mounds. The first, larger mound (6 by 15.5 meters or 20 by 51 feet) lies immediately behind a memorial site. The smaller mound measures 6 by 8 meters (20 ft × 26 ft). They contain the remains of many prisoners of war, mostly Croatians and Serbs, and a large memorial has been set up. The Dolski Plac Mass Grave (Grobišče Dolski plac) is a large mound in the middle of a spruce plantation. It is marked by a deteriorating wooden cross. It contains the remains of a large number of mostly Croatian refugees.

== Cultural heritage ==
There is a mountain lodge and a small reservoir close to the source of the river. Another nearby building is the former Royal Hunting Lodge built for Alexander I of Yugoslavia and designed in 1932 by Jože Plečnik. The lodge was later used by Yugoslav president Josip Broz Tito and many of his guests. It is now referred to as the Plečnik Manor (Slovene: Plečnikov dvorec). There is also a smaller hunting lodge built on a boulder and also used by Tito. This lodge is called Beautiful Stone (Slovene: Lepi kamen).
