= Rožično =

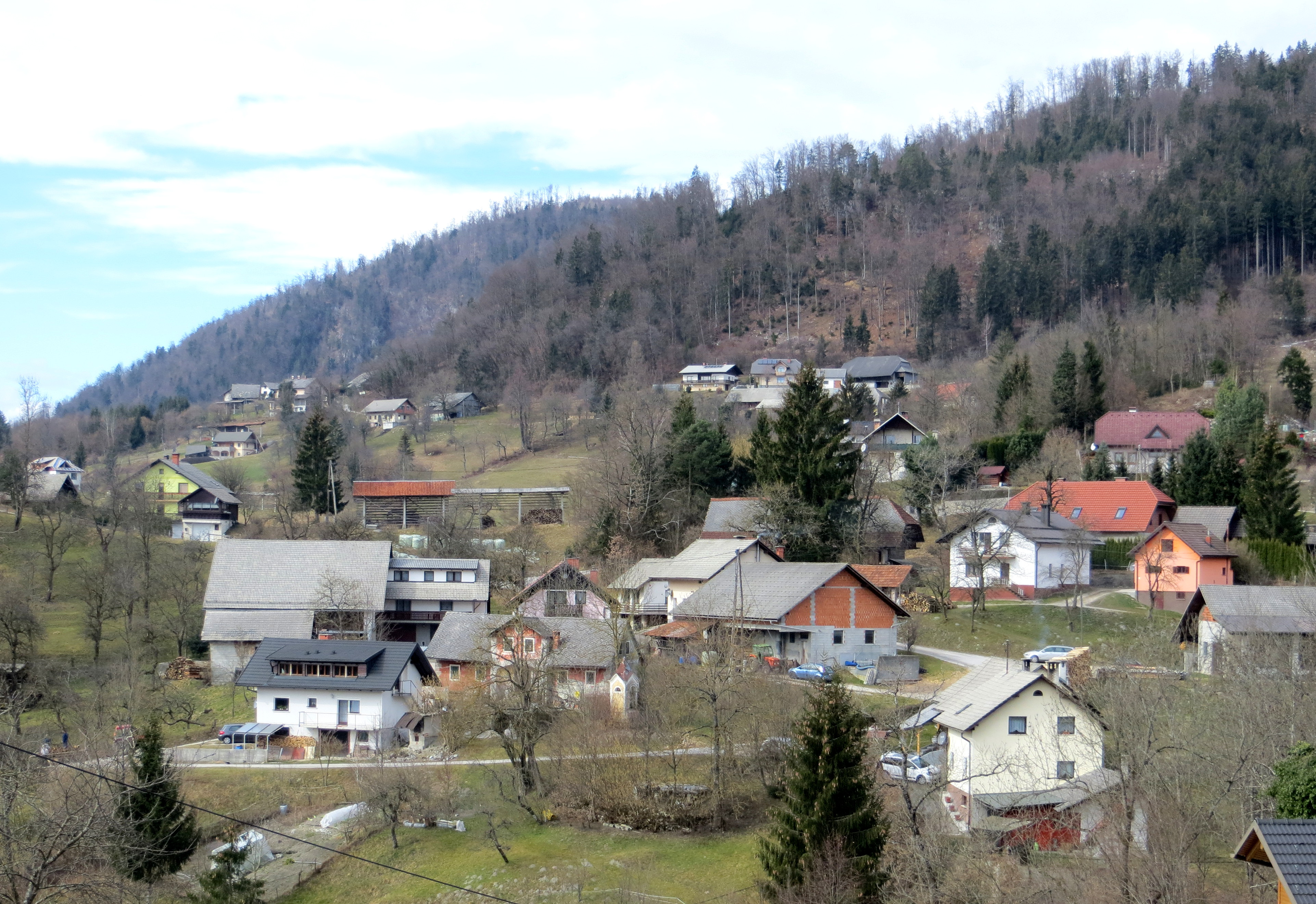

- Location in Slovenia
- Coordinates: 46°14′20.01″N 14°40′53.55″E
- Country: Slovenia
- Traditional region: Upper Carniola
- Statistical region: Central Slovenia
- Municipality: Kamnik

Area
  - Total: 0.65 km^{2} (0.25 sq mi)
- Elevation: 513.2 m (1,684 ft)

Population (2002)
  - Total: 104

Rožično (pronounced [ɾɔˈʒiːtʃnɔ]) is a small dispersed settlement in the Tuhinj Valley in the Municipality of Kamnik in the Upper Carniola region of Slovenia. It lies along the side valley of Rožičnica Creek, a tributary of the Nevljica River.
