= Marija Snežna =

Marija Snežna may refer to:

- One of the Industrial zones in Novi Sad
- The Slovenian name of The Chapel of Our Lady of the Snows on the Big Pasture Plateau
