= Velika Planina =

- Location in Slovenia
- Coordinates: 46°17′49″N 14°39′7″E
- Country: Slovenia
- Traditional region: Upper Carniola
- Statistical region: Central Slovenia
- Municipality: Kamnik

Area
  - Total: 5.61 km^{2} (2.17 sq mi)
- Elevation: 1,611.3 m (5,286 ft)

Population (2013)
  - Total: 3

Velika Planina (pronounced [ˈʋéːlika plaˈnìːna]; literally 'big pasture') is a dispersed high-elevation settlement of mostly herders' dwellings on the karst Big Pasture Plateau in the Kamnik Alps in Upper Carniola region of Slovenia.

== History ==
Velika Planina became an independent settlement in 1985, when it was administratively separated from neighboring Žaga.

== Architecture ==
The mainly wooden huts and barns in the settlement have a particular architecture. They are single-room dwellings with shingled oval roofs extending nearly to ground level, making the space created by the extended roof suitable for sheltering livestock. There are very few permanent residents in the settlement, but in the summer months it still has a sizable population of herdsmen who bring their flocks to the highland pastures. It is one of very few herders' settlements of this scale preserved in Europe and attracts visitors throughout the year with facilities for skiing in the winter and hiking in the summer. A number of houses to accommodate visitors have been built nearby. It is easily accessible by cable car from Kamniška Bistrica.

== Church ==
Prior to 1939, the architect Jože Plečnik prepared plans to build a church. The church design was modeled on the unique architecture of the surrounding huts. In 1939, the shepherds and dairymaids of Velika Planina used Plečnik's designs and built the Chapel of Our Lady of the Snows (Marija Snežna). Located just above the settlement, the small church was dedicated to the Virgin Mary. In the Second World War the chapel along with 100 other wooden dwellings were burnt down. The new chapel was built in 1988 and is particularly known for its Christmas Eve midnight mass.

== Gallery ==
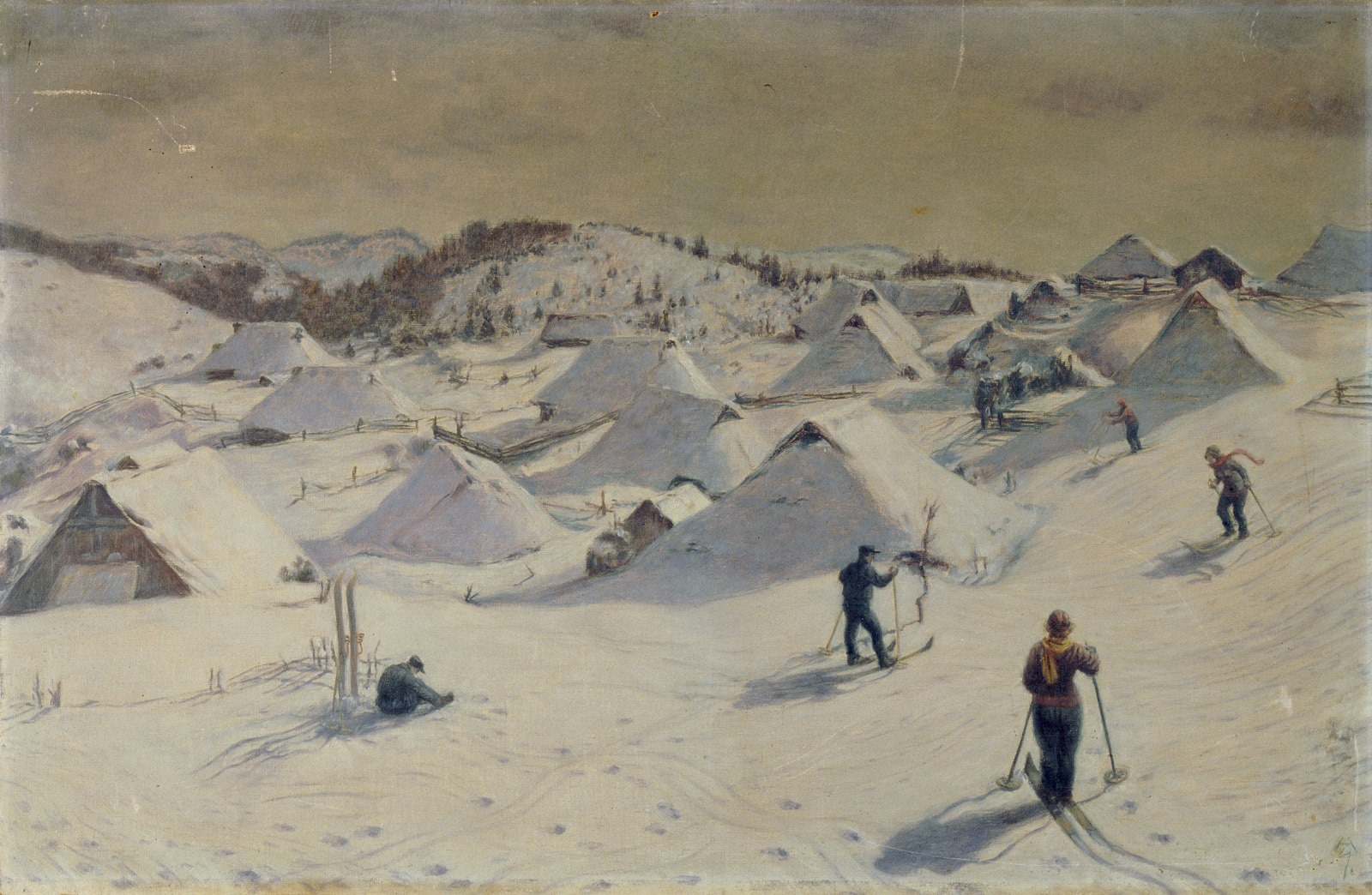
Velika Planina in the winter - oil on canvas

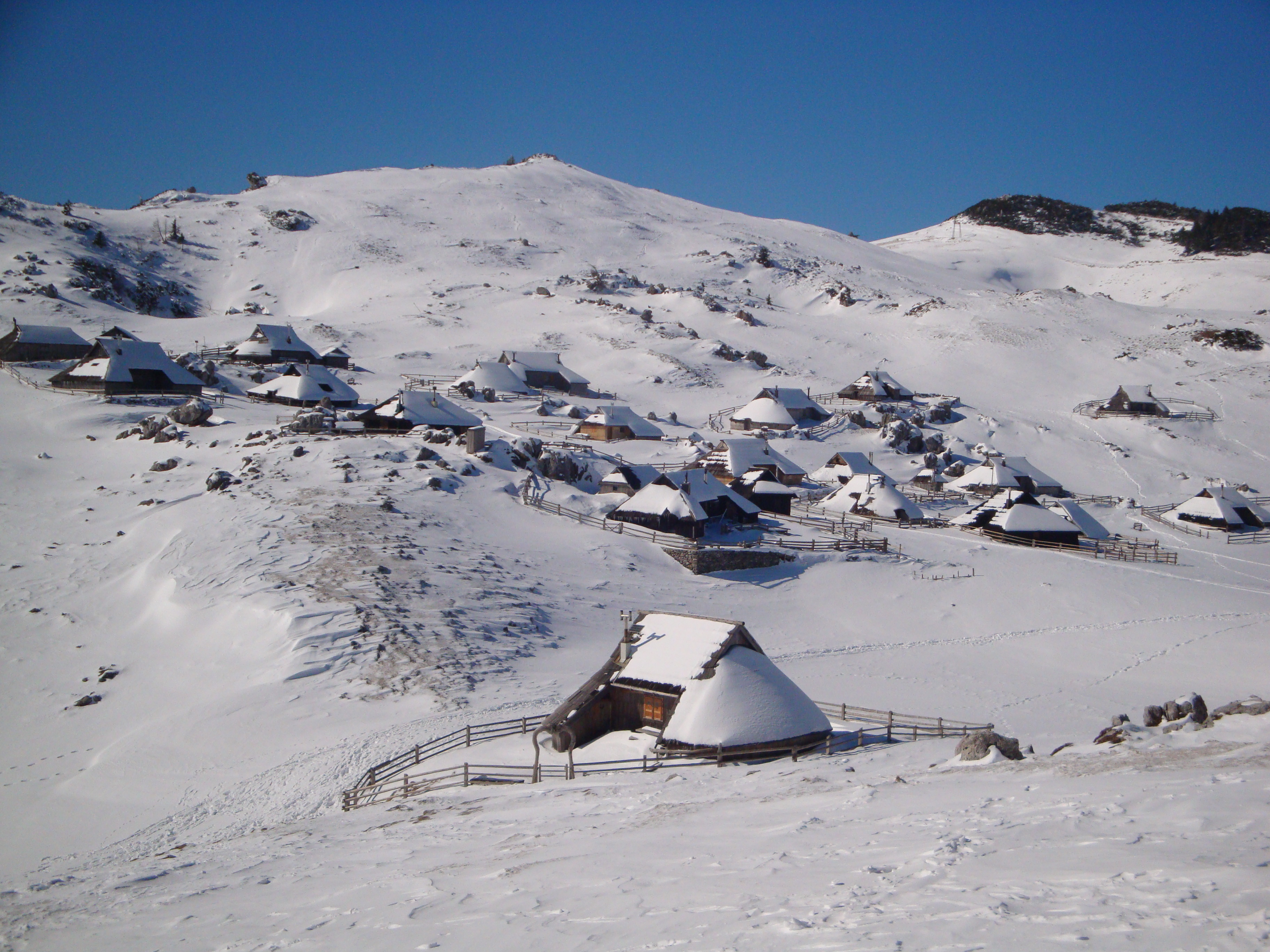
Photograph of Velika Planina in the winter

Curved roof construction is traditional for the huts on Velika Planina
