= Nevlje =

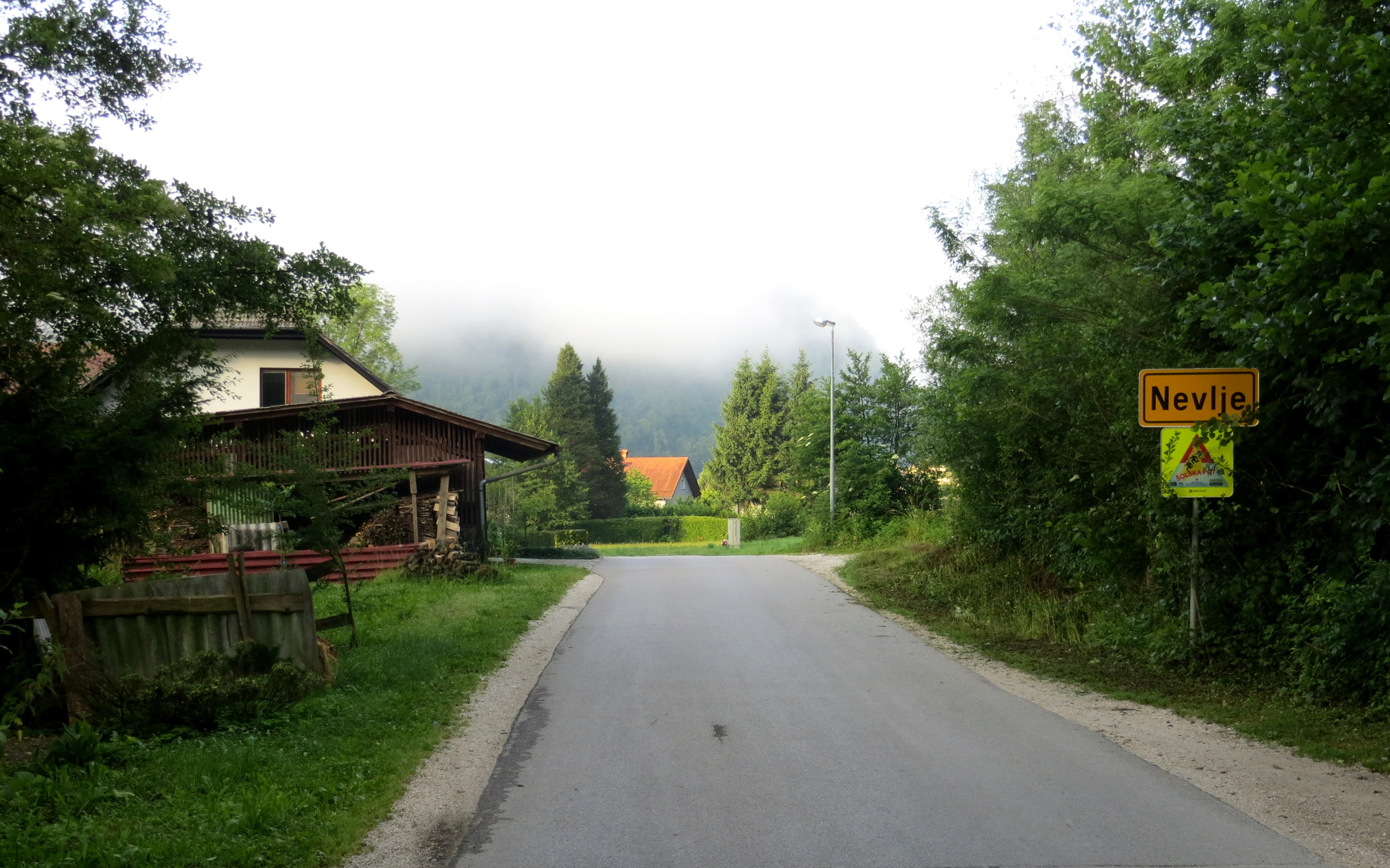

- Location in Slovenia
- Coordinates: 46°13′52.85″N 14°37′32.07″E
- Country: Slovenia
- Traditional region: Upper Carniola
- Statistical region: Central Slovenia
- Municipality: Kamnik

Area
  - Total: 0.38 km^{2} (0.15 sq mi)
- Elevation: 388.8 m (1,276 ft)

Population (2002)
  - Total: 225

Nevlje (pronounced [ˈneːu̯ljɛ]; German: Neul) is a settlement on the Nevljica River in the Municipality of Kamnik in the Upper Carniola region of Slovenia. It is located approximately 1 kilometre (0.62 mi) from Kamnik.

== Name ==
Nevlje was first attested in 1287 as villa de Nawel (and as Newel in 1288 and Newla in 1498). It is believed to be derived from the plural demonym *Nev(ь/ъ)ľane or *Neveľane. The origin of the name is unclear, but may be derived from the Slavic personal name *Neveľь, *Neveľa, or *Nevoľa. Some pseudoetymologies claim that the name is related the Slovene common noun navje 'cemetery'. In the past the German name was Neul.

== History ==
Nevlje is among the oldest settlements in the Kamnik area. A Negau helmet from the Hallstatt period (Early Bronze Age) was discovered in Nevlje in 1928. Kužna Hill is located above the village. Its name probably means the place where people with the plague were living. In 1563, an infectious disease hospital operated in Nevlje.

== Archaeological site ==
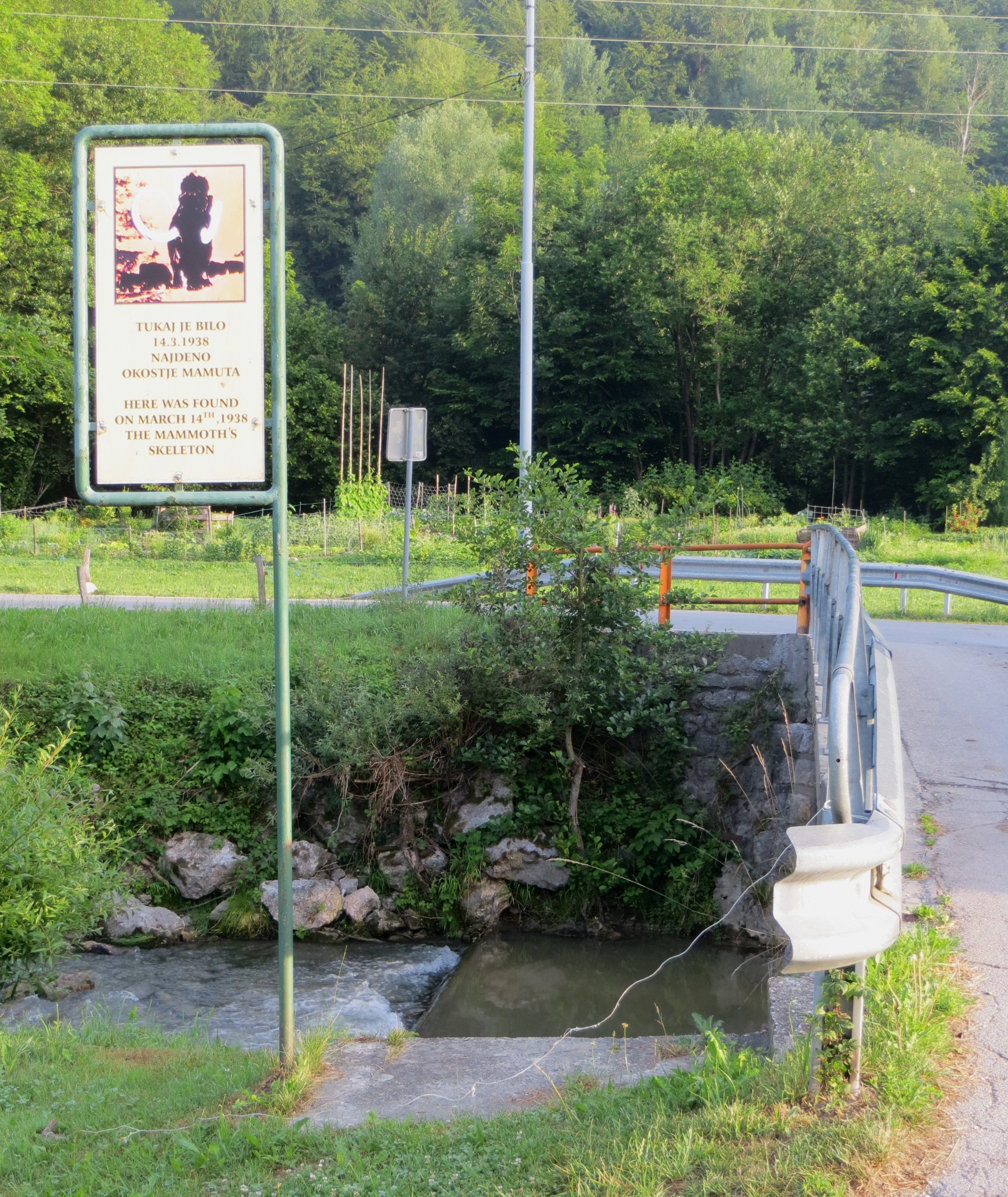
The mammoth skeleton was found along the Nevljica River.

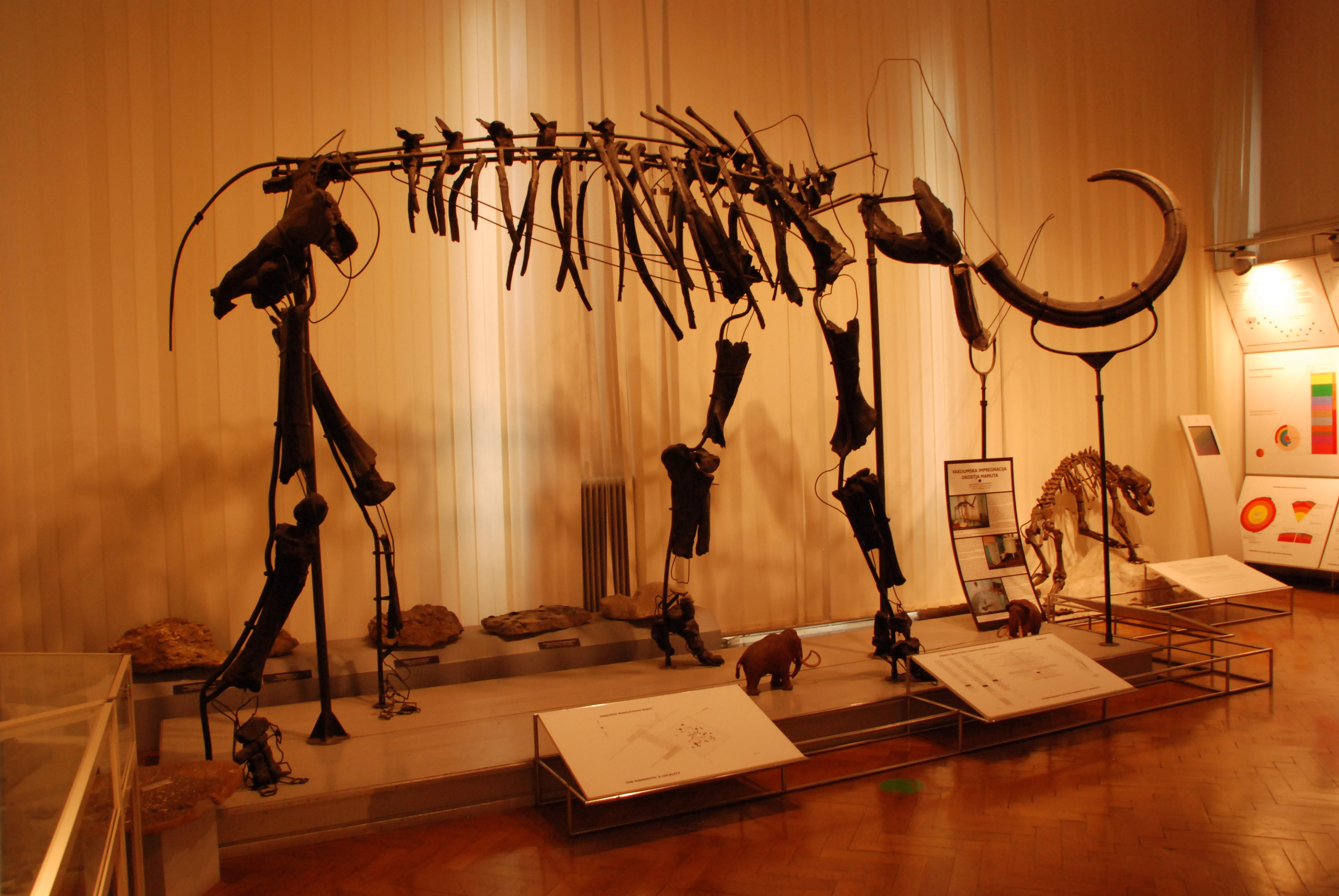
The wooly mammoth skeleton is now the symbol of the Natural History Museum of Slovenia.

In March and April 1938, an almost complete skeleton of a 40-year-old woolly mammoth (Mammuthus primigenius), an antler of a reindeer (Rangifer tarandus), an atlas of a polar fox (Alopex lagopus), and a small Paleolithic tool made of almost black flint were found in Nevlje by workers who built a bridge across the Nevljica and deepened its bed. It was the first discovered Paleolithic hunting settlement in the territory of the present Slovenia and was dated to around 20,000 BP, the time of the Gravettian culture in the latter half of the Würm period (the last glaciation period). The excavations attracted domestic and international public attention, researchers, and politicians. A bridge built at this spot was named the Mammoth Bridge (Slovene: Mamutov most). A pollen analysis was performed at the site for the first time by Ana Tregubov-Budnar, the first Slovenian palinologist. In 1944, she attributed the pollen to the end of an interglacial period. Later, it was shown by Alojz Šercelj that it actually belongs to the Würm glaciation. The mammoth skeleton is one of the best preserved in Europe and has become the symbol of the Natural History Museum of Slovenia, where it is now on display.

== Church ==
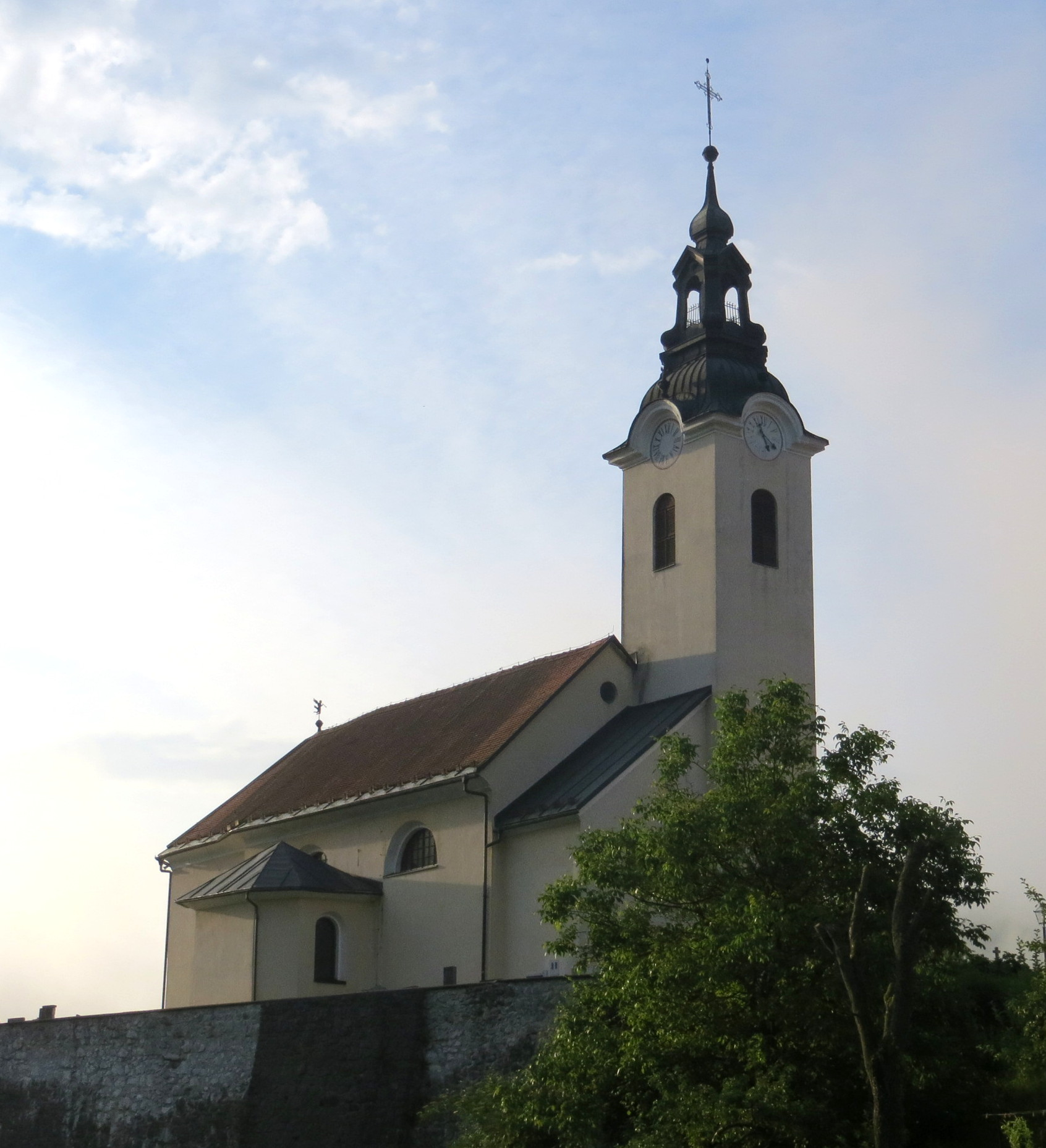
Saint George's Church

Saint George's Parish Church is located in Nevlje and is the oldest in the region. Until 1232, it was the seat of the Parish of Kamnik. In the middle of the 20th century, the architecture of the church was enriched by Jože Plečnik, who designed its baptistry.

== See also ==
- Potok Cave
