= Slovene Ethnographic Museum =

Museum in Ljubljana, Slovenia

- Slovenski etnografski muzej
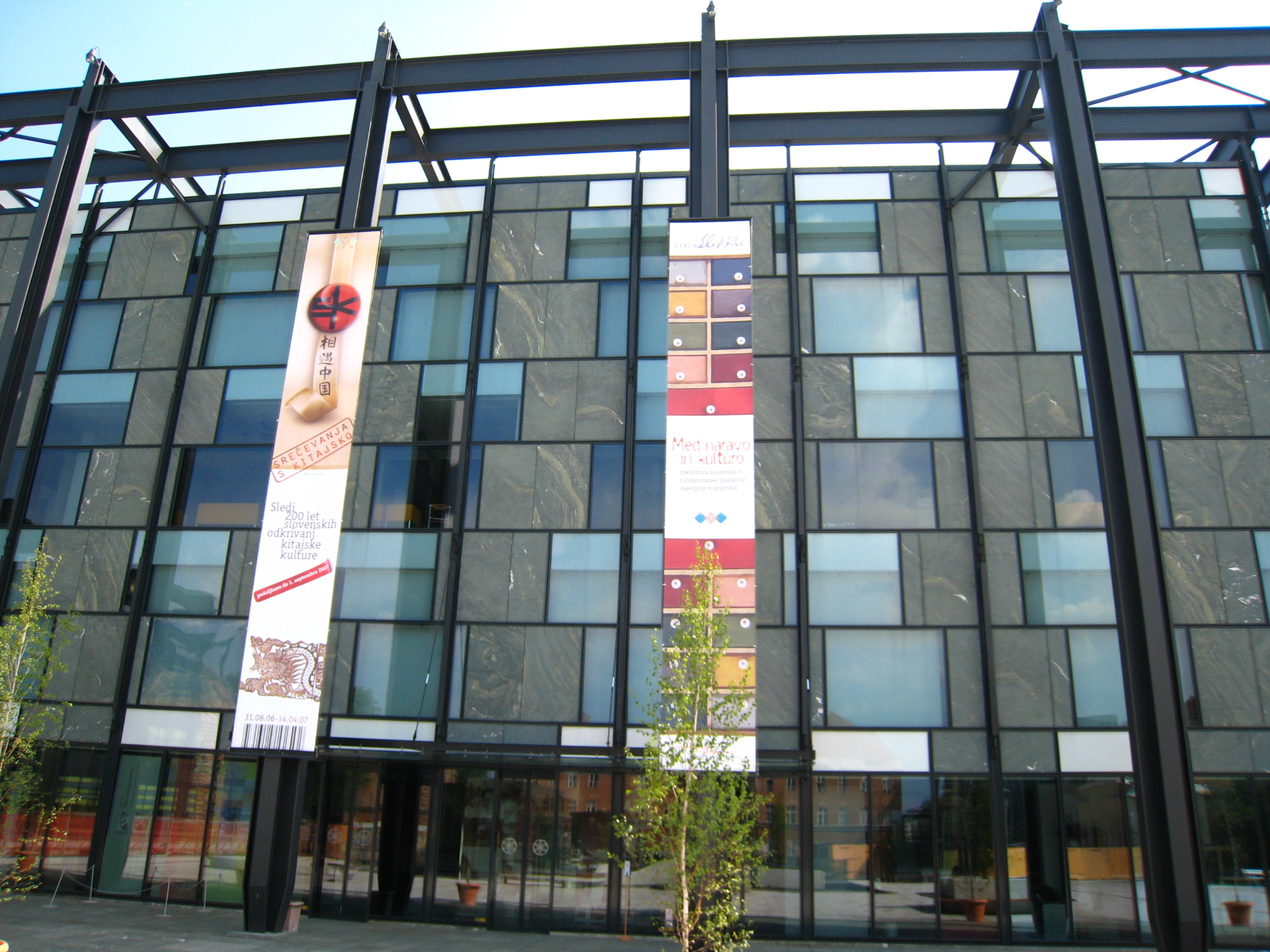
- Exterior of the museum
- Established: 1923; 103 years ago
- Location: Ljubljana, Slovenia
- Coordinates: 46°3′18″N 14°30′58″E
- Type: Ethnological museum
- Director: Blaž Verbič
- Public transit access: Ljubljana railway station City buses 2, 9, 12, 25, 27 B, 27 NS (Friškovec stop)
- Website: www.etno-muzej.si

The Slovene Ethnographic Museum (Slovenski etnografski muzej) is a museum and ethnographic institution in Ljubljana, Slovenia. Its primary focus is the documentation and presentation of Slovene culture and heritage. However, it also features exhibitions focusing on non-European cultures, with approximately a quarter of its material collection comprising items from these regions.

The museum also contains a library and a documentation department open to visitors. Additionally, it has facilities to host events such as lectures and conferences.

== History ==
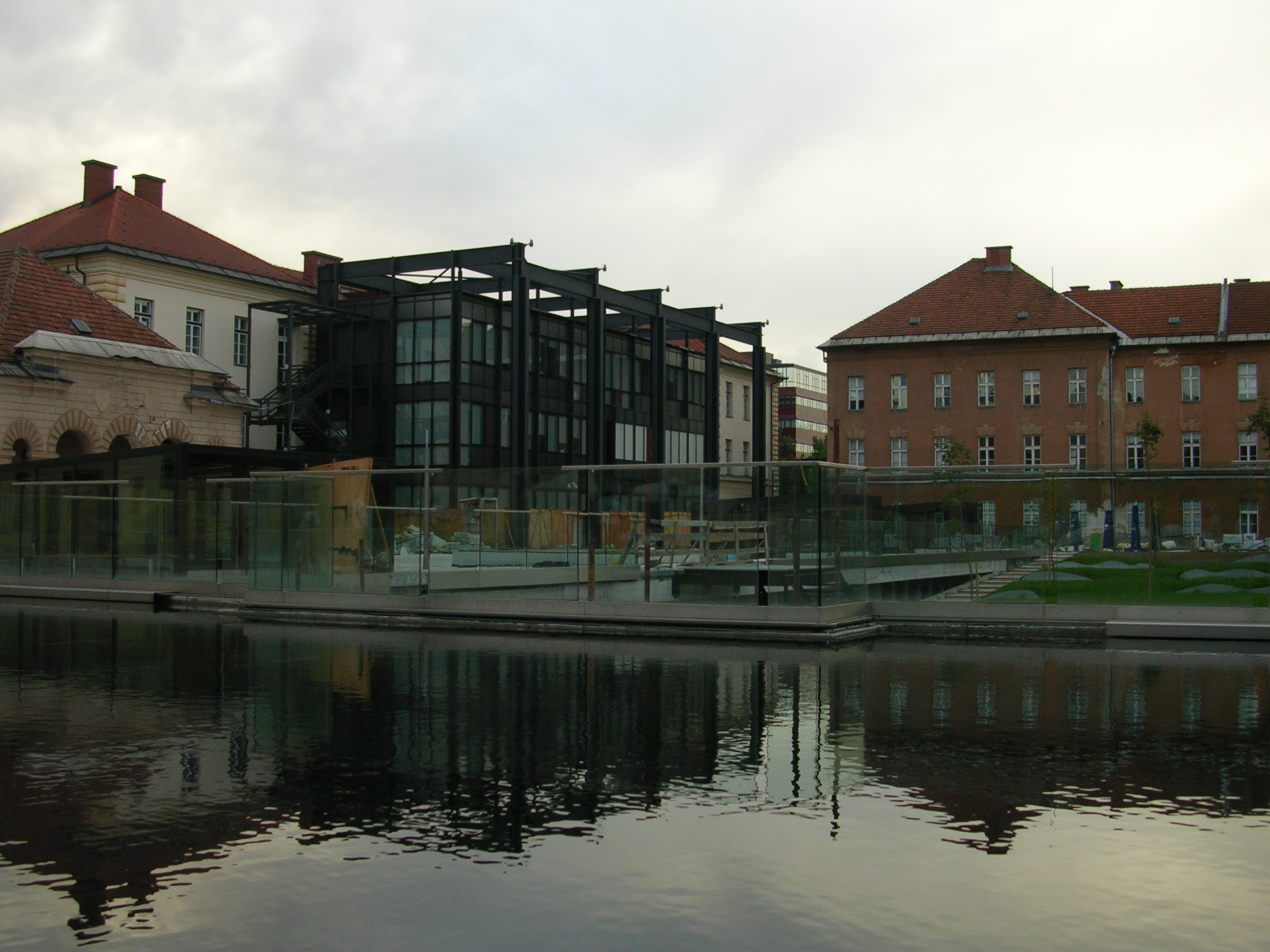
The Metelkova cultural centre, of which the museum is a part.

The origins of the museum can be traced to the ethnographic collections of the Provincial Museum of Carniola (now the National Museum of Slovenia), established in 1821. However, the museum recognises its founding date to be in 1923, when it became independent of the National Museum to be established as the Royal Ethnographic Museum, formerly the Institute of Ethnography within its parent institution. Slovene ethnologist Niko Županič was appointed as the first director of the museum. In 1941, it was renamed as the Ethnographic Museum, and in 1964 as the Slovene Ethnographic Museum. Collections were displayed at several castles surrounding Ljubljana.

Located in the Rudolfinum building with the National Museum until 1997, it then moved into its present address, in a former Austro-Hungarian barracks from the late-19th century, which was constructed for the Habsburg army infantry. Due to limited floor space, the Goričane Castle had housed the non-European collections until 2001. Construction of a new exhibition building was completed in 2004 and the museum was expanded.

== Collections ==
The museum holds roughly 40,000 items, with 30,000 in Slovene collections and 10,000 in non-European collections. 29,000 of these items are inventoried in the museum's documentation system. The Documentation Department of the museum also retains a digitised collection of pictorial material, approximately 110,000 in number.

The Slovene collections are categorised and maintained by curators across seven departments, some of which are the Clothing Culture and Textiles Collection, the Rural Economy and Transport Collection, and the Spiritual Culture Collection. These collections help in understanding the everyday life of Slovenians, and in understanding the similarities and differences between it and neighbouring cultures. The Slovenian collections were inherited from the museum's predecessors, and had initially been created in the late nineteenth century.

The non-European collections of the museum are categorised by continent and donor. Several items in the collection were donated by seamen and Catholic missionaries, who would travel outside the region; other noted professions that donated items included explorers, merchants, and diplomats. Examples of such persons include Ignatius Knoblecher and Baron Anton Codelli.

== Exhibitions ==
The museum hosts a few permanent exhibitions, and temporary exhibitions throughout the year. The temporary exhibitions are usually displayed for a period between two and six months. The first permanent exhibition, titled Between Nature and Culture, was opened in 2006, and exhibits over 3000 objects relating to everyday and festive Slovenian life. The remaining permanent exhibitions were set up between 2022 and 2025. Temporary exhibitions have focused on subjects such as the colonial history of Tanzania and Ukrainian embroidered clothing.

The museum also hosts "virtual tours" on its website, which allow the viewer to see the exhibits as though they were in the museum. This is achieved through a series of 360-degree panoramas, which may optionally be viewed with VR headsets for a more immersive experience.

== Programs ==
The museum offers guided tours with prior booking.

The museum includes a pottery studio that offers activities involving the production of clay-based and ceramic articles. The studio offers several courses and workshops, as well as individual classes. The museum also has a weaving atelier, from which visitors may purchase products such as scarves and jackets. The atelier also hosts individual weaving courses. For children, the museum hosts educational events such as video projections and lectures.

== Access and accessibility ==
The information in this section is accurate as of November 2026.

The museum is less than ten minutes by walk from the main Ljubljana bus and train station. City buses 2, 9, 12, 25, 27 B, and 27 NS can also be used; stopping at Friškovec on Masarykova street leaves a less-than-five-minute walk to the museum. The museum is open from 10 am to 6 pm from Tuesday to Sunday; on Thursdays, the hours are extended to 8 pm. It remains closed on Mondays and national holidays. The library and documentation sections have opening hours specified on Mondays as well, but not on Saturdays and Sundays.

Entry costs 8 euros for adults and 5 euros for children, with discounted rates for pensioners and families. Group tours can also be arranged (with a tour guide) if notice is given in advance; depending on the size of the group, rates vary, but are slightly higher per person than the previously listed individual rates. Additional charges may apply to participate in workshops or other programs hosted by the museum from time to time. Admission is free for tour guides, the unemployed, people with disabilities, museum donors, and holders of valid membership cards. It is also free on the first Sunday of every month.

The museum has facilities for the specially abled, such as magnifiers, audio guides, and tactile maps for the visually impaired, and toilets for people with disabilities, and all exhibitions are accessible to wheelchair users.
