= Big Pasture Plateau =

Mountain plateau in the Kamnik-Savinja Alps, Slovenia

Coordinates: 46°17′43.82″N 14°39′12.67″E

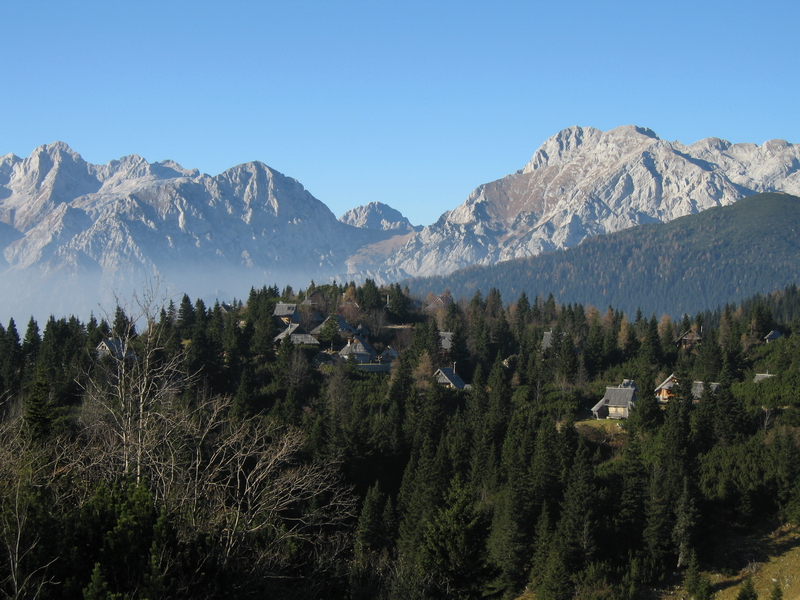
Big Pasture Plateau

The Big Pasture Plateau (Slovene: Velika planina) is a karstified mountain plateau in the Kamnik–Savinja Alps northeast of Kamnik, Slovenia. It measures 5.8 square kilometres (2.2 square miles) and has an average elevation of 1,500 metres (4,900 feet) above sea level. Its highest point is Mount Gradišče, at 1,666 m (5,466 ft). There are numerous herders' dwellings that comprise several settlement areas: Velika Planina 'Big Pasture', Mala Planina 'Little Pasture', Gojška Planina 'Gozd Pasture' (named for the village of Gozd), Tiha Dolina 'Quiet Valley', and others. The Big Pasture Plateau is a tourist destination both in winter as a ski resort and in summer as a place for relaxation.

== History ==
There is evidence that man has been present on the Big Pasture Plateau since prehistoric times. In Medieval times the plateau was used for pasturing. The oldest huts, which date from the 16th century, are nearly identical to the present Preskar Hut (Slovene: Preskarjeva bajta). The hut is oval, covered from roof to ground with shingles, without windows, doors, or a chimney.

In the winter of 1931–1932 a new form of tourism began, known as bajtarstvo, which involved renting the huts in the winter when there was no pasturing. During the Second World War, German forces and the Slovene Home Guard burned all of the huts to the ground. The chapel dedicated to Our Lady of the Snows, built in 1938 by the Slovenian architect Jože Plečnik, was also burned, but it was rebuilt in 1988.

== Starting points ==
- With cable car from the Kamnik Bistrica Valley
- From the Volovljek Pass (by car)
- 3h: from Stahovica via Saint Primus' Church above Kamnik
- 5h: from the Kamnik Bistrica Valley and Kopišč via Dol
- 4h: from the Kocbek Lodge at Korošica
- 4½h: from Luče via the Volovljek Pass

== Ski resort ==
There is a small ski resort with a cable car, one two-seat chairlift, and six surface lifts. The length of tracks is 6 km. For environmental reasons, artificial snow cannot be produced.

== Mountain lodges ==
- Črnuče Lodge at Little Pasture (Črnuški dom na Mali planini, 1526 m)
- Domžale Lodge at Little Pasture (Domžalski dom na Mali planini, 1534 m)
- Jarše Lodge at Little Pasture (Jarški dom na Mali Planini, 1520 m)

== Gallery ==
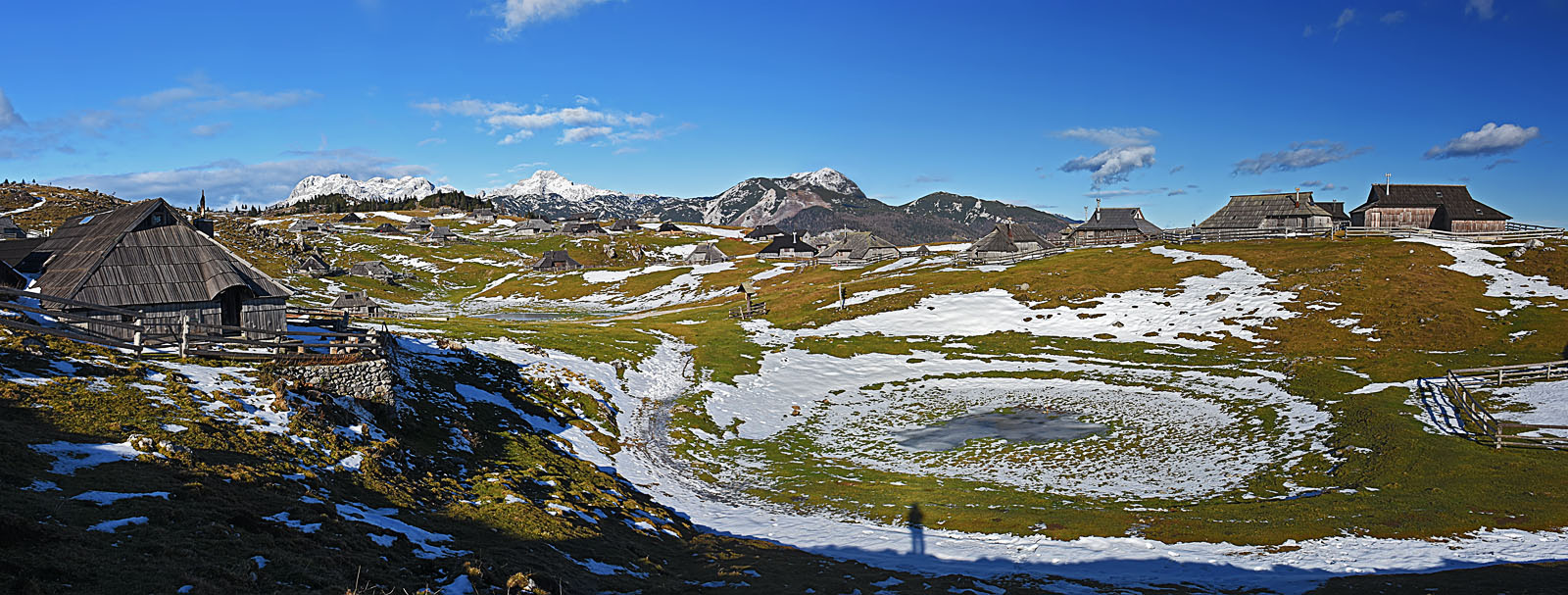
Largest settlement on the Big Pasture Plateau

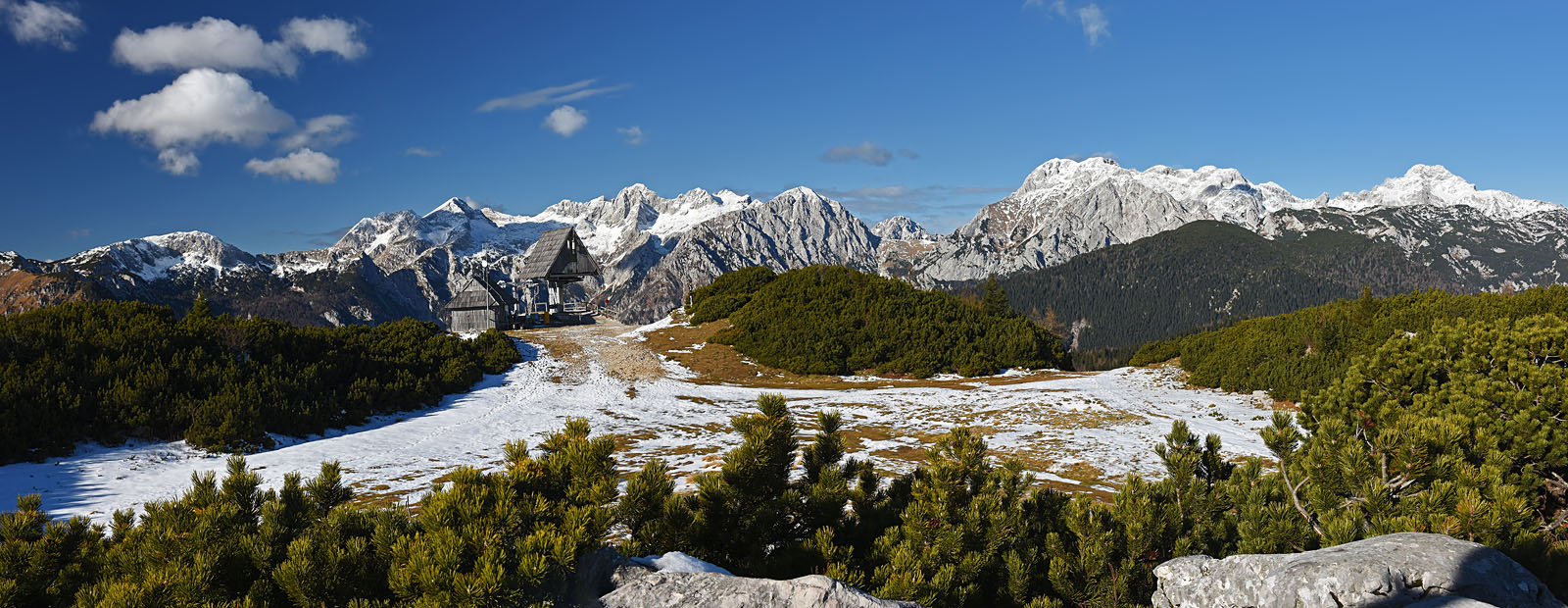
Highest point of the Big Pasture Plateau

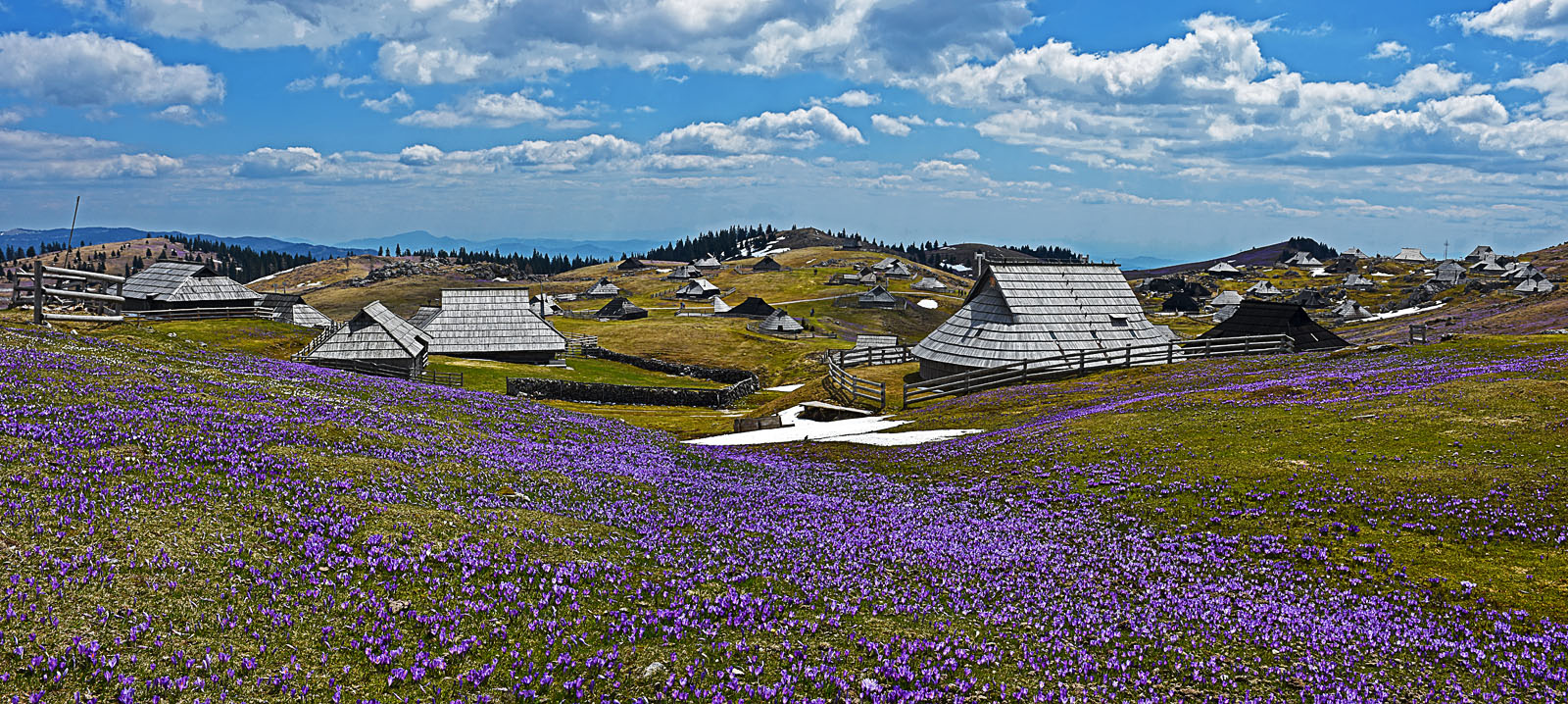
The Big Pasture Plateau in April
