= Slovenian Museum of Natural History =

Natural museum in Ljubljana, Slovenia

Coordinates: 46°3′8″N 14°29′58″E

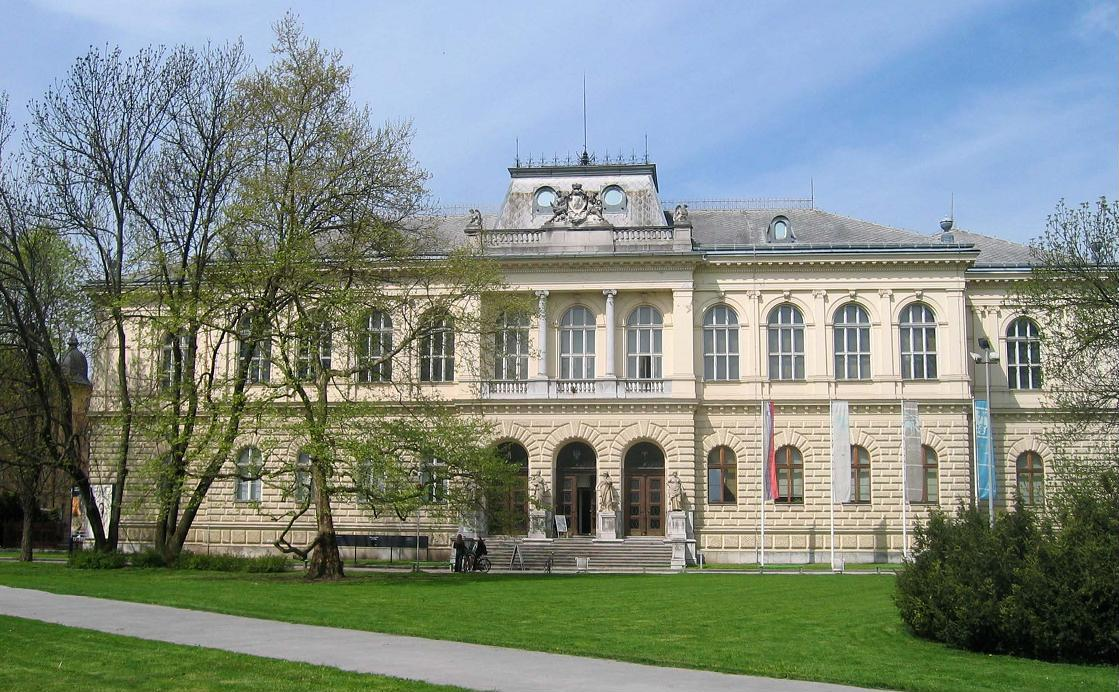
The museum building in Ljubljana that hosts the Natural History Museum of Slovenia and the National Museum of Slovenia

The Slovenian Museum of Natural History (Slovene: Prirodoslovni muzej Slovenije, Latin: Museum Historiae Naturalis Sloveniae) is a Slovenian national museum with natural history, scientific, and educational content. It is the oldest cultural and scientific Slovenian institution.

The museum features national, European, and worldwide collections demonstrating the changes in biodiversity, the development of the natural history thought, as well as different techniques of collection and preparation of samples. Its research activities focus on natural heritage of Slovenia.

The Slovenian Museum of Natural History operates in the Center District in Ljubljana, the capital of Slovenia, at Museum Street (Muzejska ulica), near Tivoli Park, the Parliament and the Opera House. Along with the National Museum of Slovenia, it is housed in a building from 1885, built upon the plans by the Viennese architect Wilhelm Rezori and the master builder Wilhelm Treo from Ljubljana.

The symbol of the museum is an almost complete woolly mammoth skeleton, found in Nevlje near Kamnik in 1938. Its official publication, published since autumn 1978, has been named Scopolia in honour of Giovanni Antonio Scopoli, a leading Carniolan naturalist of the 18th century.

== History ==
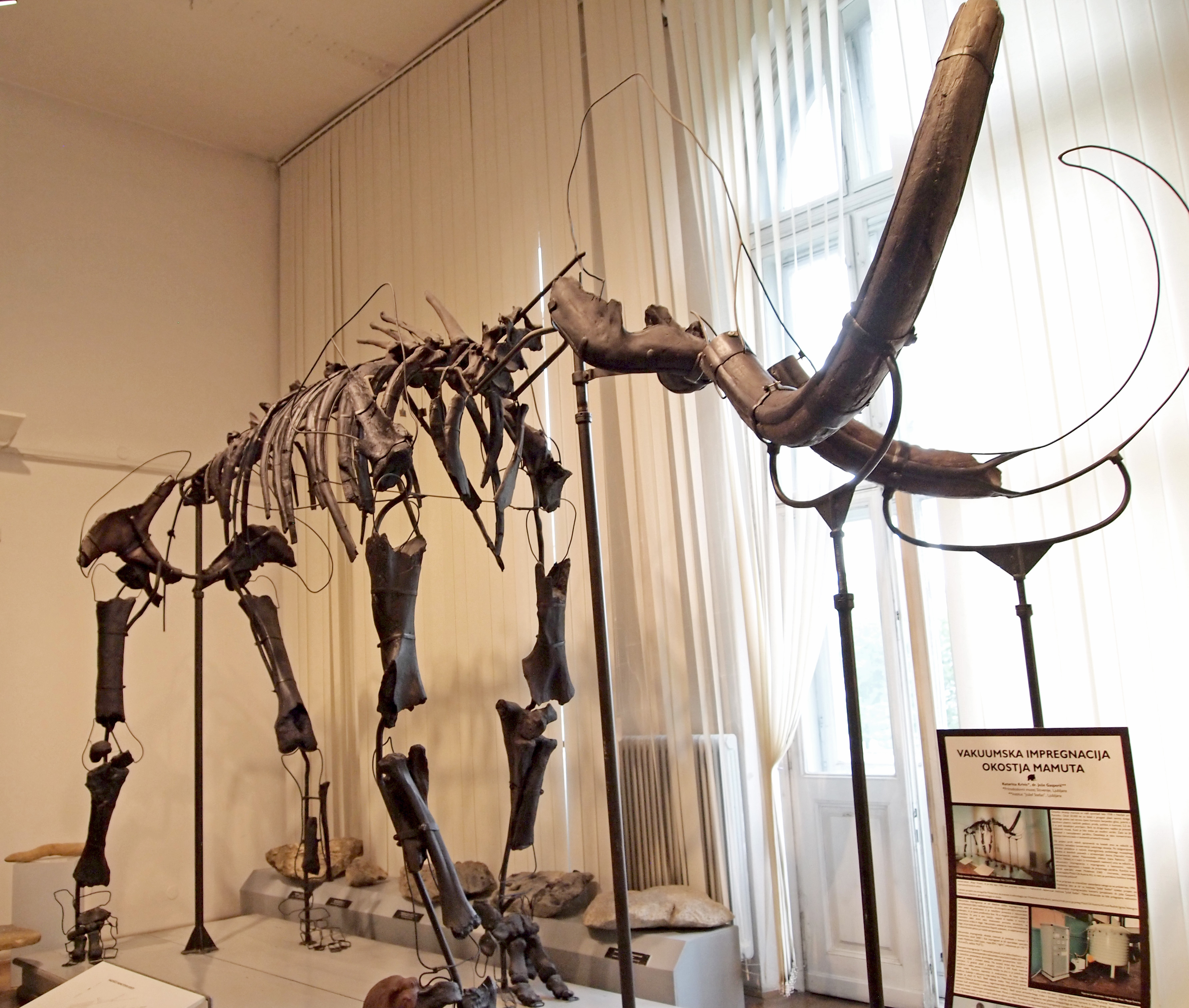
The wooly mammoth skeleton that was found in 1938 in Nevlje is one of the best preserved in Europe and the symbol of the Natural History Museum of Slovenia.

The museum was founded in 1821 as the Carniolan Estates Museum (German: Krainisch Ständisches Museum). Five years later, Austrian Emperor Francis II decided to personally sponsor the museum and ordered it renamed the Carniolan Provincial Museum. In 1882, the museum was renamed the Carniolan Provincial Museum—Rudolphinum after Crown Prince Rudolph.

After the establishment of the Kingdom of Serbs, Croats and Slovenes, the name was changed to the National Museum. In 1944, it was divided into the National Museum of Slovenia and the Slovenian Museum of Natural History (then known as the Museum of Natural Sciences).

In 2005, the museum acquired its largest object, a skeleton of a young female fin whale named Leonora, which was found dead on the Slovenian coast in 2003. The animal weighed 11 tonnes (11 long tons; 12 short tons) and was 13.2 metres (43 ft) long. After an elaborate procedure, the skeleton was put on display in autumn 2011.

== Collections ==
The museum's geological-palaeontological collections include fossils from various Slovenian sites. In addition to the mammoth from Nevlje, also of significance are a 210-million-year-old 84-centimetre (33 in) long fish skeleton found in the Triglav Mountains and a Miocene-era baleen whale skeleton found in the Slovene Hills.

One of the museum's founding collections was Sigmund Zois's mineral collection. Although it is an outstanding historical collection, minerals are now exhibited as classified by modern methods according to their internal structure, and among them is the mineral zoisite, named after Zois. There are also two Biedermeier wooden tables that are covered by tiles from Palnstorf's collection of minerals and rocks.

Hohenwart's collection of mollusc shells comprises about 5,000 specimens, dating from 1831 and originating mainly from the Indo-Pacific. The insect collection of Ferdinand J. Schmidt includes several interesting specimens, notably the "narrow-necked" blind cave beetles (Leptodirus hochenwartii) that were described in 1831 as the first cave insect. The plants and animals of the mountains, marshes, and woods are shown in specialised dioramas. Also on view are permanent bird, reptile, fish, mammal and skeleton collections.

The Slovenian Wildlife Sound Archive is a collection of animal sounds, mainly on Heteroptera and cicadas, stored on digital and analogue recording media.
