= National Museum of Slovenia =

Slovenian museum

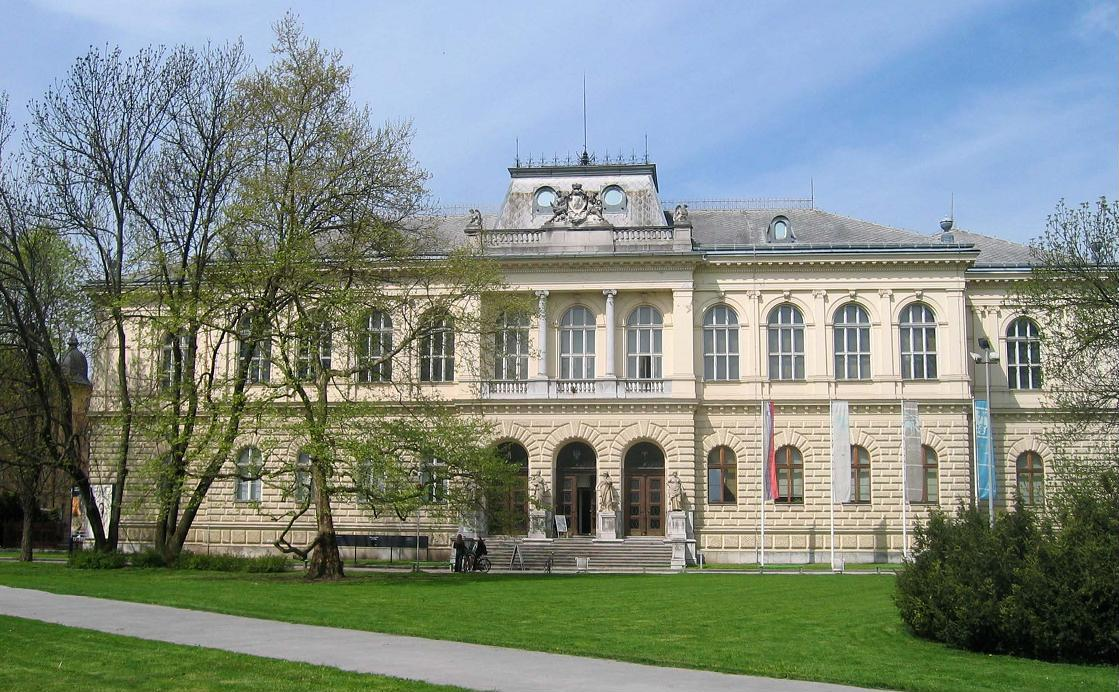
- The building in Ljubljana where the National Museum of Slovenia and the Slovenian Museum of Natural History are located
- Interactive fullscreen map
- Location: Ljubljana, Slovenia
- Coordinates: 46°03′08″N 14°29′58″E

The National Museum of Slovenia (Slovene: Narodni muzej Slovenije) is located in Ljubljana, the capital of Slovenia. It is located in the Center district of the city near Tivoli City Park. Along with the Slovenian Museum of Natural History, located in the same building, the National Museum of Slovenia is the country's oldest scientific and cultural institution. The museum has an extensive collection of archaeological artefacts, old coins and banknotes (in the numismatics department on the ground floor) and displays related to the applied arts. In 2021, it is been given the golden Order for Exceptional Merits by the president of Slovenia, Borut Pahor.

== History ==
The museum was founded in 1821 as the "Estate Museum of Carniola" (German: Krainisch Ständisches Museum). Five years later, the Austrian Emperor Francis I decided to personally sponsor the museum and ordered its renaming to "Provincial Museum of Carniola". In 1882, the museum was renamed to "Provincial Museum of Carniola - Rudolfinum" in honour of the Crown Prince Rudolph.

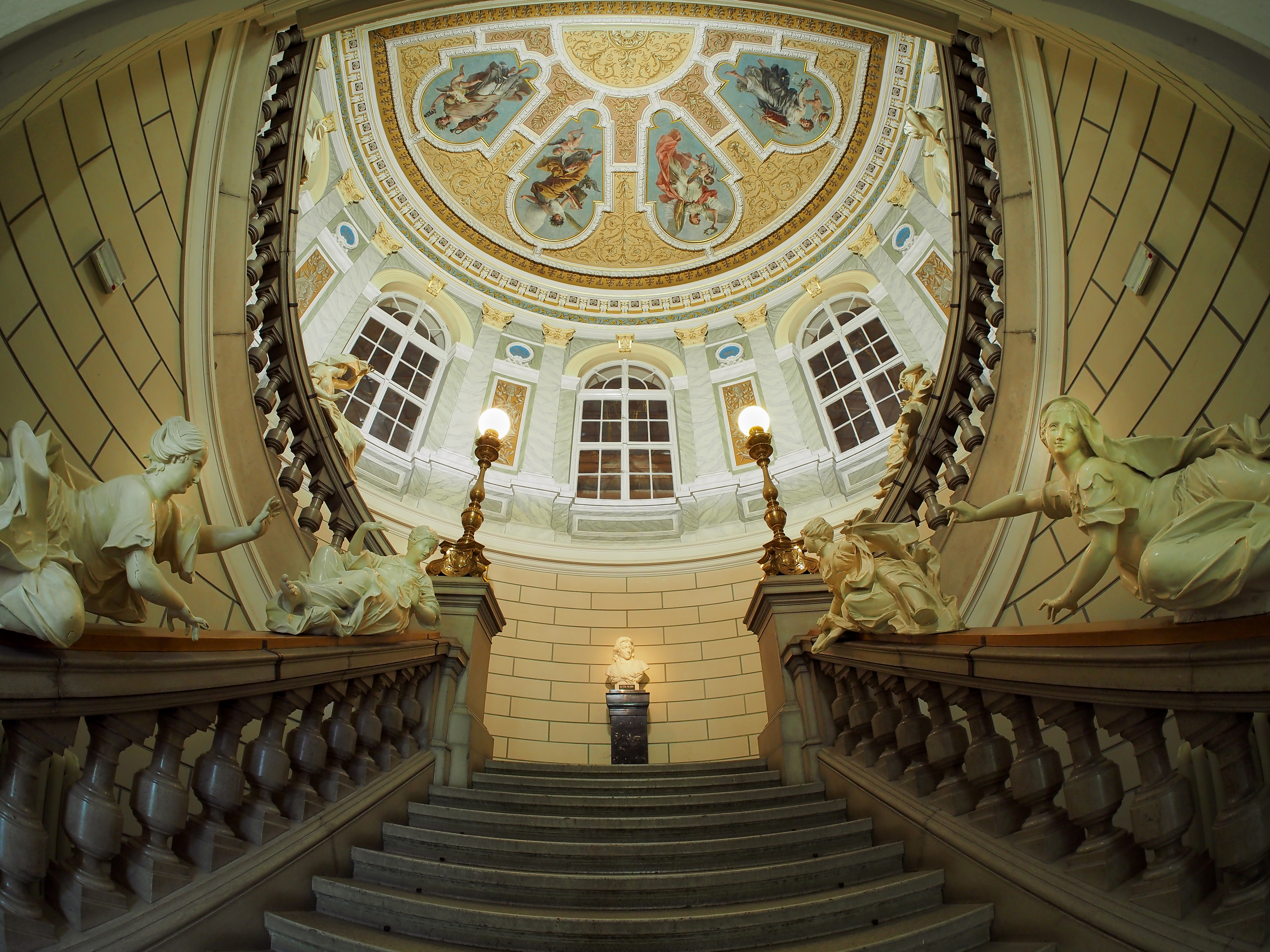
Staircase with ceiling

After the establishment of the Kingdom of Serbs, Croats and Slovenes, the name was changed to "National Museum". In 1923 the ethnographic collections possessed by the museum were removed and placed in the new Slovene Ethnographic Museum and in 1933 much of its fine artwork was moved to the National Gallery of Slovenia. In 1944 the Slovenian Museum of Natural History (then known as the Museum of Natural Sciences) became independent despite being located in the same building. In 1953 the majority of archives were moved to the Gruber Palace.

In 1985 Vesna Bučić, who had been employed at the museum and was then a consultant, was given the Valvasor Award.

Renamed to National Museum of Slovenia in 1992, today the museum is divided into the Archaeological Department, Numismatic Cabinet, Department of Prints and Drawings, and Department of History and Applied Arts.

== The building ==
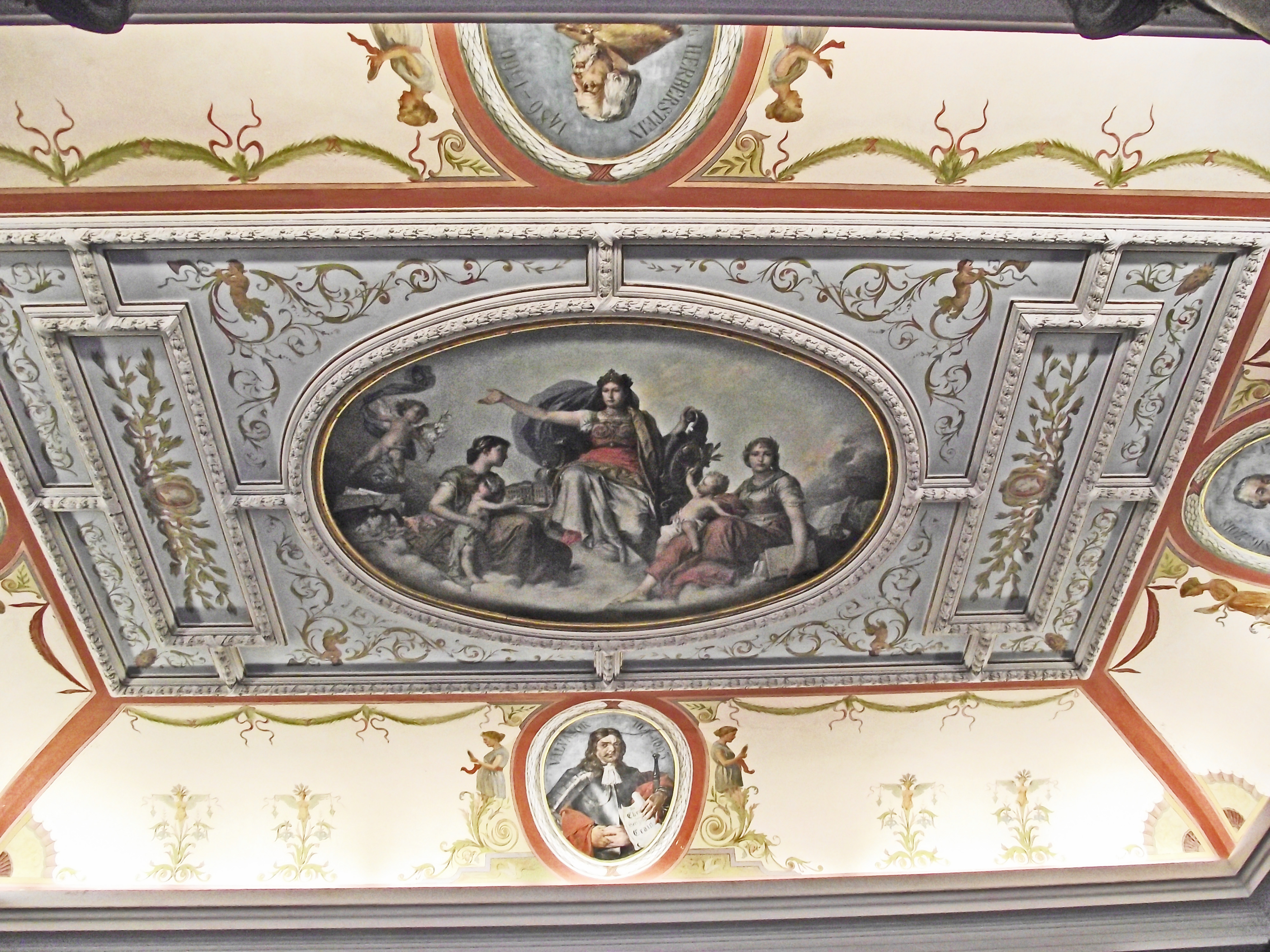
The ceiling of the museum, with paintings by Janez and Jurij Šubic and decoration by Karel Lipovšek

The main building of the National Museum is located close to the Slovenian Parliament building and the Slovenian Foreign Ministry, while the Ljubljana Opera House stands just opposite to it on the same square. It was built in the Neo-Renaissance style by the master builder Wilhelm Treo in collaboration with Jan Vladimír Hráský between 1883 and 1885. Treo mostly followed the plans by the Viennese architect Wilhelm Rezori.

The interior was designed by Hráský, with the ceiling of the main hall decorated with medaillons by the painters Janez and Jurij Šubic. These were created in 1885. Janez Šubic drew the main allegorical painting of Carniola as the protector of arts and sciences, whereas Jurij Šubic drew four portraits of famous Carniolans: Johann Weikhard von Valvasor, Valentin Vodnik, Sigmund Herberstein and Sigmund Zois. The painting by Janez was made with oil on wood, whereas the portraits were made with oil on fresh plaster. The painters followed the proposals of their teacher Janez Wolf. The space between the medaillons was decorated by Karel Lipovšek.

The building was opened on 2 December 1888. In the Slovene Lands, this was the first building used solely for cultural purposes. A bronze monument to the Carniolan polymath Johann Weikhard von Valvasor, designed by the sculptor Alojz Gangl, was placed in front of the museum in 1903.

== Permanent exhibitions ==
Exhibition Name	Start date	Location
Roman Lapidarium	June 15, 2006	Muzejska, Slovenia
The History and Arts Collections	March 12, 2008	Metelkova, Slovenia
Snežnik Castle Museum	June 20, 2008	Sneznik, Slovenia
The Late Antiquity Ad Pirum Fort	January 12, 2013	Ad Pirum, Slovenia
Stories from the Crossroads	August 23, 2014	Muzejska, Slovenia
Bled Castle Museum	January 1, 2015	Bled, Slovenia
Egyptian Collection	February 1, 2017	Muzejska, Slovenia

== Selected directors and collaborators ==
- Karl Deschmann (1821–1889)
- Josip Mal (1884–1978)
- Avgust Pirjevec (1887–1944)
- Simon Rutar (1851–1903)
- Boris M. Gombač (born 1945)
