= Gozd, Kamnik =

Gozd
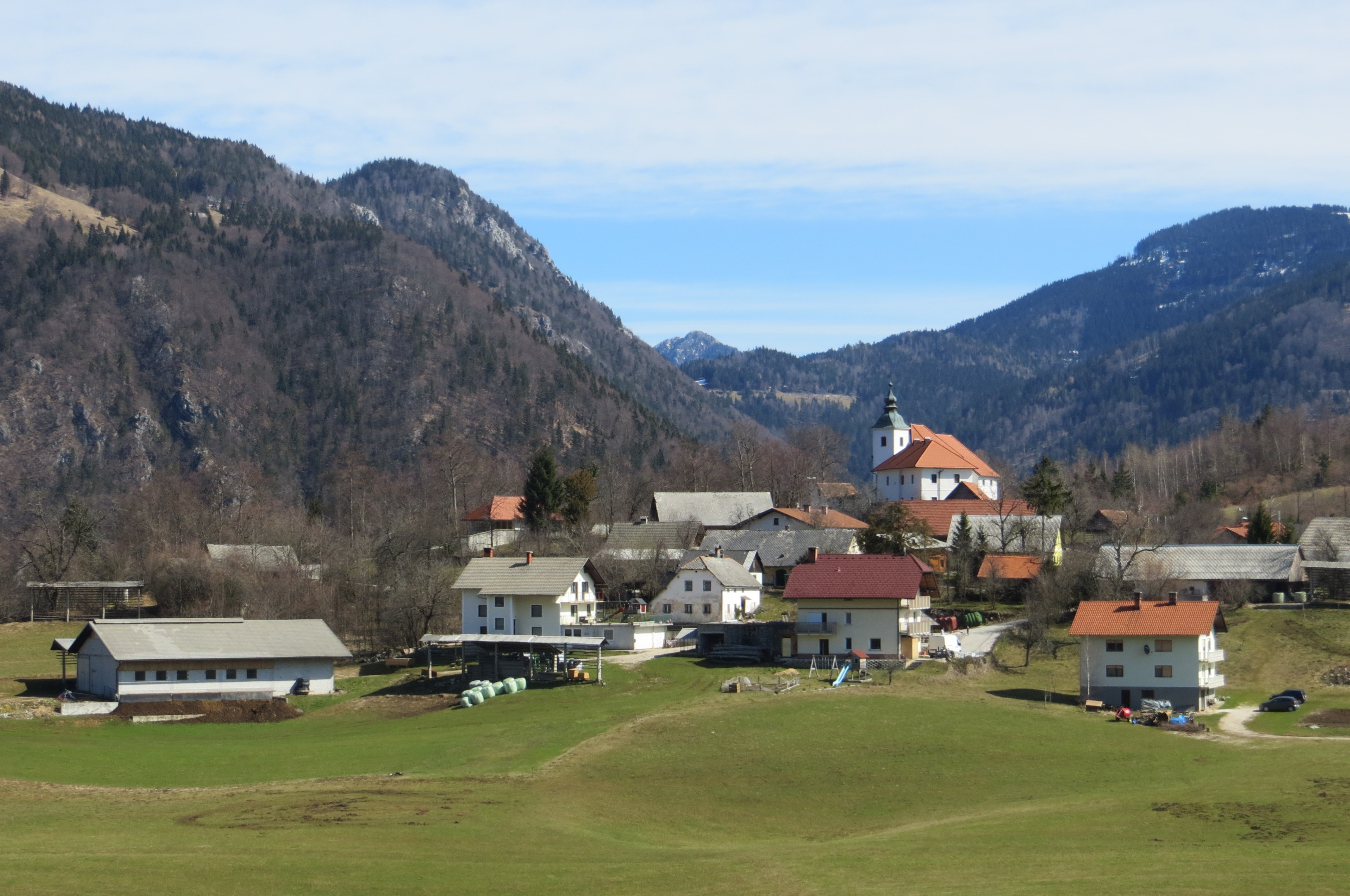

- Location in Slovenia
- Coordinates: 46°15′24.84″N 14°39′18.38″E
- Country: Slovenia
- Traditional region: Upper Carniola
- Statistical region: Central Slovenia
- Municipality: Kamnik
- Elevation: 783.5 m (2,571 ft)

Population (2002)
  - Total: 140

Gozd (pronounced [ˈɡɔst]; German: Goisd) is a small village in the Municipality of Kamnik in the Upper Carniola region of Slovenia. It includes the hamlets of Brška Vas (Slovene: Brška vas), Gornja Vas (Gornja vas), and Laze (German: Laase), as well as several isolated farms: Zabrezje or Brezovje, Brezovnik, Repovničar, Kajžar, Strahon, Hrastnik, Breg, and Zabrinje.

== Name ==
The settlement was historically attested under a variety of names: first as German Spizholz in 1257, and then as Latin in Silua (1313) and German auf dem Walde (1318). The Slovene name Gozd is semantically identical to the German and Latin names (meaning 'forest') and is derived from the common noun gozd 'forest'. Locally, the settlement is known as Gojzd (adjective form gojški), and the Gozd Pasture (Slovene: Gojška planina) on the Big Pasture Plateau (Velika planina) is named after the village. In the past the German name was Goisd.

== Church ==
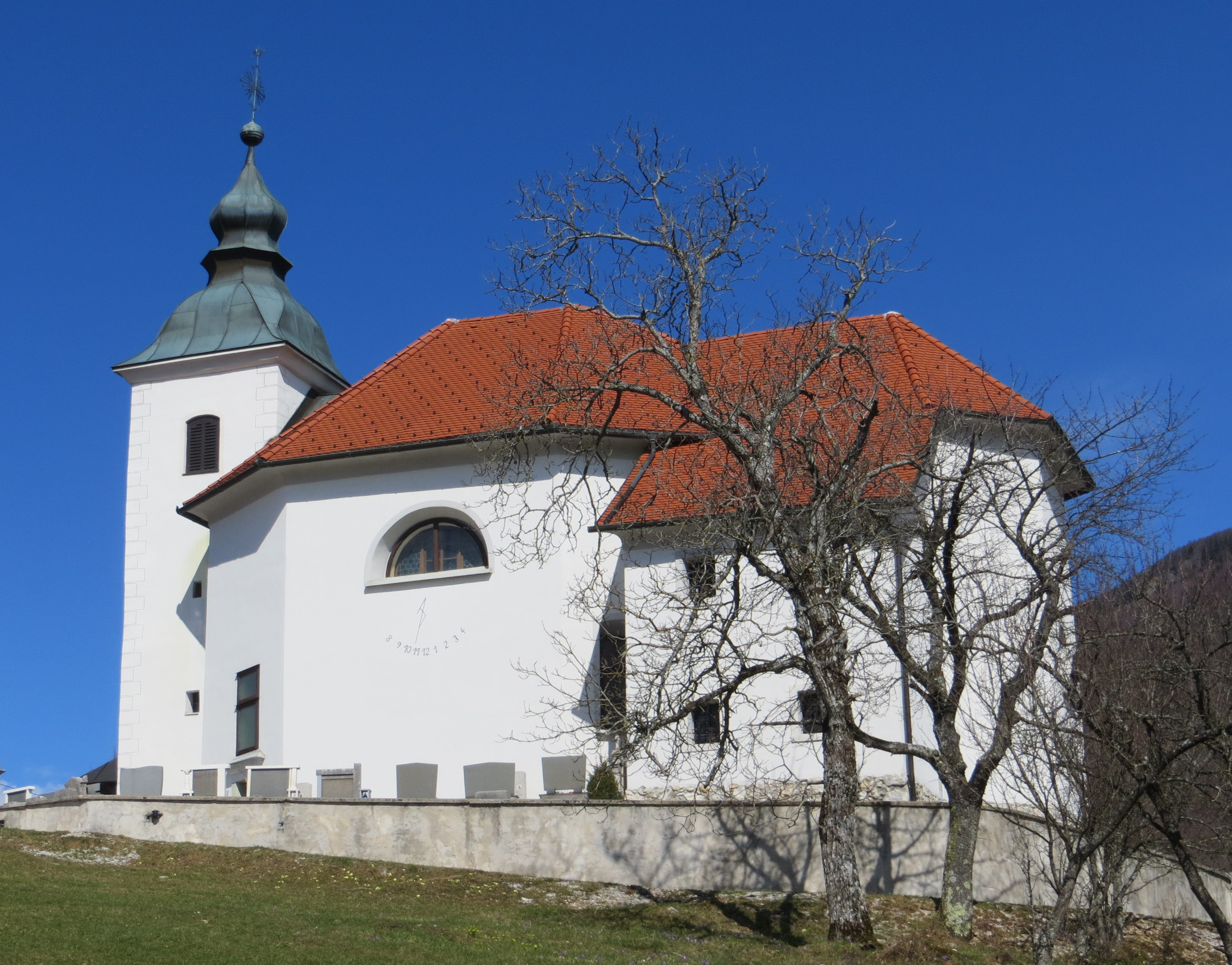
Saint Anne's Church

The parish church in the settlement is dedicated to Saint Anne.
