= Nevljica =

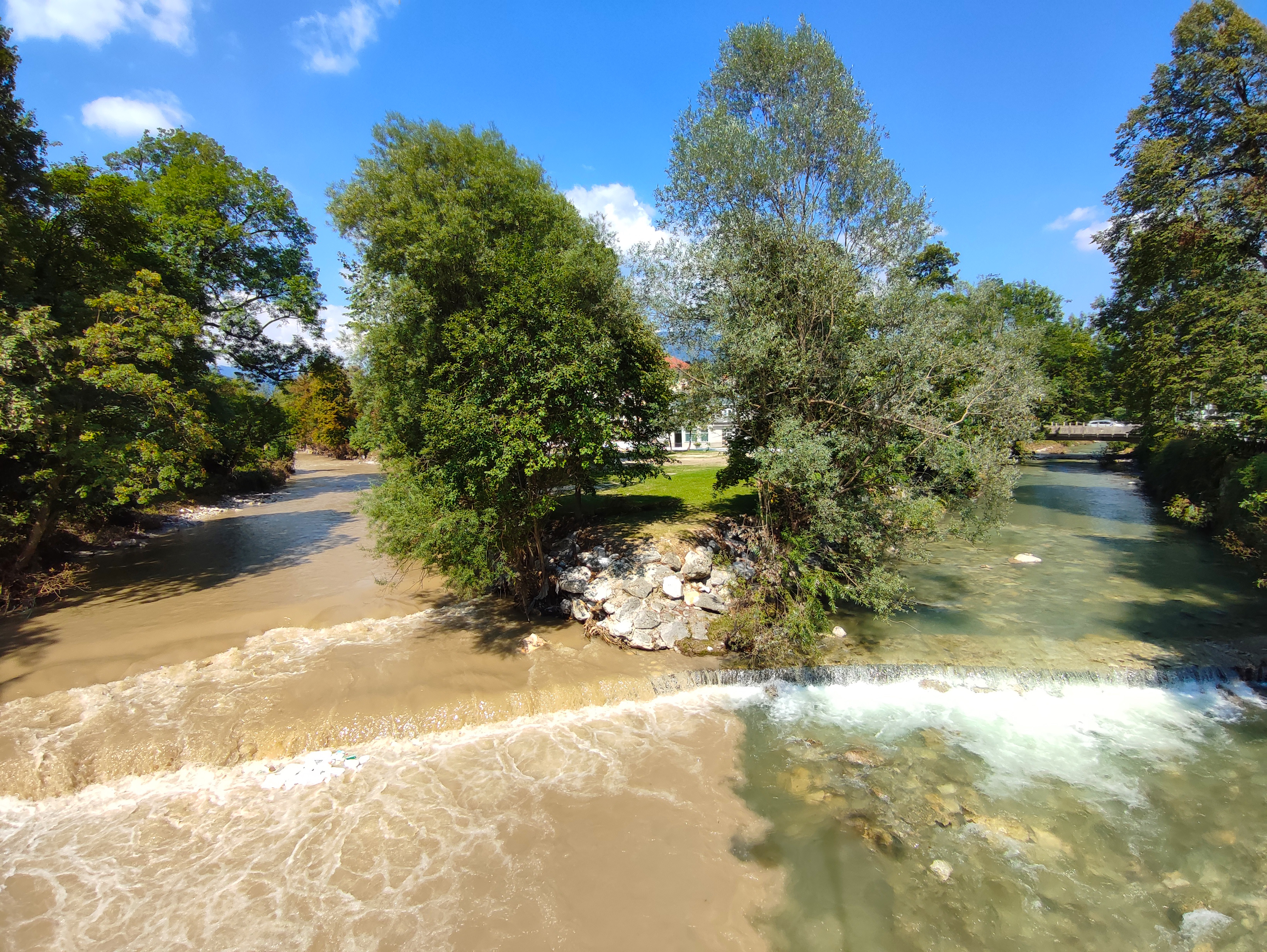
- Confluence of Nevljica river (right) and Kamnik Bistrica (left) after 2023 floods in Slovenia

Location
- Country: Slovenia

Physical characteristics
- Mouth
  - location: Kamnik Bistrica
  - coordinates: 46.2258°N 14.6145°E

Basin features
- Progression: Kamnik Bistrica→ Sava→ Danube→ Black Sea

The Nevljica is a river in the Municipality of Kamnik, Slovenia. It has its source below Kozjak Hill (737 m, near Črni Vrh v Tuhinju) and flows through the Tuhinj Valley. It also flows through the settlements of Nevlje and Mekinje. It is a left tributary of the Kamnik Bistrica.

== Bridges ==
There are two notable bridges over Nevljica:

- The Mammoth Bridge (Slovene: Mamutov most) in Nevlje.
- The bridge over the Nevljica in Mekinje, built between 1952 and 1955. Its location was chosen by Jože Plečnik, and its detailed plans were drawn up by his assistant Anton Bitenc based on Plečnik's plans.

== 1938 finds ==
In January 1938, due to erosion and frequent flooding, the administration of the Drava Banovina started to regulate the bed of the river. In addition, a bridge was to be built. On 14 March 1938, workers at the site found objects that were later shown to be an almost complete skeleton of a woolly mammoth (Mammuthus primigenius). An Upper Paleolithic archaeological site was established in Nevlje. Remains of other animals as well as a human tool were found, and it was shown that around 22,000 years ago there was a human hunting settlement in the area. The skeleton gave its name to the bridge over the river in Nevlje.
