= Stahovica =

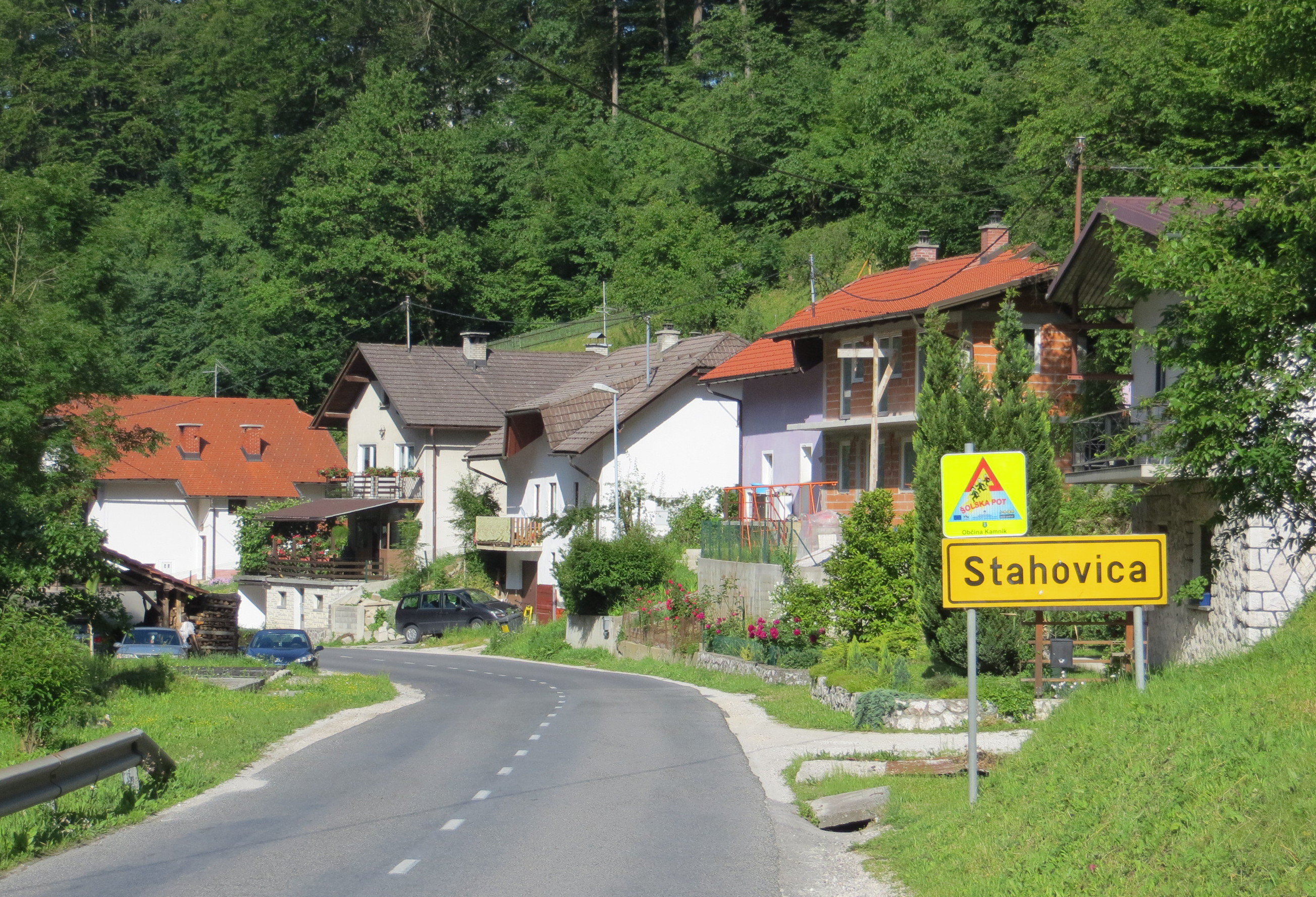

- Location in Slovenia
- Coordinates: 46°16′16.76″N 14°36′24.31″E
- Country: Slovenia
- Traditional region: Upper Carniola
- Statistical region: Central Slovenia
- Municipality: Kamnik

Area
  - Total: 1.89 km^{2} (0.73 sq mi)
- Elevation: 442.9 m (1,453 ft)

Population (2002)
  - Total: 187

Stahovica (pronounced [staˈxoːʋitsa]) is a settlement that stretches along the road leading into the upper Kamnik Bistrica Valley in the Municipality of Kamnik in the Upper Carniola region of Slovenia.
