= Kamnik Bistrica =

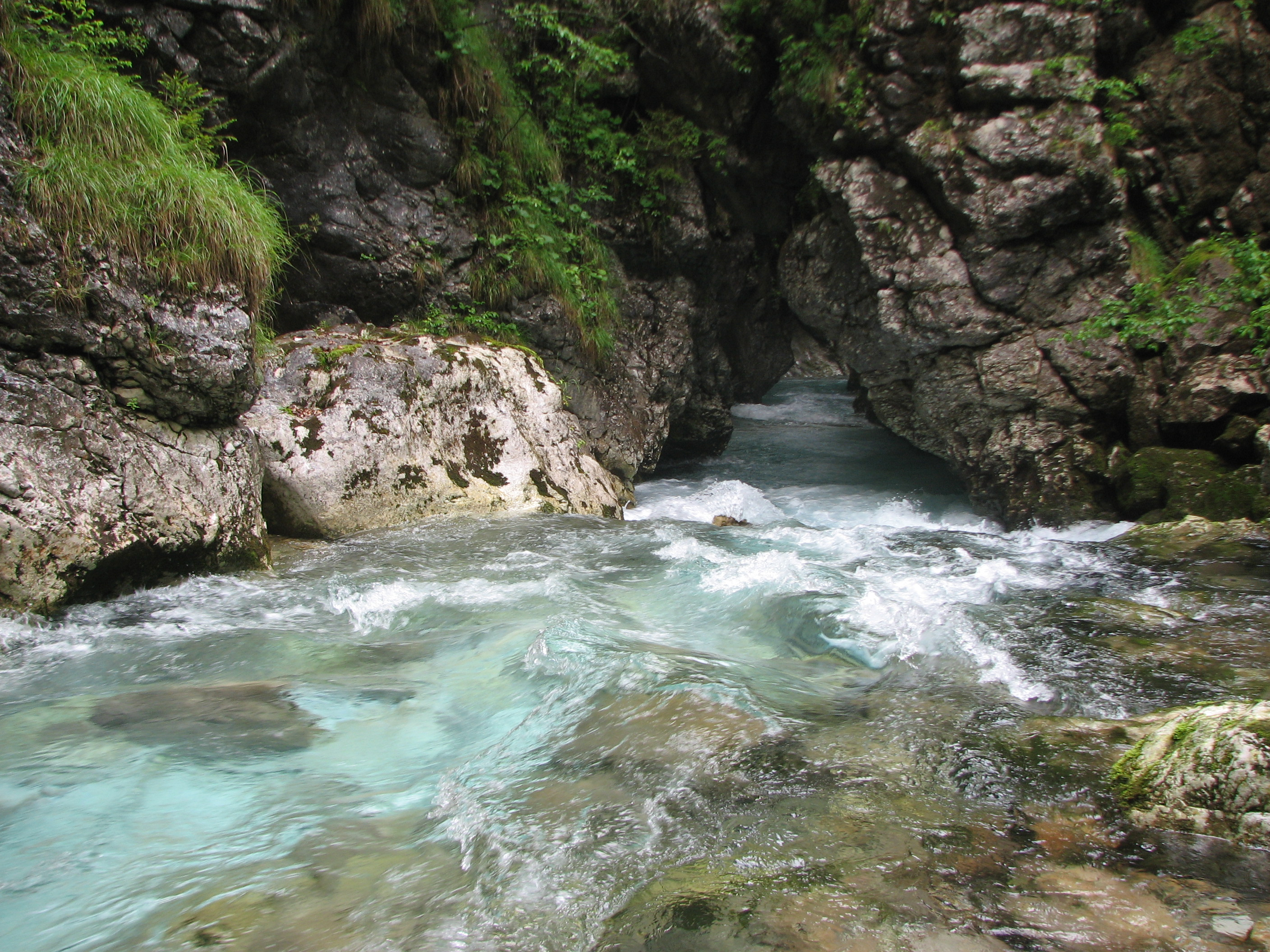
- The upper course of the Kamnik Bistrica as it enters the Predoselj Gorge

Location
- Country: Slovenia

Physical characteristics
- Source
  - location: near the Kamnik Bistrica Lodge, Kamnik–Savinja Alps
  - coordinates: 46°19′40.4″N 14°35′14.68″E
  - elevation: 600 m (2,000 ft)
- Mouth
  - location: the Sava, near Videm east of Ljubljana
  - coordinates: 46.0760°N 14.6387°E
  - elevation: 261 m (856 ft)
- Length: 33 km (21 mi)
- Basin size: 530 km^{2} (200 sq mi)
- Discharge
  - average: 20.9 m^{3}/s (740 cu ft/s)

Basin features
- Progression: Sava→ Danube→ Black Sea
- Tributaries
  - left: Nevljica

The Kamnik Bistrica (Slovene: Kamniška Bistrica, pronounced [ˈkáːmniʃka ˈbíːstritsa]) is an Alpine river in northern Slovenia, a left tributary of the Sava River. It springs from the Kamnik Alps (part of the Southern Limestone Alps) near the border with Austria. It is 33 km (21 mi) long. The Kamnik Bistrica flows through the town of Kamnik, where it is fed by the Nevljica River. It flows into the Sava south of Videm, about 10 km east of Ljubljana.

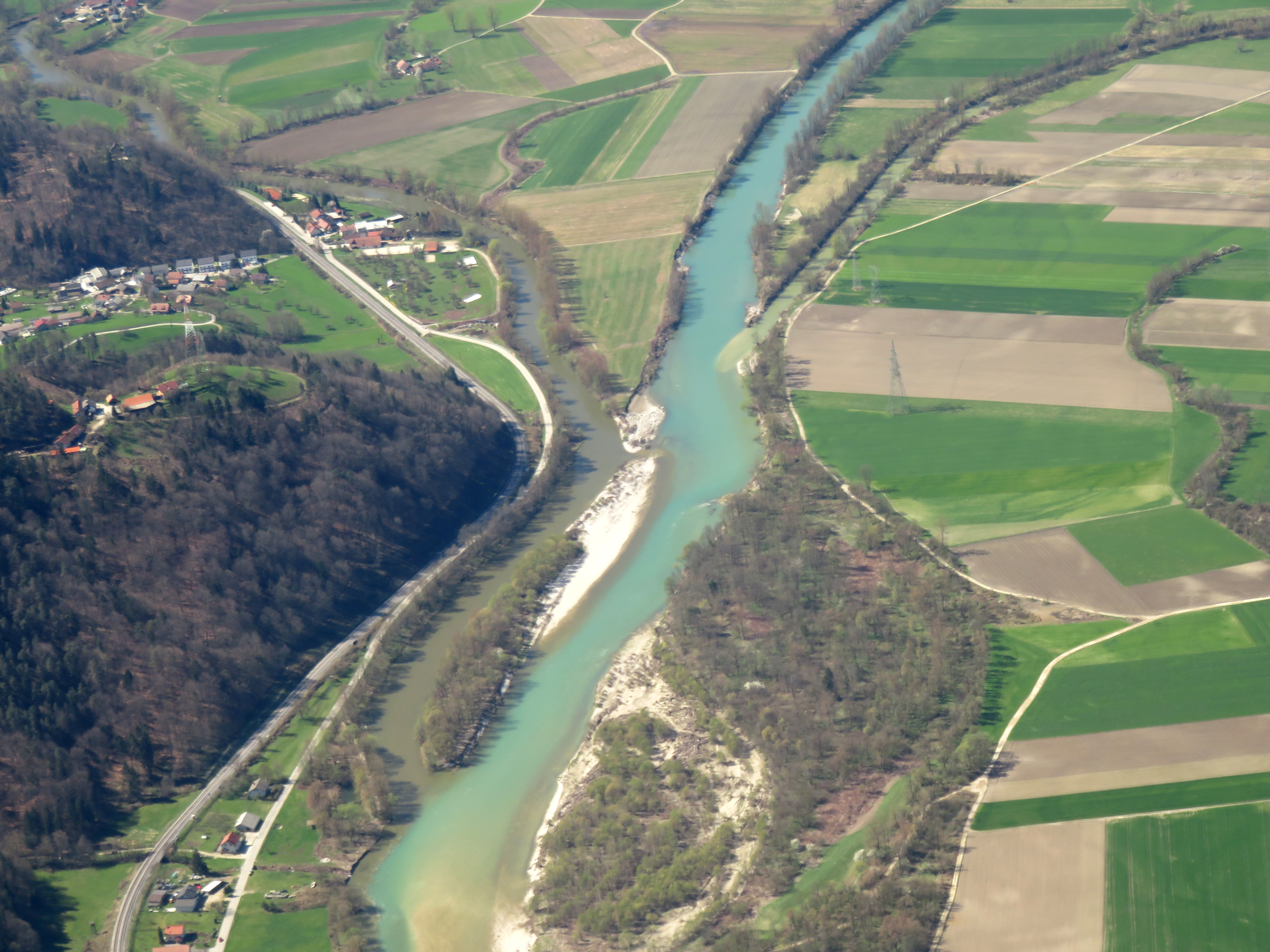
Confluence of the Kamnik Bistrica (right) with the Sava and Ljubljanica

== Course and catchment geology ==
The Kamnik Bistrica rises from a karst spring at about 630 m above sea level on the southern flank of the Kamnik–Savinja Alps and follows a steep, 32.8 km course southeast to join the Sava near Domžale. Draining roughly 380 km^{2} of mostly forested limestone and dolomite highlands, the river begins as an ice-cold, crystal-clear alpine stream but gathers both flow and sediment as it descends through a succession of narrow glacial valleys, gravelly floodplains, and finally lowland terraces of Pleistocene and Holocene age. Its principal tributaries are the left-bank Črna and Nevljica and the right-bank Pšata; the Črna in particular carries legacy clays and metal-rich runoff from an abandoned kaolin mine, marking the point (at Stahovica) where the water quality first reflects significant human influence. Mean discharge at the confluence with the Sava is about 15 cubic metres per second, but the alpine snow–rain regime drives sharp seasonal contrasts: peaks in late spring and again in November, with the lowest flows in August and February.

== Hydrology and water chemistry ==
Although short, the river is an instructive natural laboratory. The upper gorge slices through solid Triassic limestones and dolomites; these readily dissolve and charge the water with calcium and magnesium bicarbonate (the form of dissolved carbonic acid familiar from sparkling water). Further downstream, Miocene-age marlstones, sandstone lenses and thick soils add minor silica and organic acids, while the valley floor gravels allow rapid groundwater exchange. Chemical surveys show bicarbonate concentrations typically between 1.9 and 5.6 mmol/l, with a calcium-to-magnesium ratio around 0.33—diagnostic of active calcite weathering. The water is usually saturated (often supersaturated) with respect to both calcite and dolomite, and the partial pressure of dissolved CO_{2} can reach twenty-five times the atmospheric value, so the river acts as a net source of CO_{2} to the air as it tumbles downstream.

Isotopic and mass balance analysis confirms that weathering of the carbonate bedrock supplies roughly one-quarter to two-fifths of the dissolved inorganic carbon delivered to the Sava; the remainder arrives with tributary inflows or is generated in-stream by the decay of organic matter, while only a few per cent is exchanged directly with the atmosphere. In practical terms this means that the Kamnik Bistrica, despite its modest size, plays an outsized role in transferring rock-bound carbon back to the climate system and in buffering regional water hardness. The same chemical processes also explain the river's vivid turquoise pools and the fast deposition of tufa on submerged roots and rocks, features that make the upper valley a popular walking destination.
