= Pirševo =

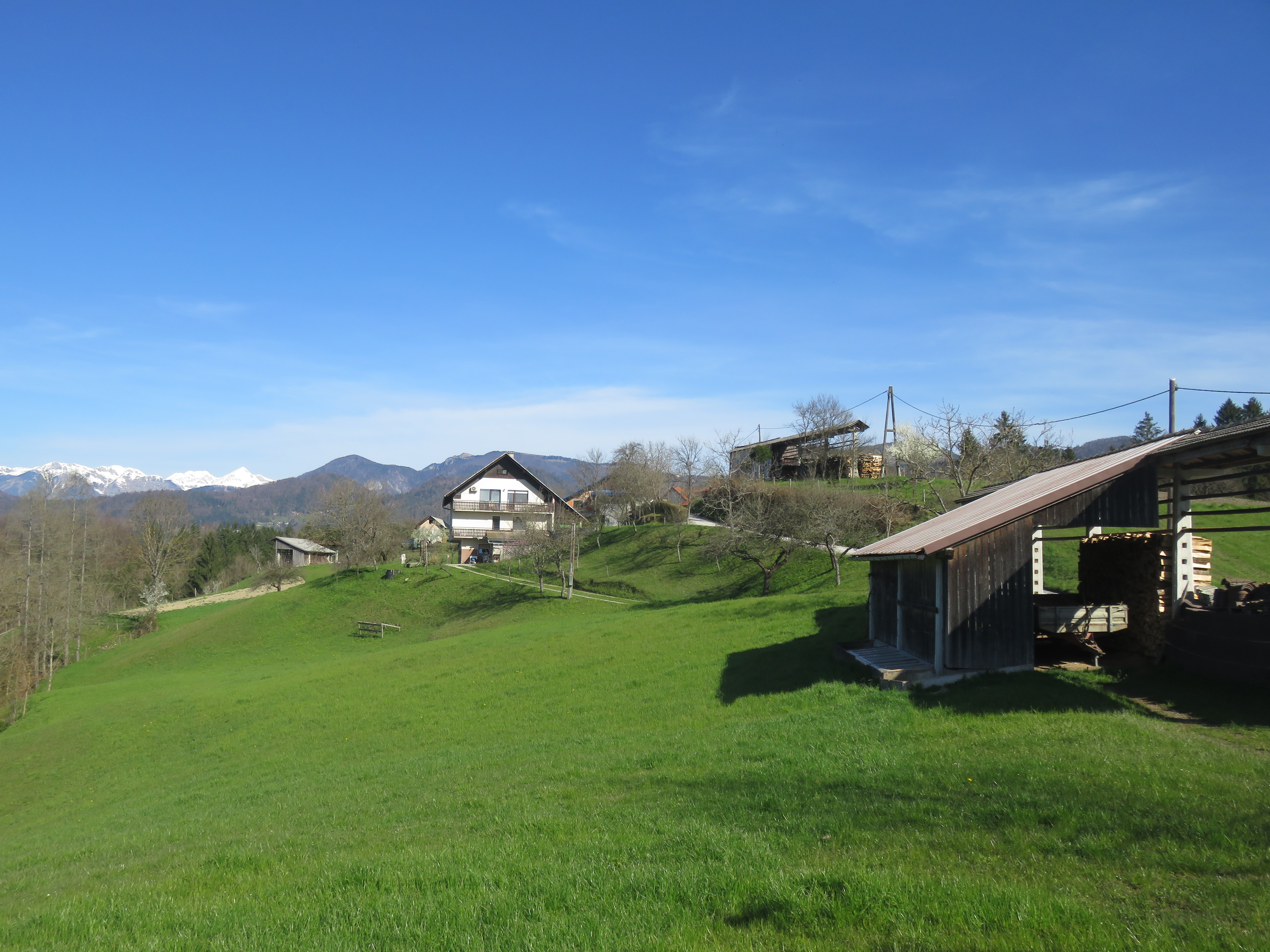

- Location in Slovenia
- Coordinates: 46°13′28.76″N 14°42′25.78″E
- Country: Slovenia
- Traditional region: Upper Carniola
- Statistical region: Central Slovenia
- Municipality: Kamnik

Area
  - Total: 0.96 km^{2} (0.37 sq mi)
- Elevation: 513.3 m (1,684 ft)

Population (2002)
  - Total: 29

Pirševo (pronounced [ˈpiːɾʃɛʋɔ]) is a small settlement in the Tuhinj Valley in the Municipality of Kamnik in the Upper Carniola region of Slovenia.
