= Praproče v Tuhinju =

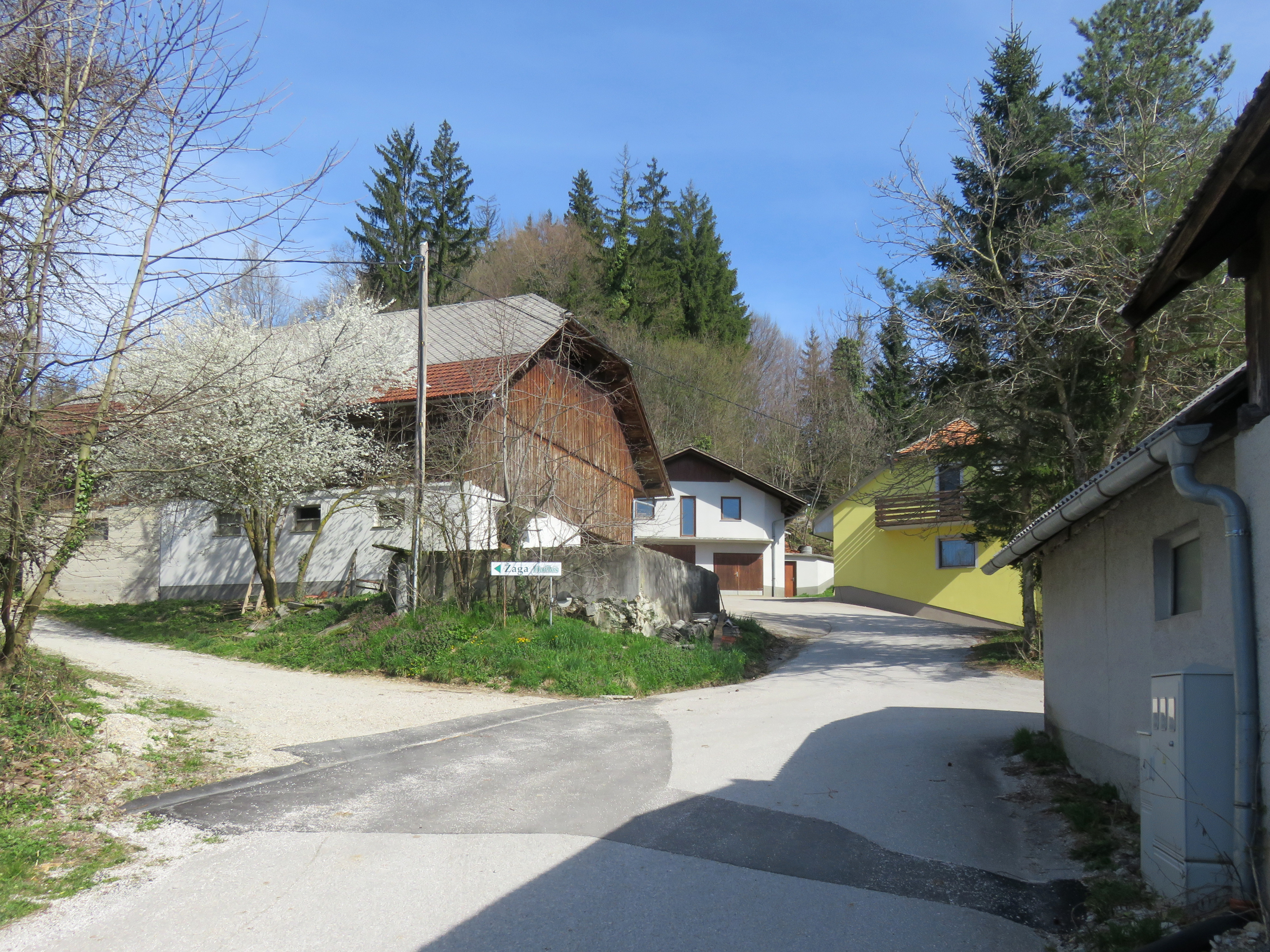

- Location in Slovenia
- Coordinates: 46°14′11.61″N 14°43′5.23″E
- Country: Slovenia
- Traditional region: Upper Carniola
- Statistical region: Central Slovenia
- Municipality: Kamnik

Area
  - Total: 1.19 km^{2} (0.46 sq mi)
- Elevation: 729.7 m (2,394 ft)

Population (2002)
  - Total: 20

Praproče v Tuhinju (pronounced [ˈpɾaːpɾɔtʃɛ ʍ tuˈxiːnju]) is a small settlement above the Tuhinj Valley in the Municipality of Kamnik in the Upper Carniola region of Slovenia.

== Name ==
The name of the settlement was changed from Praproče to Praproče v Tuhinju in 1955.
