= Zgornje Stranje =

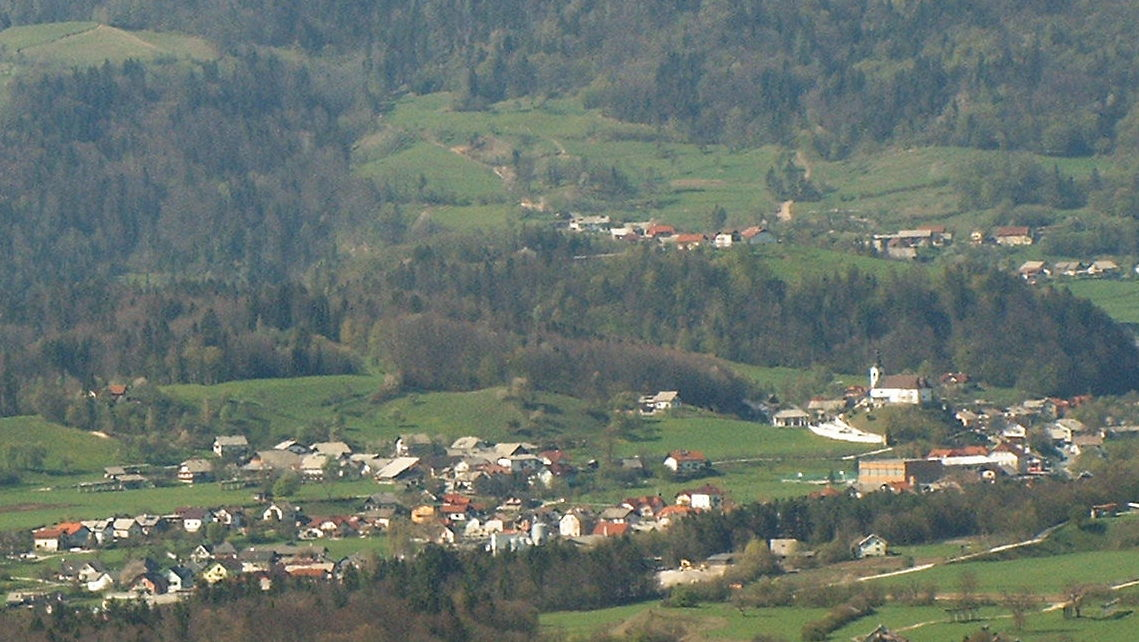
- Zgornje Stranje with Zagorica and Kregarjevo in the background

- Location in Slovenia
- Coordinates: 46°15′22.27″N 14°36′2.28″E
- Country: Slovenia
- Traditional region: Upper Carniola
- Statistical region: Central Slovenia
- Municipality: Kamnik

Area
  - Total: 0.74 km^{2} (0.29 sq mi)
- Elevation: 429.6 m (1,409 ft)

Population (2002)
  - Total: 384

Zgornje Stranje (pronounced [ˈzɡoːɾnjɛ ˈstɾaːnjɛ]; German: Oberstreine) is a village on a terrace on the right bank of the Kamnik Bistrica River in the Municipality of Kamnik in the Upper Carniola region of Slovenia.
