= Bistričica =

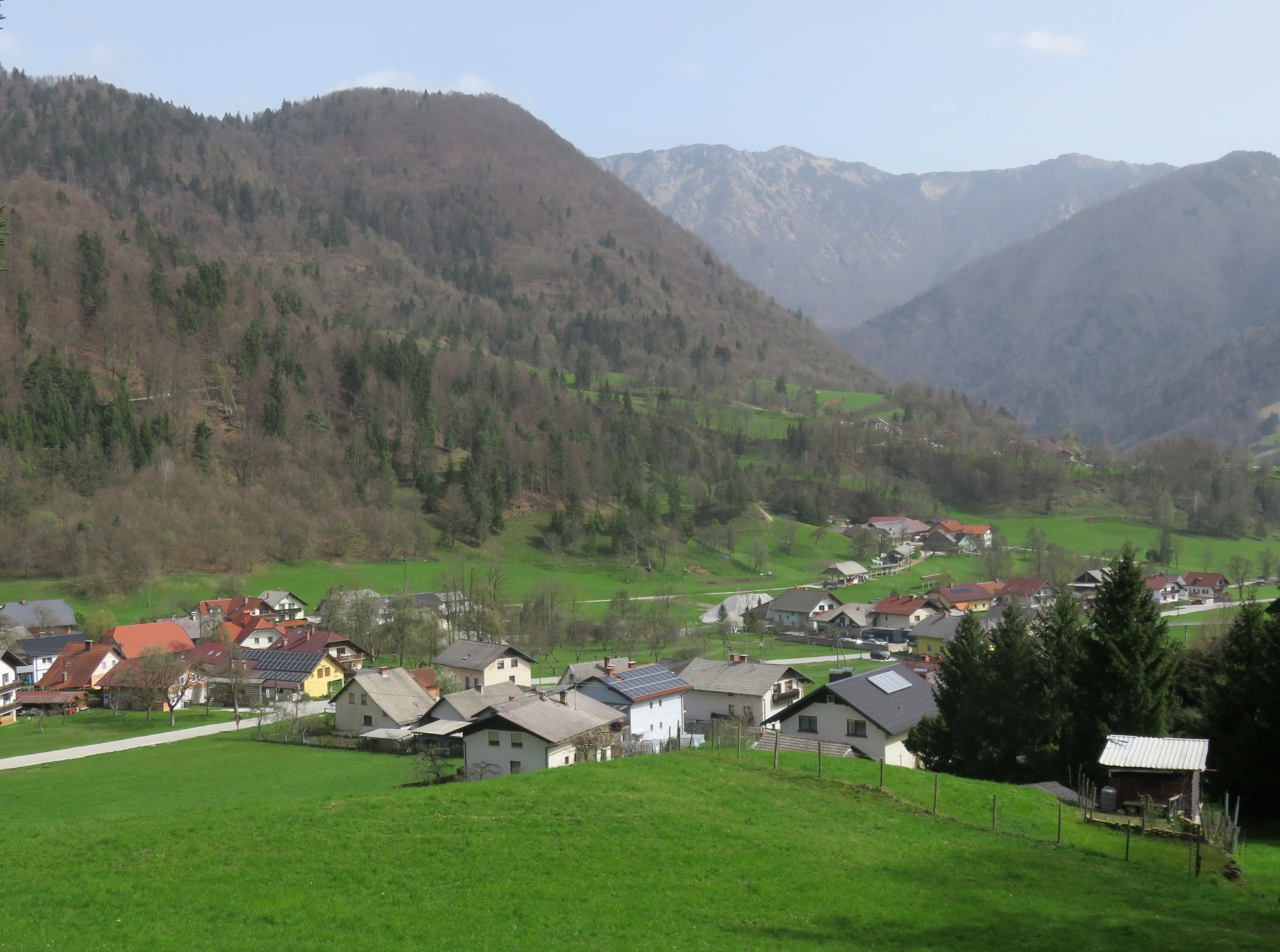

- Location in Slovenia
- Coordinates: 46°16′0.63″N 14°35′10.63″E
- Country: Slovenia
- Traditional region: Upper Carniola
- Statistical region: Central Slovenia
- Municipality: Kamnik
- Elevation: 480.9 m (1,578 ft)

Population (2016)
  - Total: 273

Bistričica (pronounced [ˈbiːstɾitʃitsa]; German: Wisterschitz) is a settlement in the Municipality of Kamnik in the Upper Carniola region of Slovenia.

== Name ==
Bistričica was attested in written sources as Veustritz in 1323, Fewstricz in 1419, Nabystrziczi in 1426, Wenigen Fewstricz in 1436, and Klain Fewstricz in 1468, among other spellings.
