= Spodnje Palovče =

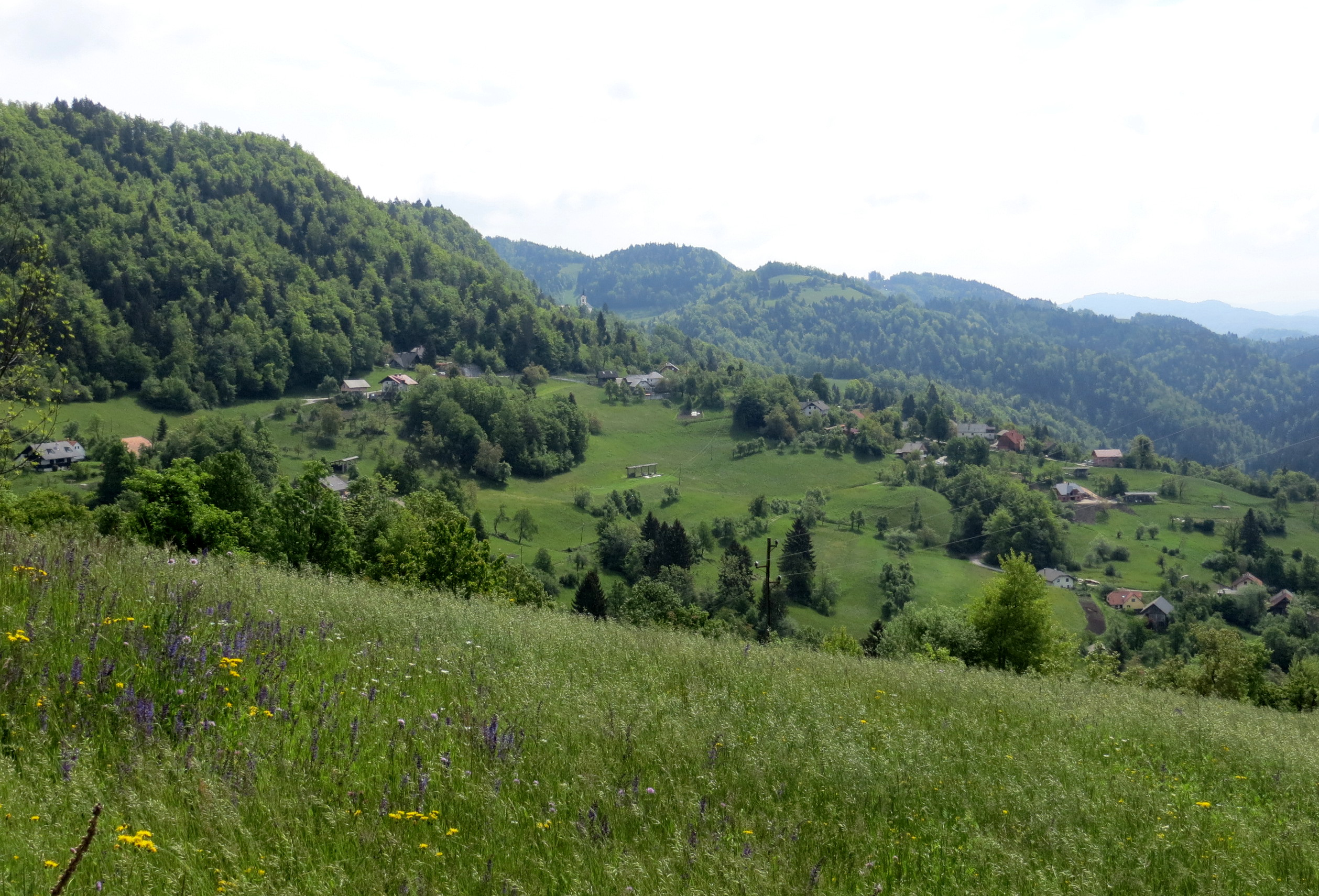

- Location in Slovenia
- Coordinates: 46°12′35.85″N 14°39′46.5″E
- Country: Slovenia
- Traditional region: Upper Carniola
- Statistical region: Central Slovenia
- Municipality: Kamnik

Area
  - Total: 1.81 km^{2} (0.70 sq mi)
- Elevation: 594.5 m (1,950 ft)

Population (2002)
  - Total: 70

Spodnje Palovče (pronounced [ˈspoːdnjɛ ˈpaːlɔu̯tʃɛ]; in older sources also Spodnje Paloviče, German: Unterpalowitsch) is a settlement in the hills east of Kamnik in the Upper Carniola region of Slovenia.
