= Spodnje Stranje =

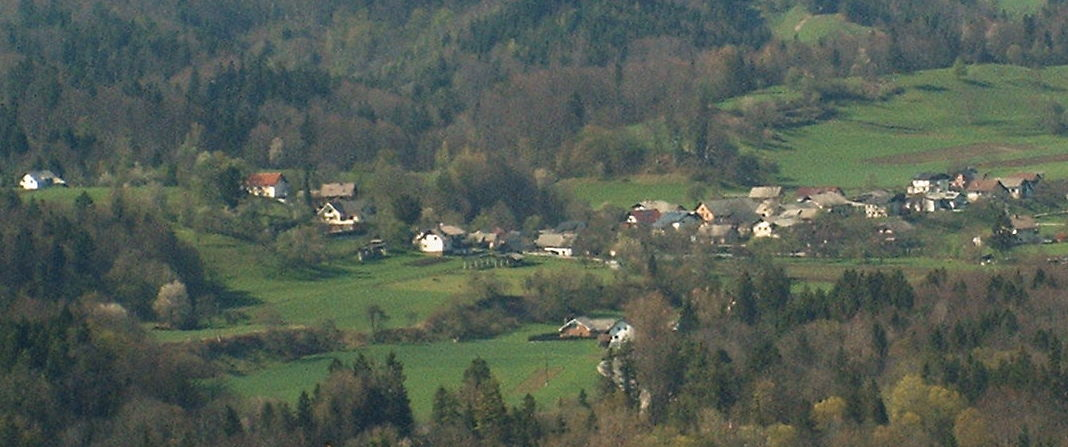

- Location in Slovenia
- Coordinates: 46°15′3.79″N 14°35′57.75″E
- Country: Slovenia
- Traditional region: Upper Carniola
- Statistical region: Central Slovenia
- Municipality: Kamnik

Area
  - Total: 0.47 km^{2} (0.18 sq mi)
- Elevation: 424.9 m (1,394 ft)

Population (2002)
  - Total: 209

Spodnje Stranje (pronounced [ˈspoːdnjɛ ˈstɾaːnjɛ]; German: Unterstreine) is a settlement on the right bank of the Kamnik Bistrica River in the Municipality of Kamnik in the Upper Carniola region of Slovenia.
