= Mali Rakitovec =

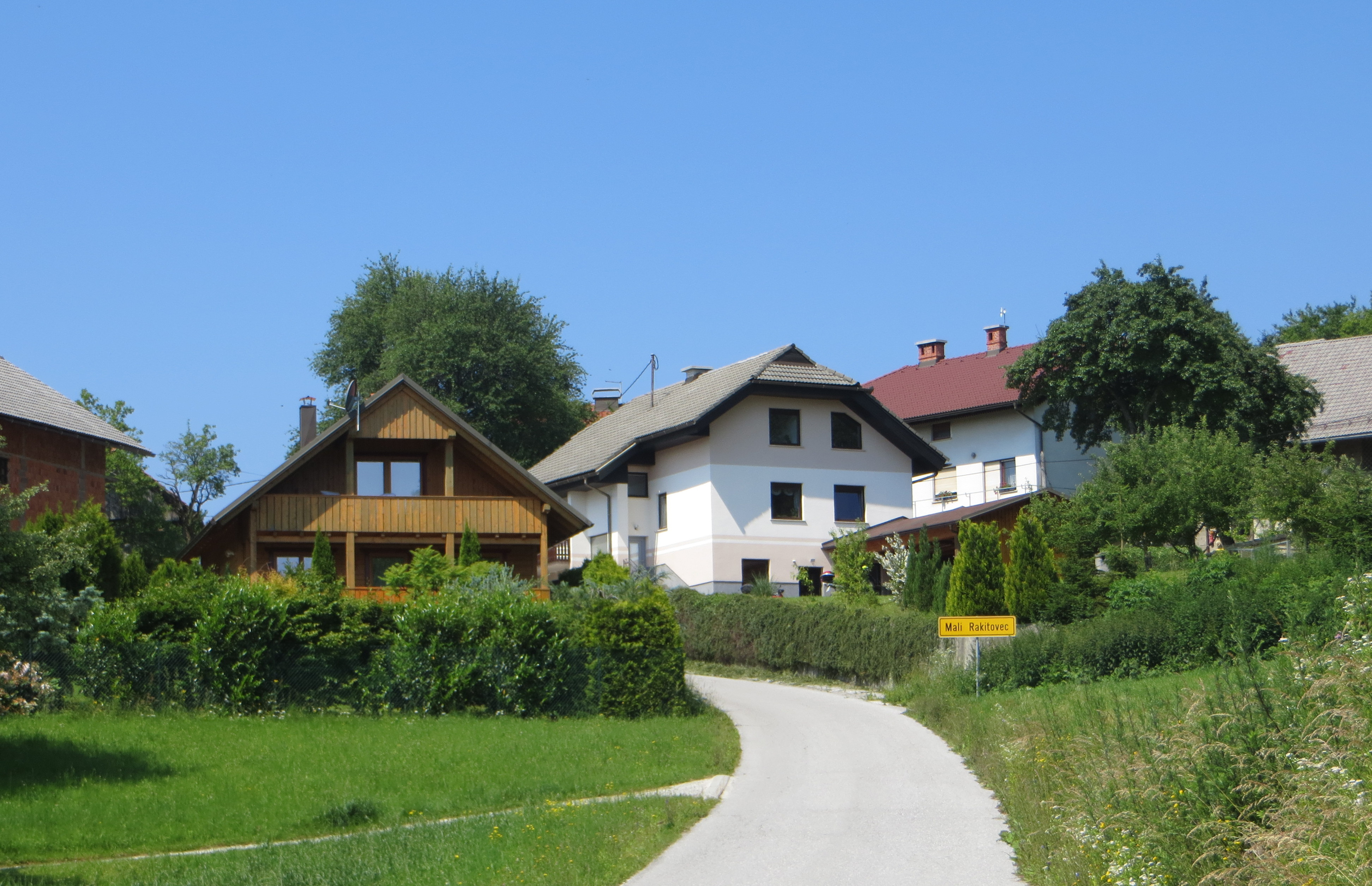

- Location in Slovenia
- Coordinates: 46°11′51.82″N 14°46′33.04″E
- Country: Slovenia
- Traditional region: Upper Carniola
- Statistical region: Central Slovenia
- Municipality: Kamnik

Area
  - Total: 1.12 km^{2} (0.43 sq mi)
- Elevation: 856.4 m (2,810 ft)

Population (2002)
  - Total: 39

Mali Rakitovec (pronounced [ˈmaːli ɾaˈkiːtɔʋəts]; German: Kleinrakitowitz) is a small village in the Municipality of Kamnik in the Upper Carniola region of Slovenia.
