= Jeranovo =

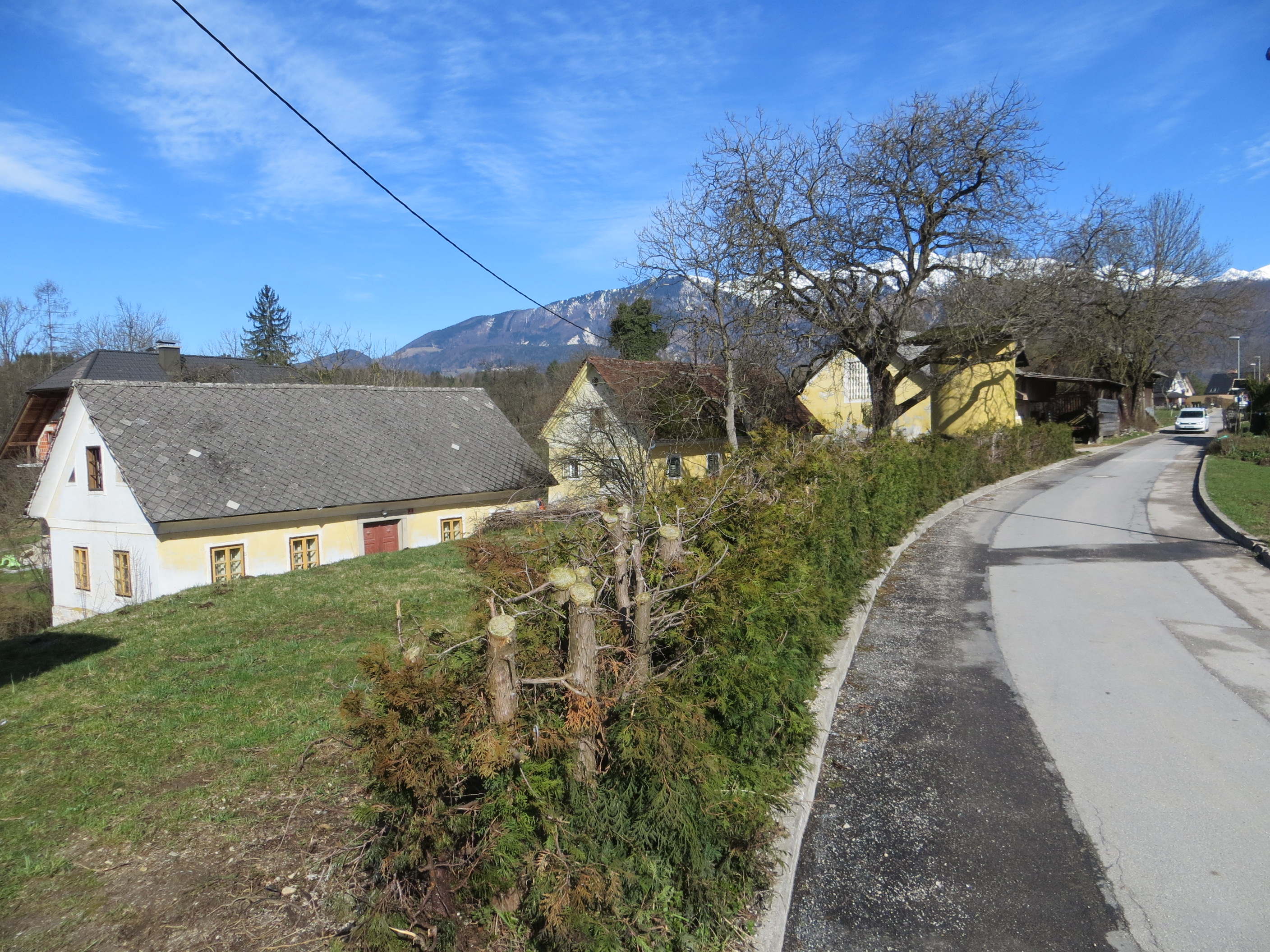

- Location in Slovenia
- Coordinates: 46°14′23.1″N 14°36′33.52″E
- Country: Slovenia
- Traditional region: Upper Carniola
- Statistical region: Central Slovenia
- Municipality: Kamnik
- Elevation: 401.2 m (1,316 ft)

Population (2002)
  - Total: 83

Jeranovo (pronounced [jɛˈɾaːnɔʋɔ]) is a small settlement in the Municipality of Kamnik in the Upper Carniola region of Slovenia.
