= Oševek =

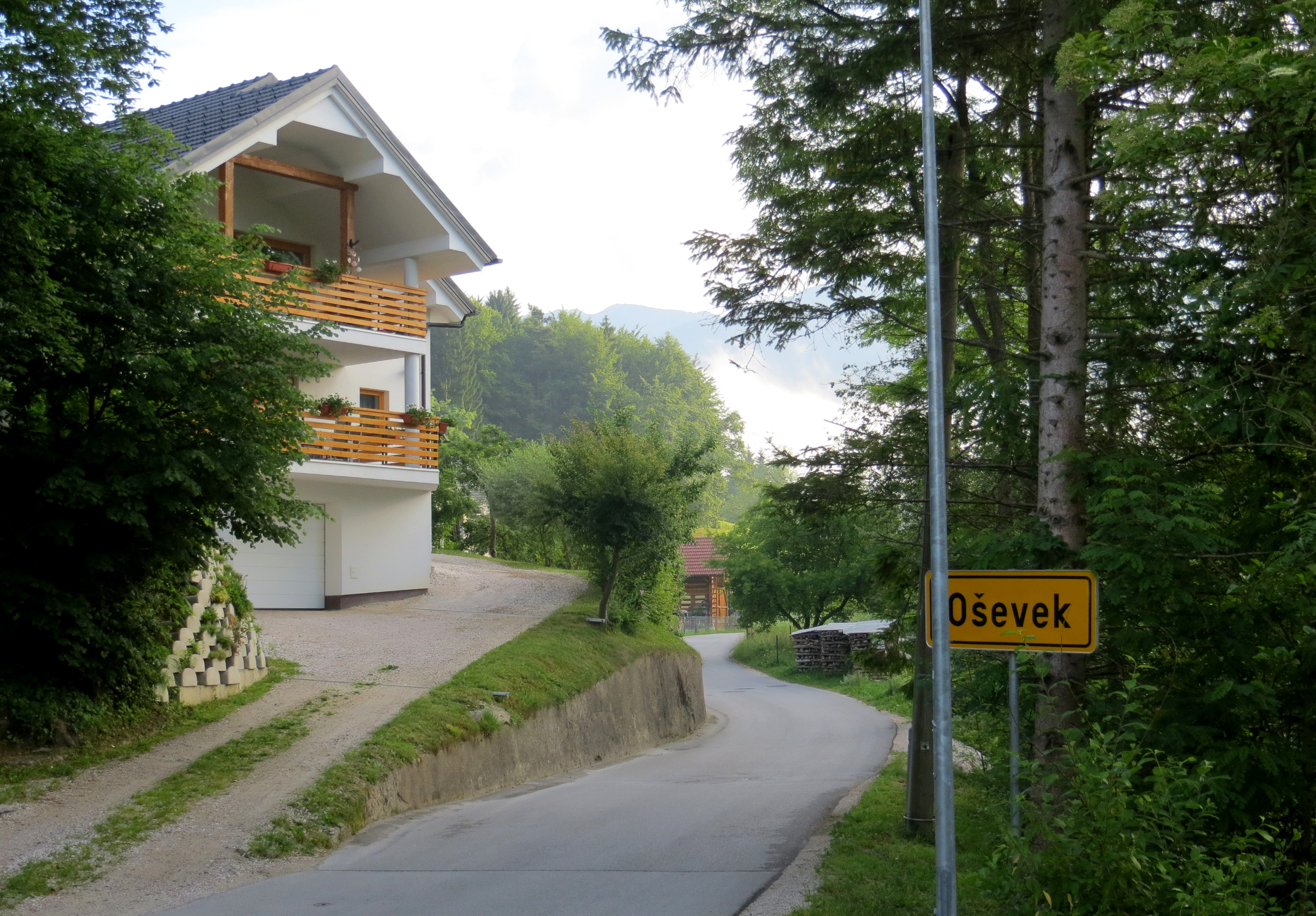

- Location in Slovenia
- Coordinates: 46°14′13.92″N 14°37′39.4″E
- Country: Slovenia
- Traditional region: Upper Carniola
- Statistical region: Central Slovenia
- Municipality: Kamnik

Area
  - Total: 0.80 km^{2} (0.31 sq mi)
- Elevation: 387.2 m (1,270 ft)

Population (2002)
  - Total: 29

Oševek (pronounced [ɔˈʃeːʋək]) is a small settlement in the Municipality of Kamnik in the Upper Carniola region of Slovenia.
