= Zgornje Palovče =

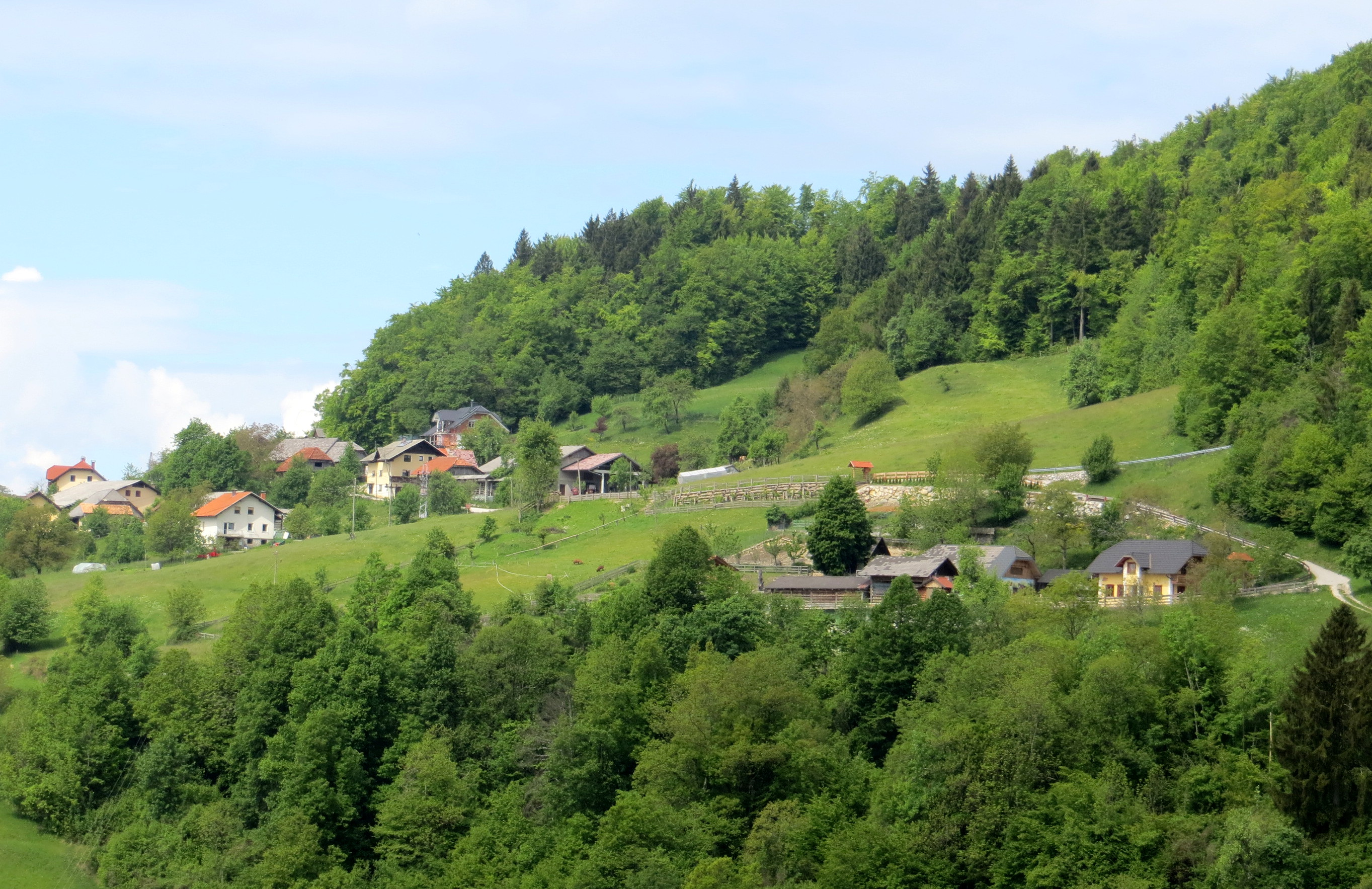

- Location in Slovenia
- Coordinates: 46°12′46.07″N 14°38′56.98″E
- Country: Slovenia
- Traditional region: Upper Carniola
- Statistical region: Central Slovenia
- Municipality: Kamnik

Area
  - Total: 1.99 km^{2} (0.77 sq mi)
- Elevation: 656.6 m (2,154 ft)

Population (2002)
  - Total: 32

Zgornje Palovče (pronounced [ˈzɡoːɾnjɛ ˈpaːlɔu̯tʃɛ]; in older sources also Zgornje Paloviče, German: Oberpalowitsch) is a settlement in the hills east of Kamnik in the Upper Carniola region of Slovenia.

A 350-year-old farmhouse in the settlement, known as the Budnar House, has been converted into a small museum. It has a shingled roof and much of the original furnishings, including a smoke kitchen and a prayer corner. Various exhibitions are periodically held in what used to be the barn.
