= Briše, Kamnik =

Briše
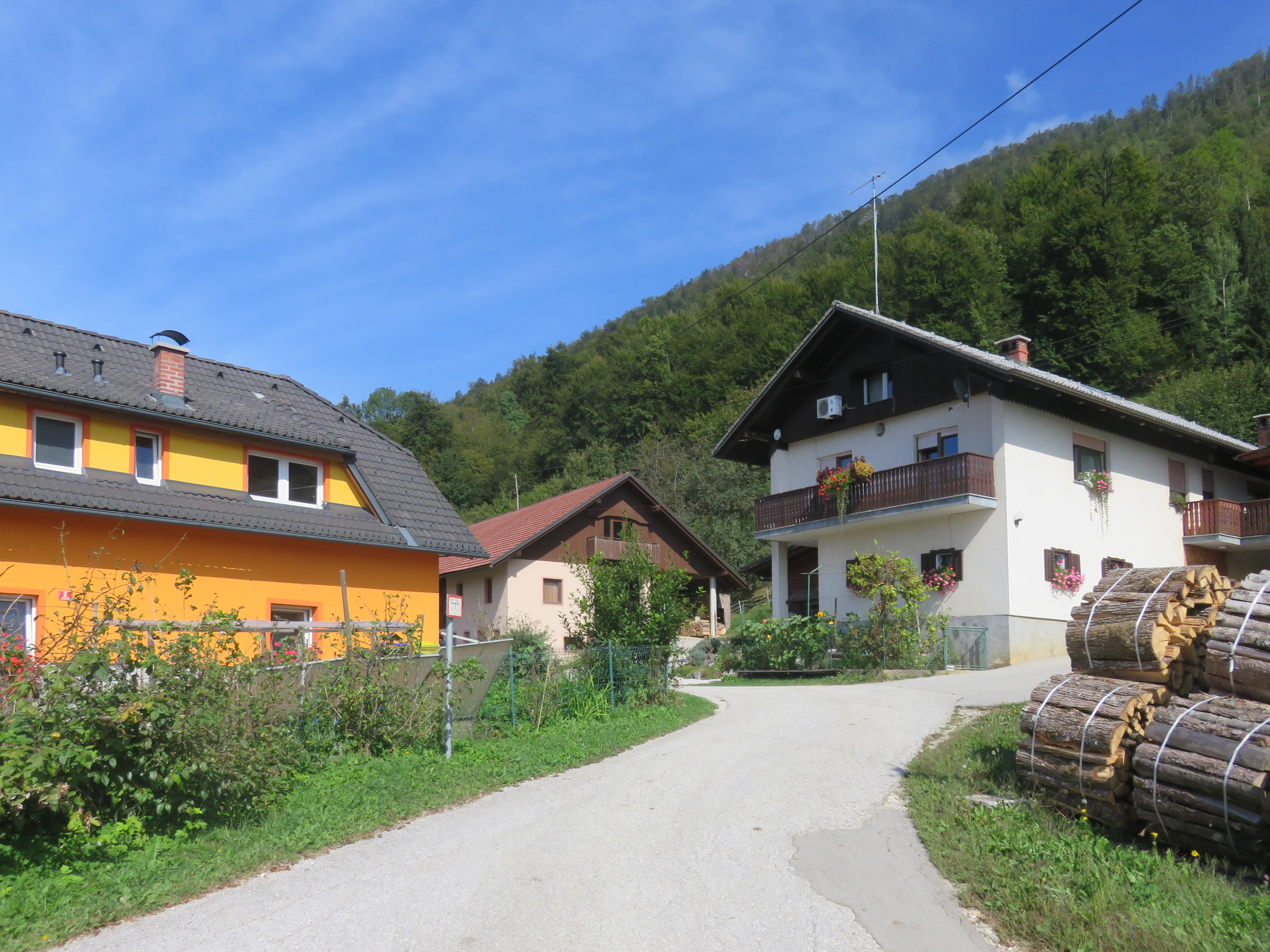

- Location in Slovenia
- Coordinates: 46°14′44.24″N 14°38′40.35″E
- Country: Slovenia
- Traditional region: Upper Carniola
- Statistical region: Central Slovenia
- Municipality: Kamnik
- Elevation: 517.6 m (1,698 ft)

Population (2002)
  - Total: 28

Briše (pronounced [ˈbɾiːʃɛ]) is a small settlement in the Municipality of Kamnik in the Upper Carniola region of Slovenia.
