= Markovo, Kamnik =

Markovo
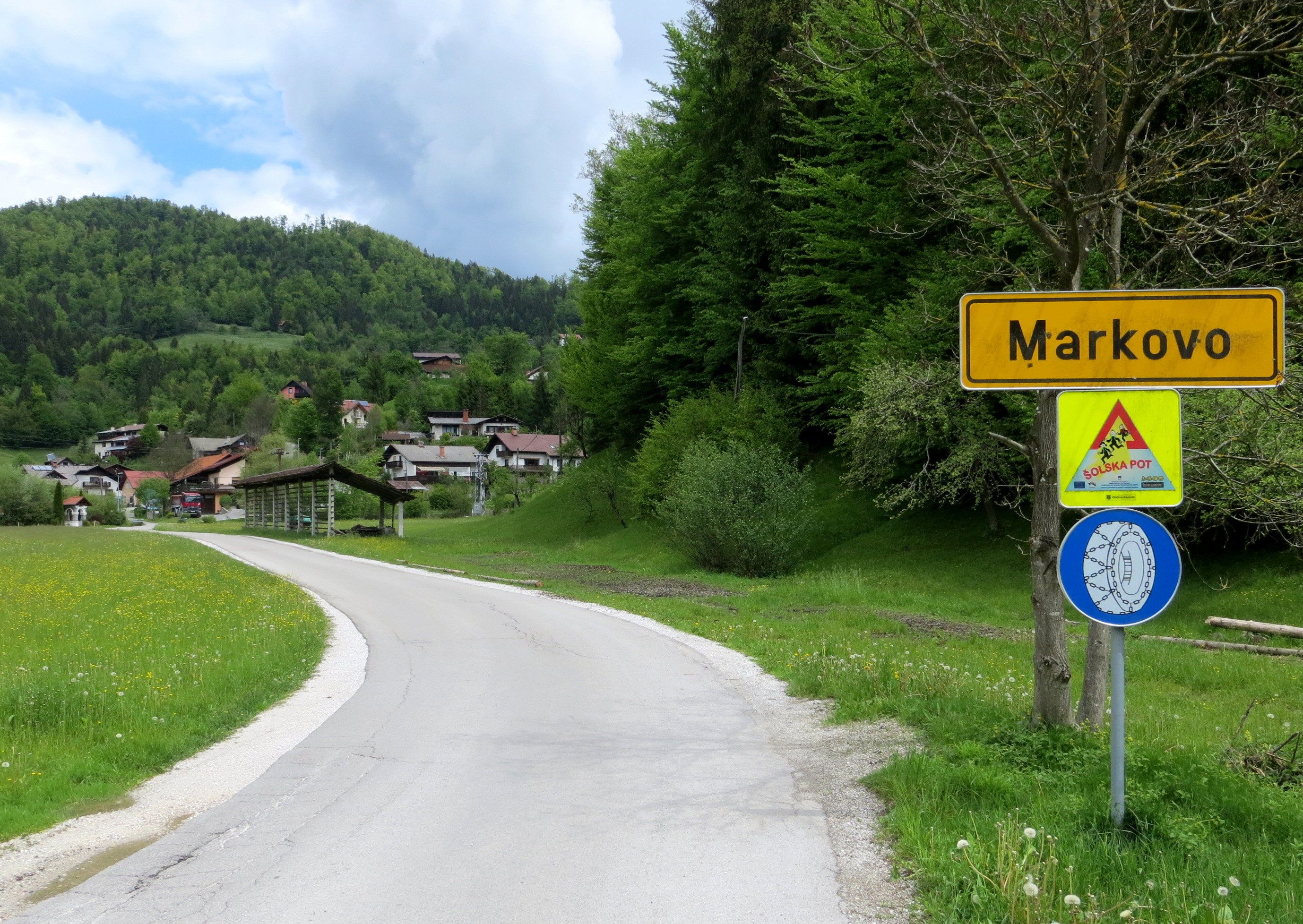

- Location in Slovenia
- Coordinates: 46°14′25.14″N 14°40′34.38″E
- Country: Slovenia
- Traditional region: Upper Carniola
- Statistical region: Central Slovenia
- Municipality: Kamnik

Area
  - Total: 1.01 km^{2} (0.39 sq mi)
- Elevation: 560.1 m (1,838 ft)

Population (2002)
  - Total: 174

Markovo (pronounced [ˈmaːɾkɔʋɔ]) is a small dispersed settlement in the Municipality of Kamnik in the Upper Carniola region of Slovenia.
