= Velika Lašna =

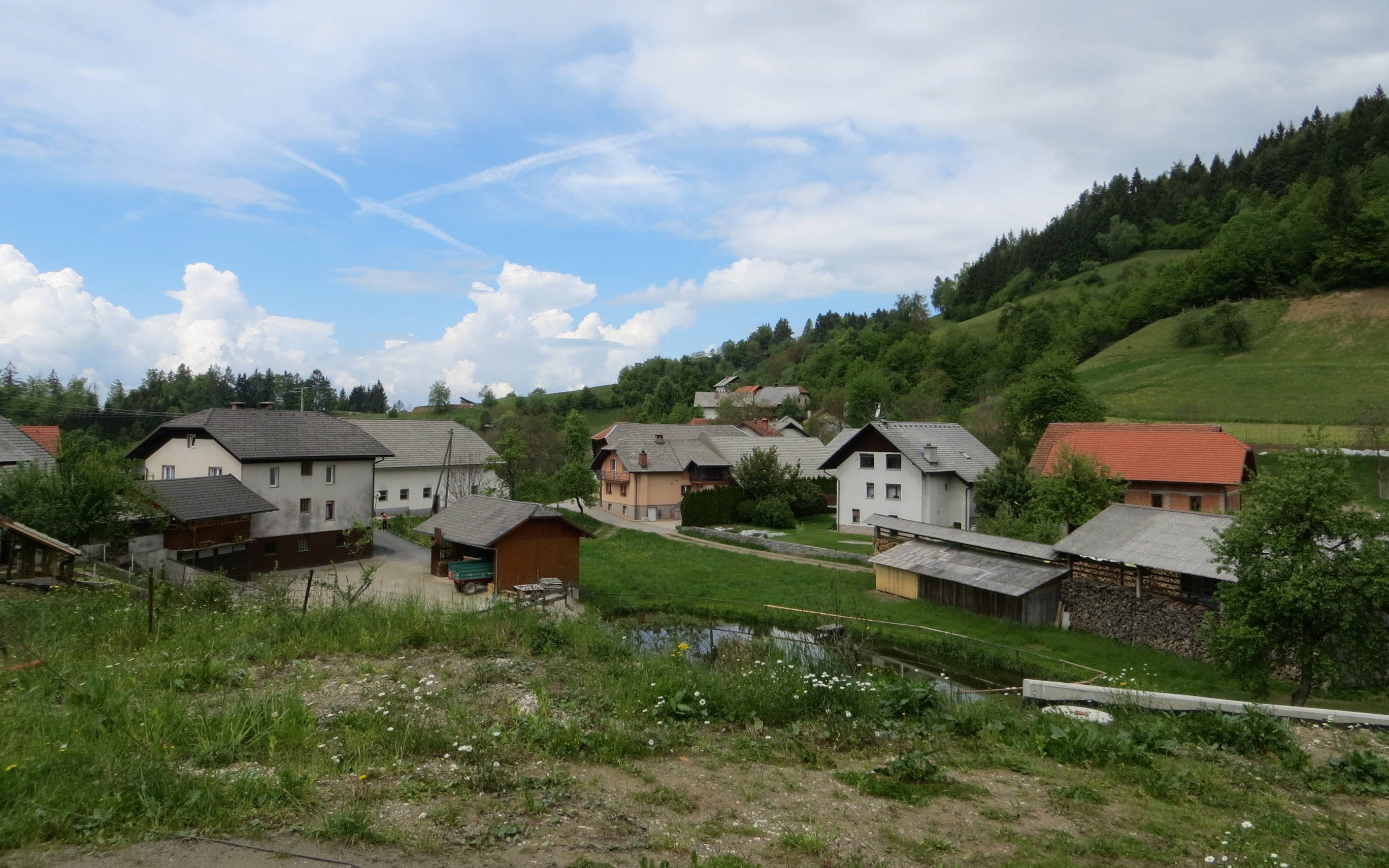

- Location in Slovenia
- Coordinates: 46°12′10.87″N 14°41′29.28″E
- Country: Slovenia
- Traditional region: Upper Carniola
- Statistical region: Central Slovenia
- Municipality: Kamnik

Area
  - Total: 3.88 km^{2} (1.50 sq mi)
- Elevation: 649.5 m (2,131 ft)

Population (2002)
  - Total: 102

Velika Lašna (pronounced [ˈʋeːlika ˈlaːʃna]; in older sources also Velika Lašina, German: Großlaschna) is a small village in the hills south of the Tuhinj Valley in the Upper Carniola region of Slovenia.
