= Kregarjevo =

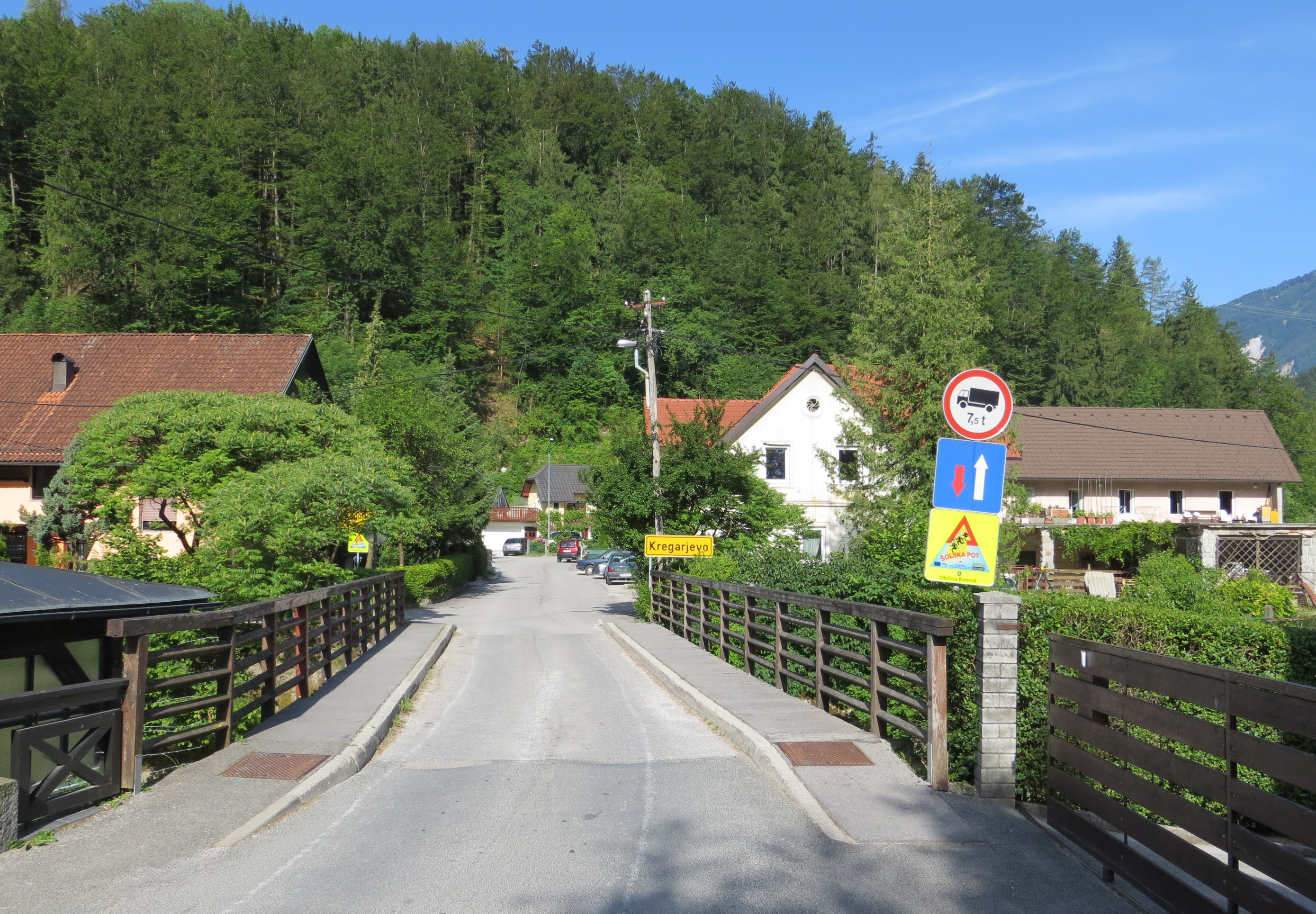

- Location in Slovenia
- Coordinates: 46°15′50.01″N 14°35′25.39″E
- Country: Slovenia
- Traditional region: Upper Carniola
- Statistical region: Central Slovenia
- Municipality: Kamnik
- Elevation: 494.1 m (1,621 ft)

Population (2002)
  - Total: 113

Kregarjevo (pronounced [ˈkɾeːɡaɾjɛʋɔ]) is a settlement on the right bank of the Kamnik Bistrica River in the Municipality of Kamnik in the Upper Carniola region of Slovenia.
