= Veliki Rakitovec =

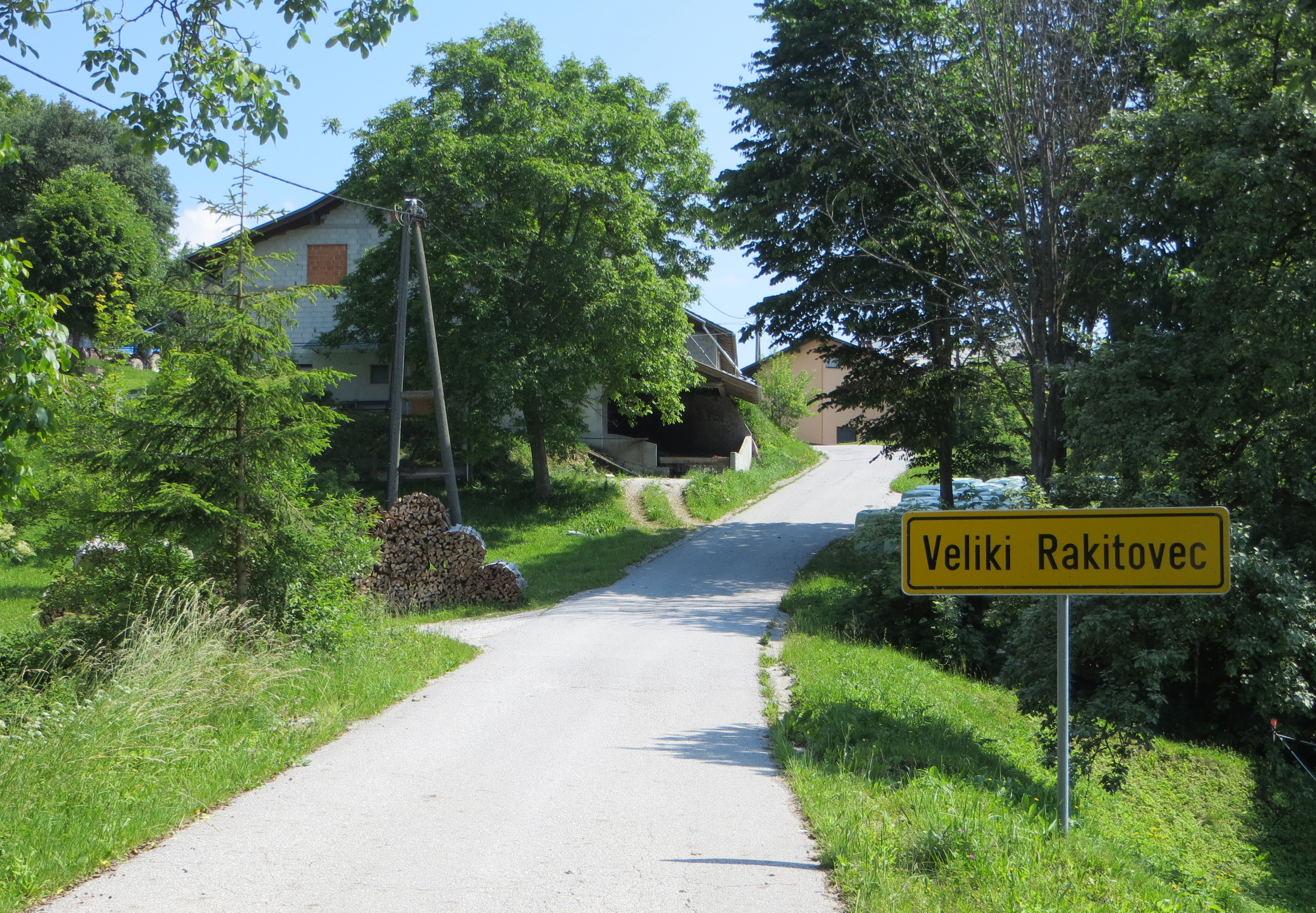

- Location in Slovenia
- Coordinates: 46°11′58.01″N 14°46′50.74″E
- Country: Slovenia
- Traditional region: Upper Carniola
- Statistical region: Central Slovenia
- Municipality: Kamnik

Area
  - Total: 1.67 km^{2} (0.64 sq mi)
- Elevation: 841.5 m (2,761 ft)

Population (2002)
  - Total: 24

Veliki Rakitovec (pronounced [ˈʋeːliki ɾaˈkiːtɔʋəts]; German: Großrakitowitz) is a small settlement of a few farms in the hills south of the Tuhinj Valley in the Municipality of Kamnik in the Upper Carniola region of Slovenia.
