= Mali Hrib =

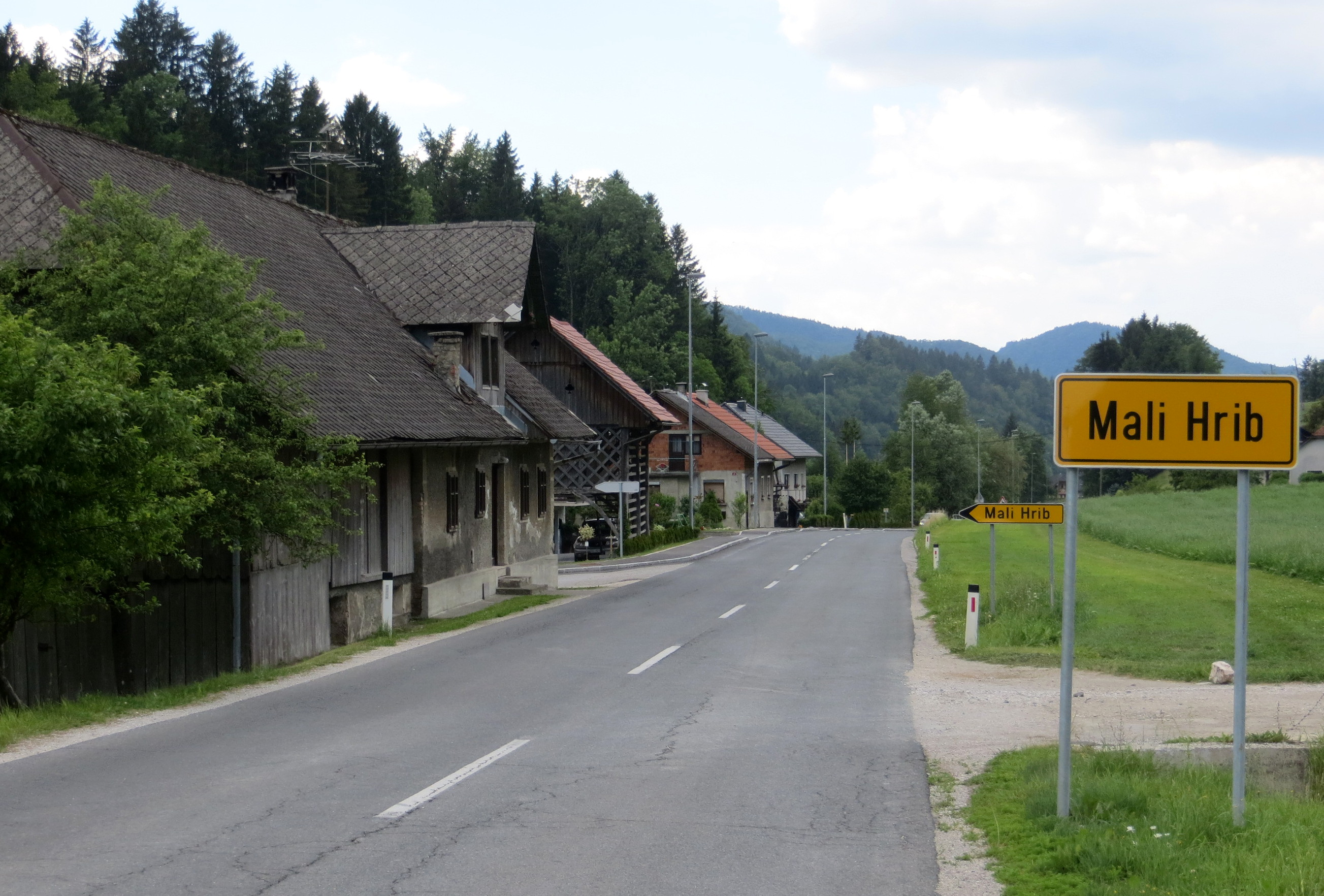

- Location in Slovenia
- Coordinates: 46°12′58.83″N 14°46′15.97″E
- Country: Slovenia
- Traditional region: Upper Carniola
- Statistical region: Central Slovenia
- Municipality: Kamnik

Area
  - Total: 0.95 km^{2} (0.37 sq mi)
- Elevation: 600 m (2,000 ft)

Population (2002)
  - Total: 71

Mali Hrib (pronounced [ˈmaːli ˈxɾiːp]; German: Kleinhrib) is a small settlement in the Municipality of Kamnik in the Upper Carniola region of Slovenia.
