= Studenca, Slovenia =

Studenca
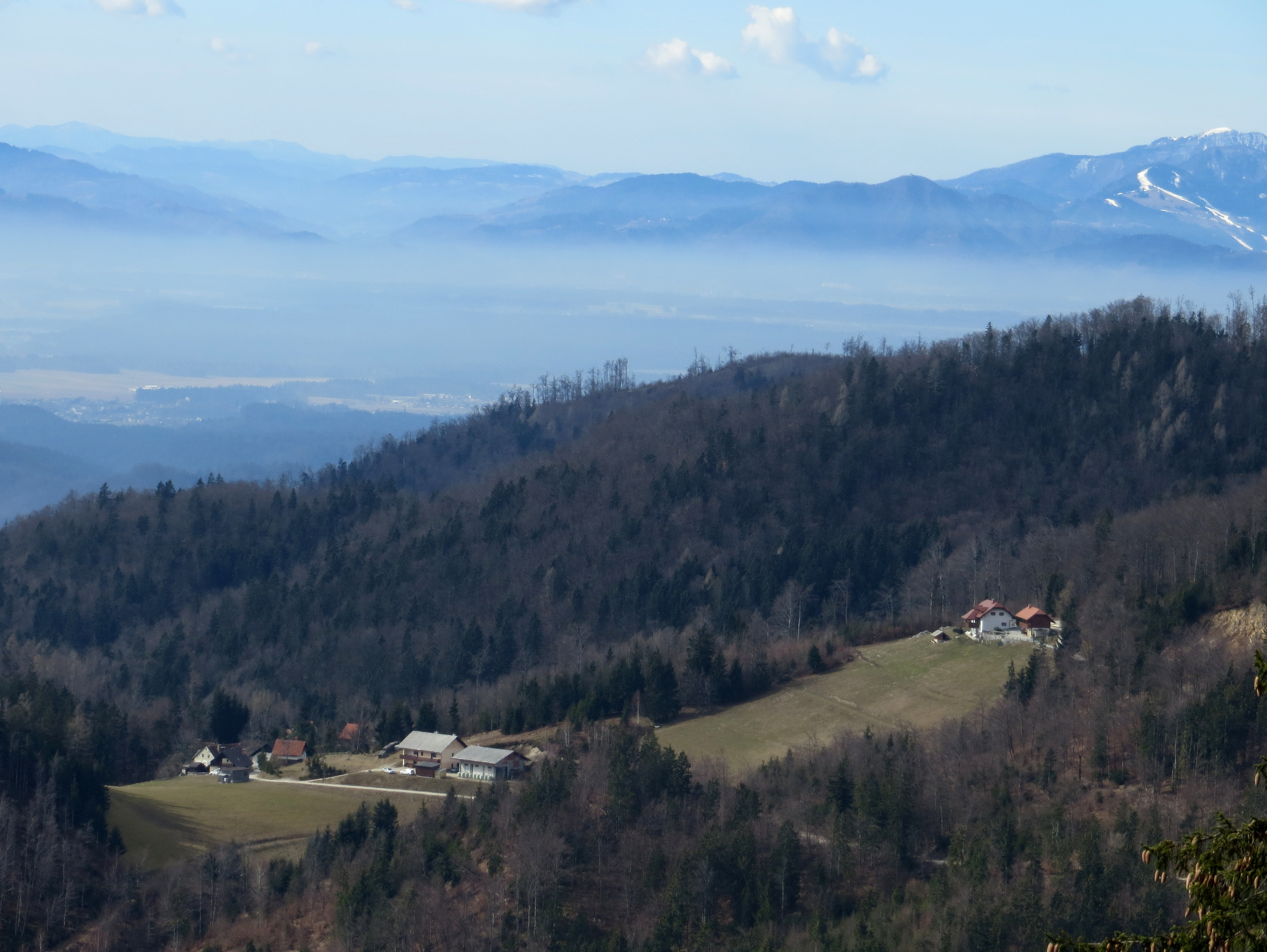
- The hamlet of Zabreznik in Studenca

- Location in Slovenia
- Coordinates: 46°14′47.2″N 14°40′45.92″E
- Country: Slovenia
- Traditional region: Upper Carniola
- Statistical region: Central Slovenia
- Municipality: Kamnik

Area
  - Total: 1.64 km^{2} (0.63 sq mi)
- Elevation: 690.6 m (2,266 ft)

Population (2002)
  - Total: 67

Studenca (pronounced [stuˈdɛːntsa]; in older sources also Studenec, German: Studenz) is a small dispersed settlement in the hills northeast of Kamnik in the Upper Carniola region of Slovenia. It includes the hamlets of Spodnja Studenca (German: Unterstudenz), Zgornja Studenca (German: Oberstudenz), and Zabreznik.
