= Golice, Kamnik =

Golice
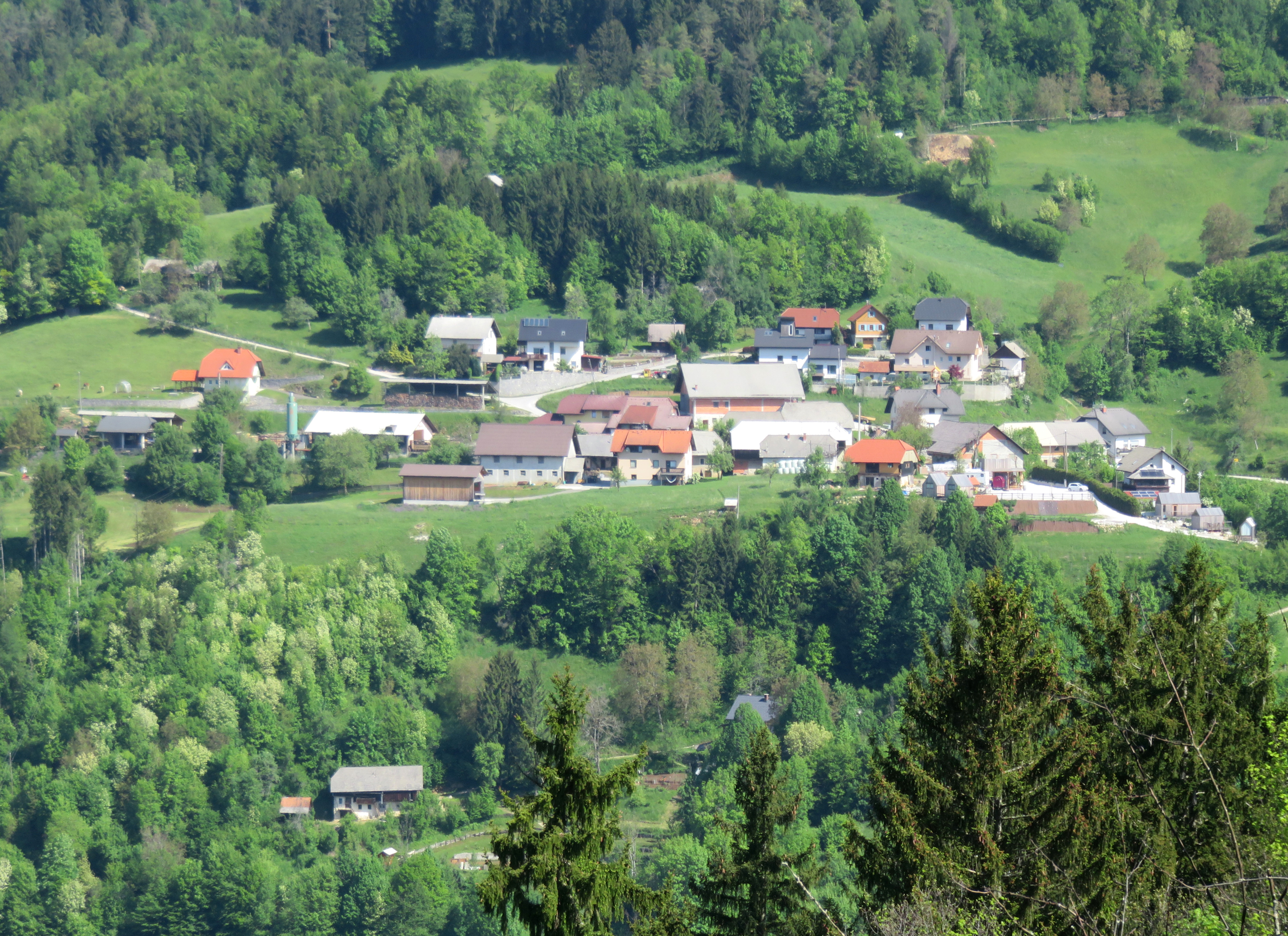

- Location in Slovenia
- Coordinates: 46°13′21.31″N 14°47′23.08″E
- Country: Slovenia
- Traditional region: Upper Carniola
- Statistical region: Central Slovenia
- Municipality: Kamnik
- Elevation: 645.1 m (2,116 ft)

Population (2002)
  - Total: 102

Golice (pronounced [ɡɔˈliːtsɛ]) is a small settlement in the Municipality of Kamnik in the Upper Carniola region of Slovenia.
