= Žubejevo =

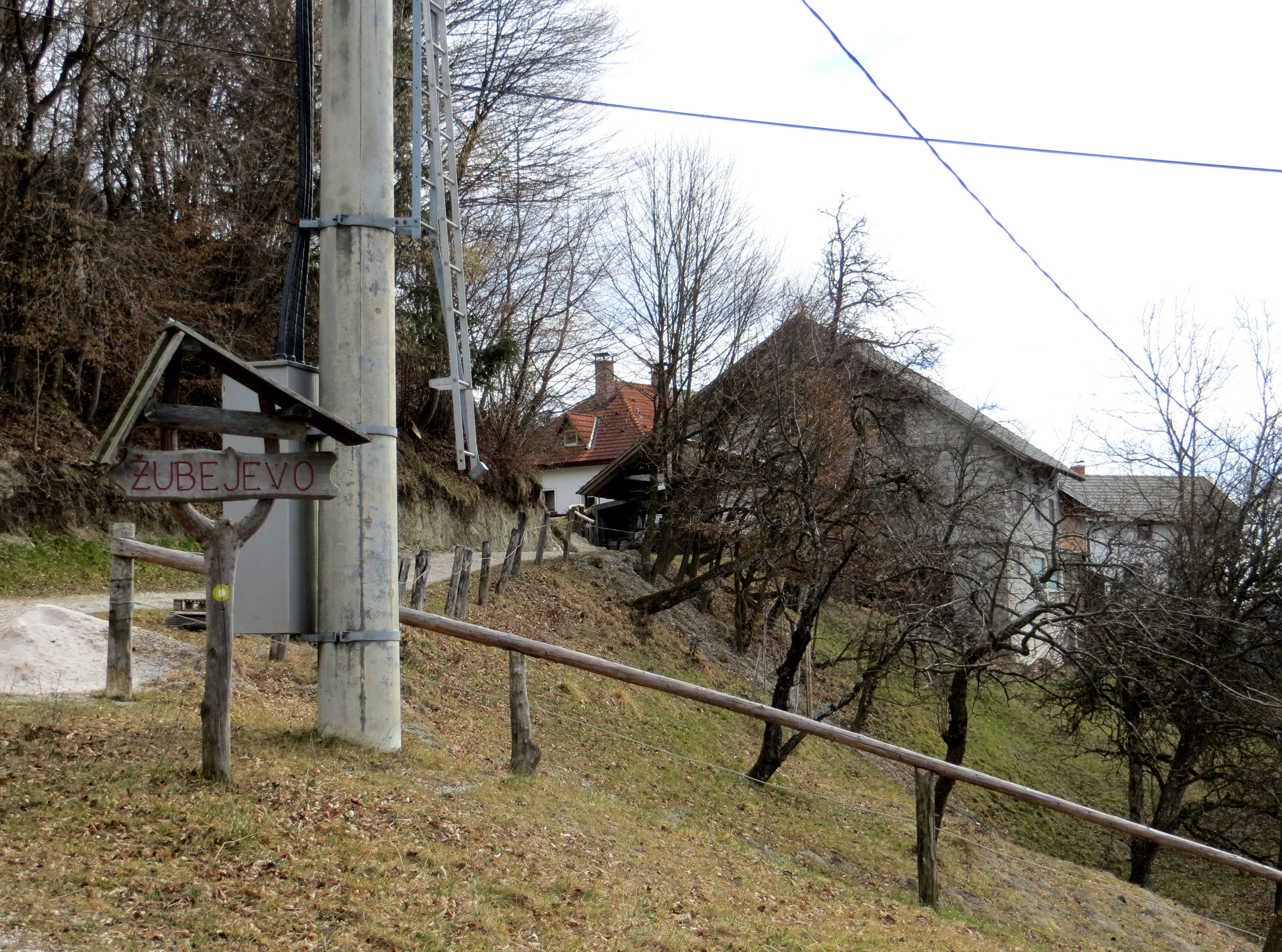

- Location in Slovenia
- Coordinates: 46°14′19.55″N 14°42′1.24″E
- Country: Slovenia
- Traditional region: Upper Carniola
- Statistical region: Central Slovenia
- Municipality: Kamnik

Area
  - Total: 0.70 km^{2} (0.27 sq mi)
- Elevation: 652.8 m (2,142 ft)

Population (2002)
  - Total: 28

Žubejevo (pronounced [ʒuˈbɛːjɛʋɔ] or [-ˈbeː-]) is a small dispersed settlement above the Tuhinj Valley in the Municipality of Kamnik in the Upper Carniola region of Slovenia.
