= Češnjice v Tuhinju =

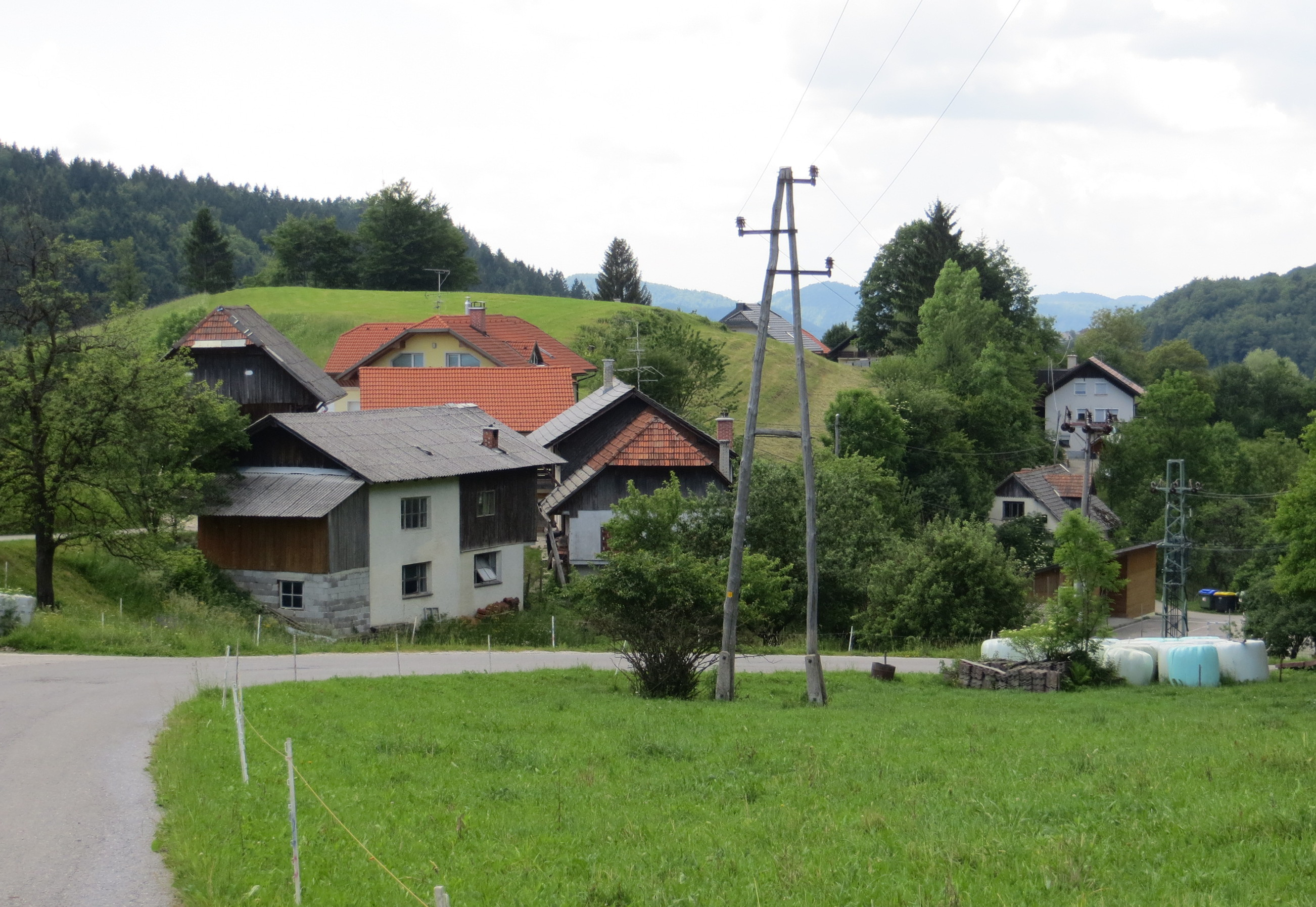

- Location in Slovenia
- Coordinates: 46°13′20.21″N 14°48′53.12″E
- Country: Slovenia
- Traditional region: Upper Carniola
- Statistical region: Central Slovenia
- Municipality: Kamnik
- Elevation: 673.6 m (2,210 ft)

Population (2002)
  - Total: 117

Češnjice v Tuhinju (pronounced [ˈtʃeːʃnitsɛ ʍ tuˈxiːnju]; German: Kerschdorf or Kerschstetten) is a village in the Tuhinj Valley in the Municipality of Kamnik in the Upper Carniola region of Slovenia.

== Name ==
The name of the settlement was changed from Češnjice to Češnjice v Tuhinju in 1953. In the past the German name was Kerschdorf or Kerschstetten.
