= Trebelno pri Palovčah =

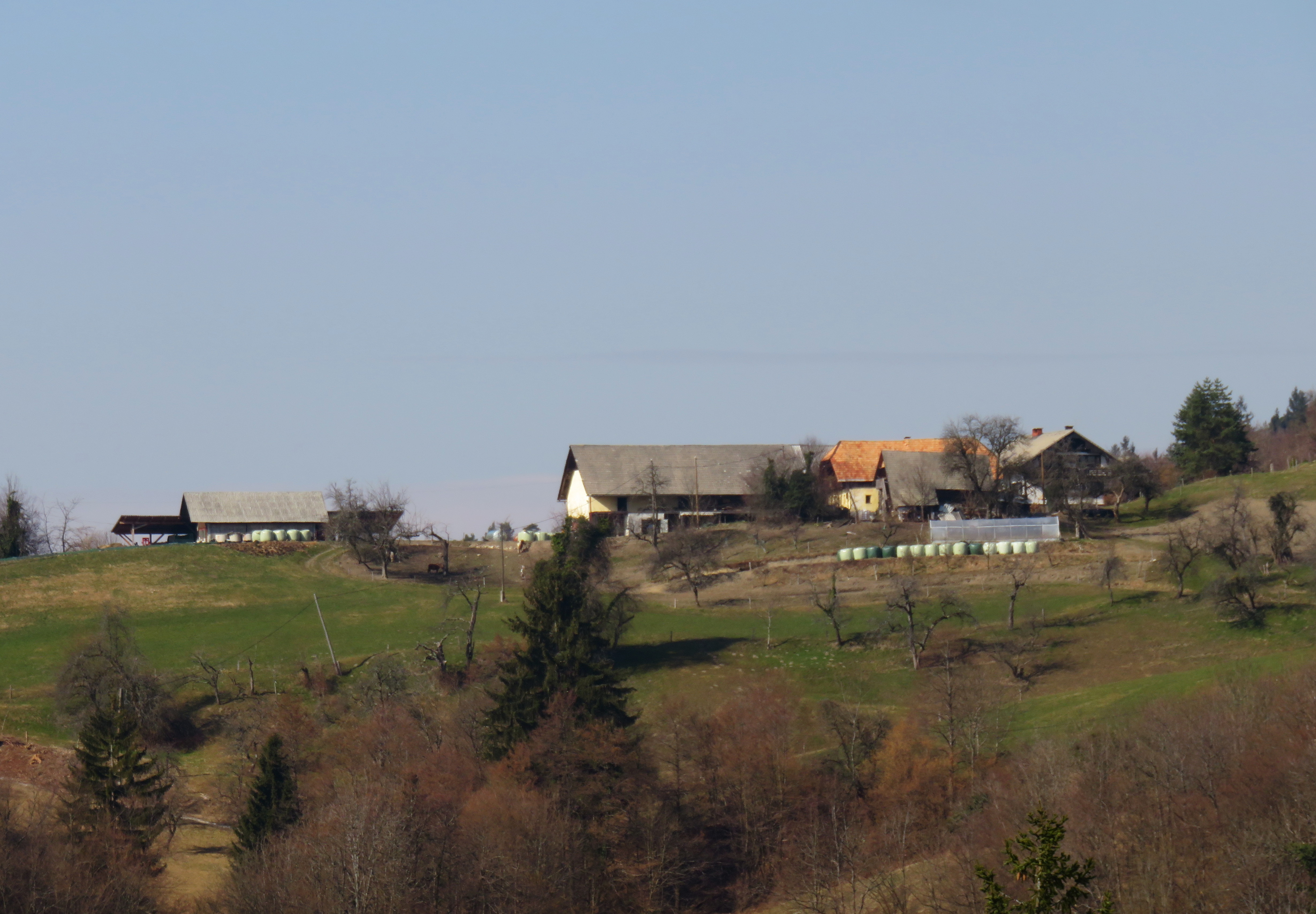

- Location in Slovenia
- Coordinates: 46°12′34.75″N 14°39′4.98″E
- Country: Slovenia
- Traditional region: Upper Carniola
- Statistical region: Central Slovenia
- Municipality: Kamnik

Area
  - Total: 0.34 km^{2} (0.13 sq mi)
- Elevation: 545.6 m (1,790 ft)

Population (2002)
  - Total: 9

Trebelno pri Palovčah (pronounced [tɾɛˈbéːwnɔ pɾi ˈpaːlɔwtʃax]) is a small settlement, little more than a group of three dispersed farmsteads, in the hills east of Kamnik in the Upper Carniola region of Slovenia.

== Name ==
The name of the settlement was changed from Trebelno to Trebelno pri Palovčah in 1952.
