= Podbreg, Kamnik =

Podbreg
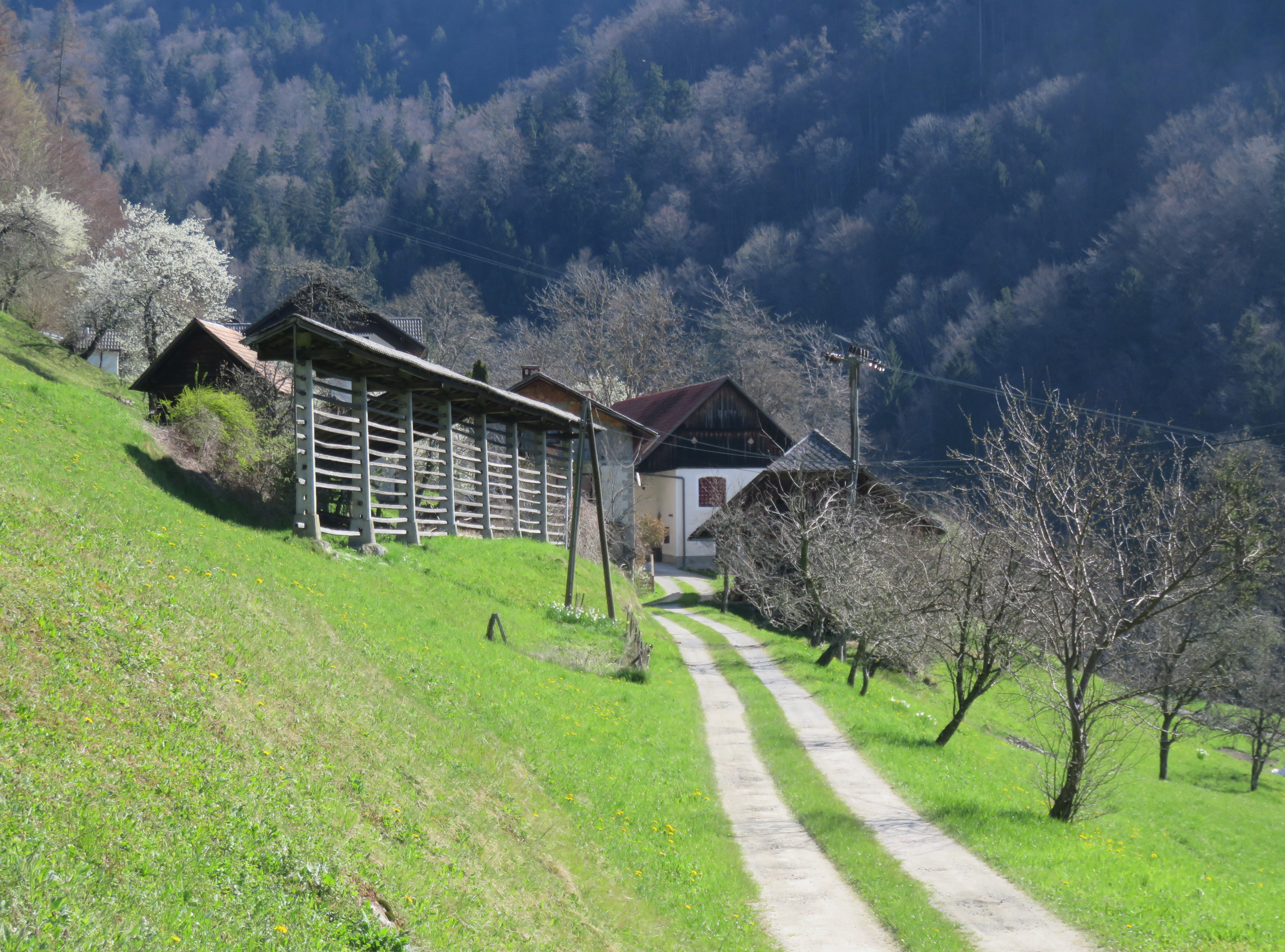

- Location in Slovenia
- Coordinates: 46°14′7.47″N 14°43′31.39″E
- Country: Slovenia
- Traditional region: Upper Carniola
- Statistical region: Central Slovenia
- Municipality: Kamnik

Area
  - Total: 0.2 km^{2} (0.077 sq mi)
- Elevation: 579.9 m (1,903 ft)

Population (2002)
  - Total: 13

Podbreg (pronounced [pɔdˈbɾeːk]) is a small settlement above the Tuhinj Valley in the Municipality of Kamnik in the Upper Carniola region of Slovenia.
