= Potok v Črni =

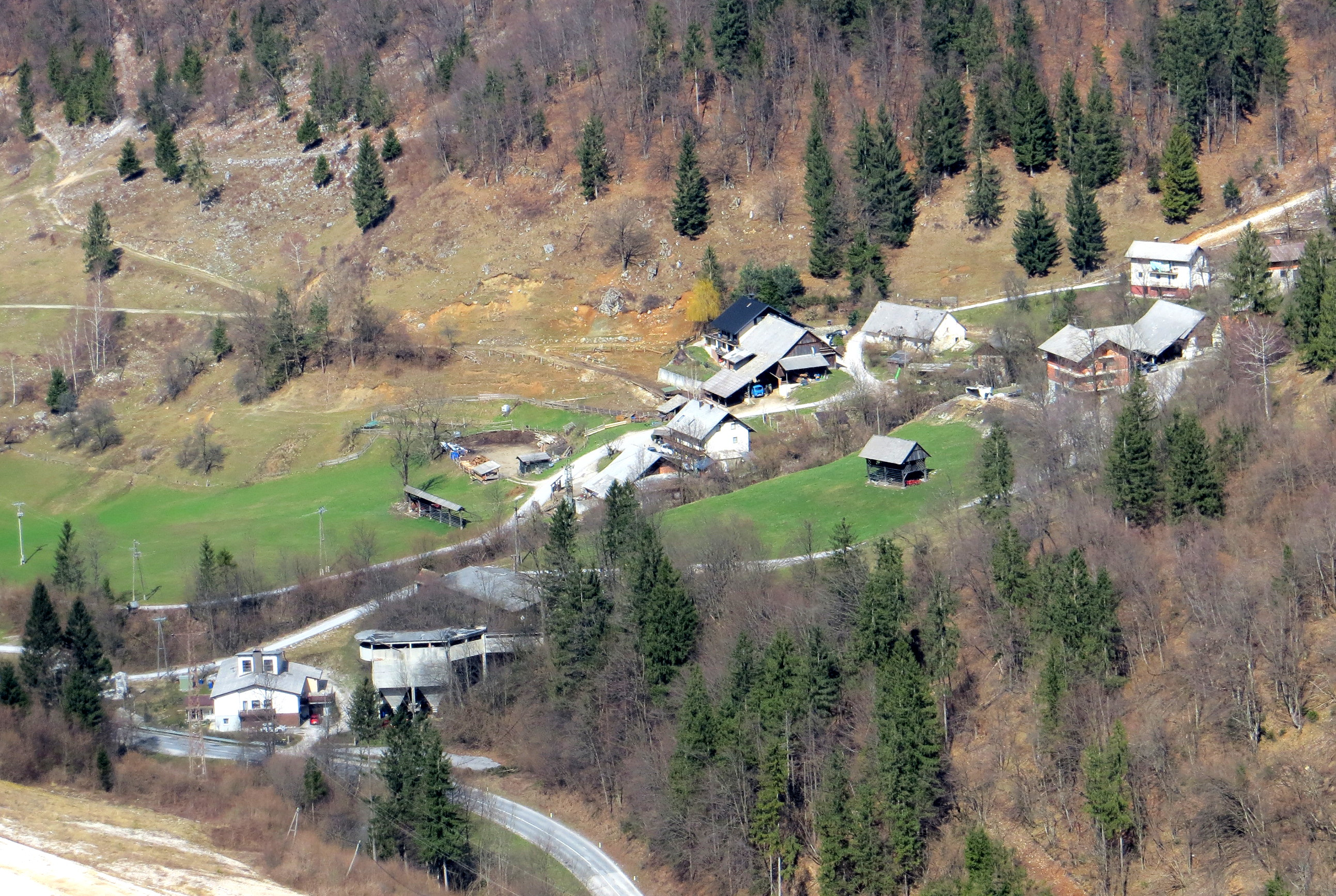

- Location in Slovenia
- Coordinates: 46°15′54.77″N 14°38′15.15″E
- Country: Slovenia
- Traditional region: Upper Carniola
- Statistical region: Central Slovenia
- Municipality: Kamnik

Area
  - Total: 1.69 km^{2} (0.65 sq mi)
- Elevation: 543.5 m (1,783 ft)

Population (2002)
  - Total: 38

Potok v Črni (pronounced [ˈpɔːtɔk ʍ ˈtʃəɾni]) is a small dispersed settlement on Black Creek (Slovene: Črna), a tributary of the Kamnik Bistrica River, in the Municipality of Kamnik in the Upper Carniola region of Slovenia.
