= Klemenčevo =

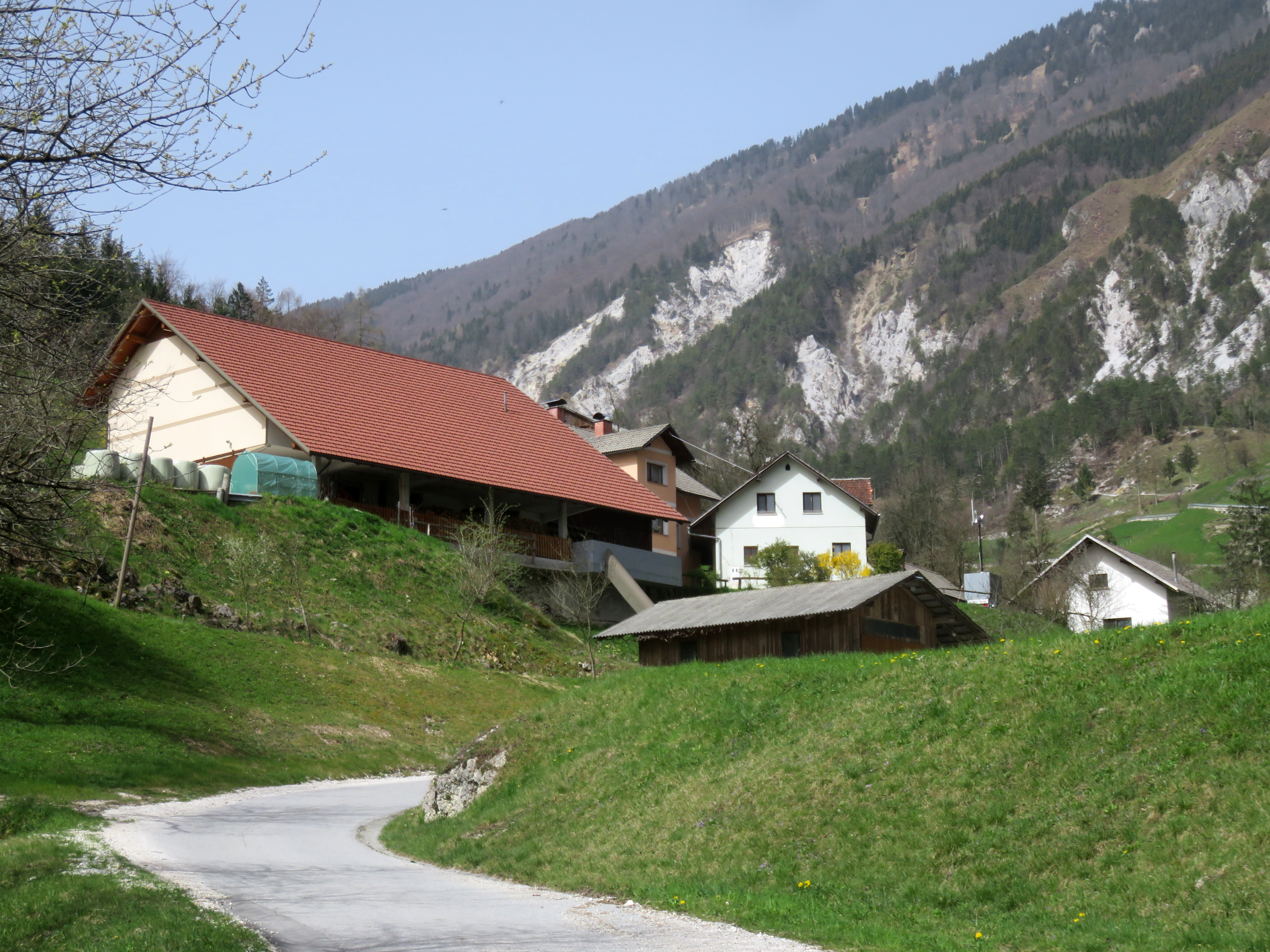

- Location in Slovenia
- Coordinates: 46°16′35.66″N 14°33′57.03″E
- Country: Slovenia
- Traditional region: Upper Carniola
- Statistical region: Central Slovenia
- Municipality: Kamnik
- Elevation: 609.9 m (2,001 ft)

Population (2002)
  - Total: 14

Klemenčevo (pronounced [klɛˈmeːntʃɛʋɔ]) is a small dispersed settlement in the Kamnik Alps in the Municipality of Kamnik in the Upper Carniola region of Slovenia.
