= Laseno =

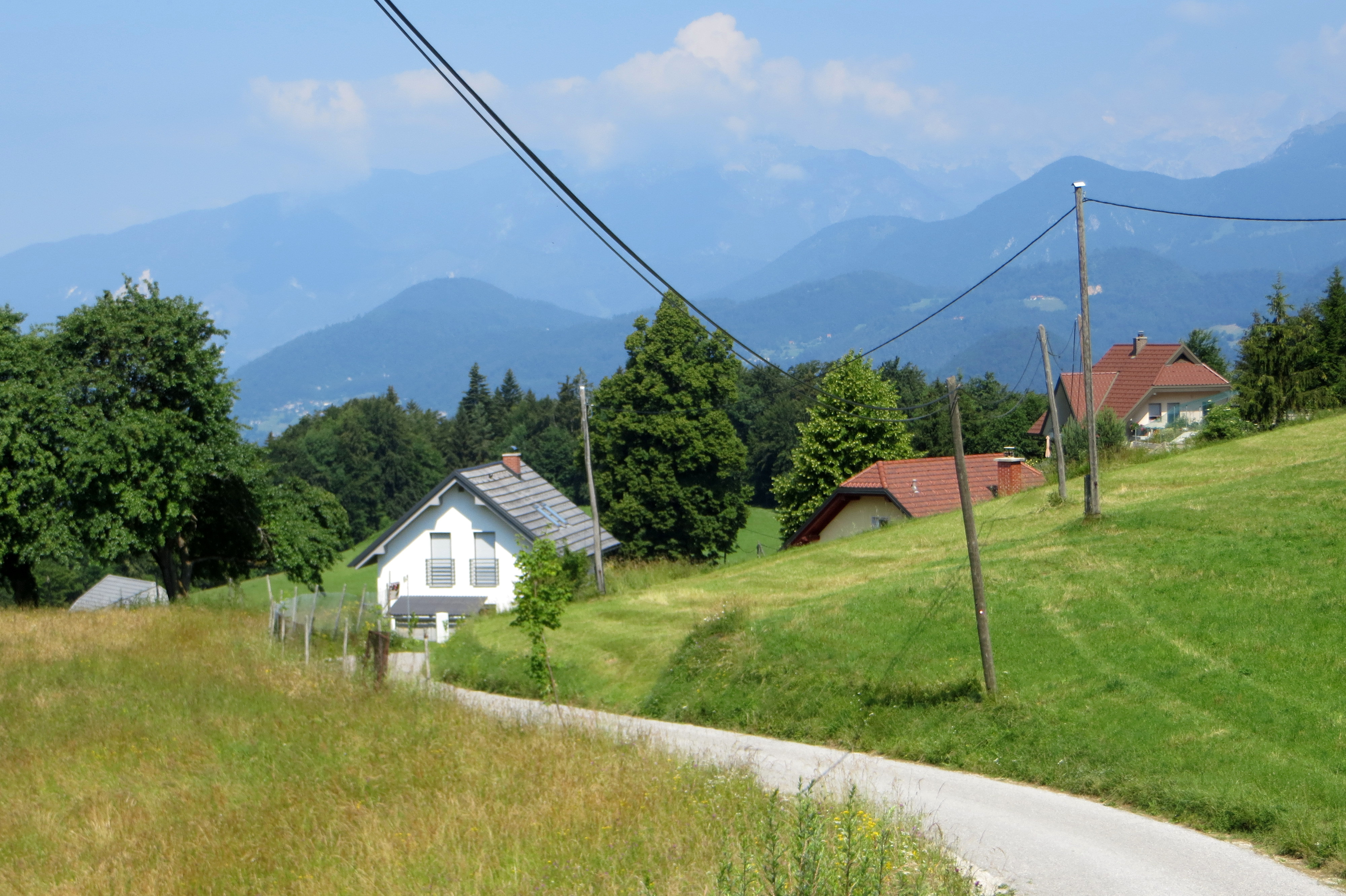

- Location in Slovenia
- Coordinates: 46°12′4.32″N 14°45′26.75″E
- Country: Slovenia
- Traditional region: Upper Carniola
- Statistical region: Central Slovenia
- Municipality: Kamnik

Area
  - Total: 1.07 km^{2} (0.41 sq mi)
- Elevation: 748.3 m (2,455 ft)

Population (2002)
  - Total: 5

Laseno (pronounced [laˈseːnɔ]) is a small dispersed settlement in the Municipality of Kamnik in the Upper Carniola region of Slovenia.
