= Kršič =

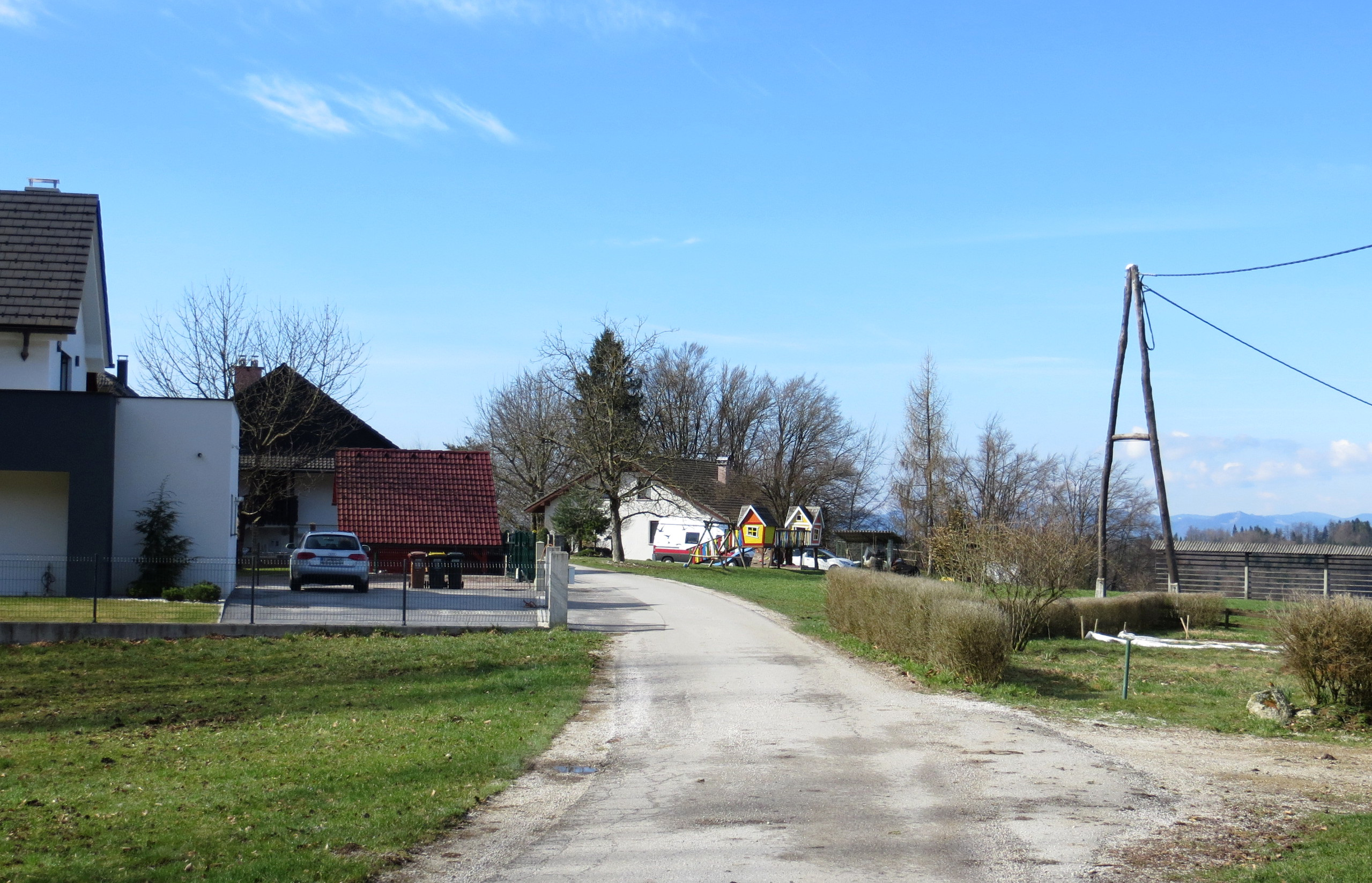

- Location in Slovenia
- Coordinates: 46°15′9.16″N 14°36′51.85″E
- Country: Slovenia
- Traditional region: Upper Carniola
- Statistical region: Central Slovenia
- Municipality: Kamnik
- Elevation: 473.9 m (1,555 ft)

Population (2002)
  - Total: 21

Kršič (pronounced [kəɾˈʃitʃ]) is a small settlement above Godič in the Municipality of Kamnik in the Upper Carniola region of Slovenia.
