= Municipality of Kamnik =

Municipality of Slovenia

Municipality of Kamnik Občina Kamnik
- Municipality
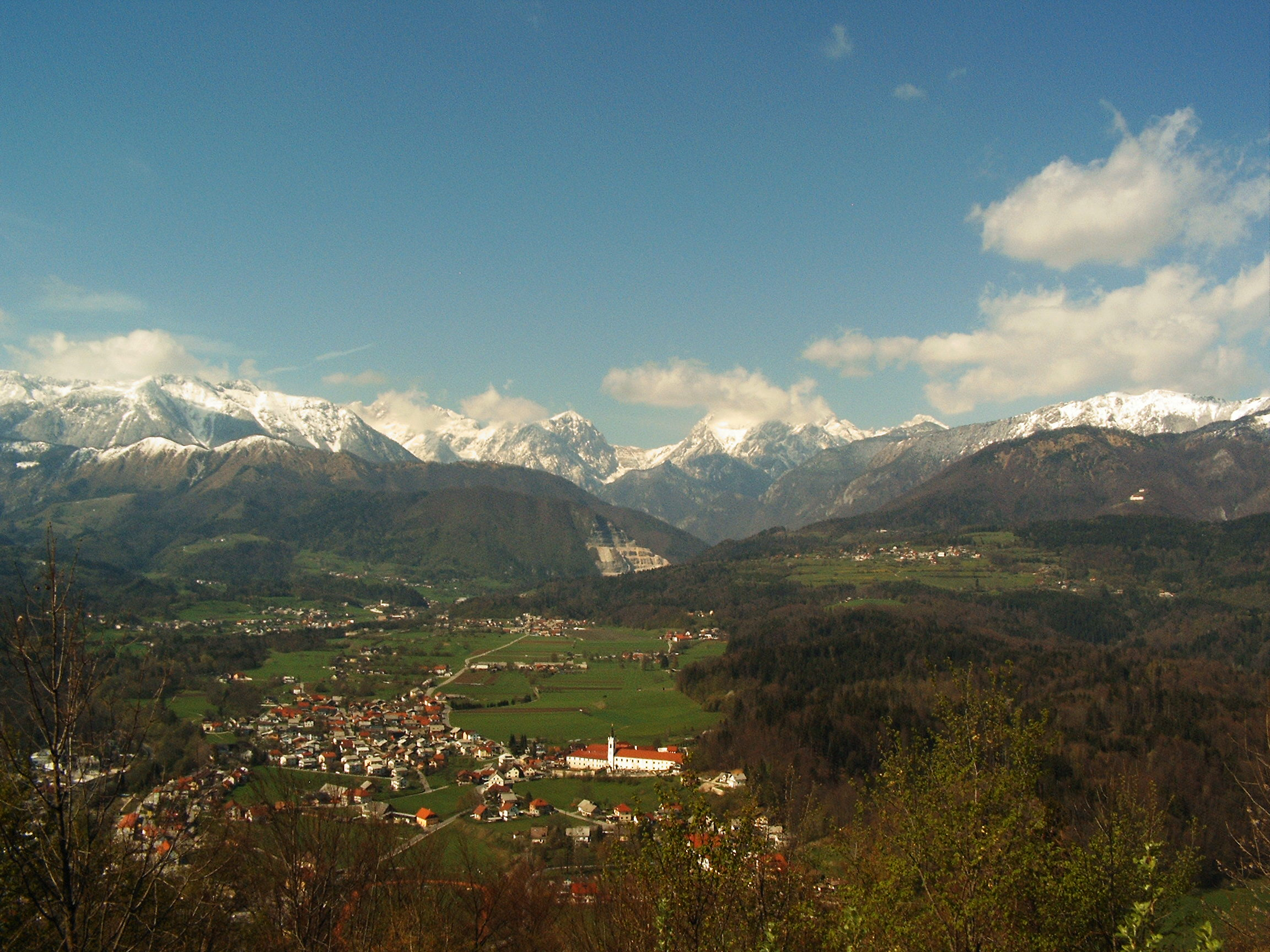

- Coat of arms

- Location of the Municipality of Kamnik in Slovenia
- Coordinates: 46°13′30″N 14°37′00″E
- Country: Slovenia

Government
  - Mayor: Matej Slapar (Independent)

Area
  - Total: 266 km^{2} (103 sq mi)

Population (2012)
  - Total: 28,999
  - Density: 109/km^{2} (282/sq mi)
- Time zone: UTC+01 (CET)
  - Summer (DST): UTC+02 (CEST)
- Website: www.kamnik.si

The Municipality of Kamnik (pronounced [ˈkaːmnik]; Slovene: Občina Kamnik) is a municipality in northern Slovenia. The seat of the municipality is the town of Kamnik. Today it is part of the Central Slovenia Statistical Region. It is the 15th-largest municipality by area in Slovenia.

== Settlements ==
In addition to the municipal seat of Kamnik, the municipality also includes the following settlements:

- Bela
- Bela Peč
- Bistričica
- Brezje nad Kamnikom
- Briše
- Buč
- Češnjice v Tuhinju
- Cirkuše v Tuhinju
- Črna pri Kamniku
- Črni Vrh v Tuhinju
- Gabrovnica
- Godič
- Golice
- Gozd
- Gradišče v Tuhinju
- Hrib pri Kamniku
- Hruševka
- Jeranovo
- Kališe
- Kamniška Bistrica
- Klemenčevo
- Kostanj
- Košiše
- Kregarjevo
- Krivčevo
- Kršič
- Laniše
- Laseno
- Laze v Tuhinju
- Liplje
- Loke v Tuhinju
- Mali Hrib
- Mali Rakitovec
- Markovo
- Mekinje
- Motnik
- Nevlje
- Okrog pri Motniku
- Okroglo
- Oševek
- Pirševo
- Podbreg
- Podgorje
- Podhruška
- Podjelše
- Podlom
- Podstudenec
- Poljana
- Poreber
- Potok
- Potok v Črni
- Praproče v Tuhinju
- Pšajnovica
- Ravne pri Šmartnem
- Rožično
- Rudnik pri Radomljah
- Sela pri Kamniku
- Sidol
- Šmarca
- Šmartno v Tuhinju
- Smrečje v Črni
- Snovik
- Soteska
- Sovinja Peč
- Špitalič
- Spodnje Palovče
- Spodnje Stranje
- Srednja Vas pri Kamniku
- Stahovica
- Stara Sela
- Stebljevek
- Stolnik
- Studenca
- Trebelno pri Palovčah
- Trobelno
- Tučna
- Tunjice
- Tunjiška Mlaka
- Vaseno
- Velika Lašna
- Velika Planina
- Veliki Hrib
- Veliki Rakitovec
- Vir pri Nevljah
- Vodice nad Kamnikom
- Volčji Potok
- Vranja Peč
- Vrhpolje pri Kamniku
- Žaga
- Zagorica nad Kamnikom
- Zajasovnik
- Zakal
- Zavrh pri Črnivcu
- Zduša
- Zgornje Palovče
- Zgornje Stranje
- Zgornji Motnik
- Zgornji Tuhinj
- Znojile
- Žubejevo
- Županje Njive
