= Okroglo, Kamnik =

Okroglo
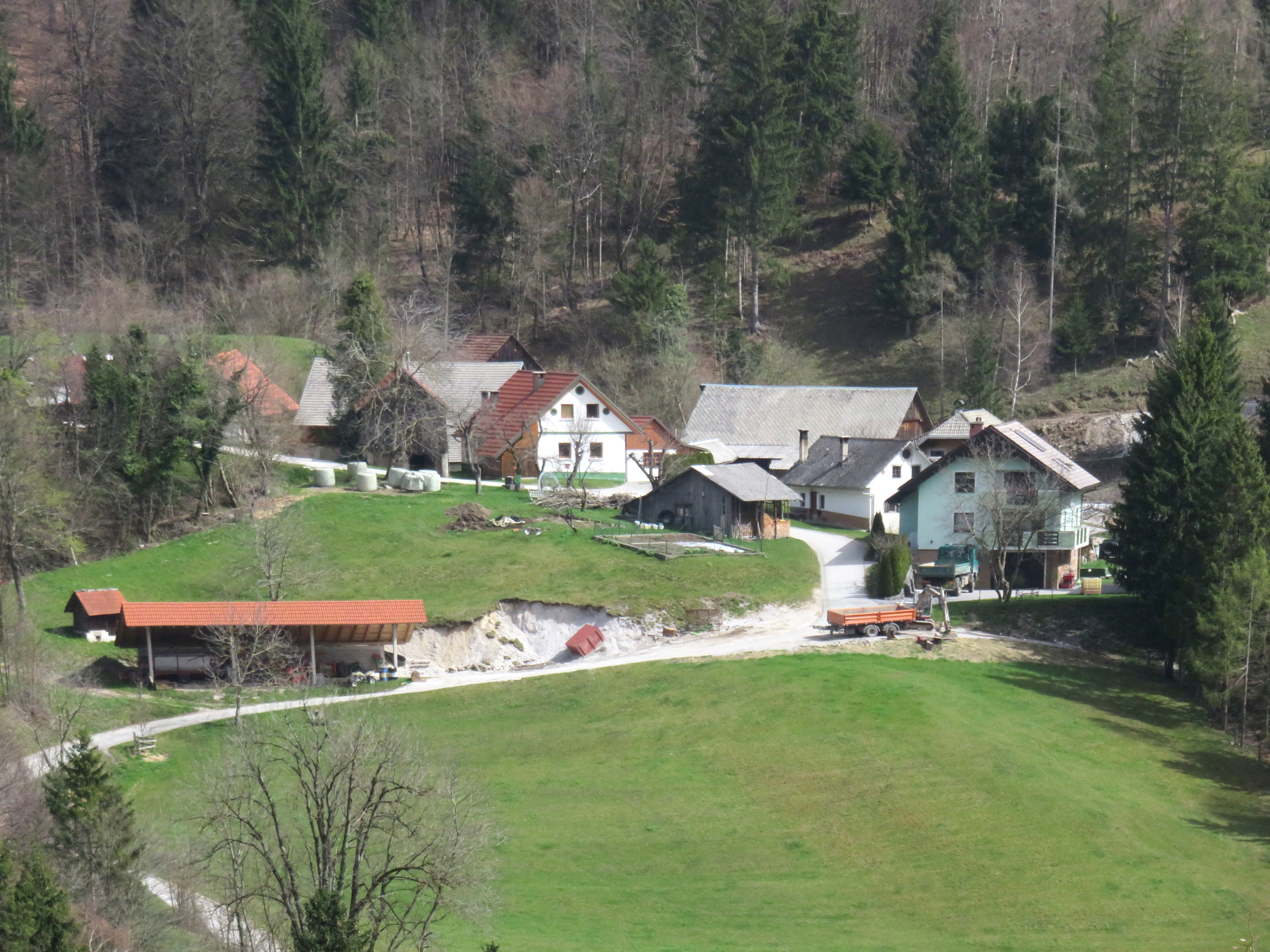

- Location in Slovenia
- Coordinates: 46°16′19.1″N 14°35′12.36″E
- Country: Slovenia
- Traditional region: Upper Carniola
- Statistical region: Central Slovenia
- Municipality: Kamnik

Area
  - Total: 1.43 km^{2} (0.55 sq mi)
- Elevation: 644.7 m (2,115 ft)

Population (2002)
  - Total: 50

Okroglo (pronounced [ɔˈkɾoːɡlɔ]) is a small settlement in the Municipality of Kamnik in the Upper Carniola region of Slovenia.
