= Košiše =

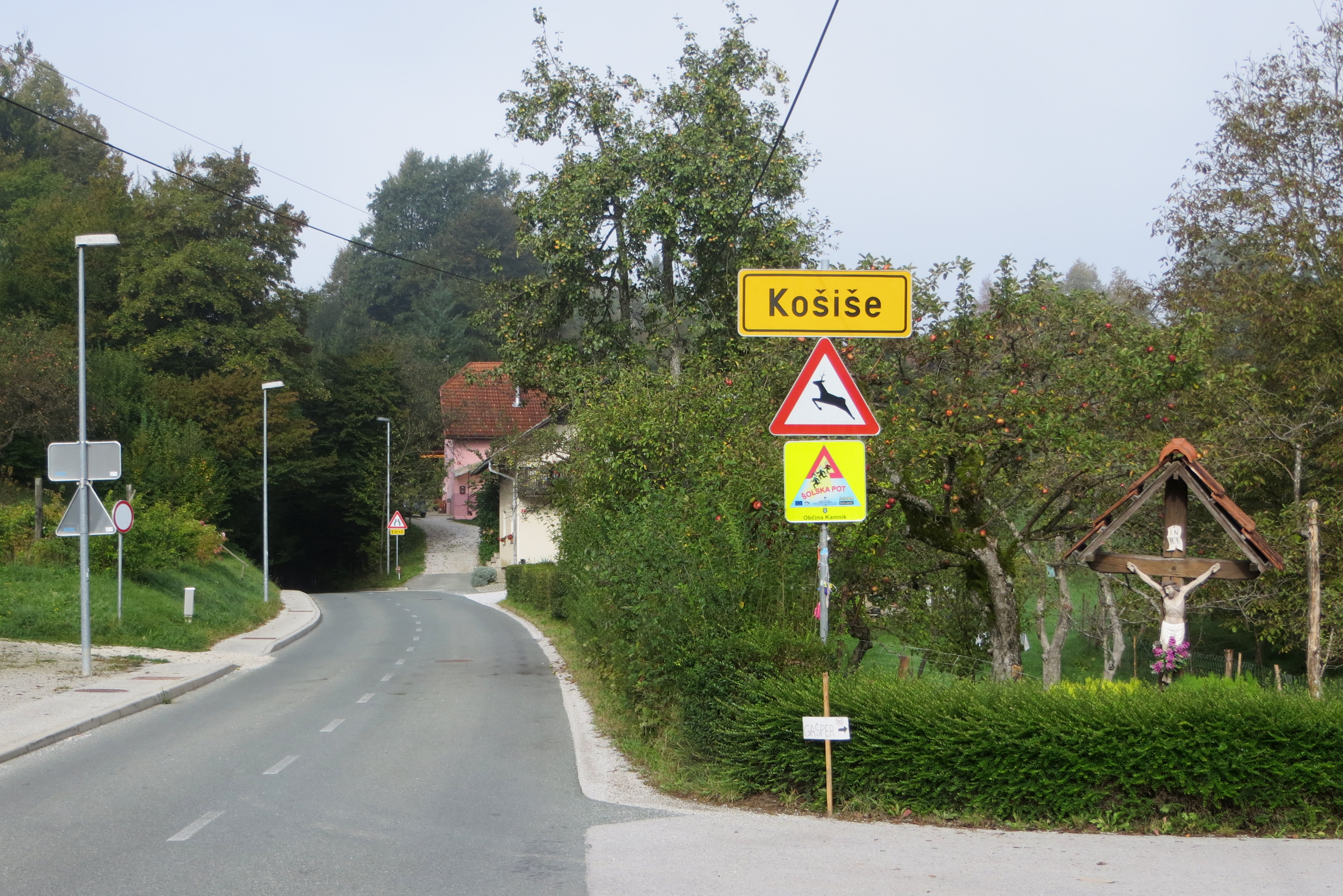

- Location in Slovenia
- Coordinates: 46°14′31.29″N 14°35′28.57″E
- Country: Slovenia
- Traditional region: Upper Carniola
- Statistical region: Central Slovenia
- Municipality: Kamnik
- Elevation: 430.4 m (1,412 ft)

Population (2002)
  - Total: 156

Košiše (pronounced [kɔˈʃiːʃɛ]; German: Koschische) is a small dispersed settlement above Mekinje in the Municipality of Kamnik in the Upper Carniola region of Slovenia. The settlement includes the hamlet of Ravne (German: Raune).
