= Podstudenec =

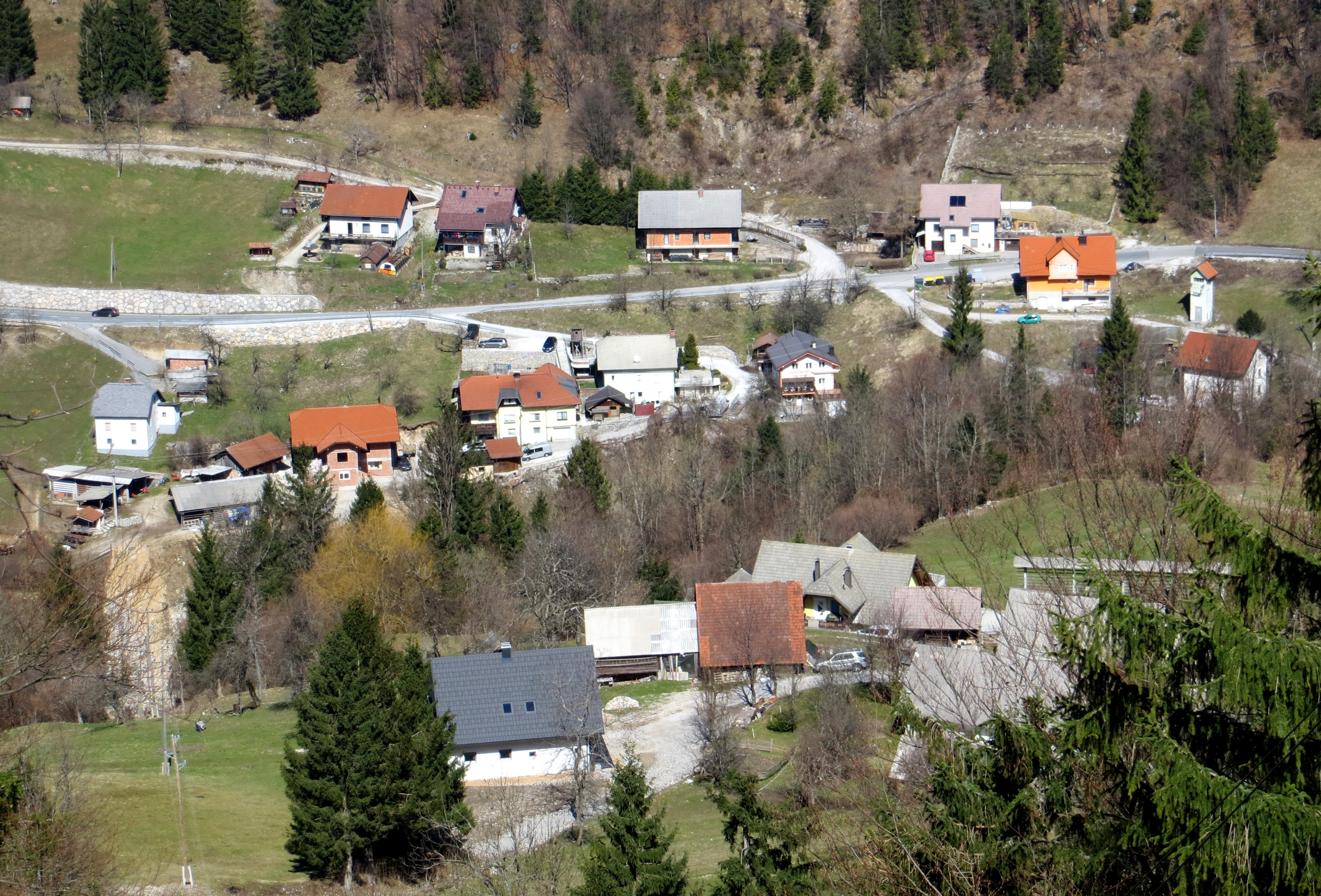

- Location in Slovenia
- Coordinates: 46°15′40.06″N 14°39′16.42″E
- Country: Slovenia
- Traditional region: Upper Carniola
- Statistical region: Central Slovenia
- Municipality: Kamnik

Area
  - Total: 1.39 km^{2} (0.54 sq mi)
- Elevation: 648.7 m (2,128 ft)

Population (2025)
  - Total: 113

Podstudenec (pronounced [pɔtstuˈdɛːnəts]) is a small settlement on Black Creek (Slovene: Črna), a tributary of the Kamnik Bistrica River, in the Municipality of Kamnik in the Upper Carniola region of Slovenia.
