= Zduša =

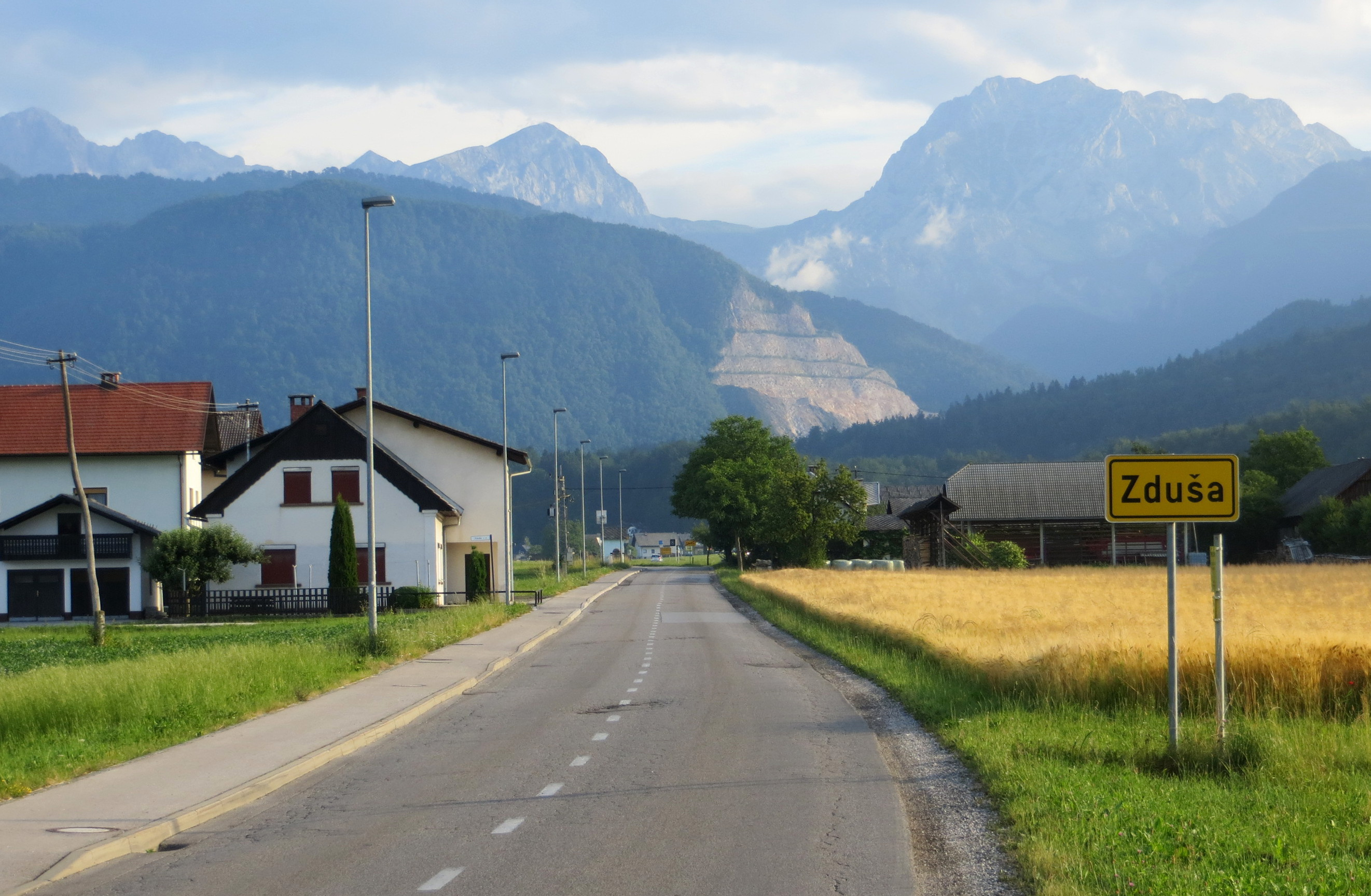

- Location in Slovenia
- Coordinates: 46°14′37.36″N 14°36′37.62″E
- Country: Slovenia
- Traditional region: Upper Carniola
- Statistical region: Central Slovenia
- Municipality: Kamnik

Area
  - Total: 1.42 km^{2} (0.55 sq mi)
- Elevation: 415 m (1,362 ft)

Population (2002)
  - Total: 94

Zduša (pronounced [ˈzduːʃa]; in older sources also Zduše, German: Sdusch) is a settlement on the left bank of the Kamnik Bistrica River in the Municipality of Kamnik in the Upper Carniola region of Slovenia.

A 16th-century mansion in the settlement, known after its last owners as the Rebolj Mansion, is in a state of rapid deterioration.
