= Tučna =

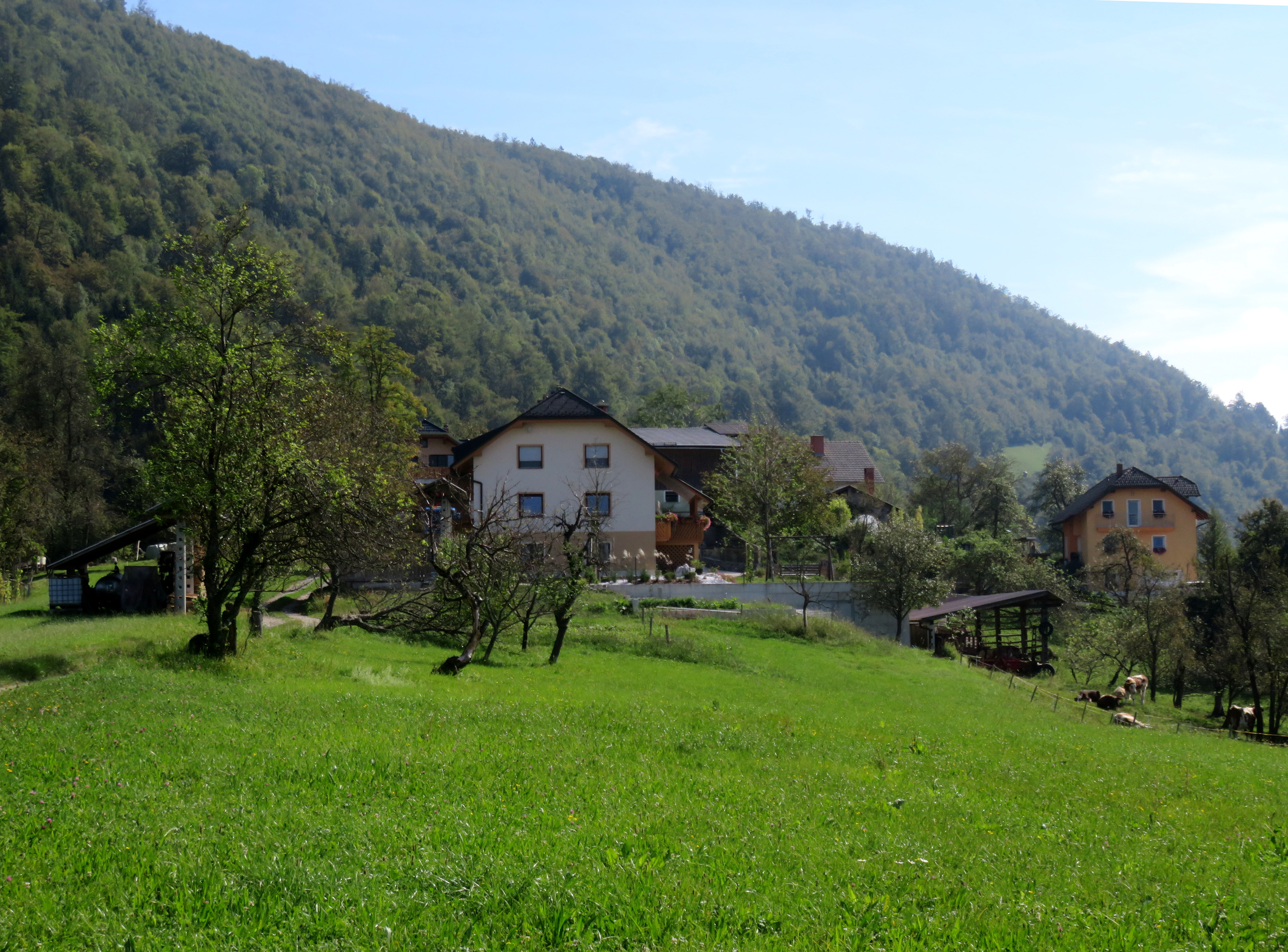

- Location in Slovenia
- Coordinates: 46°14′53.87″N 14°38′13.21″E
- Country: Slovenia
- Traditional region: Upper Carniola
- Statistical region: Central Slovenia
- Municipality: Kamnik

Area
  - Total: 0.98 km^{2} (0.38 sq mi)
- Elevation: 525.5 m (1,724 ft)

Population (2002)
  - Total: 20

Tučna (pronounced [ˈtuːtʃna]; German: Tutschna) is a small settlement in the hills northeast of the town of Kamnik in Upper Carniola region of Slovenia.
