= Vaseno =

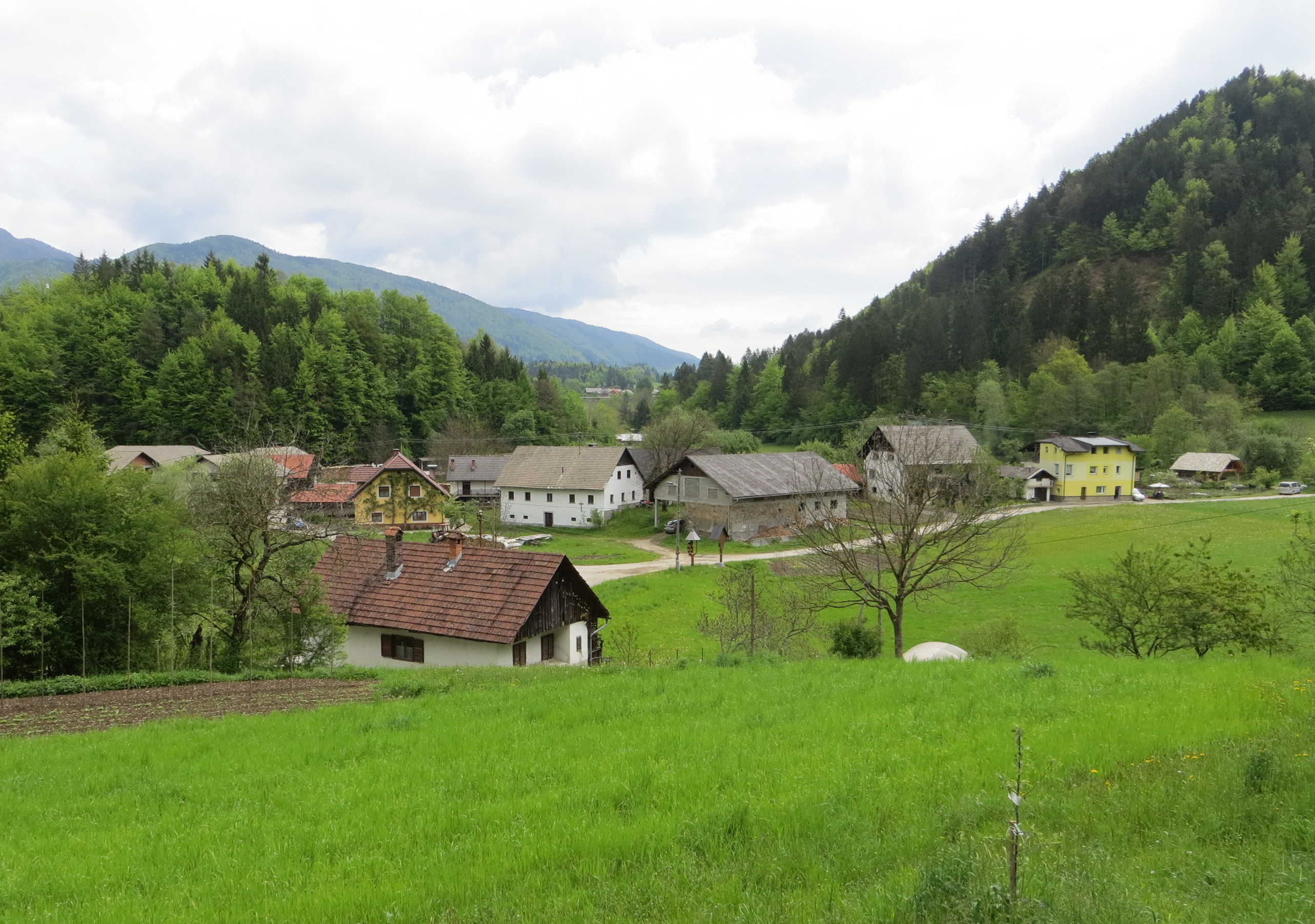

- Location in Slovenia
- Coordinates: 46°12′55.68″N 14°42′11.95″E
- Country: Slovenia
- Traditional region: Upper Carniola
- Statistical region: Central Slovenia
- Municipality: Kamnik

Area
  - Total: 0.59 km^{2} (0.23 sq mi)
- Elevation: 440.6 m (1,446 ft)

Population (2002)
  - Total: 27

Vaseno (pronounced [ʋaˈseːnɔ]; German: Wasseno) is a small settlement in the Tuhinj Valley in the Upper Carniola region of Slovenia.
