= Hrib pri Kamniku =

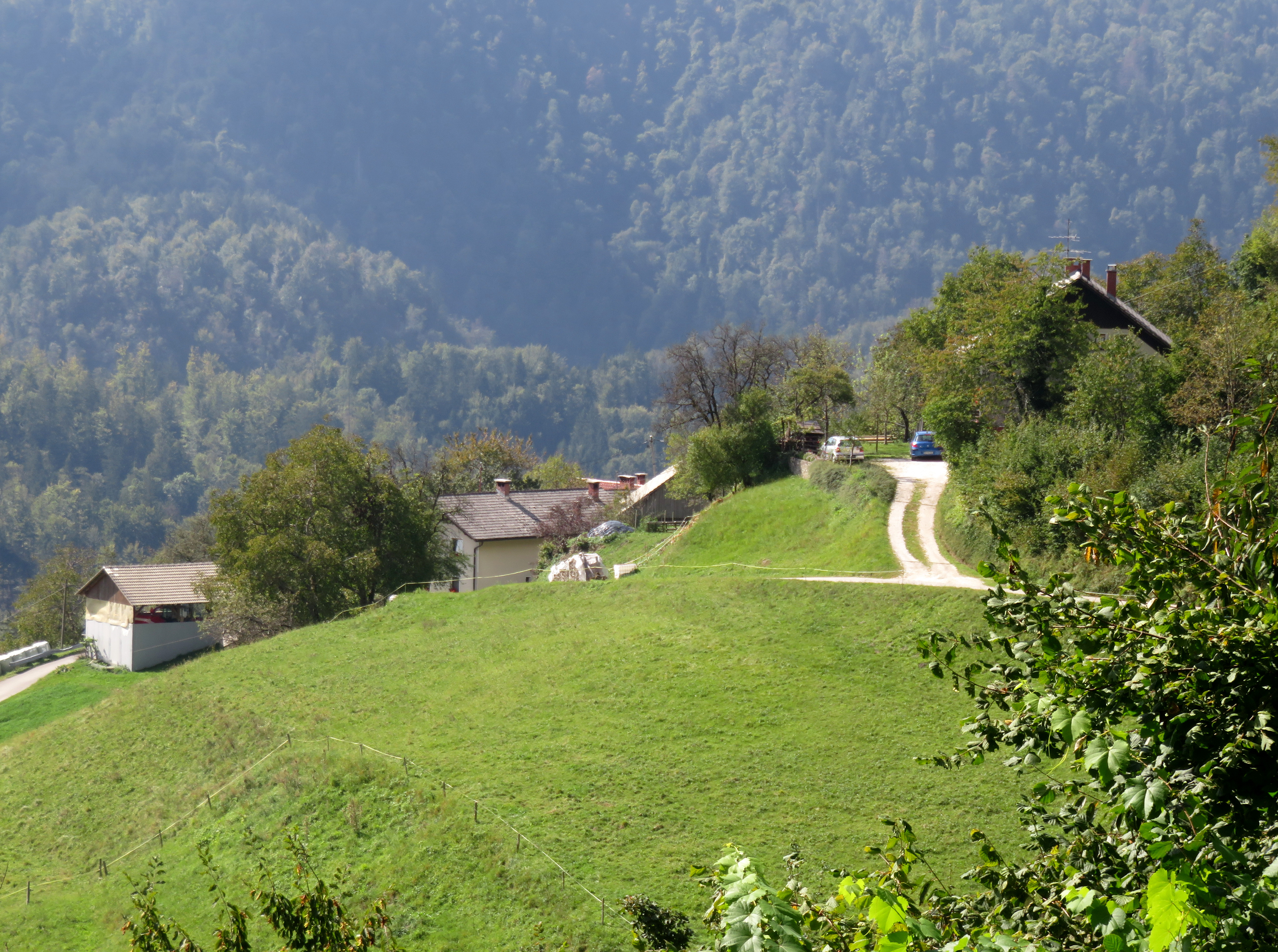

- Location in Slovenia
- Coordinates: 46°14′18.45″N 14°39′20.66″E
- Country: Slovenia
- Traditional region: Upper Carniola
- Statistical region: Central Slovenia
- Municipality: Kamnik
- Elevation: 500.1 m (1,641 ft)

Population (2002)
  - Total: 64

Hrib pri Kamniku (pronounced [ˈxɾiːp pɾi ˈkaːmniku]) is a small settlement in the Municipality of Kamnik in the Upper Carniola region of Slovenia.

== Name ==
The name of the settlement was changed from Hrib to Hrib pri Kamniku in 1955.
