= Zgornji Okrog =

Zgornji Okrog Okrog
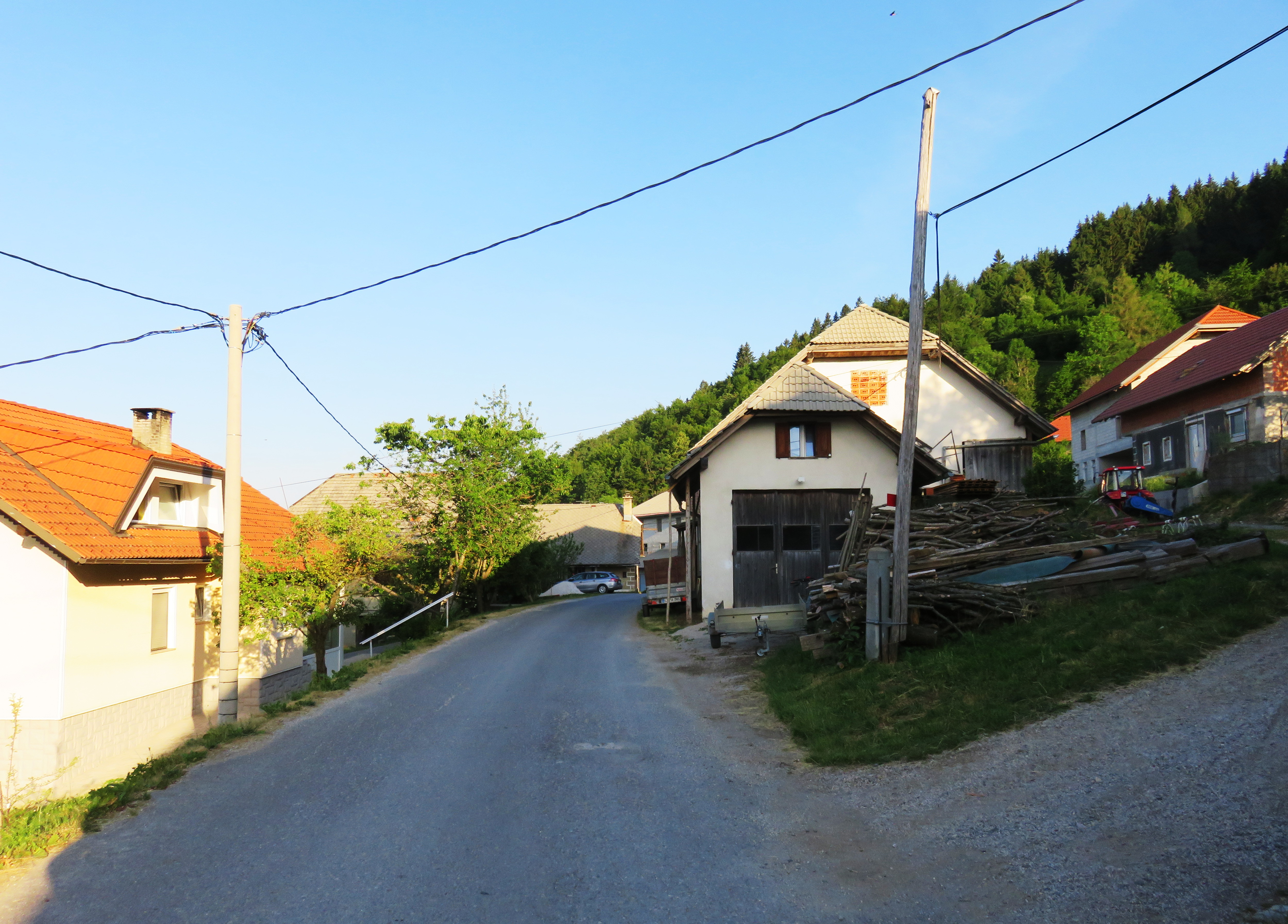

- Location in Slovenia
- Coordinates: 46°13′39″N 14°49′59″E
- Country: Slovenia
- Traditional region: Upper Carniola
- Statistical region: Central Slovenia
- Municipality: Kamnik
- Elevation: 790 m (2,590 ft)

Zgornji Okrog (pronounced [ˈzɡoːɾnji ɔˈkɾoːk]) is a former settlement in the Municipality of Kamnik in central Slovenia. It is now part of the village of Okrog pri Motniku. The area is part of the traditional region of Upper Carniola. The municipality is now included in the Central Slovenia Statistical Region.

== Geography ==
Zgornji Okrog lies below the southern slope of the Menina Pasture Plateau, about 1 kilometer (0.62 mi) north of the main road through Špitalič in the valley of Motnišnica Creek.

== Name ==
The name Zgornji Okrog means 'upper Okrog' and contrasts with Spodnji Okrog (literally 'lower Okrog'), which lies about 540 meters (1,770 ft) to the south-southeast. Together with the related name Krog, the name Okrog is relatively common in Slovenia. It is derived from the common noun krog 'rounded hill', referring to the local topography. Before the Second World War, Spodnji Okrog was known as Kozji Hrbet and Zgornji Okrog was simply called Okrog.

== History ==
In 1952, the three former villages of Peteržilje, Spodnji Okrog, and Zgornji Okrog were combined into a single village named Spodnji Okrog. In 1955, the name of the newly combined settlement was changed from Spodnji Okrog to Okrog pri Motniku.

== Cultural heritage ==
There are two wayside shrines in Zgornji Okrog that are registered as cultural heritage. The first one stands in the western part of the settlement and dates from the twentieth century. It marks the place where mourners would rest with the deceased on the way to the church in Špitalič. A second shrine stands east of the village along a field road.
