= Žlabor =

- Location in Slovenia
- Coordinates: 46°18′52.34″N 14°57′8.93″E
- Country: Slovenia
- Traditional region: Styria
- Statistical region: Savinja
- Municipality: Nazarje

Area
  - Total: 1.82 km^{2} (0.70 sq mi)
- Elevation: 348.2 m (1,142 ft)

Population (2002)
  - Total: 123

Žlabor (pronounced [ˈʒlaːbɔɾ]) is a small settlement on the right bank of the Dreta River south of Nazarje in Slovenia. The area belongs to the traditional region of Styria and is now included in the Savinja Statistical Region.
