= Menina =

Menina may refer to:

- "Menina do alto da serra", the Portuguese entry in the Eurovision Song Contest 1971
- Menina Izildinha (1897–1911), a popular saint in Brazilian Catholicism
- Hamza Ménina (born 1981), Algerian triple jumper
- Menina, a village in Thesprotia, Greece

== See also ==
- Battle of Menina, fought in Menina, Greece in 1944, during the German occupation of Greece
- Menina Pasture Plateau, a plateau in Slovenia
- Las Meninas (disambiguation)
