= Municipality of Nazarje =

Municipality of Slovenia

Municipality of Nazarje Občina Nazarje
- Municipality
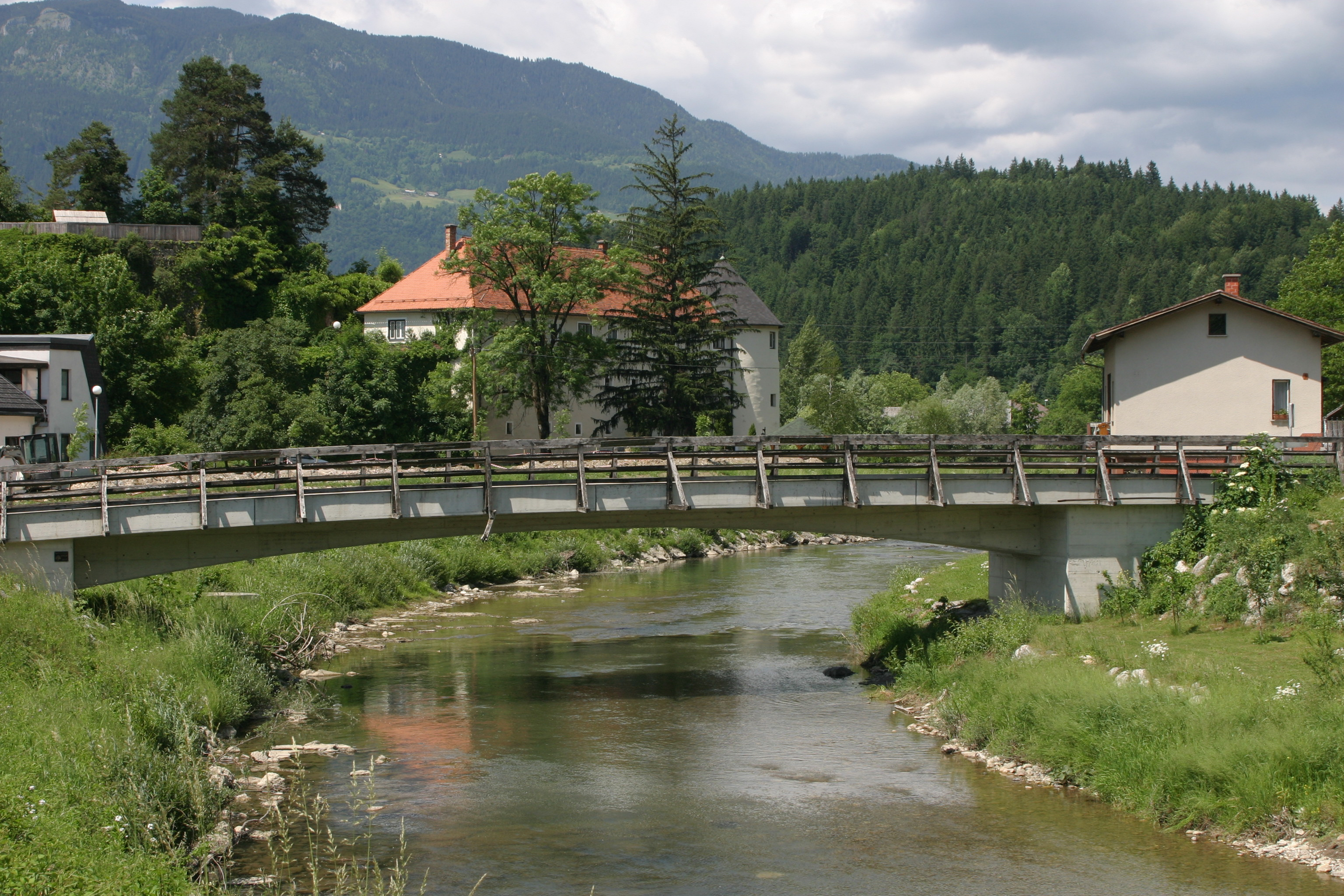

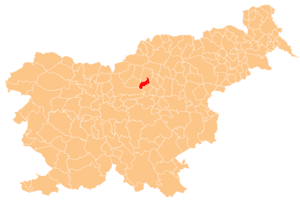
- Location of the Municipality of Nazarje in Slovenia
- Coordinates: 46°11′24″N 14°34′12″E
- Country: Slovenia

Government
  - Mayor: Ivan Purnat (Independent)

Area
  - Total: 43.4 km^{2} (16.8 sq mi)

Population (2010)
  - Total: 2,596
  - Density: 59.8/km^{2} (155/sq mi)
- Time zone: UTC+01 (CET)
  - Summer (DST): UTC+02 (CEST)
- Website: www.nazarje.si

The Municipality of Nazarje (pronounced [ˈnaːzaɾjɛ]; Slovene: Občina Nazarje) is a municipality in Slovenia. It lies along the Dreta River. The seat of the municipality is the town of Nazarje. The area belongs to the traditional region of Styria and it is now included in the Savinja Statistical Region. The municipality was established on 3 October 1994, when the former larger Municipality of Mozirje was subdivided into the municipalities of Gornji Grad, Ljubno, Luče, Mozirje, and Nazarje. On 6 August 1998 the settlement of Prihova was transferred from the Municipality of Mozirje to the Municipality of Nazarje.

== Settlements ==
In addition to the municipal seat of Nazarje, the municipality also includes the following settlements:

- Brdo
- Čreta pri Kokarjah
- Dobletina
- Kokarje
- Lačja Vas
- Potok
- Prihova
- Pusto Polje
- Rovt pod Menino
- Šmartno ob Dreti
- Spodnje Kraše
- Volog
- Zavodice
- Žlabor
