= Zavodice =

- Location in Slovenia
- Coordinates: 46°18′38.75″N 14°57′43.07″E
- Country: Slovenia
- Traditional region: Styria
- Statistical region: Savinja
- Municipality: Nazarje

Area
  - Total: 1.18 km^{2} (0.46 sq mi)
- Elevation: 450.9 m (1,479 ft)

Population (2002)
  - Total: 45

Zavodice (pronounced [zaʋɔˈdiːtsɛ]) is a small settlement in the hills southeast of Nazarje in Slovenia. The area belongs to the traditional region of Styria and is now included in the Savinja Statistical Region.
