= Lačja Vas =

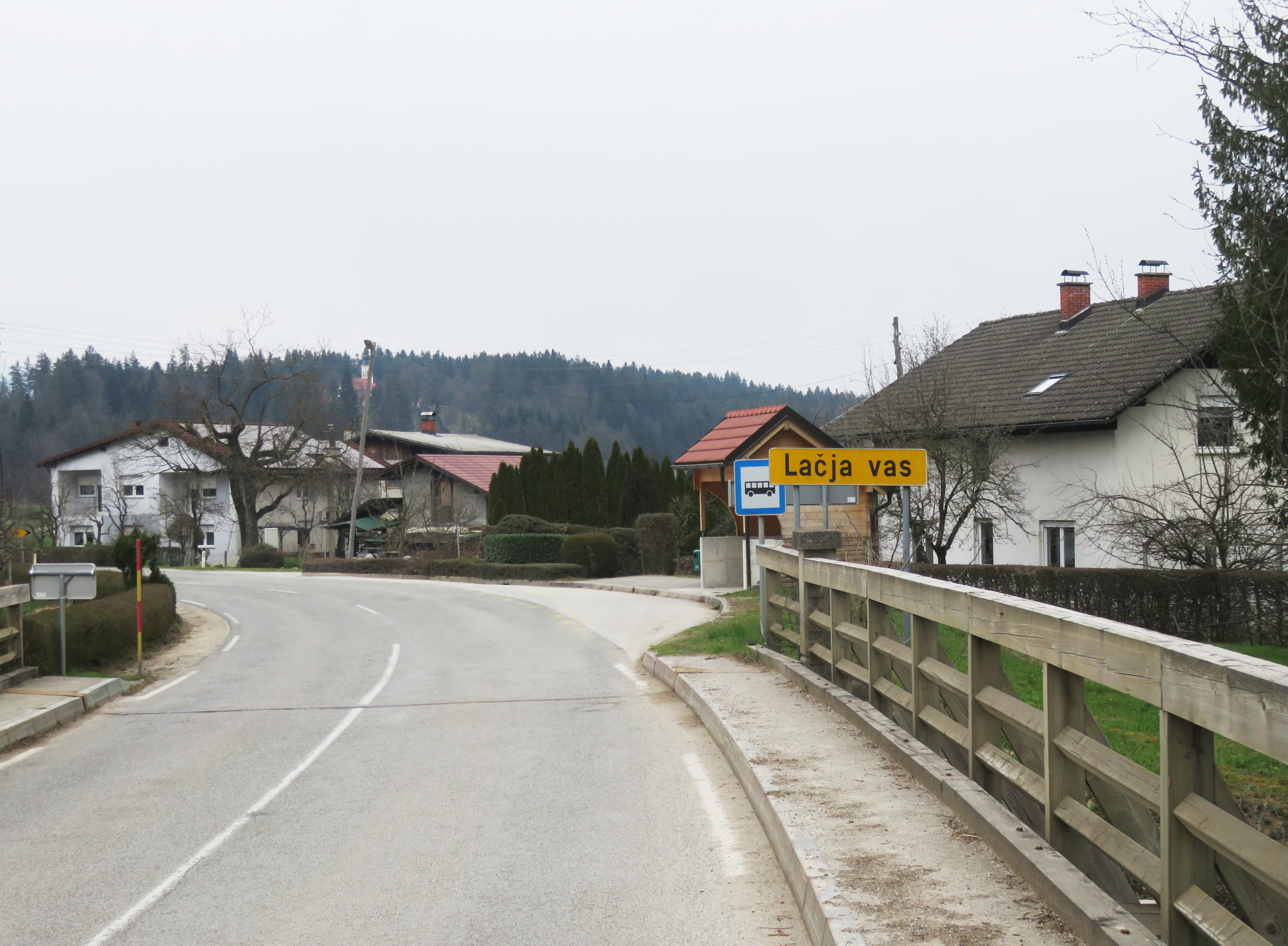

- Location in Slovenia
- Coordinates: 46°18′3.06″N 14°55′39.72″E
- Country: Slovenia
- Traditional region: Styria
- Statistical region: Savinja
- Municipality: Nazarje

Area
  - Total: 1.49 km^{2} (0.58 sq mi)
- Elevation: 358.9 m (1,177 ft)

Population (2002)
  - Total: 103

Lačja Vas (pronounced [ˈlaːtʃja ˈʋaːs]) is a village on the left bank of the Dreta River in the Municipality of Nazarje in Slovenia. The area belongs to the traditional region of Styria and is now included in the Savinja Statistical Region.

The local church, built on a slight elevation north of the main settlement, is dedicated to Saint Catherine and belongs to the Parish of Rečica ob Savinji. It was first mentioned in written documents dating to 1631. The building was refurbished in the 18th and late 19th centuries.
