= Podlom =

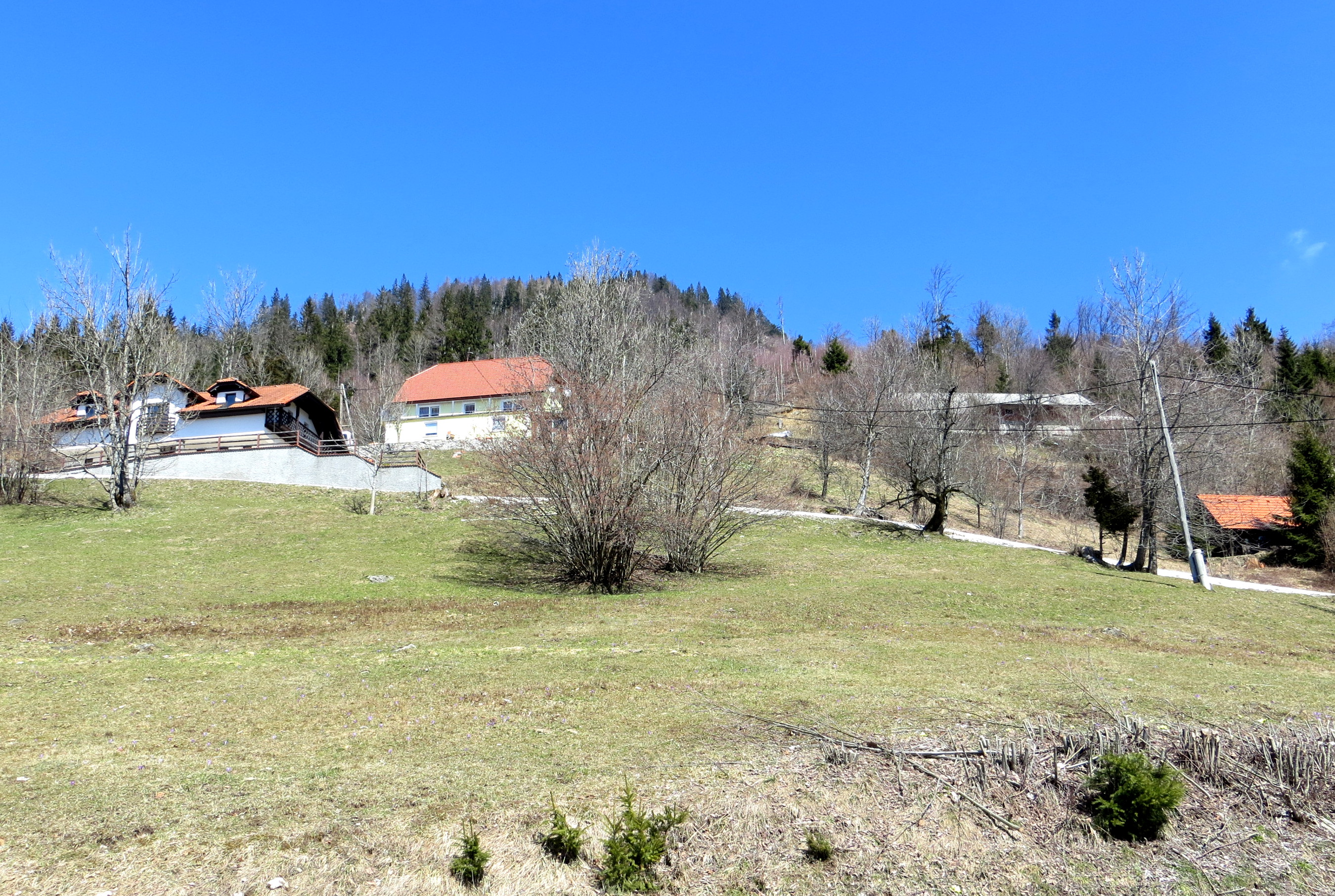

- Location in Slovenia
- Coordinates: 46°15′40.13″N 14°41′34.65″E
- Country: Slovenia
- Traditional region: Upper Carniola
- Statistical region: Central Slovenia
- Municipality: Kamnik

Area
  - Total: 0.9 km^{2} (0.35 sq mi)
- Elevation: 892.7 m (2,929 ft)

Population (2002)
  - Total: 38

Podlom (pronounced [pɔˈdlɔm]) is a small settlement in the Municipality of Kamnik in the Upper Carniola region of Slovenia. It lies in the Kamnik Alps, just under the Črnivec Pass.
