= Spodnje Kraše =

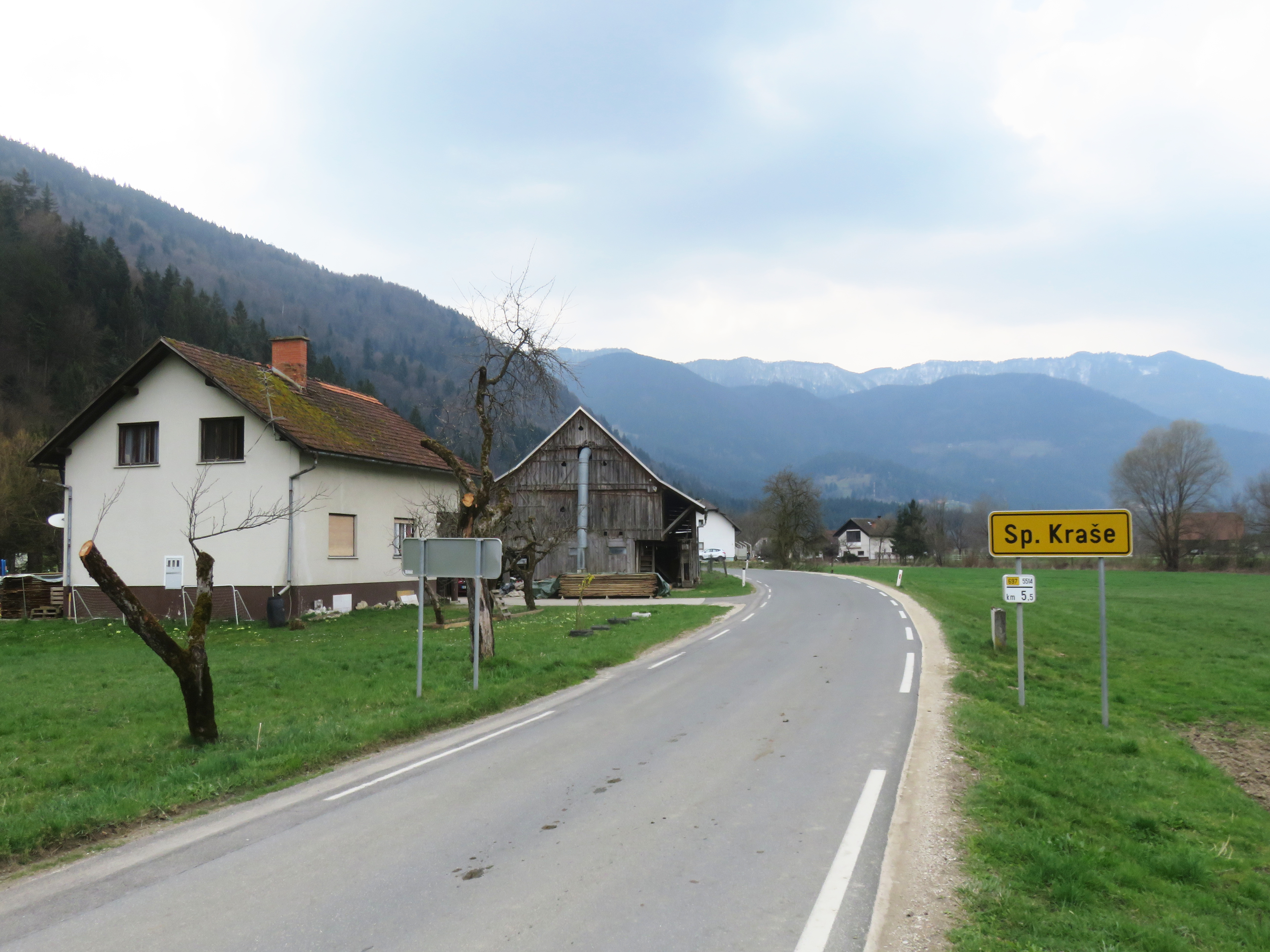

- Location in Slovenia
- Coordinates: 46°17′11.83″N 14°54′18.96″E
- Country: Slovenia
- Traditional region: Styria
- Statistical region: Savinja
- Municipality: Nazarje

Area
  - Total: 1.97 km^{2} (0.76 sq mi)
- Elevation: 369 m (1,211 ft)

Population (2002)
  - Total: 150

Spodnje Kraše (pronounced [ˈspoːdnjɛ ˈkɾaːʃɛ]) is a settlement on the Dreta River in the Municipality of Nazarje in Slovenia. The area belongs to the traditional region of Styria and is now included in the Savinja Statistical Region.
