= Sveti Jošt =

Sveti Jošt or Šentjošt may refer to several places in Slovenia:

- Rovt pod Menino, a settlement in the Municipality of Nazarje (known as Sveti Jošt until 1955)
- Šentjošt nad Horjulom, a settlement in the Municipality of Dobrova–Polhov Gradec (formerly Sveti Jošt nad Vrhniko)
- Šentjošt, Novo Mesto, a settlement in the Municipality of Novo Mesto
- Sveti Jošt nad Kranjem, a location in the Municipality of Kranj
