= Potok, Nazarje =

Potok
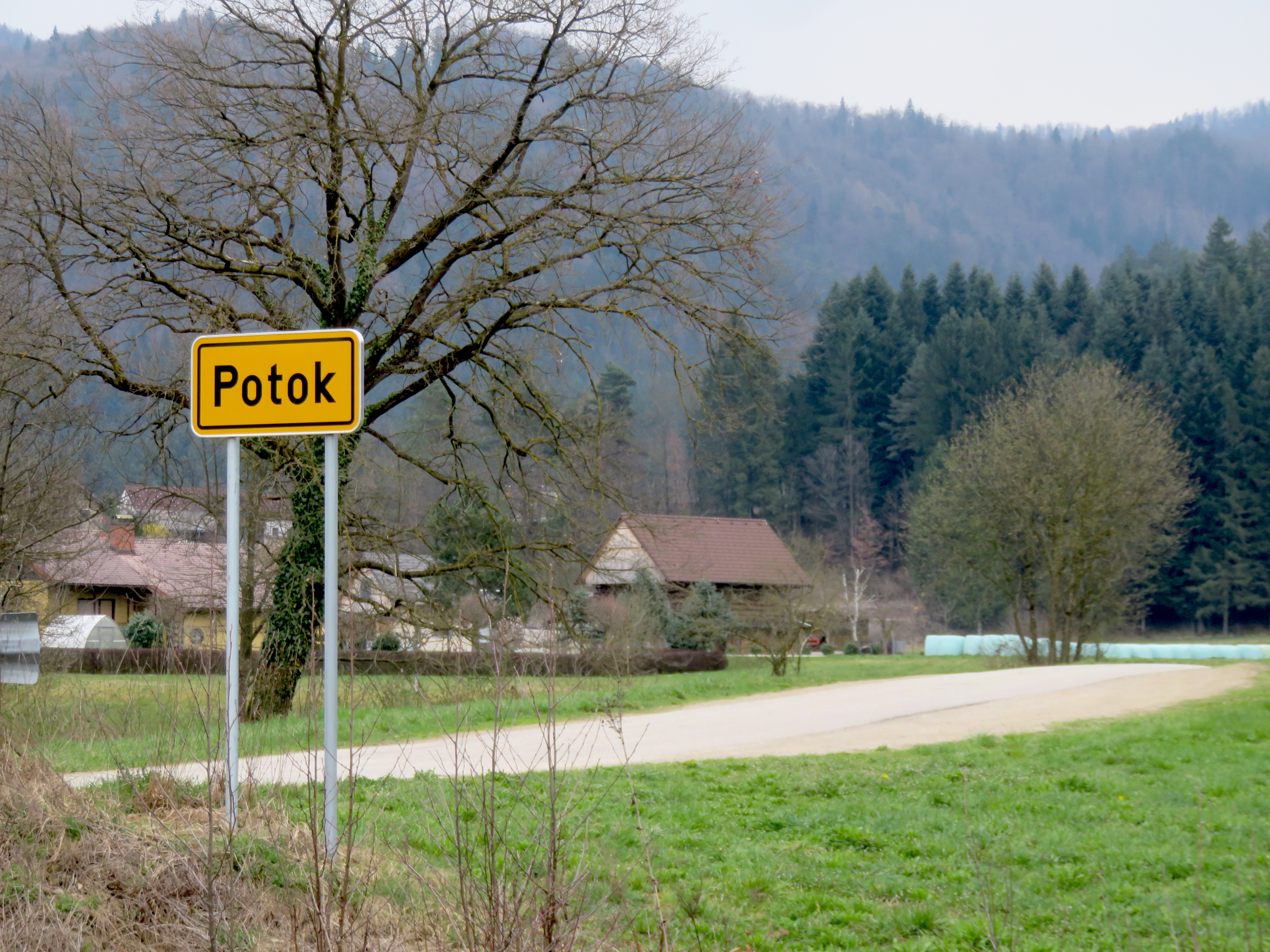

- Location in Slovenia
- Coordinates: 46°17′41.37″N 14°55′47.69″E
- Country: Slovenia
- Traditional region: Styria
- Statistical region: Savinja
- Municipality: Nazarje

Area
  - Total: 1 km^{2} (0.39 sq mi)
- Elevation: 362.1 m (1,188 ft)

Population (2002)
  - Total: 141

Potok (pronounced [ˈpɔːtɔk]) is a small village on the right bank of the Dreta River in the Municipality of Nazarje in Slovenia. The area belongs to the traditional region of Styria and is now included in the Savinja Statistical Region.

== Name ==
The name of the settlement literally means 'creek, stream'. Mostni graben, a tributary of the Dreta River, flows through the village.
