= Pusto Polje =

Village in Styria, Slovenia

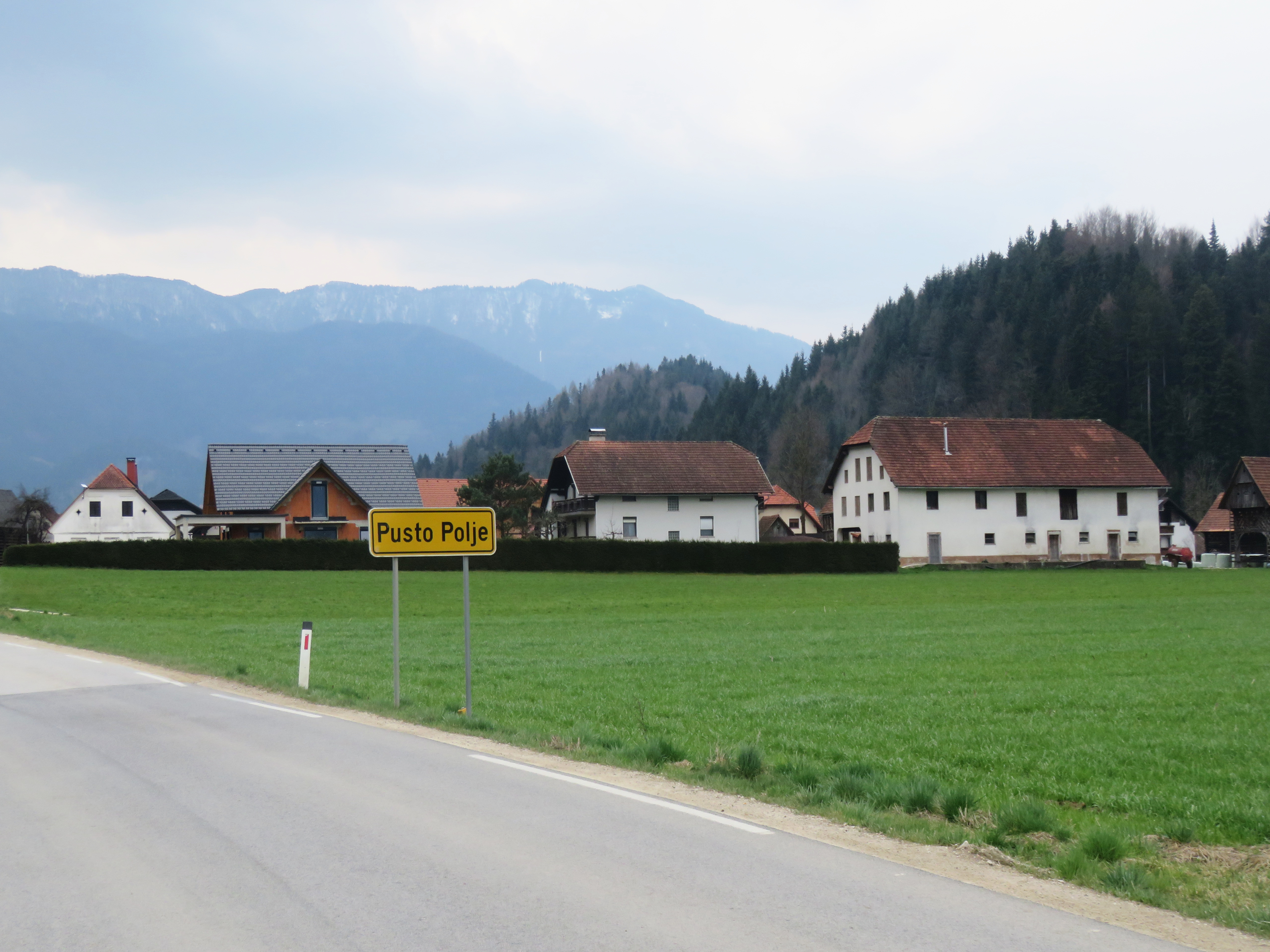

- Location in Slovenia
- Coordinates: 46°17′33.57″N 14°55′6.58″E
- Country: Slovenia
- Traditional region: Styria
- Statistical region: Savinja
- Municipality: Nazarje

Area
  - Total: 5.52 km^{2} (2.13 sq mi)
- Elevation: 362.3 m (1,189 ft)

Population (2002)
  - Total: 111

Pusto Polje (pronounced [ˈpuːstɔ ˈpoːljɛ]) is a small village on the right bank of the Dreta River in the Municipality of Nazarje in Slovenia. The area is part of the traditional region of Styria and is now included in the Savinja Statistical Region.
