= Prihova =

Prihova may refer to:

- Prihova, Nazarje, settlement on the left bank of the Savinja River immediately north of Nazarje in Slovenia.
- Prihova, Oplotnica, settlement in the Municipality of Oplotnica in northeastern Slovenia.
