= Dobletina =

- Location in Slovenia
- Coordinates: 46°18′48.12″N 14°56′39.02″E
- Country: Slovenia
- Traditional region: Styria
- Statistical region: Savinja
- Municipality: Nazarje

Area
  - Total: 0.72 km^{2} (0.28 sq mi)
- Elevation: 350.2 m (1,149 ft)

Population (2002)
  - Total: 123

Dobletina (pronounced [dɔblɛˈtiːna]) is a settlement immediately south of Nazarje in Slovenia. The area belongs to the traditional region of Styria and is now included in the Savinja Statistical Region.
