= Volog =

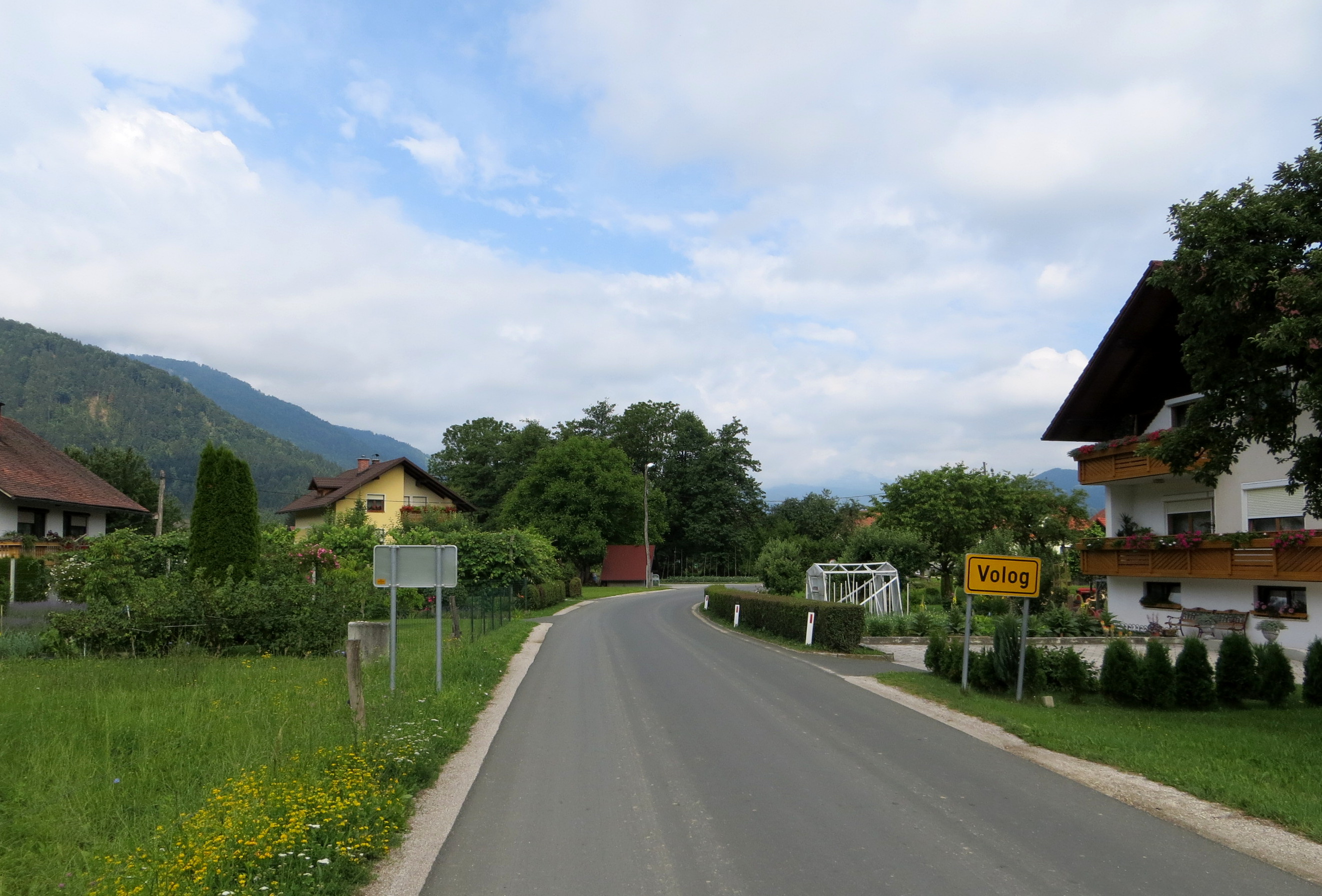

- Location in Slovenia
- Coordinates: 46°16′58.79″N 14°52′50.68″E
- Country: Slovenia
- Traditional region: Styria
- Statistical region: Savinja
- Municipality: Nazarje

Area
  - Total: 5.6 km^{2} (2.2 sq mi)
- Elevation: 380.5 m (1,248 ft)

Population (2002)
  - Total: 138

Volog (pronounced [ˈʋɔːlɔk]) is a small settlement west of Šmartno ob Dreti in the Municipality of Nazarje in Slovenia. The area belongs to the traditional region of Styria and is now included in the Savinja Statistical Region.

== Name ==
Volog was attested in written sources as Wolog in 1231 and as Wuͤlog in 1383. The name Volog is derived from the noun *ǫlogъ, a dialect variant of *logъ '(swampy) meadow; (marshy) grove', referring to the local terrain. This base form is also found in the Hutsul dialect word улога (uloha) 'level field'.
