= Spodnji Okrog =

Spodnji Okrog Kozji Hrbet
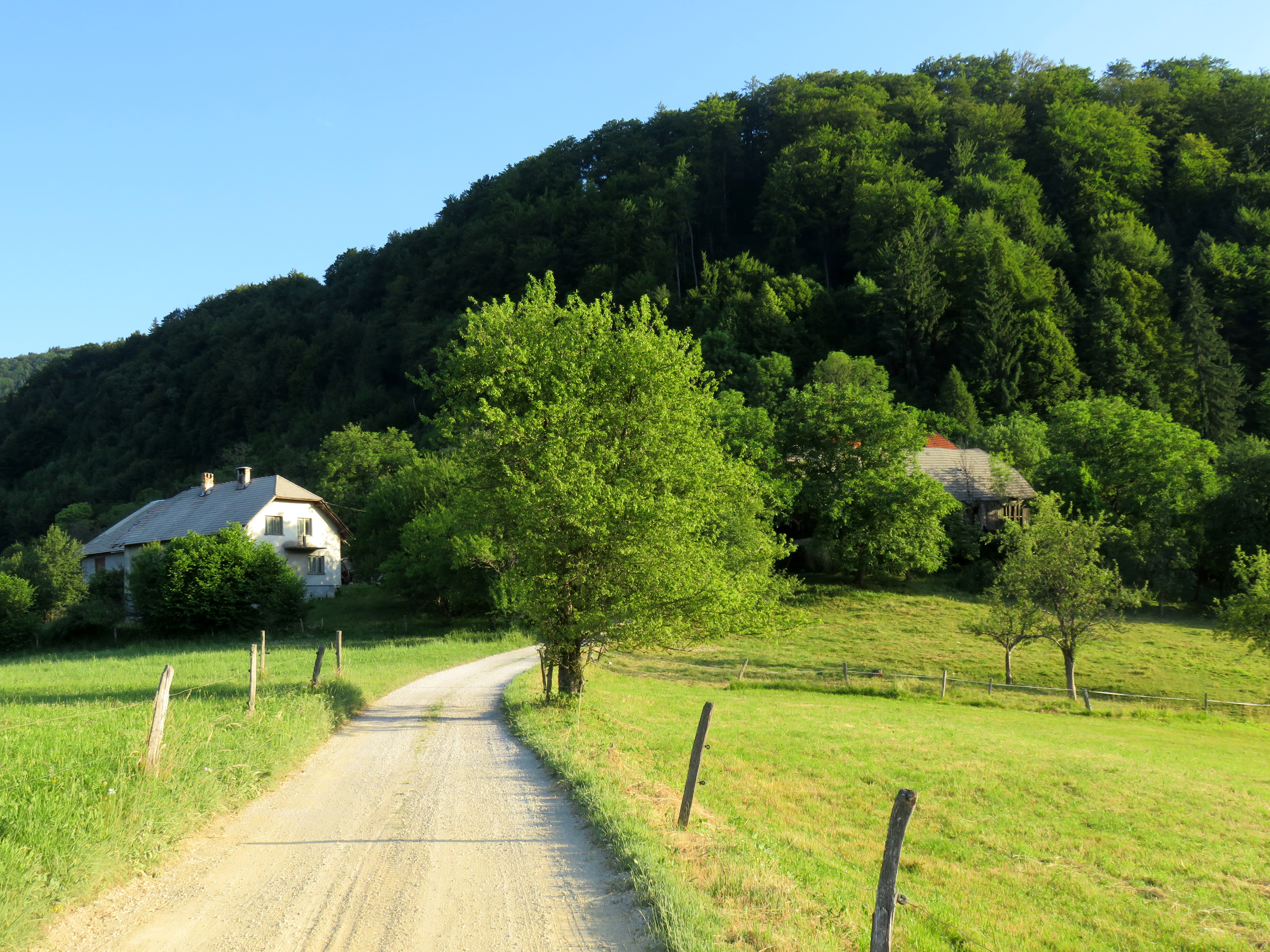

- Location in Slovenia
- Coordinates: 46°13′23″N 14°50′11″E
- Country: Slovenia
- Traditional region: Upper Carniola
- Statistical region: Central Slovenia
- Municipality: Kamnik
- Elevation: 700 m (2,300 ft)

Spodnji Okrog (pronounced [ˈspoːdnji ɔˈkɾoːk]) is a former settlement in the Municipality of Kamnik in central Slovenia. It is now part of the village of Okrog pri Motniku. The area is part of the traditional region of Upper Carniola. The municipality is now included in the Central Slovenia Statistical Region.

== Geography ==
Spodnji Okrog lies below the southern slope of Deer Peak (Jelen vrh, elevation: 850 meters or 2,790 feet), about 800 meters (2,600 ft) north of the main road through Špitalič in the valley of Motnišnica Creek.

== Name ==
Spodnji Okrog was attested as Puxruk in 1261, Pokkesrukke in 1265, Poxrugkh in 1307, Bukzrukk in 1329, and Puochsruck in 1488. Before the Second World War, the village was known as Kozji Hrbet (in older sources also Kozji herbt; literally, 'goat back'). The name Spodnji Okrog means 'lower Okrog' and contrasts with Zgornji Okrog (literally 'upper Okrog'), which lies about 540 meters (1,770 ft) to the north-northwest. Together with the related name Krog, the name Okrog is relatively common in Slovenia. It is derived from the common noun krog 'rounded hill', referring to the local topography.

== History ==
In the past, the trade route between the Tuhinj Valley and Špitalič passed through Spodnji Okrog. In 1952, the three former villages of Peteržilje, Spodnji Okrog, and Zgornji Okrog were combined into a single village named Spodnji Okrog. In 1955, the name of the newly combined settlement was changed from Spodnji Okrog to Okrog pri Motniku.

== Cultural heritage ==
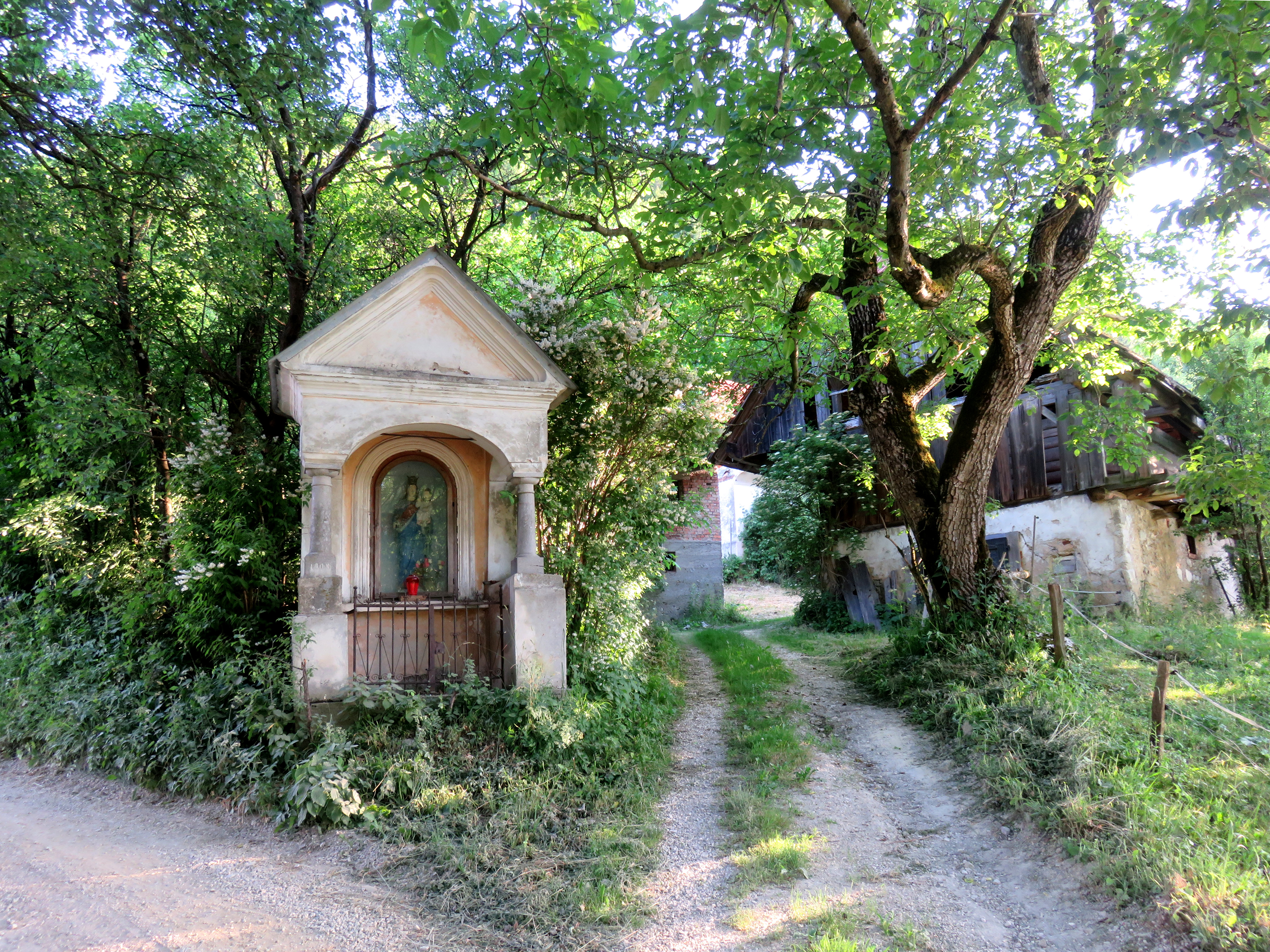
The Mošnik shrine in Spodnji Okrog

There is a chapel-shrine in Spodnji Okrog known as the Mošnik shrine (Slovene: Mošnikova kapelica). It stands in the southern part of the settlement and dates from 1903.
