= Čreta =

Čreta may refer to several places in Slovenia:

- Čreta, Hoče–Slivnica, a settlement in the Municipality of Hoče–Slivnica
- Čreta, Vransko, a settlement in the Municipality of Vransko
- Čreta pri Kokarjah, a settlement in the Municipality of Nazarje
