= Reber, Kamnik =

Reber
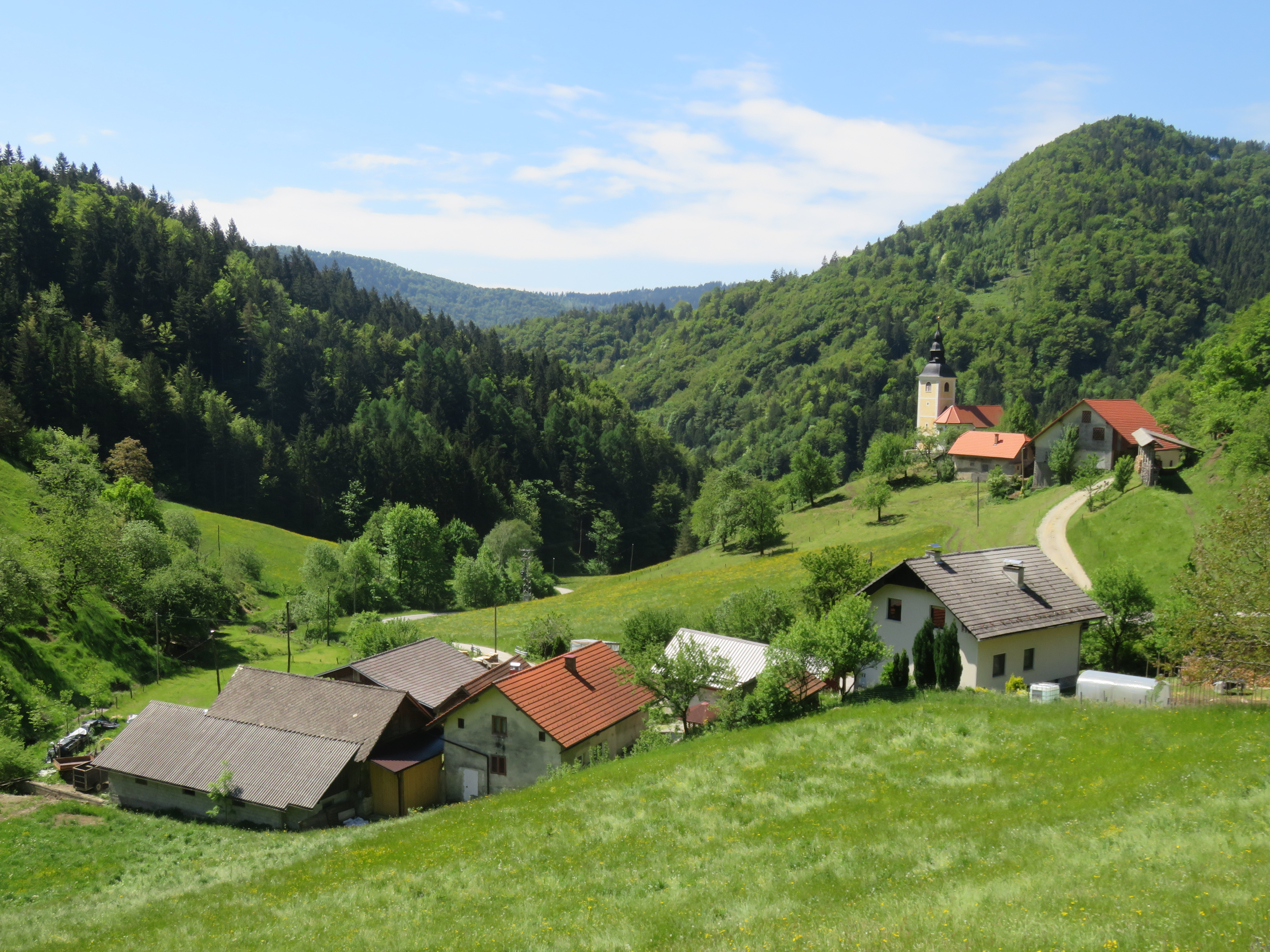

- Location in Slovenia
- Coordinates: 46°13′53″N 14°52′22″E
- Country: Slovenia
- Traditional region: Upper Carniola
- Statistical region: Central Slovenia
- Municipality: Kamnik
- Elevation: 610 m (2,000 ft)

Reber (pronounced [ˈɾeːbəɾ], in older sources also Rebro) is a former settlement in the Municipality of Kamnik in central Slovenia. It is now part of the village of Bela. The area is part of the traditional region of Upper Carniola. The municipality is now included in the Central Slovenia Statistical Region.

== Geography ==
Reber stands on the sunny side of a slope about 2 kilometers (1.2 mi) north of the main road from Kamnik to Motnik.

== Name ==
The name Reber is derived from the common noun reber 'slope, hillside', reflecting its geographical position. It is a relatively common name in Slovenia, as both a toponym and an oronym. The former village of Reber lies on a slope rising from the Motnišnica Valley to the Menina Pasture Plateau.

== History ==
Reber was annexed by Bela in 1953, ending its existence as an independent settlement.
