= Nadlistnik =

- Location in Slovenia
- Coordinates: 46°13′23″N 14°51′47″E
- Country: Slovenia
- Traditional region: Upper Carniola
- Statistical region: Central Slovenia
- Municipality: Kamnik
- Elevation: 740 m (2,430 ft)

Nadlistnik (pronounced [naˈdliːstnik], in some sources Nadlisnik) is a former settlement in the Municipality of Kamnik in central Slovenia. It is now part of the village of Bela. The area is part of the traditional region of Upper Carniola. The municipality is now included in the Central Slovenia Statistical Region.

== Geography ==
Nadlistnik lies below the south slope of Nadlistnik Hill (elevation: 830 meters or 2,720 feet), about 1 kilometer (0.62 mi) north of the main road through Bela in the valley of Motnišnica Creek.

== Name ==
Nadlisnik was attested in historical sources as Nadlisnickh and Nadlisnigk in 1488.

== History ==
Nadlistnik was annexed by Bela in 1952, ending its existence as an independent settlement.

== Notable people ==
Notable people that were born or lived in Nadlistnik include:

- Gašper Križnik (1848–1904), ethnologist and linguist
