= Bela, Kamnik =

Bela
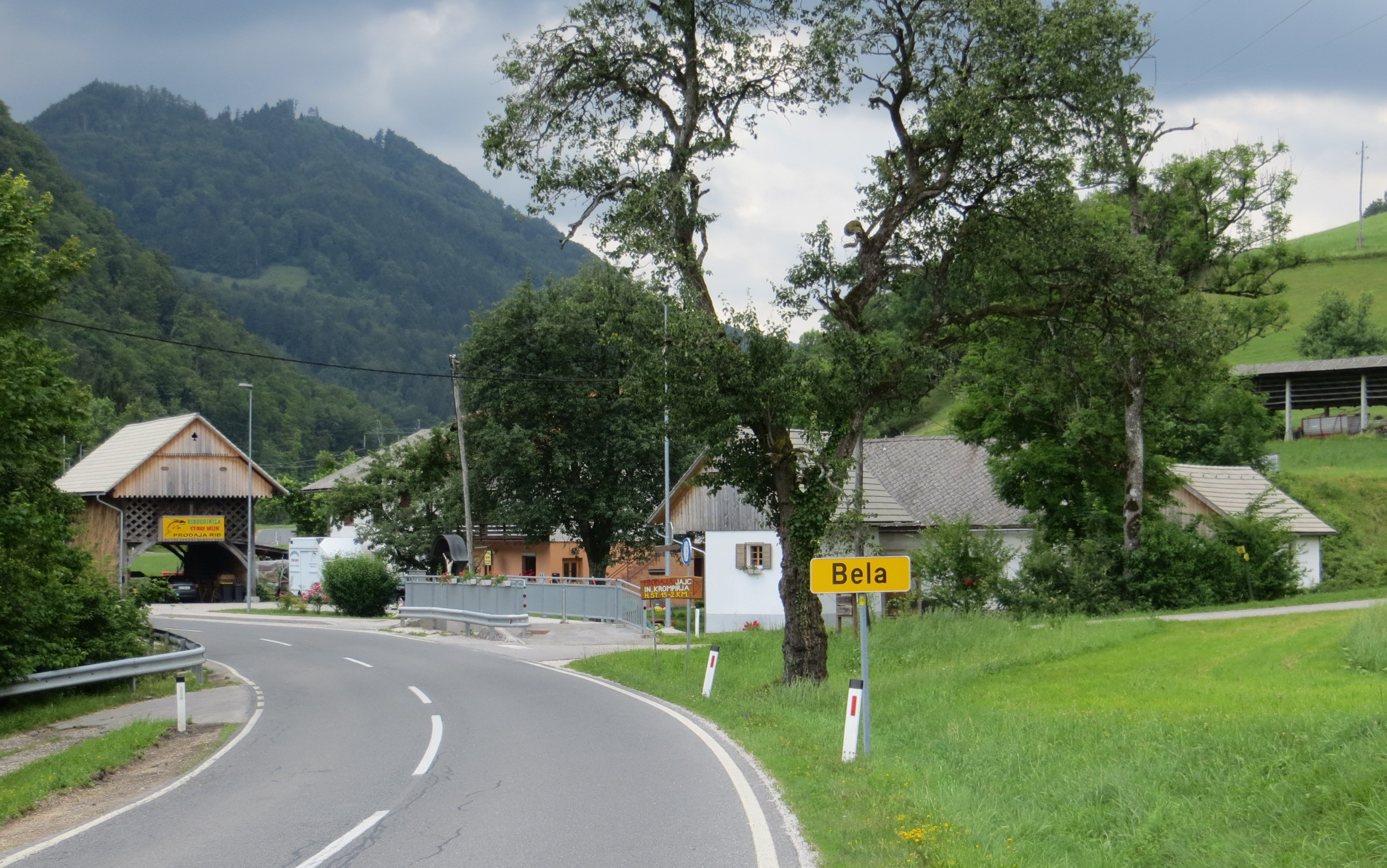

- Location in Slovenia
- Coordinates: 46°12′49.3″N 14°51′33.76″E
- Country: Slovenia
- Traditional region: Upper Carniola
- Statistical region: Central Slovenia
- Municipality: Kamnik
- Elevation: 473.8 m (1,554 ft)

Population (2002)
  - Total: 89

Bela (pronounced [ˈbeːla]) is a small settlement in the Municipality of Kamnik in the Upper Carniola region of Slovenia. It includes the hamlets of Sveti Miklavž (German: Sankt Nikolaus), Bela, Mala Ravan (German: Kleinraun), Nadlisnik, Reber (in older sources also Rebro), Slopi, and Vodlan (German: Wodlan).

== Name ==
Bela was attested as Uelach in 1229 and Velach in 1243, among other spellings. Locally, the settlement is also known as Špitalska Bela (i.e., Bela near Špitalič).

== Church ==
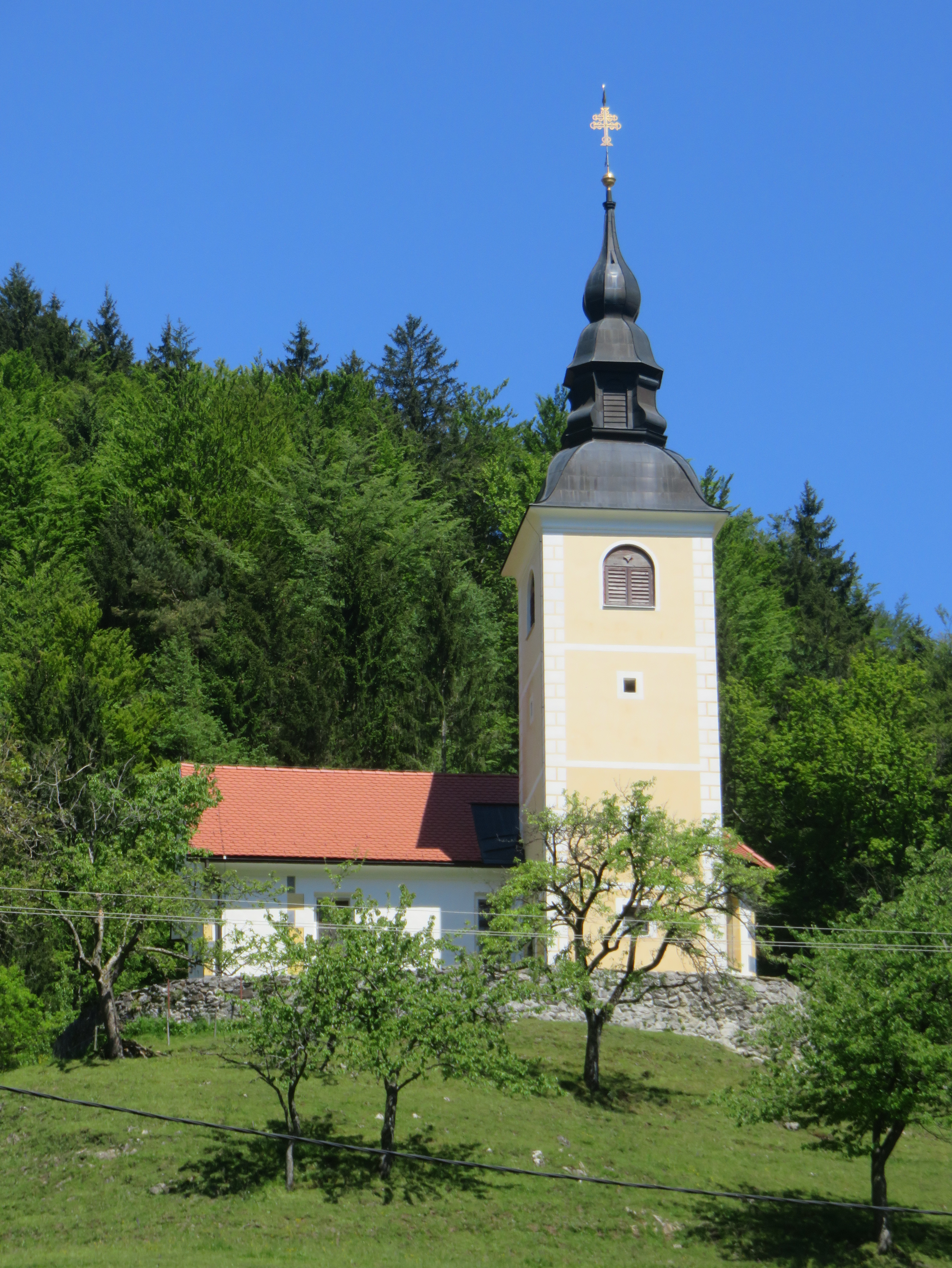
Saint Nicholas's Church

The local church above the settlement, in the former village of Reber, is dedicated to Saint Nicholas and is an example of a village chapel of ease with a star-vaulted sanctuary, dating to the 15th century.
