= Brdo, Nazarje =

Brdo
- Location in Slovenia
- Coordinates: 46°17′49.66″N 14°53′6.46″E
- Country: Slovenia
- Traditional region: Styria
- Statistical region: Savinja
- Municipality: Nazarje

Area
  - Total: 1.02 km^{2} (0.39 sq mi)
- Elevation: 458 m (1,503 ft)

Population (2002)
  - Total: 47

Brdo (pronounced [ˈbəɾdɔ]) is a small settlement in the Municipality of Nazarje in Slovenia. The area belongs to the traditional region of Styria and is now included in the Savinja Statistical Region.
