= Prihova, Nazarje =

Prihova
- Location in Slovenia
- Coordinates: 46°19′23.1″N 14°56′40.39″E
- Country: Slovenia
- Traditional region: Styria
- Statistical region: Savinja
- Municipality: Nazarje

Area
  - Total: 2.03 km^{2} (0.78 sq mi)
- Elevation: 347 m (1,138 ft)

Population (2002)
  - Total: 185

Prihova (pronounced [ˈpɾiːxɔʋa]) is a settlement on the left bank of the Savinja River immediately north of Nazarje in Slovenia. The area belongs to the traditional region of Styria and is now included in the Savinja Statistical Region.
