= Čreta pri Kokarjah =

Čreta pri Kokarjah Čreta (until 1955), Čreta pri Kokarju (1955–1990)
- Location in Slovenia
- Coordinates: 46°17′4.8″N 14°56′53.61″E
- Country: Slovenia
- Traditional region: Styria
- Statistical region: Savinja
- Municipality: Nazarje

Area
  - Total: 4.65 km^{2} (1.80 sq mi)
- Elevation: 635.9 m (2,086 ft)

Population (2002)
  - Total: 27

Čreta pri Kokarjah (pronounced [ˈtʃɾeːta pɾi ˈkoːkaɾjax]) is a dispersed settlement in the hills south of Nazarje in Slovenia. The area belongs to the traditional region of Styria and is now included in the Savinja Statistical Region.

== Name ==
The name of the settlement was changed from Čreta to Čreta pri Kokarju in 1955. It was changed again in 1990 to Čreta pri Kokarjah.
