= Rovt pod Menino =

Rovt pod Menino Sveti Jošt (until 1955), Rovte pri Nazarjih (until 1963)
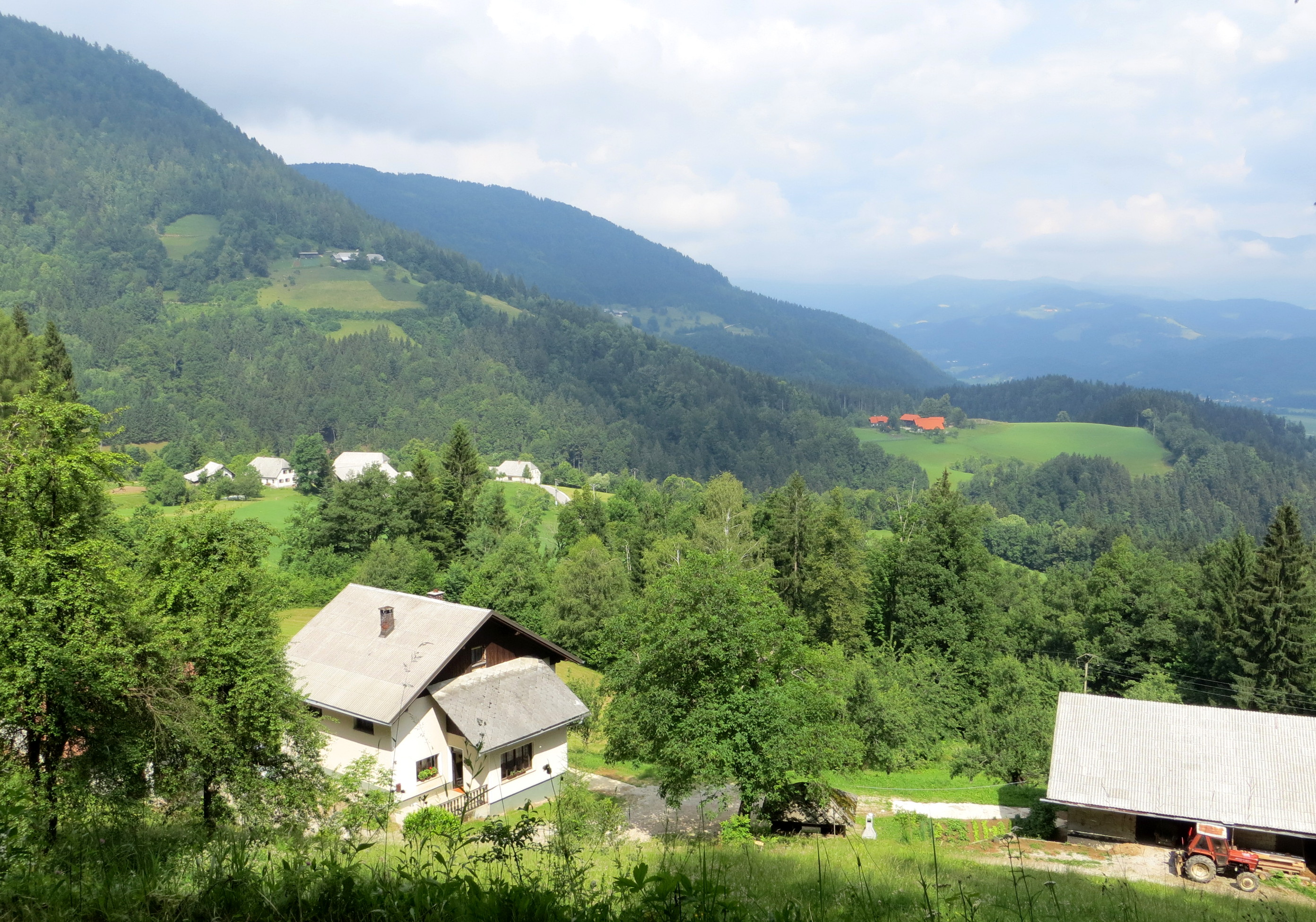

- Location in Slovenia
- Coordinates: 46°15′45.93″N 14°53′9.98″E
- Country: Slovenia
- Traditional region: Styria
- Statistical region: Savinja
- Municipality: Nazarje

Area
  - Total: 13.38 km^{2} (5.17 sq mi)
- Elevation: 650.3 m (2,134 ft)

Population (2002)
  - Total: 110

Rovt pod Menino (pronounced [ˈɾoːu̯t pɔd mɛˈniːnɔ]) is a dispersed settlement in the hills south of Šmartno ob Dreti in the Municipality of Nazarje in Slovenia. The area belongs to the traditional region of Styria and is now included in the Savinja Statistical Region.

== Name ==
The name of the settlement was changed from Sveti Jošt (literally, 'Saint Jodocus') to Rovte pri Nazarjih (literally, 'clearing near Nazarje') in 1955. The name was changed on the basis of the 1948 Law on Names of Settlements and Designations of Squares, Streets, and Buildings as part of efforts by Slovenia's postwar communist government to remove religious elements from toponyms. The name of the settlement was changed again from Rovte pri Nazarjih to Rovt pod Menino in 1963.

== Churches ==
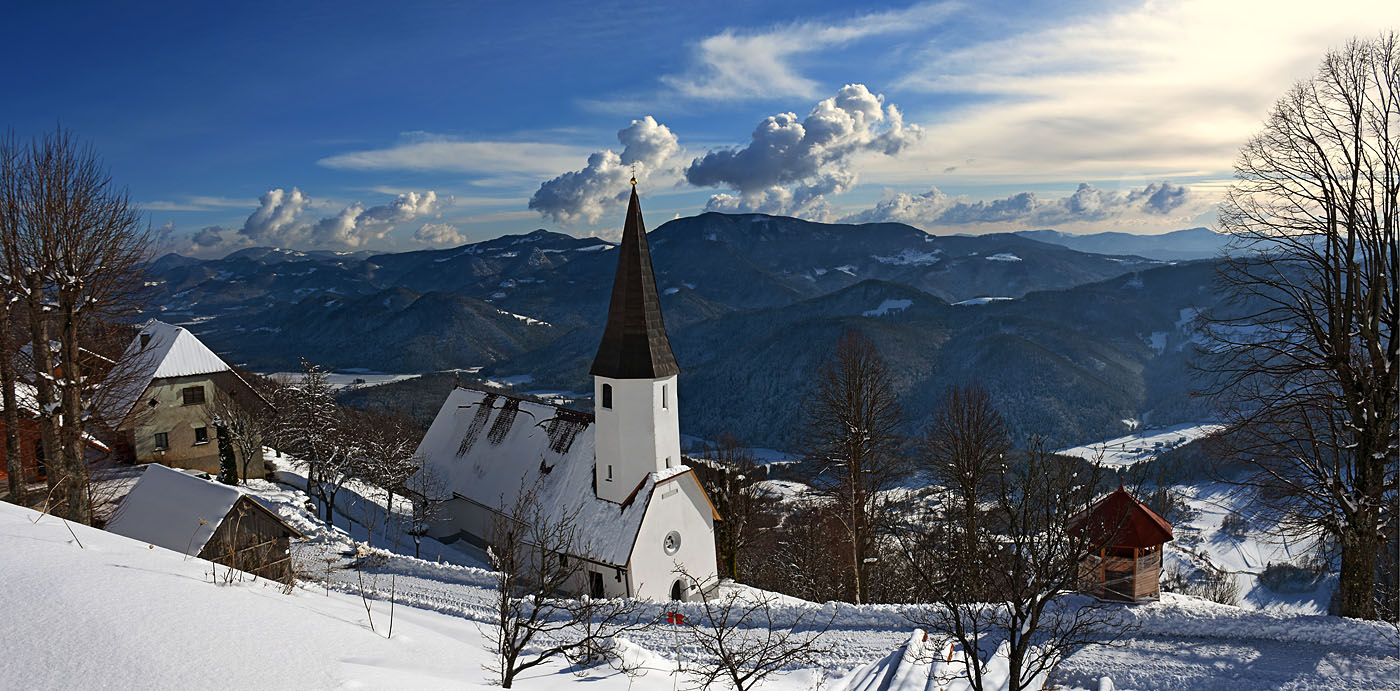
Saint Josse's Church

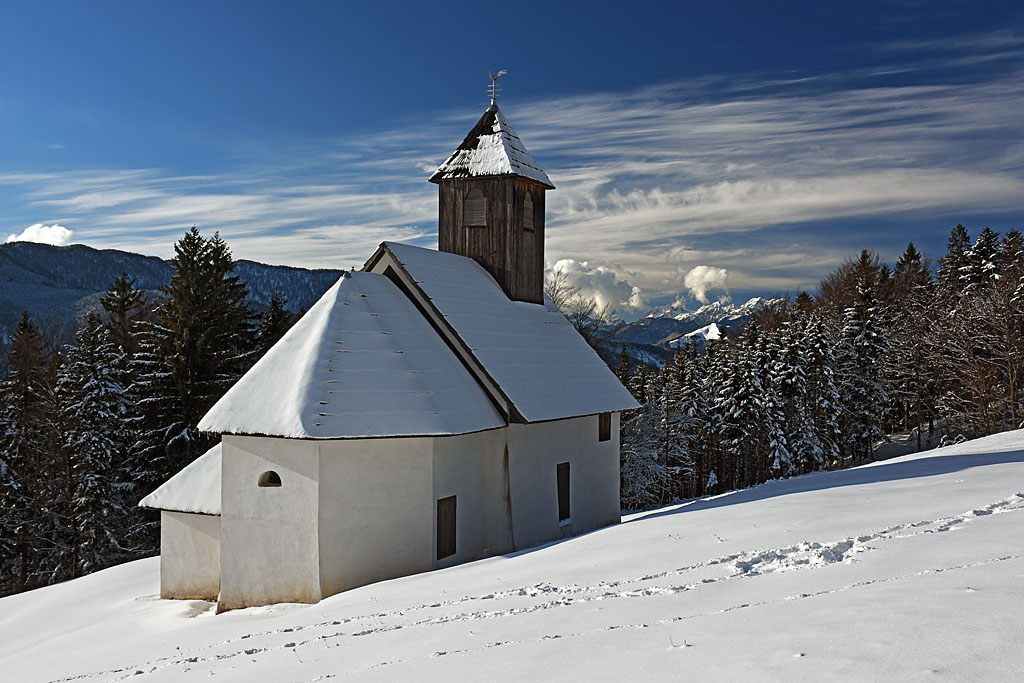
Saints Gervasius and Protasius Church

Churches

The local church built on an isolated hill in the east of the settlement, is dedicated to Saint Josse and belongs to the Parish of Šmartno ob Dreti. It dates to the late 13th and early 14th centuries with some later additions. There is a second church close by. It is dedicated to Saints Gervasius and Protasius.
