= Okrog pri Motniku =

Okrog pri Motniku Spodnji Okrog (1952–1955)
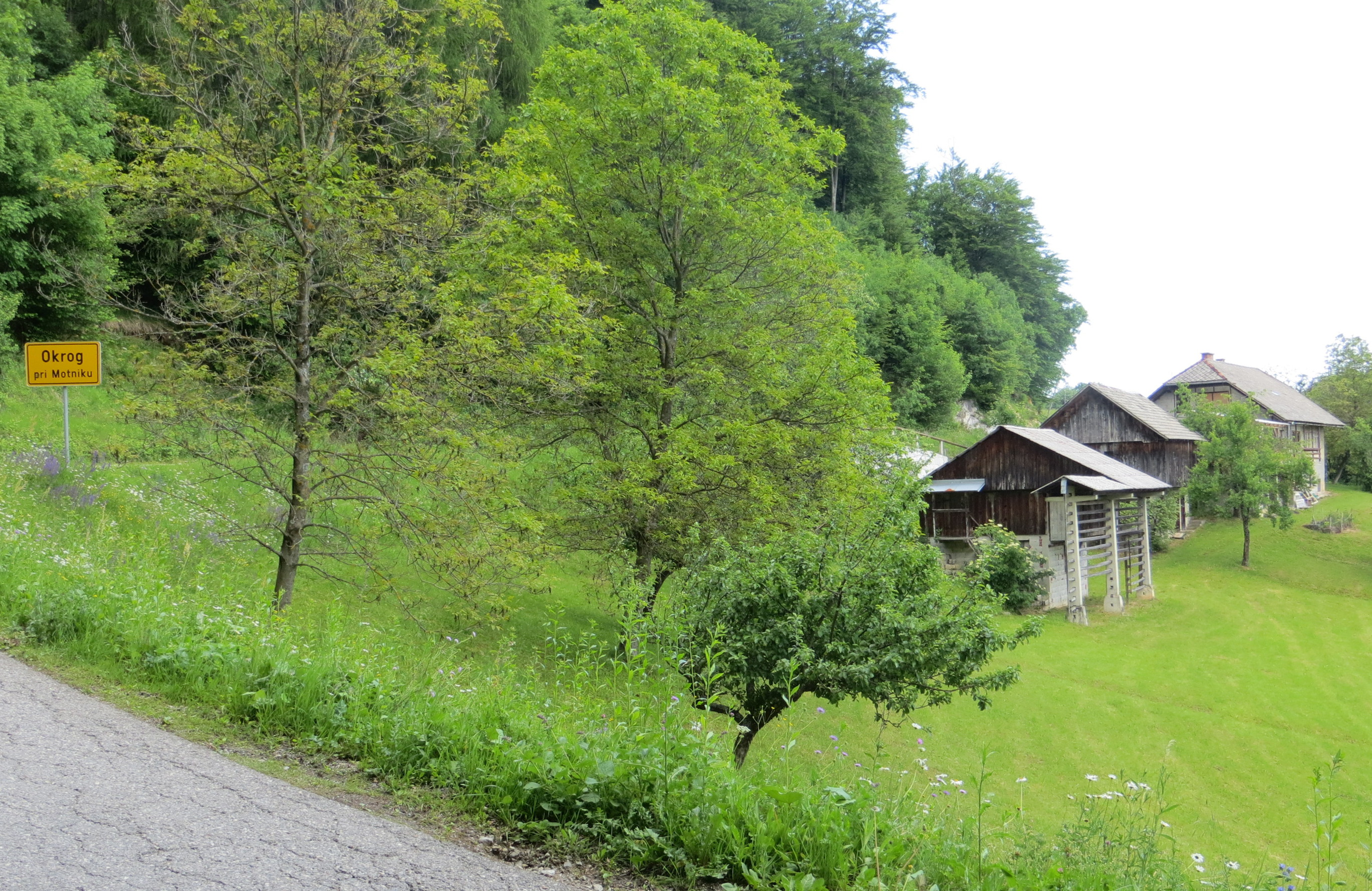

- Location in Slovenia
- Coordinates: 46°13′38.4″N 14°49′59.63″E
- Country: Slovenia
- Traditional region: Upper Carniola
- Statistical region: Central Slovenia
- Municipality: Kamnik

Area
  - Total: 9.85 km^{2} (3.80 sq mi)
- Elevation: 783.8 m (2,572 ft)

Population (2002)
  - Total: 61

Okrog pri Motniku (pronounced [ɔˈkɾoːk pɾi mɔˈtniːku]) is a small settlement in the Municipality of Kamnik in the Upper Carniola region of Slovenia.

== Name ==
In 1952, the three former villages of Peteržilje, Spodnji Okrog, and Zgornji Okrog were combined into a single village named Spodnji Okrog. In 1955, the name of the settlement was changed from Spodnji Okrog to Okrog pri Motniku.

== Notable people ==
Notable people that were born in Okrog pri Motniku include:

- Andrej Volkar (1847–1930), lawyer
