= Menina Pasture Plateau =

Coordinates: 46°15′13″N 14°47′26″E

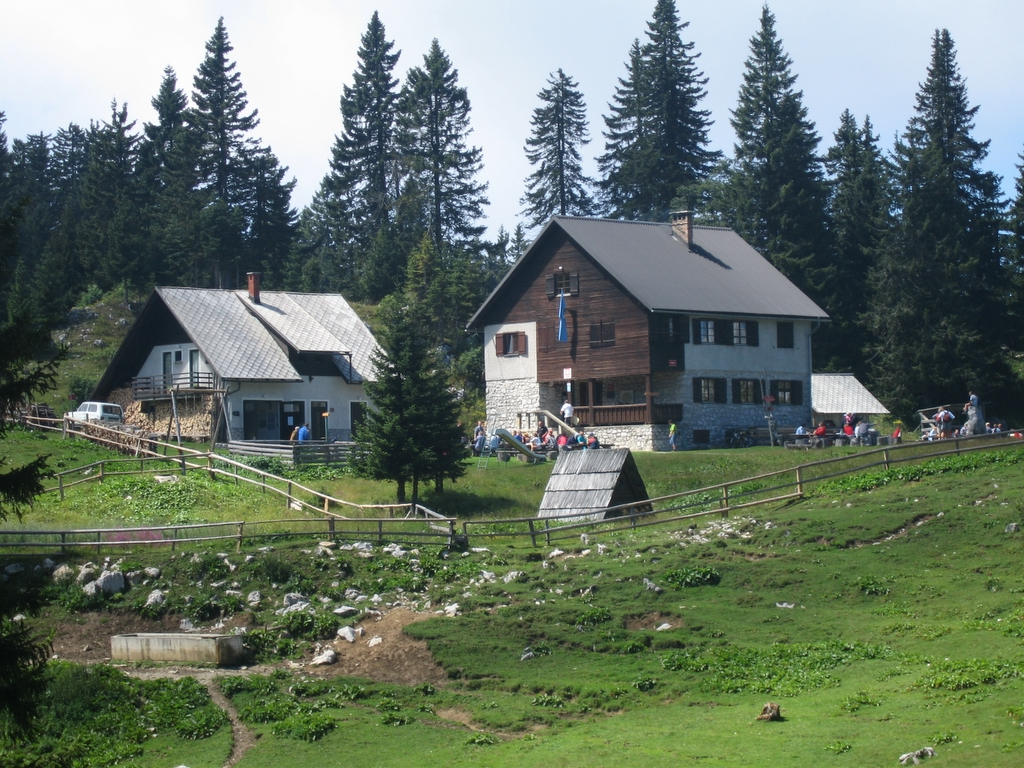
The Menina Pasture Lodge

The Menina Pasture Plateau (Slovene: Menina planina) is a pre-Alpine karst plateau in Slovenia.

== Geography ==
The plateau stands at an elevation between 1,200 and 1,450 meters (3,940 and 4,760 feet) in the Kamnik–Savinja Alps. It is located between the Dreta Valley to the north, the Tuhinj Valley and Motnik Valley to the south, the Črnivec Pass to the west, and the Lipa Pass and Dobrovlje Plateau to the east. The plateau is approximately 20 kilometers (12 mi) from east to west, and approximately 10 kilometers (6.2 mi) from north to south. The highest point on the plateau is Mount Vidovnik (1,508 meters or 4,948 feet), where there is also a lookout tower, about a 15-minute walk from the Menina Pasture Lodge (Slovene: Dom na Menini planini; 1,508 meters or 4,948 feet).

== Name ==
The plateau was attested in written sources in 1424 as Menino, and as Minitza in 1500. The name is believed to derive from a possessive form of the Slavic personal name *Měna. It is also possible, but less likely, that the name comes from *Mejnina planota 'border plateau', from the common noun meja 'border'. Another theory derives the name from the noun menih 'monk', in connection with the former Benedictine abbey in Gornji Grad.
