= Las Meninas (disambiguation) =

Las Meninas is a 1656 painting by Diego Velázquez. Las Meninas may also refer to:

- Las Meninas (Picasso), a series of 58 paintings by Pablo Picasso, painted in 1957
- Las Meninas (horse), an Irish Thoroughbred racehorse
- Las Meninas (film), a 2008 Ukrainian film
