= Črnivec Pass =

Mountain pass in Slovenia

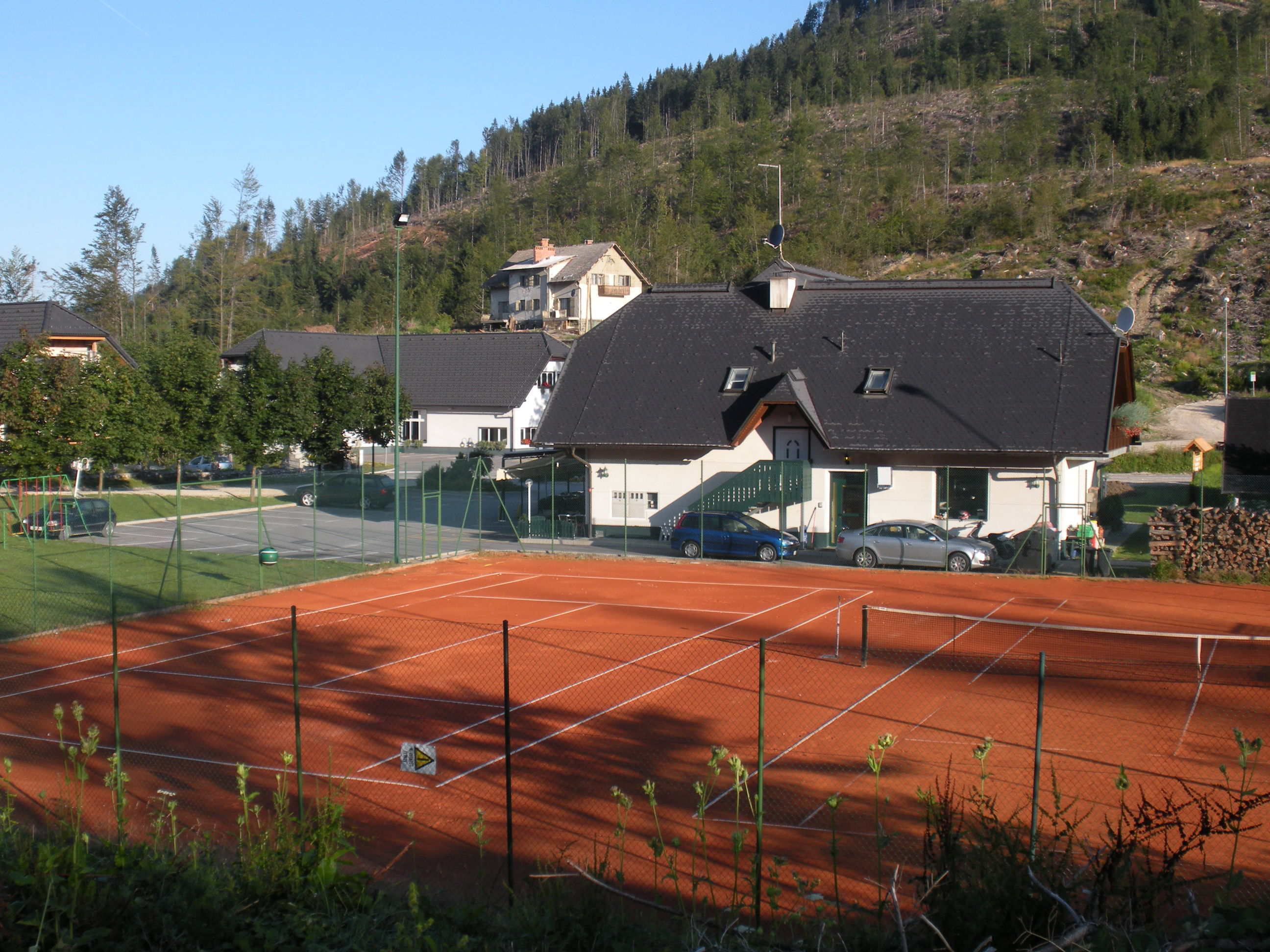
- Tourist facilities at the pass
- Interactive map of Črnivec Pass
- Elevation: 902 metres (2,959 ft)
- Traversed by: Local road from Kamnik to Gornji Grad

Third Approach
- Location: Slovenia
- Range: Alps
- Coordinates: 46°15′N 14°41′E

The Črnivec Pass (Slovene: prelaz Črnivec), usually just Črnivec, is a mountain pass in the Kamnik Alps that connects the traditional regions of Upper Carniola and Styria in Slovenia.

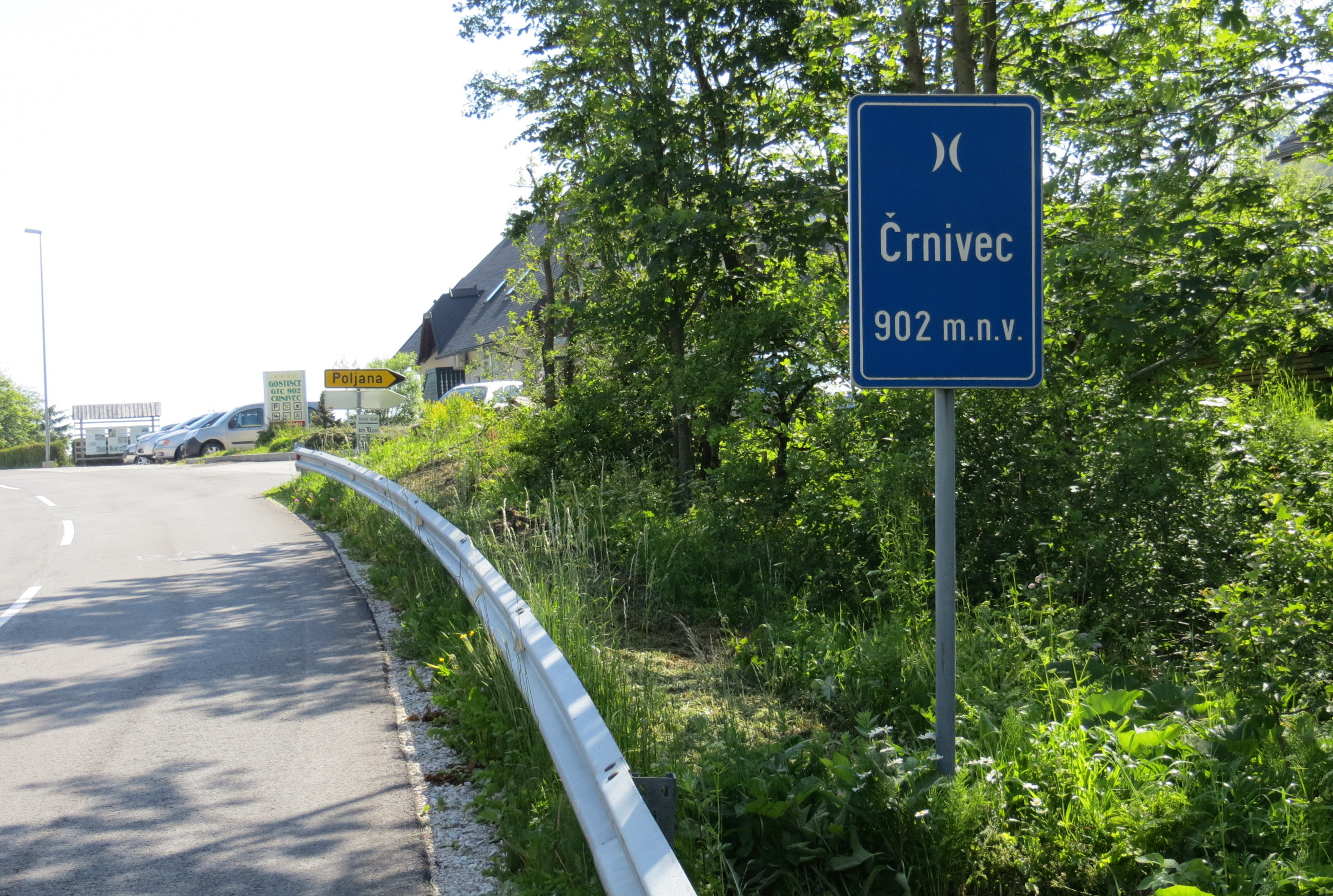
Approaching the pass from the west

It lies on the drainage divide between the Kamnik Bistrica and Dreta rivers. The road connecting Kamnik and Gornji Grad traverses the pass.
