= Šmartno ob Dreti =

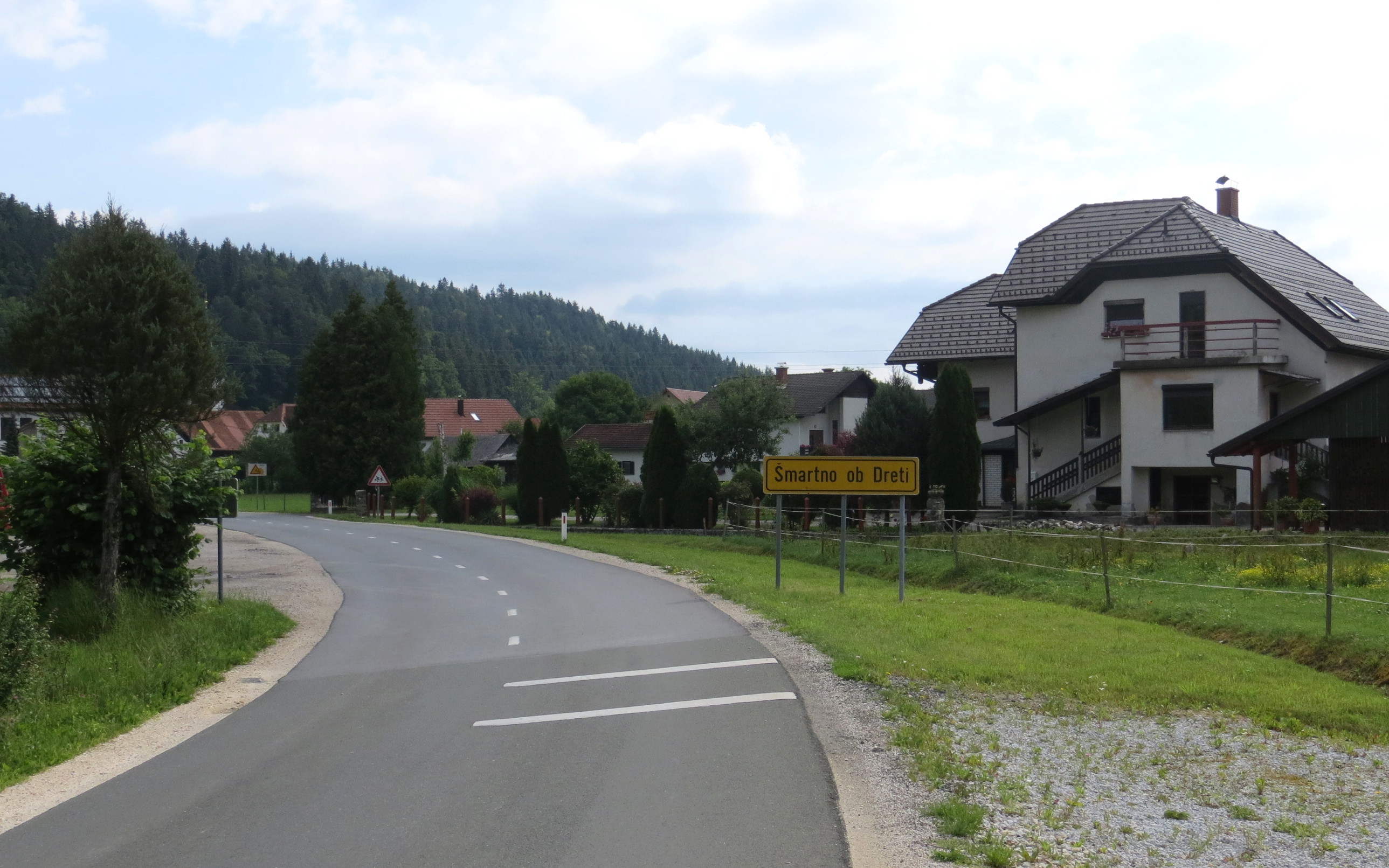

- Location in Slovenia
- Coordinates: 46°17′0.77″N 14°53′21.04″E
- Country: Slovenia
- Traditional region: Styria
- Statistical region: Savinja
- Municipality: Nazarje

Area
  - Total: 4.76 km^{2} (1.84 sq mi)
- Elevation: 376.7 m (1,236 ft)

Population (2002)
  - Total: 283

Šmartno ob Dreti (pronounced [ˈʃmaːɾtnɔ ɔb ˈdɾeːti]) is a village on the Dreta River in the Municipality of Nazarje in Slovenia. The area belongs to the traditional region of Styria and is now included in the Savinja Statistical Region.

== Church ==
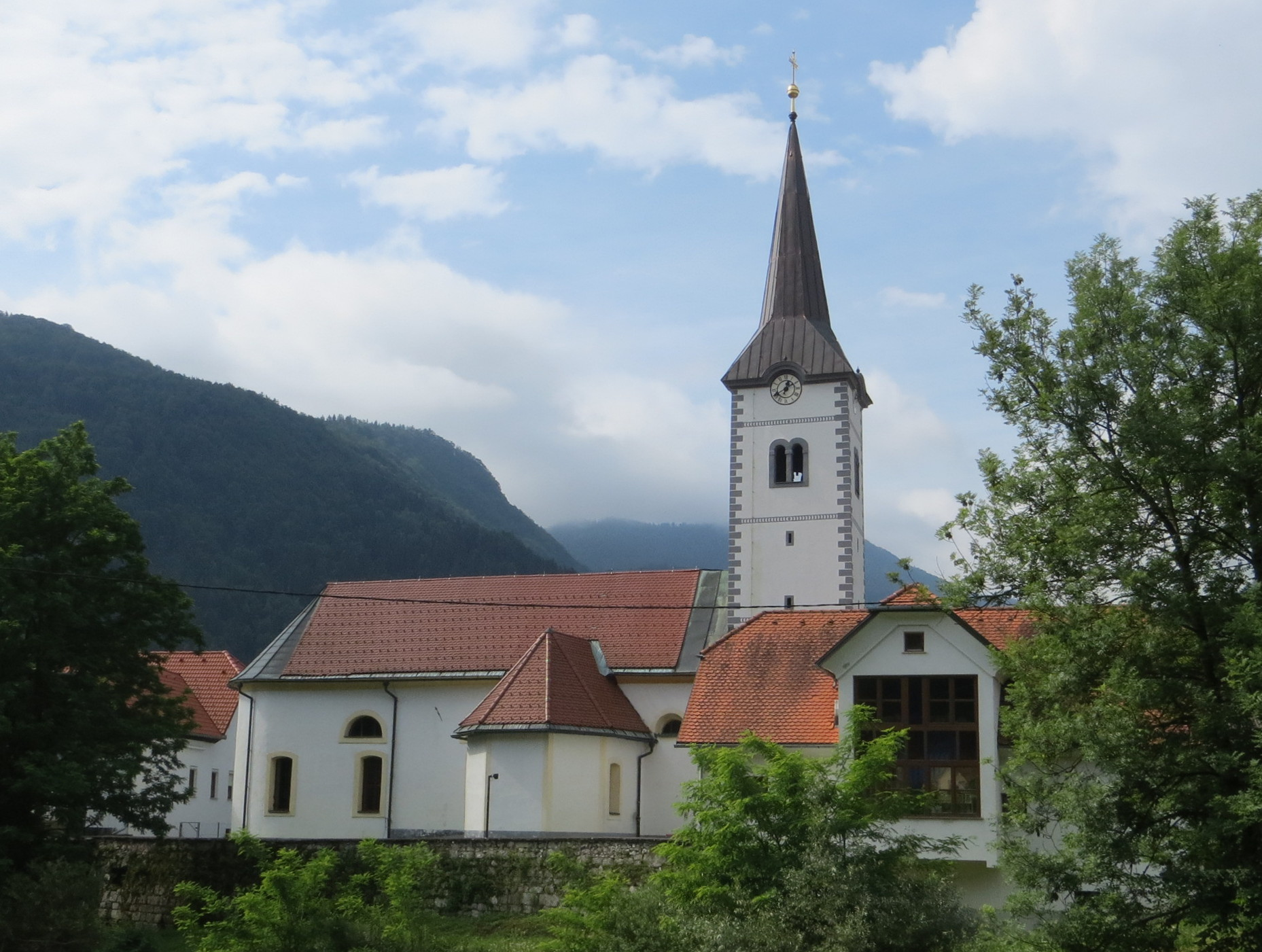
Saint Martin's Church

The local parish church in the centre of the village is dedicated to Saint Martin and belongs to the Roman Catholic Diocese of Celje. It was first mentioned in documents dating to 1426, but has numerous later additions.

== Gallery ==
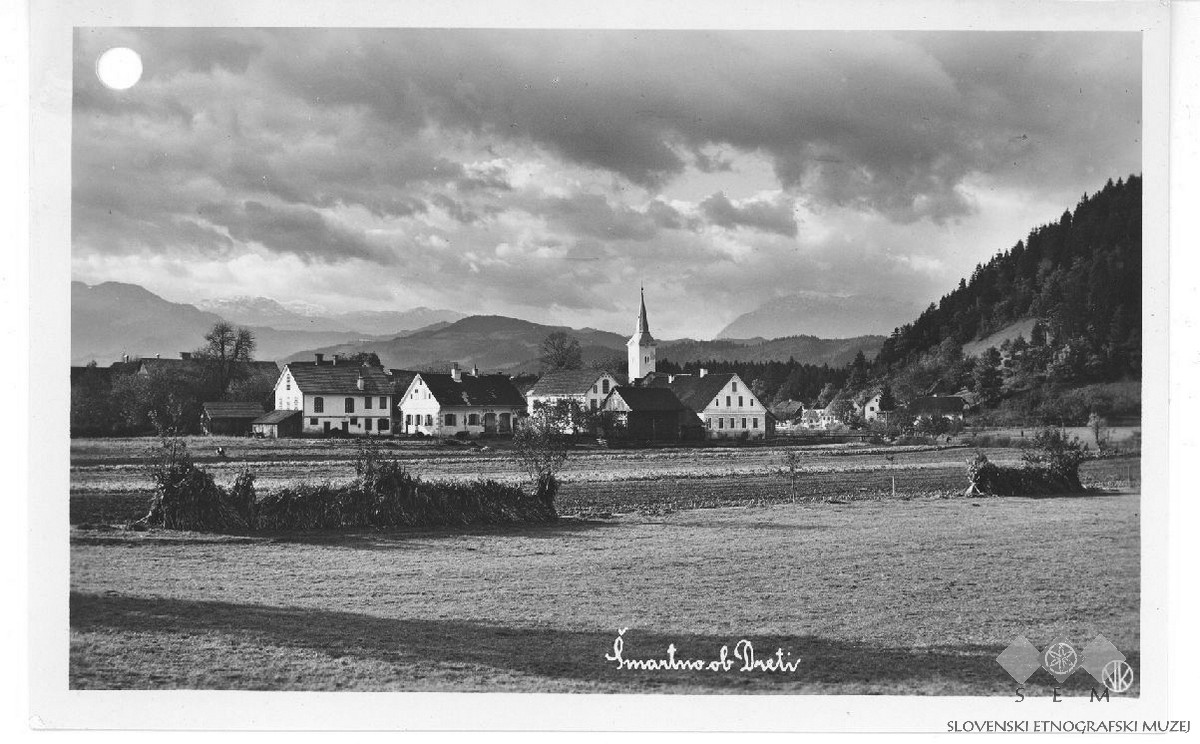
Historical postcard of Šmartno ob Dreti
