= Špitalič, Kamnik =

Špitalič
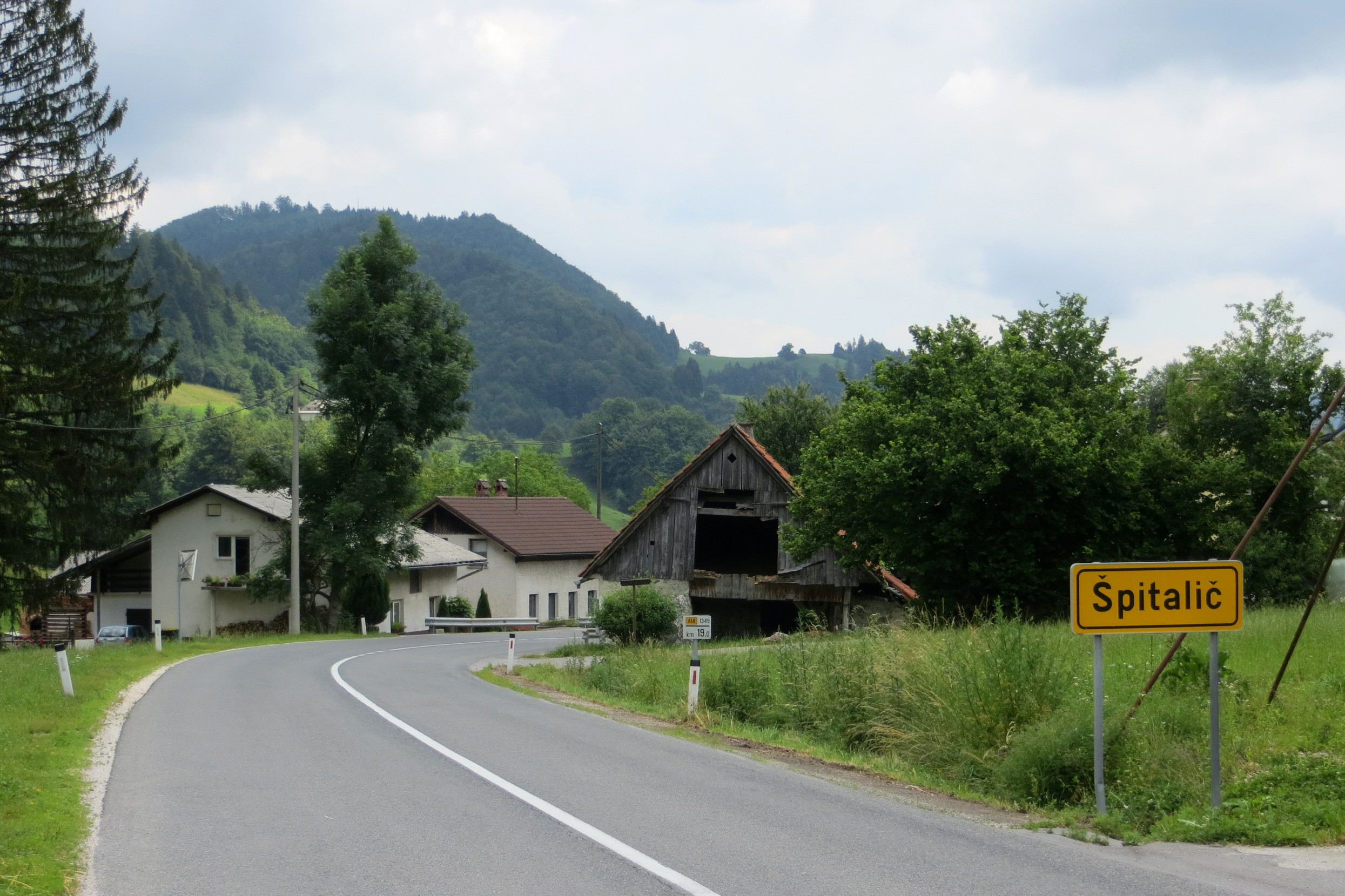

- Location in Slovenia
- Coordinates: 46°13′3.81″N 14°50′40.53″E
- Country: Slovenia
- Traditional region: Upper Carniola
- Statistical region: Central Slovenia
- Municipality: Kamnik

Area
  - Total: 7.82 km^{2} (3.02 sq mi)
- Elevation: 507.7 m (1,666 ft)

Population (2002)
  - Total: 191

Špitalič (pronounced [ʃpitaˈlitʃ]; German: Neuthal) is a village in the Municipality of Kamnik in the Upper Carniola region of Slovenia.

== Geography ==
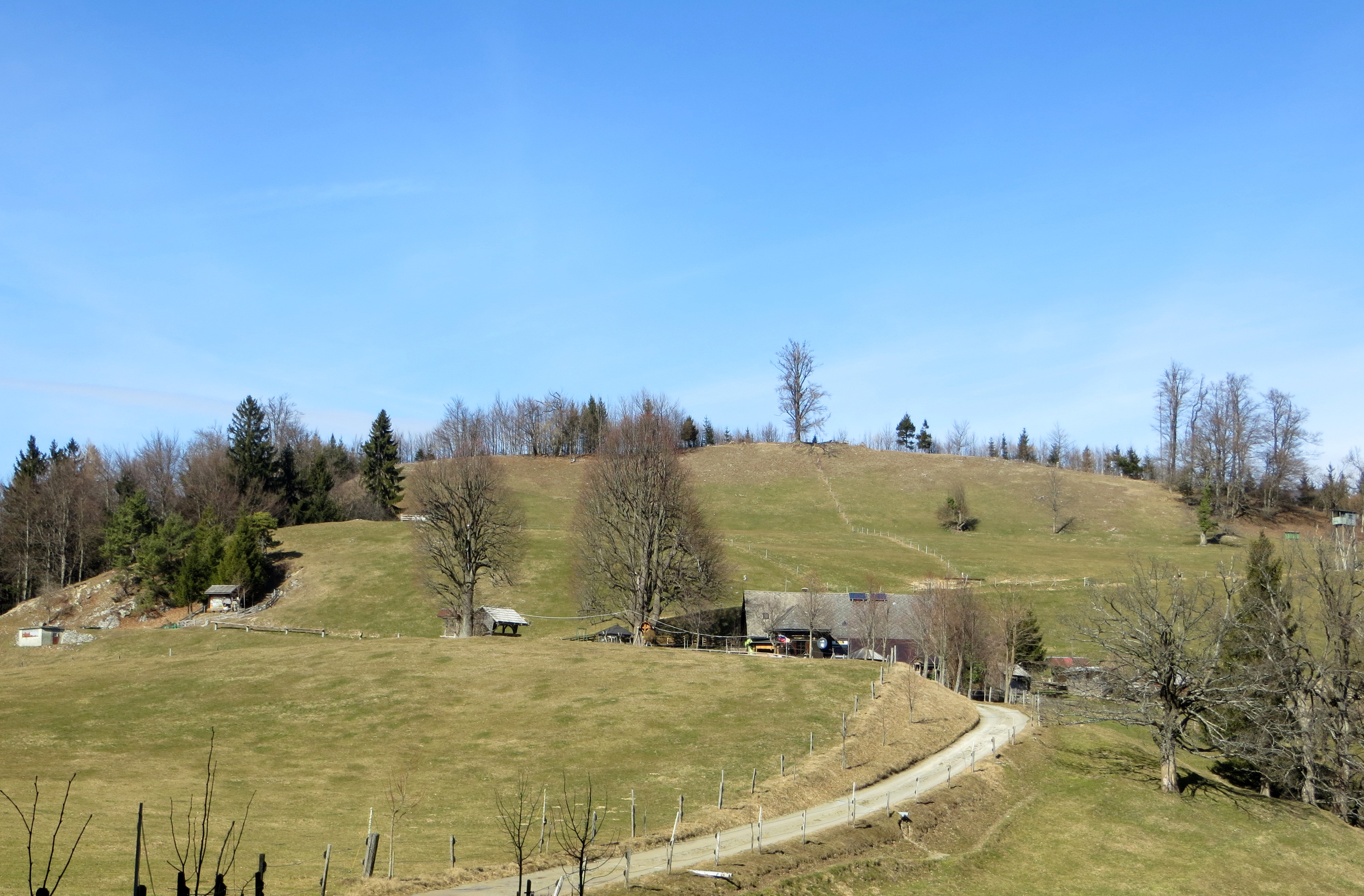
The Lipovec Pasture

The settlement is located in the Tuhinj Valley, on the road from Kamnik to Celje. It includes the hamlets of Jastroblje, Nova Reber (in older sources also Novo Rebro, German: Neureber), Dolina, Bukovšek, Zobava, Kisovšek, Podlipovec, Strmšek, Pustotnik, and Petrživec. The Lipovec Pasture lies 1.2 kilometers (0.75 mi) south of the village center on the Šipek Ridge.

== Name ==
Špitalič was attested in historical documents as Pochsruke in 1252, hospitale in Poxrukhe in 1255, and hospitale sancti Anthonii in Poxruk in 1261, among other names. The name Špitalič derives from German Spital 'hospice' (see History below).

== History ==
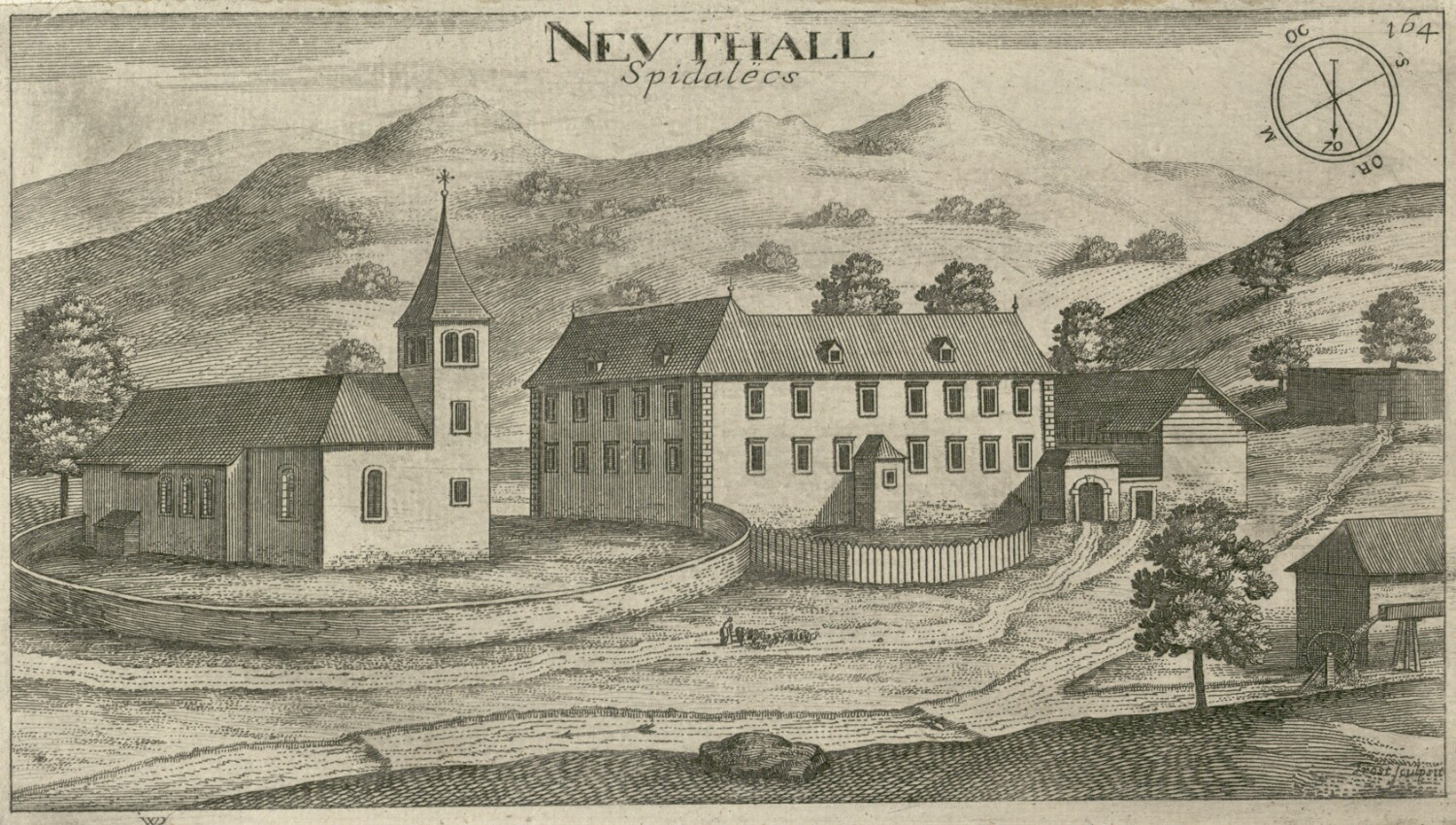
Neuthall, engraving by Johann Weikhard von Valvasor (1679)

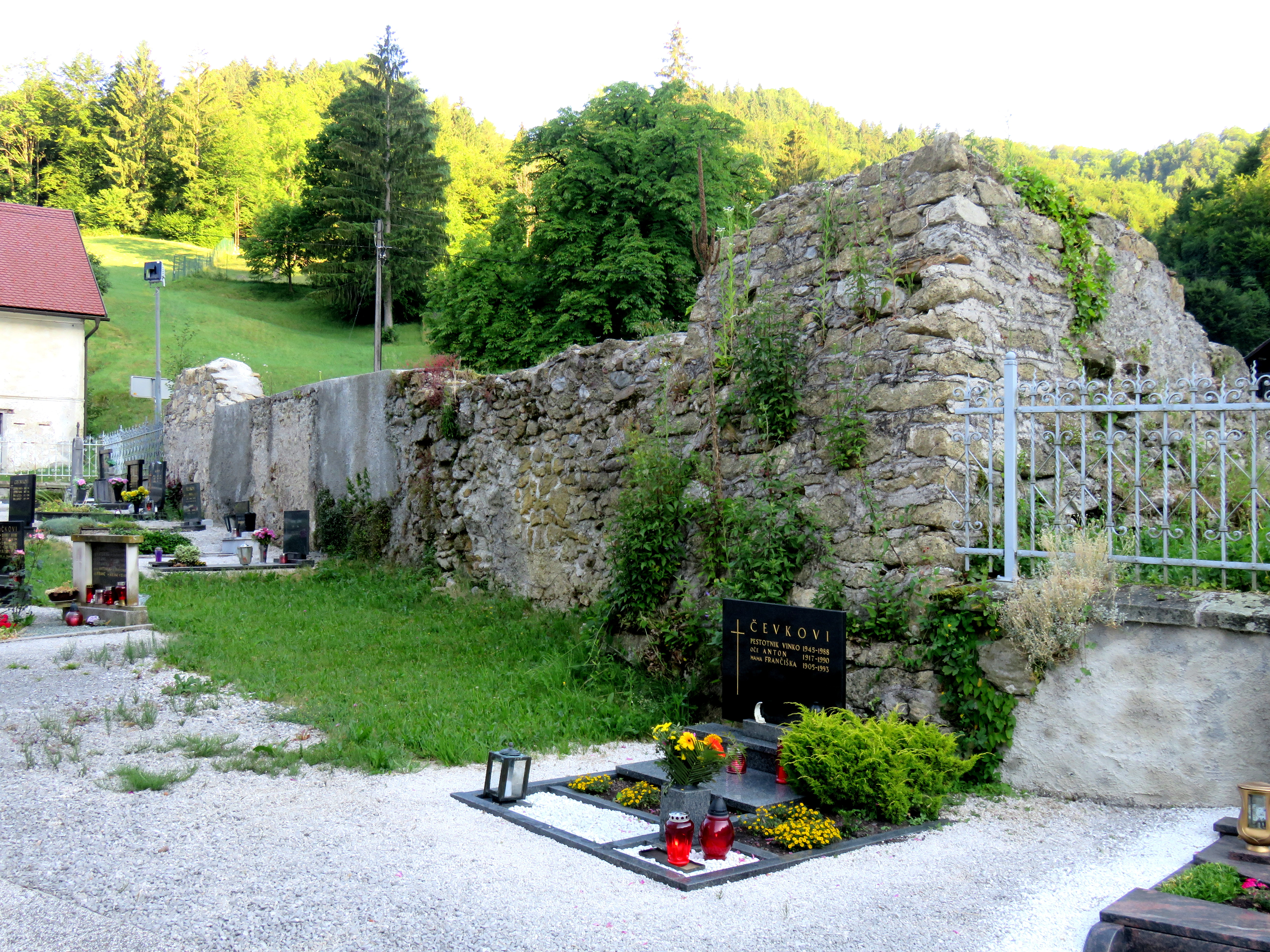
Mansion ruins viewed from the southeast

Špitalič (Neuthal) Mansion

Next to the church can be seen the ruins of what was the Špitalič (Neuthal) Mansion. Part of the Carniolan estates held by the Counts of Andechs, the structure was originally a hospice offering shelter to the many travelers passing through the valley. It was built by the Andechs margrave Henry II of Istria about 1228, passing to Viktring Abbey circa 1251. It was sold and converted into a mansion in 1608 and subsequently rebuilt a number of times. The mansion was burned by the Yugoslav Partisans in January 1945.

== Church ==
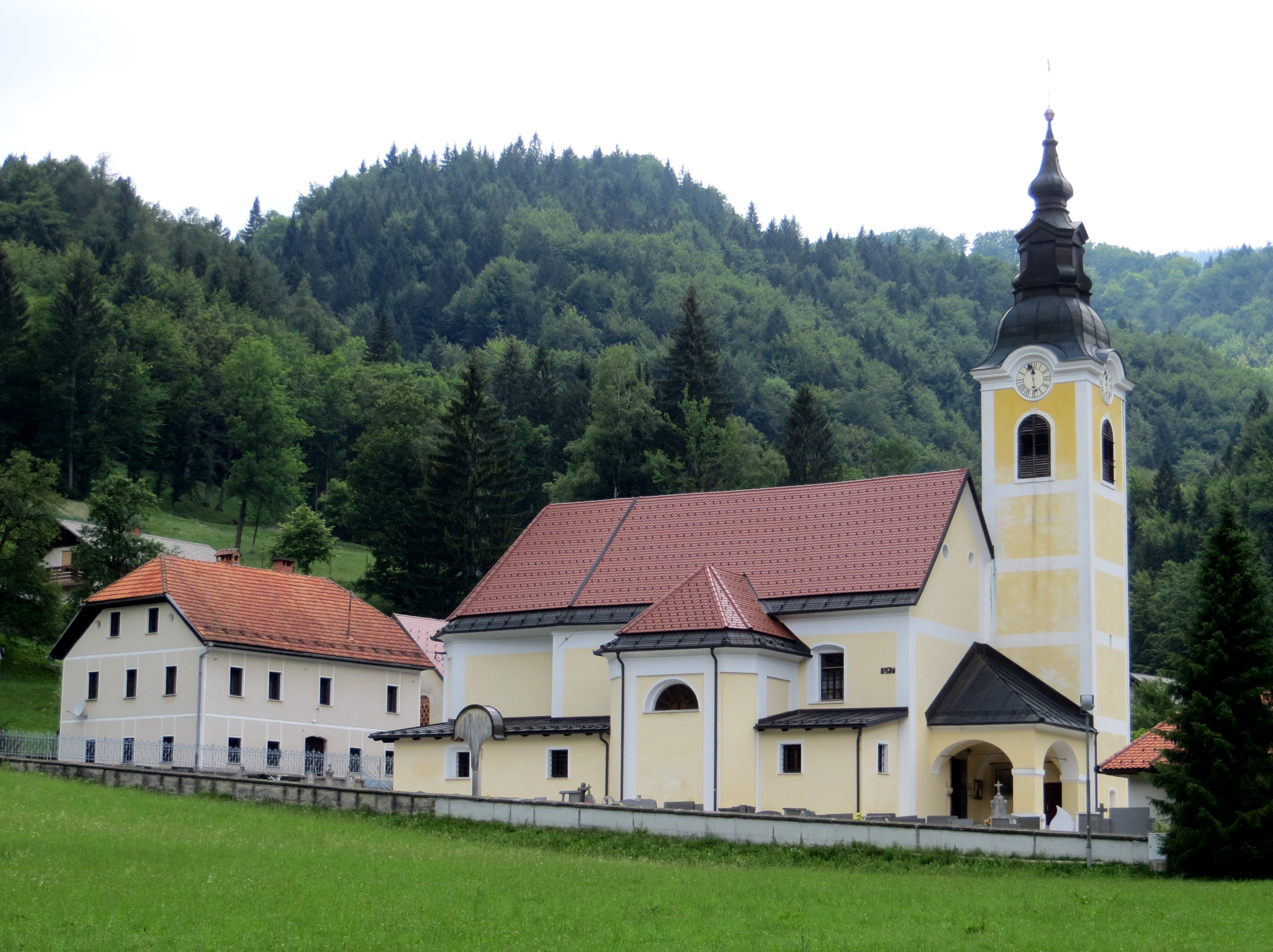
Saint Anthony the Hermit Church

The church in the village is dedicated to Saint Anthony the Hermit and was originally built in the 13th century, but renovated in the 19th century in a Baroque style.
