= Nazarje =

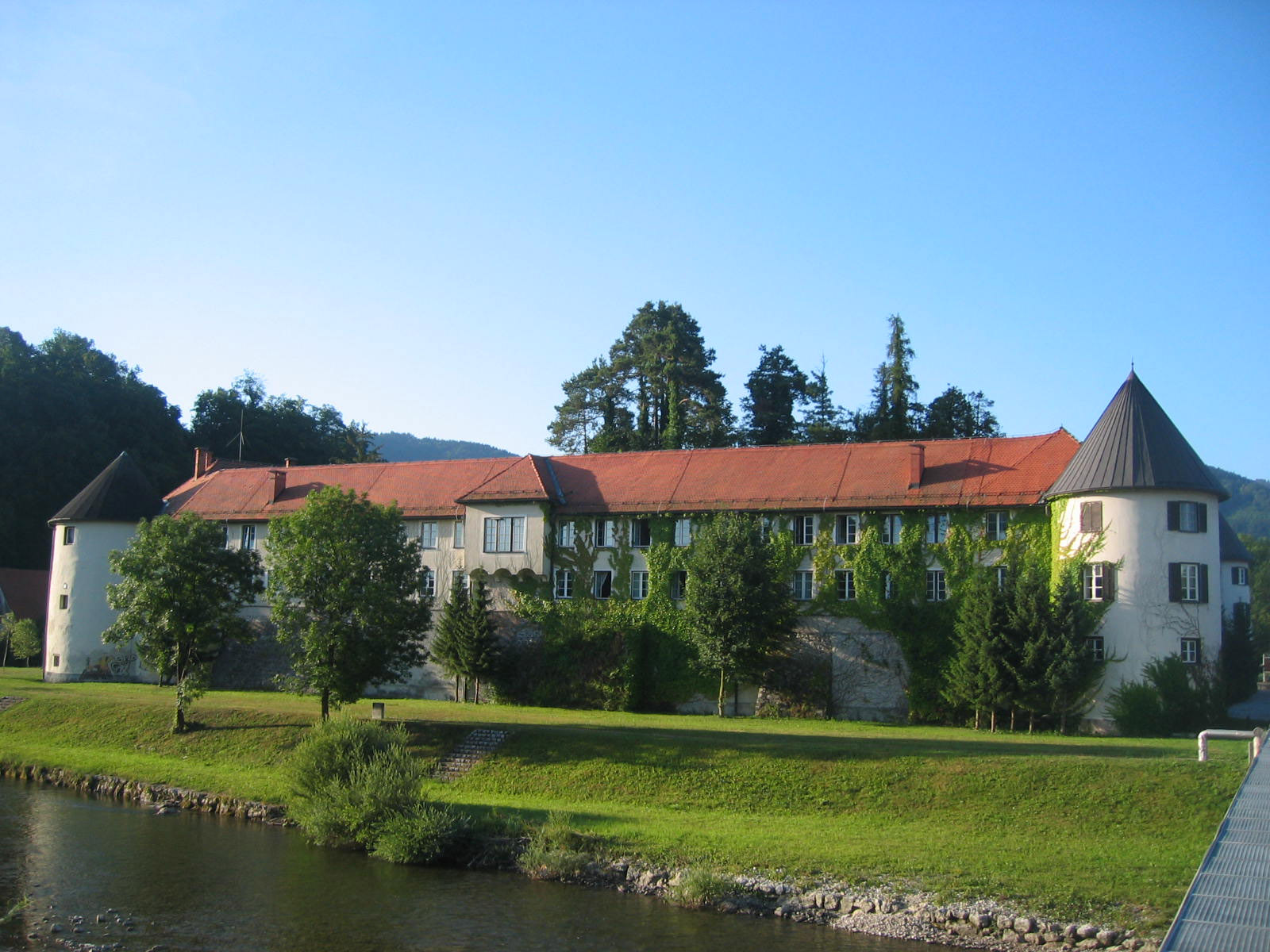
- Vrbovec Mansion

- Location in Slovenia
- Coordinates: 46°19′12.75″N 14°57′11.26″E
- Country: Slovenia
- Traditional region: Styria
- Statistical region: Savinja
- Municipality: Nazarje

Area
  - Total: 0.9 km^{2} (0.35 sq mi)
- Elevation: 386.6 m (1,268 ft)

Population (2012)
  - Total: 880

Nazarje (pronounced [ˈnaːzaɾjɛ]) is a settlement at the confluence of the Savinja and Dreta rivers in northern Slovenia. It is the largest settlement and the centre of the Municipality of Nazarje. Traditionally it belongs to the region of Styria and is now included in the Savinja Statistical Region.

The settlement gets its name from the monastic church dedicated to Mary of Nazareth. Right next to it is the 17th-century Franciscan monastery. Close by is Vrbovec Castle, originally a 12th-century building with 16th-century adaptations. It was badly damaged by fire in the Second World War. It was restored between 1988 and 1992 by the local forestry association and now houses a forestry and woodworking museum.
