= Dreta =

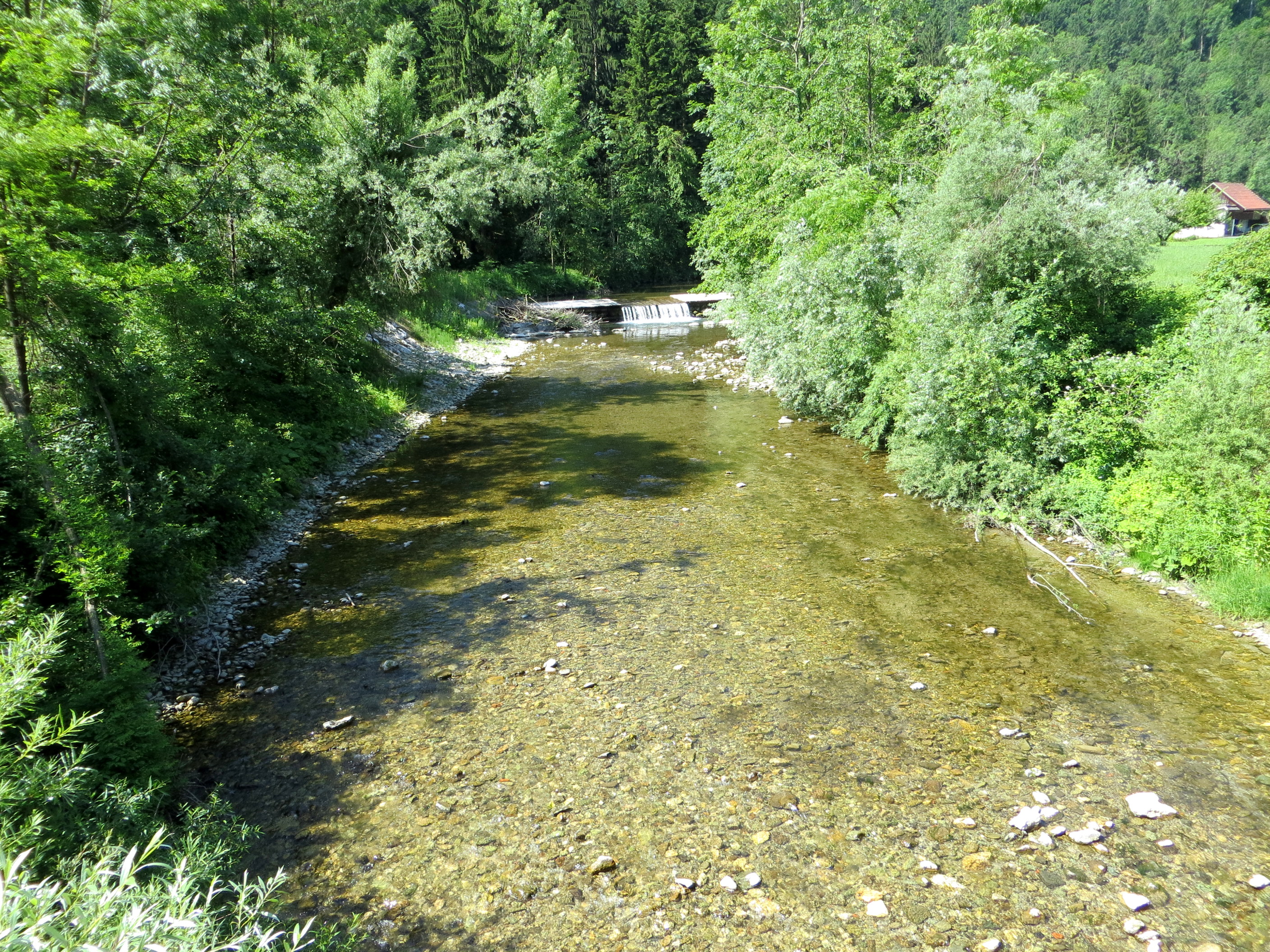
- The Dreta west of Bočna

Location
- Country: Slovenia

Physical characteristics
- Source
  - elevation: 1,100 m (3,600 ft)
- Mouth
  - location: Savinja
  - coordinates: 46.3212°N 14.9519°E
  - elevation: 339 m (1,112 ft)
- Length: 29 km (18 mi)
- Basin size: 126 km^{2} (49 sq mi)

Basin features
- Progression: Savinja→ Sava→ Danube→ Black Sea

The Dreta (pronounced [ˈdɾeːta]) is a river in Styria, northeastern Slovenia. The river is 29 km (18 mi) long. Its source is near the Črnivec Pass in the Kamnik Alps. It flows through the town of Gornji Grad, Bočna, and Šmartno ob Dreti, and merges with the Savinja River in Nazarje. The Dreta Valley (Slovene: Zadrečka dolina) is named after the river.

== Name ==
The Dreta was attested in written sources in 1243 as super fluvio Driete (and as pey der Driet in 1340, Driete in 1430, and Trijet in 1524). The origin of the name is uncertain, but is likely connected with the Croatian hydronym Dretulja and the Slovak hydronym and place name Drietoma. It may be derived from the Indo-European root *dreu̯- 'to flow'.
