= Črnuče District =

Črnuče District Četrtna skupnost Črnuče
- District
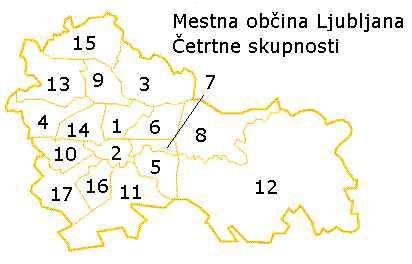
- Map of districts in Ljubljana. The Črnuče District is number 3.

- Location in Slovenia
- Coordinates: 46°6′21″N 14°31′53″E
- Country: Slovenia
- Traditional region: Upper Carniola
- Statistical region: Central Slovenia
- Municipality: Ljubljana

Area
  - Total: 18.10 km^{2} (6.99 sq mi)

Population (2014)
  - Total: 11,495

The Črnuče District (pronounced [tʃəɾˈnuːtʃɛ]; Slovene: Četrtna skupnost Črnuče), or simply Črnuče, is a district (mestna četrt) of the City Municipality of Ljubljana in the northern part of Ljubljana, the capital of Slovenia. It is named after the former town of Črnuče.

== Geography ==
The Črnuče District is bounded on the south by the Sava River, on the west by a line east of Spodnje Gameljne and Rašica; on the north by a line south of Trzin and Dragomelj; and on the east by a line just east of the A1 Freeway. The district includes the former settlements of Brod, Črnuče, Dobrava pri Črnučah, Gmajna, Ježa, Nadgorica, Podgorica pri Črnučah, and Šentjakob ob Savi. It is part of the traditional region of Upper Carniola and is now included with the rest of the municipality in the Central Slovenia Statistical Region.

== Attractions and facilities ==
=== Ludus Beach Park ===
Ludus Beach Park has four indoor beach volleyball courts. It also has seven outdoor courts, six tennis courts, three padel courts, a football court, a basketball court, a pump-track and a playground.

=== Pisarna Coworking Space ===
Pisarna (Slovene for 'office') is a co-working office. It is in a converted warehouse with tall ceilings and skylights where freelancers, digital nomads, and small businesses can work. Its workspace options include individual desks, hot desks, and small offices.
