= Podgorica (disambiguation) =

Podgorica is the capital and largest city of Montenegro.

Podgorica (Cyrillic: Подгорица) may also refer to:

- Podgorica Capital City
- Podgorica Airport, an airport on territory of the Podgorica Capital City

== Places ==
=== Slovenia ===
- Podgorica, Dobrepolje, a village in the municipality of Dobrepolje
- Podgorica, Sevnica, a village in the municipality of Sevnica
- Podgorica pri Pečah, a village in the municipality of Moravče
- Podgorica pri Podtaboru, a village in the municipality of Grosuplje
- Podgorica pri Šmarju, a village in the municipality of Grosuplje
- Podgorica pri Črnučah, a locality of Ljubljana

=== Serbia / Kosovo ===
- Podgorica, the old name for Podgorce, a village in the municipality of Vitina

== See also ==
- Podgoritsa, Bulgaria, a village in the municipality of Targovishte, Bulgaria
- Podgorač, a village and a municipality in Osijek-Baranja County, Croatia
- Podgorac (disambiguation)
- Podgorci (disambiguation)
- Podgorce, a village in the municipality of Vitina, Serbia / Kosovo
