= Gmajna =

Gmajna may refer to:

- Gmajna, Ivančna Gorica, a formerly independent settlement in the Municipality of Ivančna Gorica in central Slovenia
- Gmajna, Krško, a settlement in the Municipality of Krško in eastern Slovenia
- Gmajna (Ljubljana), a formerly independent settlement in the City Municipality of Ljubljana in central Slovenia
- Gmajna, Slovenj Gradec, a dispersed settlement in the City Municipality of Slovenj Gradec in northern Slovenia

== See also ==
- Gmajna Tree Nursery Mass Grave, in Stari Trg, Slovenj Gradec, Slovenia
