= Podgorac =

Podgorac may refer to:

- Podgorac (Boljevac), a small town in the municipality of Boljevac in the Zaječar District, Serbia
- Podgorac (Ražanj), a village in the municipality of Ražanj in the Nišava District, Serbia

== See also ==
- Podgorač, a village and a municipality in Osijek-Baranja County, Croatia
- Podgorci (disambiguation)
- Podgorce, a village in the municipality of Vitina, Kosovo-Pomoravlje District, Kosovo and Metohija, Serbia / a village in the municipality of Vitina, District of Gjilan, Kosovo
- Podgorica (disambiguation)
