= Soteska =

Soteska may refer to several places in Slovenia:

- Soteska, Dolenjske Toplice, a settlement in the Municipality of Dolenjske Toplice
- Soteska, Kamnik, a settlement in the Municipality of Kamnik
- Soteska, Ljubljana, a former village in central Slovenia, now part of the city of Ljubljana
- Soteska pri Moravčah, a settlement in the Municipality of Moravče
