= Dobrava pri Črnučah =

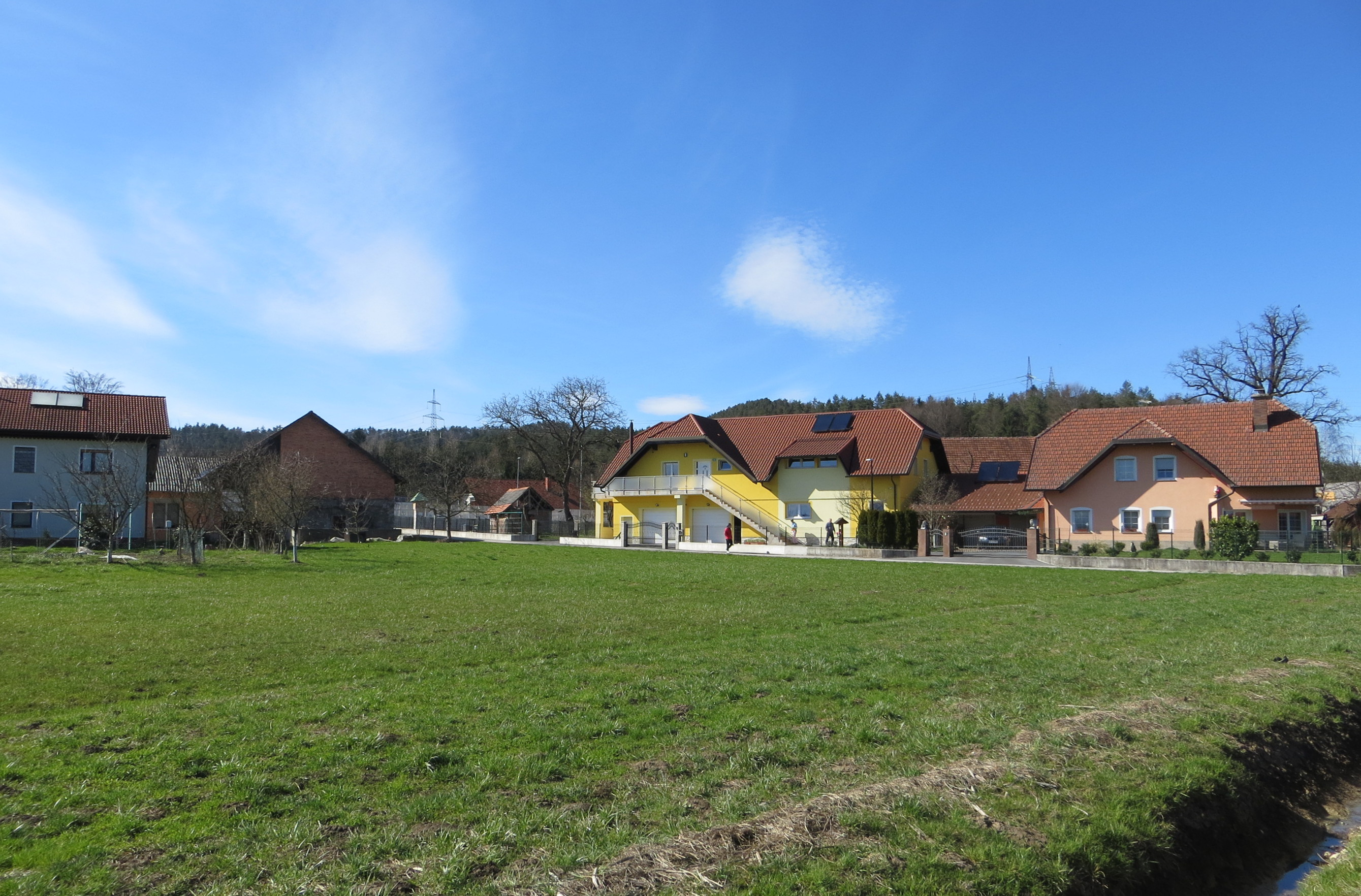

- Location in Slovenia
- Coordinates: 46°6′42.32″N 14°32′53.39″E
- Country: Slovenia
- Traditional region: Upper Carniola
- Statistical region: Central Slovenia
- Municipality: Ljubljana
- Elevation: 300 m (980 ft)

Dobrava pri Črnučah (pronounced [dɔˈbɾaːʋa pɾi tʃəɾˈnuːtʃax]; German: Dobrawa) is a formerly independent settlement in the northern part of the capital Ljubljana in central Slovenia. It is a dispersed settlement on both sides of the road from Ljubljana to Domžale. It is part of the traditional region of Upper Carniola and is now included with the rest of the municipality in the Central Slovenia Statistical Region.

== Geography ==
Big Hill (Slovene: Visoki hrib, also known as Kob, 391 m) rises west of the settlement. It is the source of Dobravščica Creek, a tributary of the Pšata River. The soil is loamy, and is swampy in a part of the settlement known as Blatnice (from Slovene blato 'mud'). There are fields east of the settlement, in the direction of Dragomelj.

== Name ==
Dobrava pri Črnučah was attested in written sources in 1364 as Hard. The name Dobrava pri Črnučah means 'Dobrava near Črnuče'. The place name Dobrava is relatively frequent in Slovenia. It is derived from the Slovene common noun dobrava 'gently rolling partially wooded land' (and archaically 'woods, grove'). The name therefore refers to the local geography. In the past the German name was Dobrawa.

== History ==
Excavations for the railroad revealed wooden structures associated with a Roman road in the settlement, testifying to its long history. The excavations also yielded other finds from antiquity. In the past, a turn in the road to Trzin below Špruha Hill half a kilometer north of the village was notorious as a place where highwaymen would attack travelers. Many of the houses in the settlement were built after the Second World War. Dobrava pri Črnučah was annexed by the City of Ljubljana in 1979, ending its existence as an independent settlement.

== Notable people ==
Notable people that were born or lived in Dobrava pri Črnučah include:

- Janez Bizjak (a.k.a. Vid, 1911–1941), communist, Partisan, and People's Hero of Yugoslavia
- Maks Pečar (a.k.a. Črne or Andrejev, 1907–1941), communist, Partisan, and People's Hero of Yugoslavia
