= Vojni Dol =

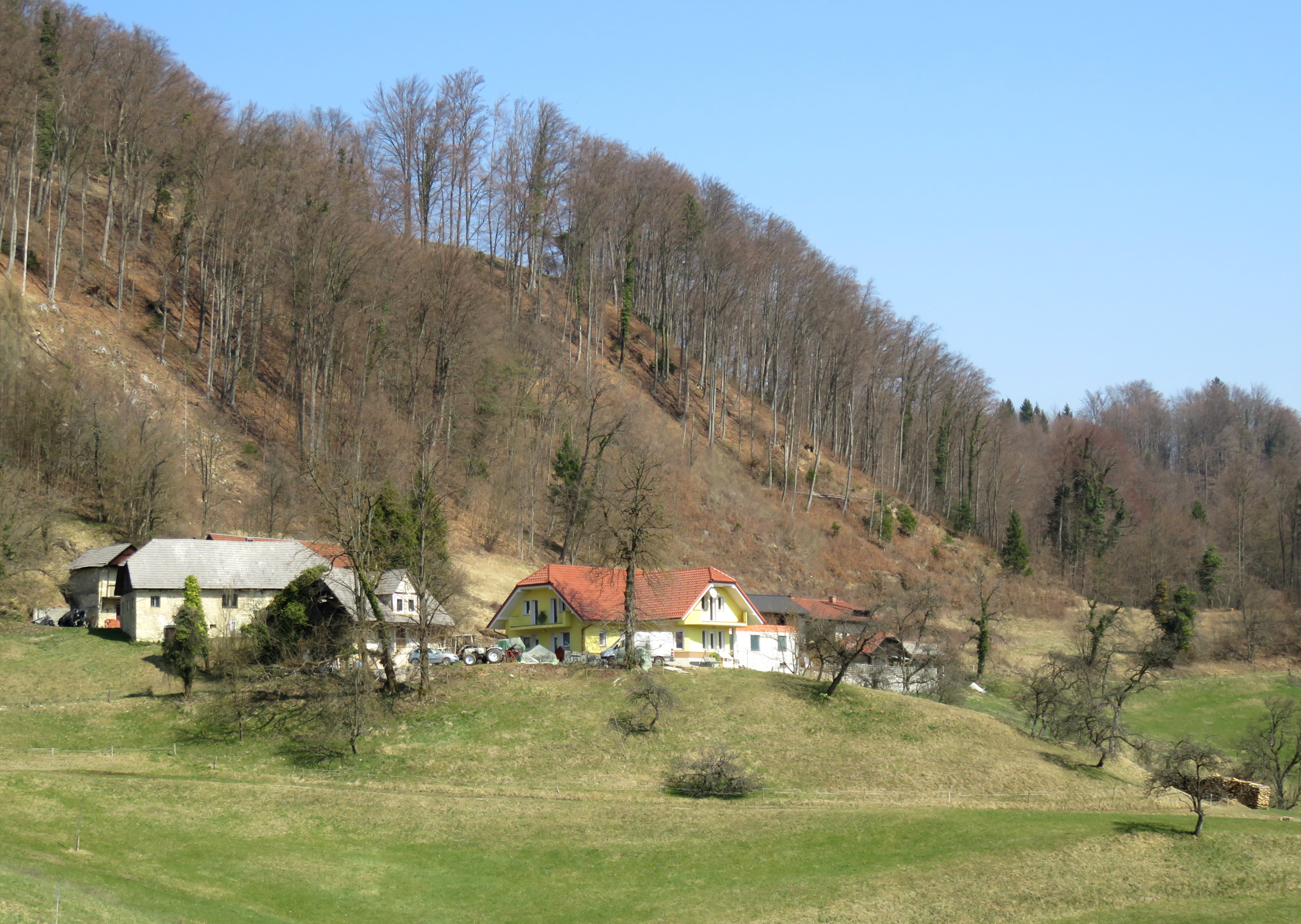

- Location in Slovenia
- Coordinates: 46°8′19″N 14°49′57″E
- Country: Slovenia
- Traditional region: Upper Carniola
- Statistical region: Central Slovenia
- Municipality: Moravče
- Elevation: 470 m (1,540 ft)

Vojni Dol (Slovene pronunciation: [ˈʋɔːi̯ni ˈdɔːu̯], in older sources Voljedol or Volovji Dol, German: Woljedol) is a former settlement in the Municipality of Moravče in central Slovenia. It is now part of the village of Podgorica pri Pečah. The area is part of the traditional region of Upper Carniola. The municipality is now included in the Central Slovenia Statistical Region.

== Geography ==
Vojni Dol lies in the eastern part of Podgorica pri Pečah, north of the main road from Moravče to Mlinše.

== History ==
Vojni Dol had a population of 33 living in five houses in 1880, and 49 living in eight houses in 1900. Vojni Dol was annexed by Podgorica pri Pečah in 1955, ending its existence as an independent settlement.
