= Poreber =

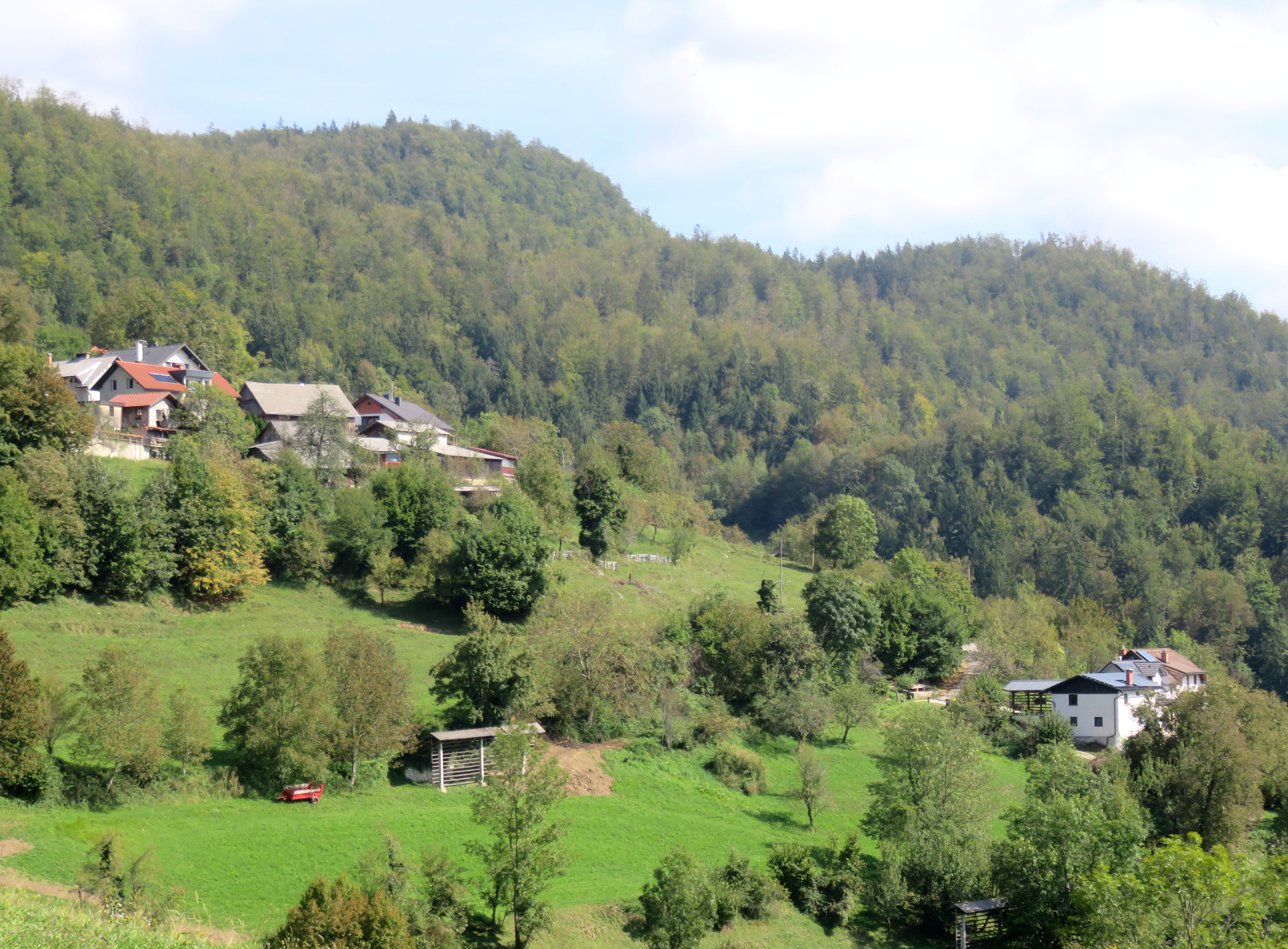

- Location in Slovenia
- Coordinates: 46°14′6.91″N 14°39′59.48″E
- Country: Slovenia
- Traditional region: Upper Carniola
- Statistical region: Central Slovenia
- Municipality: Kamnik

Area
  - Total: 0.85 km^{2} (0.33 sq mi)
- Elevation: 436.6 m (1,432 ft)

Population (2002)
  - Total: 160

Poreber (pronounced [ˈpoːɾɛbəɾ]) is a dispersed settlement in the Municipality of Kamnik in the Upper Carniola region of Slovenia.

== Geography ==
Poreber is a village composed of scattered farms between the Gozd Plateau (Slovene: Gojška planota) and Soteska in the Tuhinj Valley. Three of the farms belong to the hamlet of Kavran along the road into the Tuhinj Valley. Several smaller creeks join near the village to form Porebrščica Creek. There are meadows and high-quality fields on the steep sunny slopes in the village.

== History ==
Poreber was mentioned in written sources in 1209. According to the land registry for the domain of Gornji Grad in 1426, the village was an administrative seat for 15 surrounding villages. A water main was installed in the village in 1902, leading from a catchwater below Vovar Hill (940 meters or 3,080 feet) to the northwest.
