= Muzga, Moravče =

Muzga
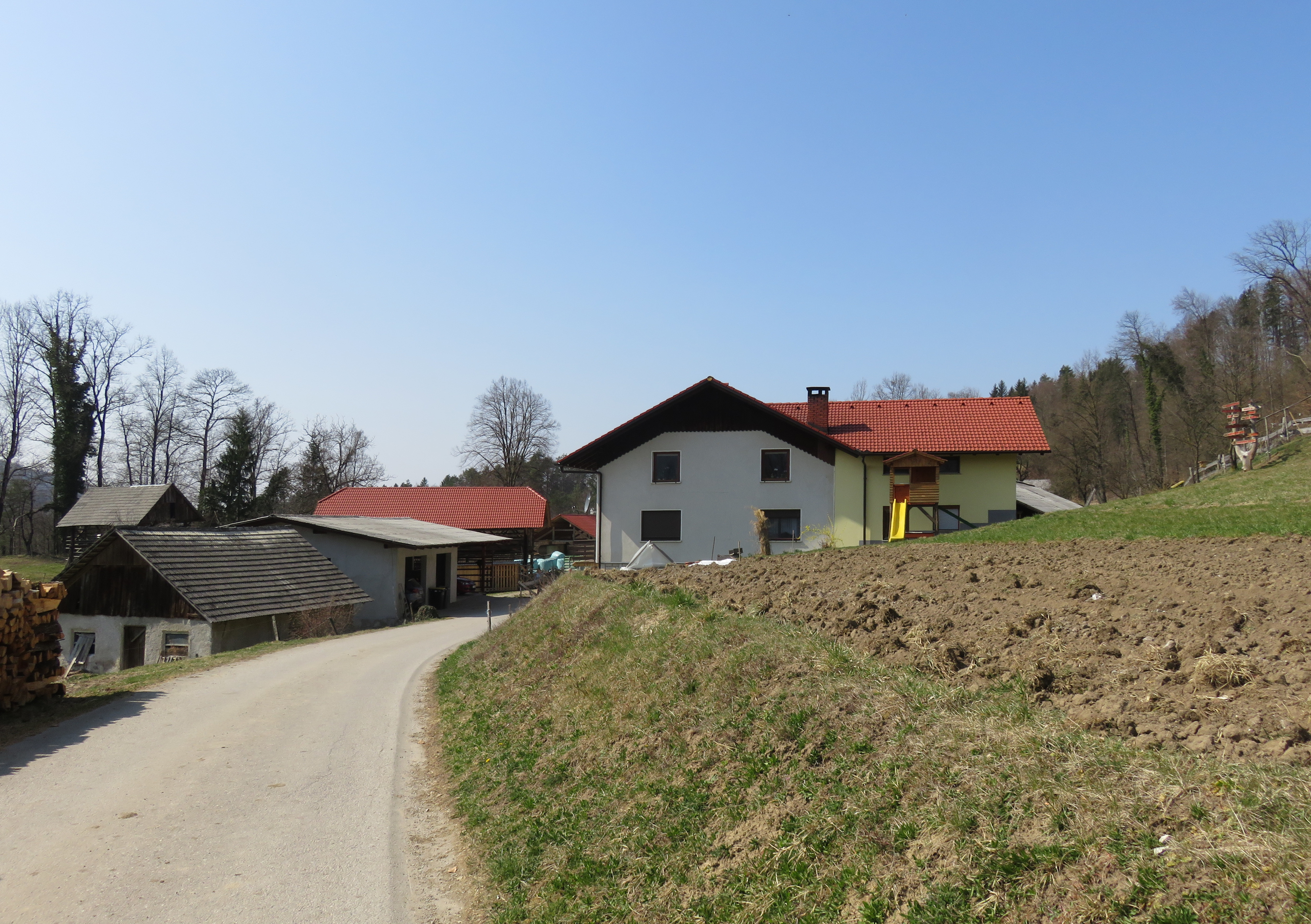

- Location in Slovenia
- Coordinates: 46°8′24″N 14°49′15″E
- Country: Slovenia
- Traditional region: Upper Carniola
- Statistical region: Central Slovenia
- Municipality: Moravče
- Elevation: 464 m (1,522 ft)

Muzga (Slovene pronunciation: [ˈmuːzɡa], in older sources Musga) is a former settlement in the Municipality of Moravče in central Slovenia. It is now part of the village of Podgorica pri Pečah. The area is part of the traditional region of Upper Carniola. The municipality is now included in the Central Slovenia Statistical Region.

== Geography ==
Muzga lies in the northern part of Podgorica pri Pečah, below the southwestern slope of Muzga Hill (Slovene: Muzgoška gorica, elevation: 556 meters or 1,824 feet).

== History ==
Muzga had a population of 32 living in five houses in 1880, and 21 living in three houses in 1900. Muzga was annexed by Podgorica pri Pečah in 1955, ending its existence as an independent settlement.
