= Podgorica pri Črnučah =

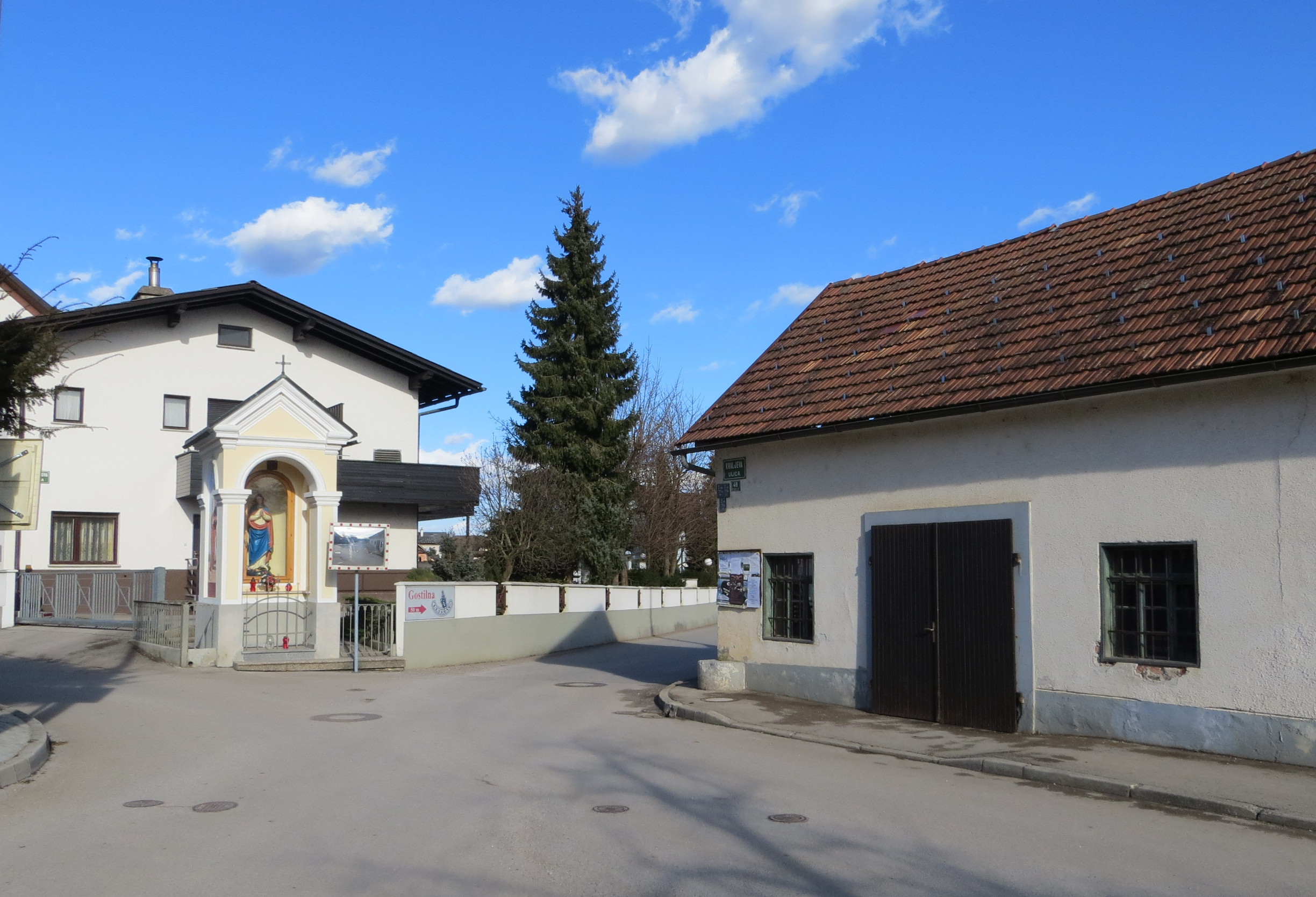

- Location in Slovenia
- Coordinates: 46°5′47.11″N 14°35′6.47″E
- Country: Slovenia
- Traditional region: Upper Carniola
- Statistical region: Central Slovenia
- Municipality: Ljubljana
- Elevation: 286 m (938 ft)

Podgorica pri Črnučah (pronounced [ˈpoːdɡɔɾitsa pɾi tʃəɾˈnuːtʃax]; German: Podgoritz) is a formerly independent settlement in the northern part of the capital Ljubljana in central Slovenia. It is part of the traditional region of Upper Carniola and is now included with the rest of the municipality in the Central Slovenia Statistical Region.

== Geography ==
Podgorica pri Črnučah is a sprawling settlement with a clustered core along the old road from Šentjakob ob Savi to Domžale nestled against the southeast slope of Podgorica Hill (Slovene: Podgoriški hrib, also Podgarški hrib, 375 m), which further transitions to Soteska Hill (Slovene: Soteški hrib, 406 m). Fields lie northeast and southeast of the village, and the soil is sandy and fertile.

== Name ==
Podgorica pri Črnučah literally means 'Podgorica near Črnuče'; the name Podgorica is a fused prepositional phrase that has lost case inflection, composed of pod 'under' + gorica 'hill'. Like similar names (e.g., Podgorje), this describes the physical location of the settlement. In the local dialect, the settlement is known as Podgarca. Podgorica was renamed Podgorica pri Črnučah in 1953 to distinguish it from other settlements with the same name. The settlement was known as Podgoritz in German in the past.

== History ==
Podgorica pri Črnučah was mentioned in written sources in 1300. During the Second World War, seven people burned to death on August 9, 1944, when German forces attacked a house containing a Partisan checkpoint. A nuclear reactor operated by the Jožef Stefan Institute was built east of the village in 1965. Podgorica pri Črnučah was annexed by the City of Ljubljana in 1984, ending its existence as an independent settlement.
