= Podboršt (Ljubljana) =

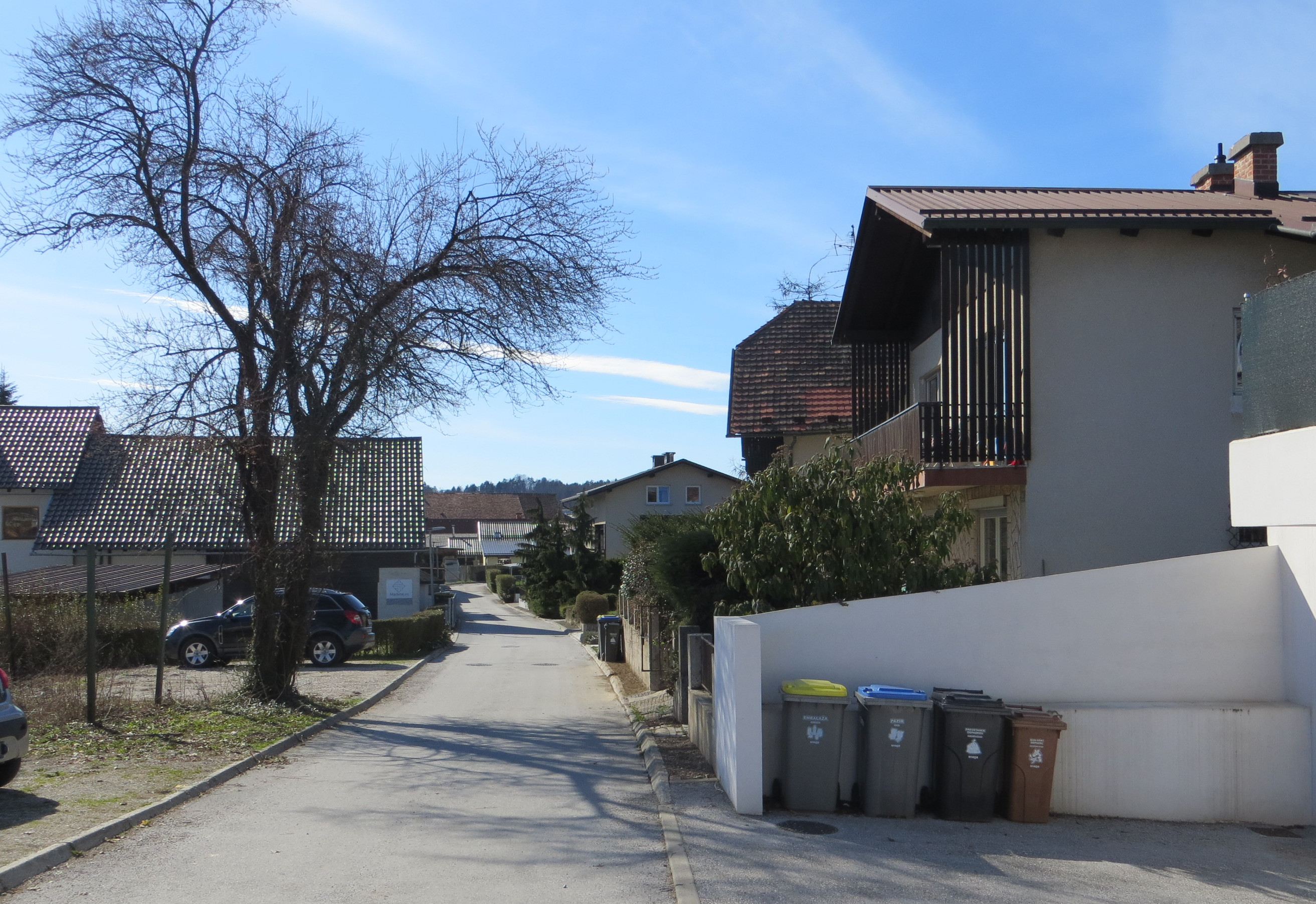

- Location in Slovenia
- Coordinates: 46°6′19.23″N 14°32′23.25″E
- Country: Slovenia
- Traditional region: Upper Carniola
- Statistical region: Central Slovenia
- Municipality: Ljubljana
- Elevation: 300 m (980 ft)

Podborst (pronounced [pɔdˈbɔɾʃt], German: Podworst) is a formerly independent settlement in the northern part of the capital Ljubljana in central Slovenia. It is part of the traditional region of Upper Carniola and is now included with the rest of the municipality in the Central Slovenia Statistical Region.

== Geography ==
Podboršt lies below the south slope of Kob Hill (391 meters or 1,283 feet) along the former main road from Ljubljana to Domžale.

== Name ==
The name Podboršt is a fused prepositional phrase that has lost case inflection, from pod 'below' + boršt 'woods', referring to the wooded slope of Kob Hill, which rises above the former village. The common noun boršt is a borrowing from Middle High German for(e)st 'woods, forest', and is found in other Slovene toponyms such as Boršt.

== History ==
After the Second World War, extensive new housing was built in Podboršt. The village was annexed by Črnuče in 1953, ending its existence as an independent settlement. Črnuče itself was annexed by Ljubljana in 1980.
