= Ježa =

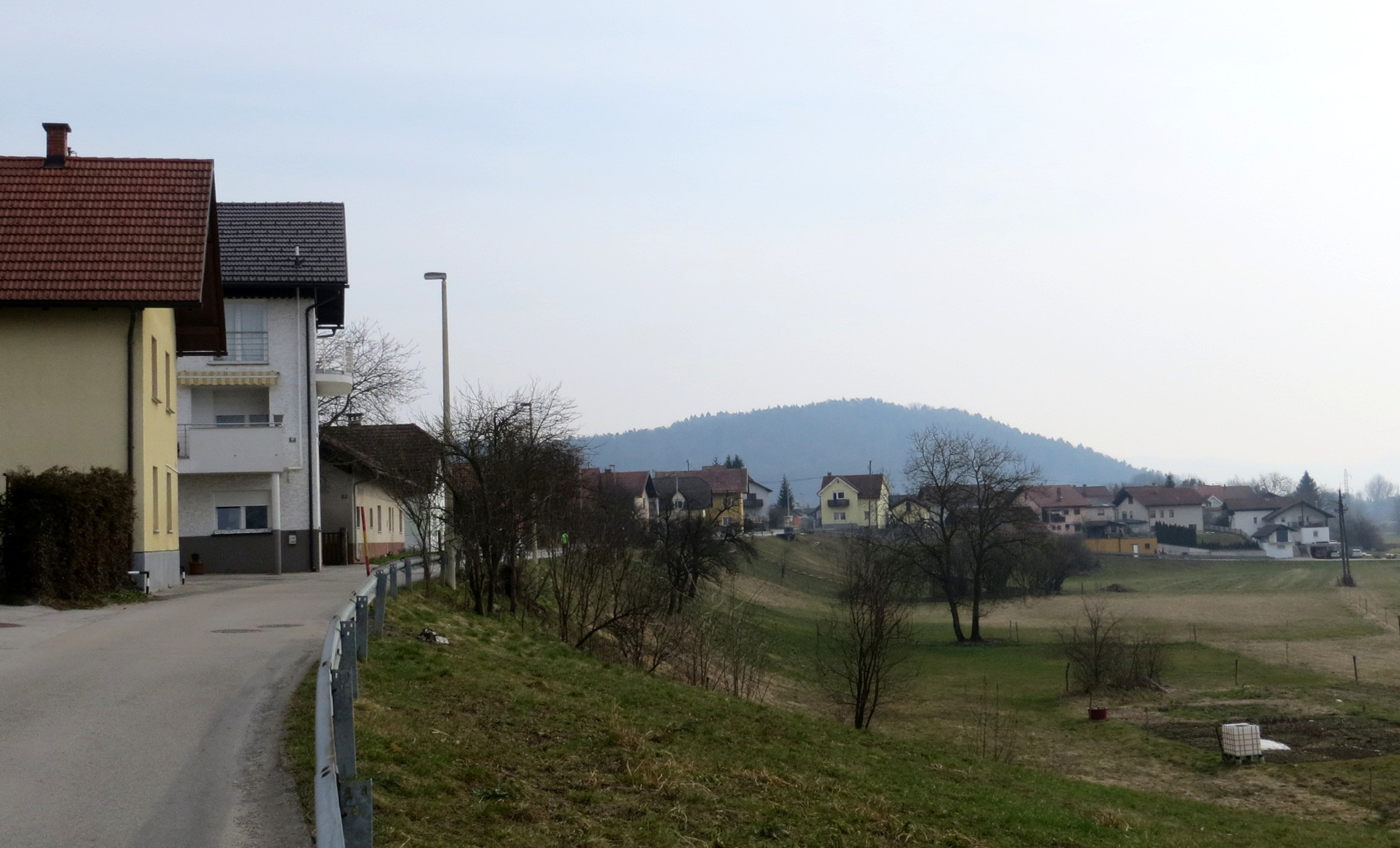

- Location in Slovenia
- Coordinates: 46°6′3.2″N 14°32′46.52″E
- Country: Slovenia
- Traditional region: Upper Carniola
- Statistical region: Central Slovenia
- Municipality: Ljubljana
- Elevation: 290 m (950 ft)

Ježa (pronounced [ˈjeːʒa]) is a formerly independent settlement in the northern part of the capital Ljubljana in central Slovenia. It is part of the traditional region of Upper Carniola and is now included with the rest of the municipality in the Central Slovenia Statistical Region.

== Geography ==
Ježa is a linear settlement on a terrace above the Sava River east of Črnuče and southeast of the railroad to Kamnik. Most of the houses are along the road to Nadgorica, and a few extend onto the bank towards the plain along the Sava. The soil is sandy, and there are fields to the north and south of the settlement.

== Name ==
Ježa was attested in written sources in 1364 as Jes (and as Yecz in 1436 and Yess in 1478). The name is derived from the Slovene common noun ježa 'small grassy slope between two flat areas in a valley'. The name therefore refers to the local geography (cf. Ježica).

== History ==
After the Second World War, an asphalt plant was established in Ježa. A factory producing dissolved acetylene was established in 1967. Ježa annexed the village of Brod in 1952; Ježa itself was annexed by the City of Ljubljana in 1979, ending its existence as an independent settlement.
