= Nadgorica =

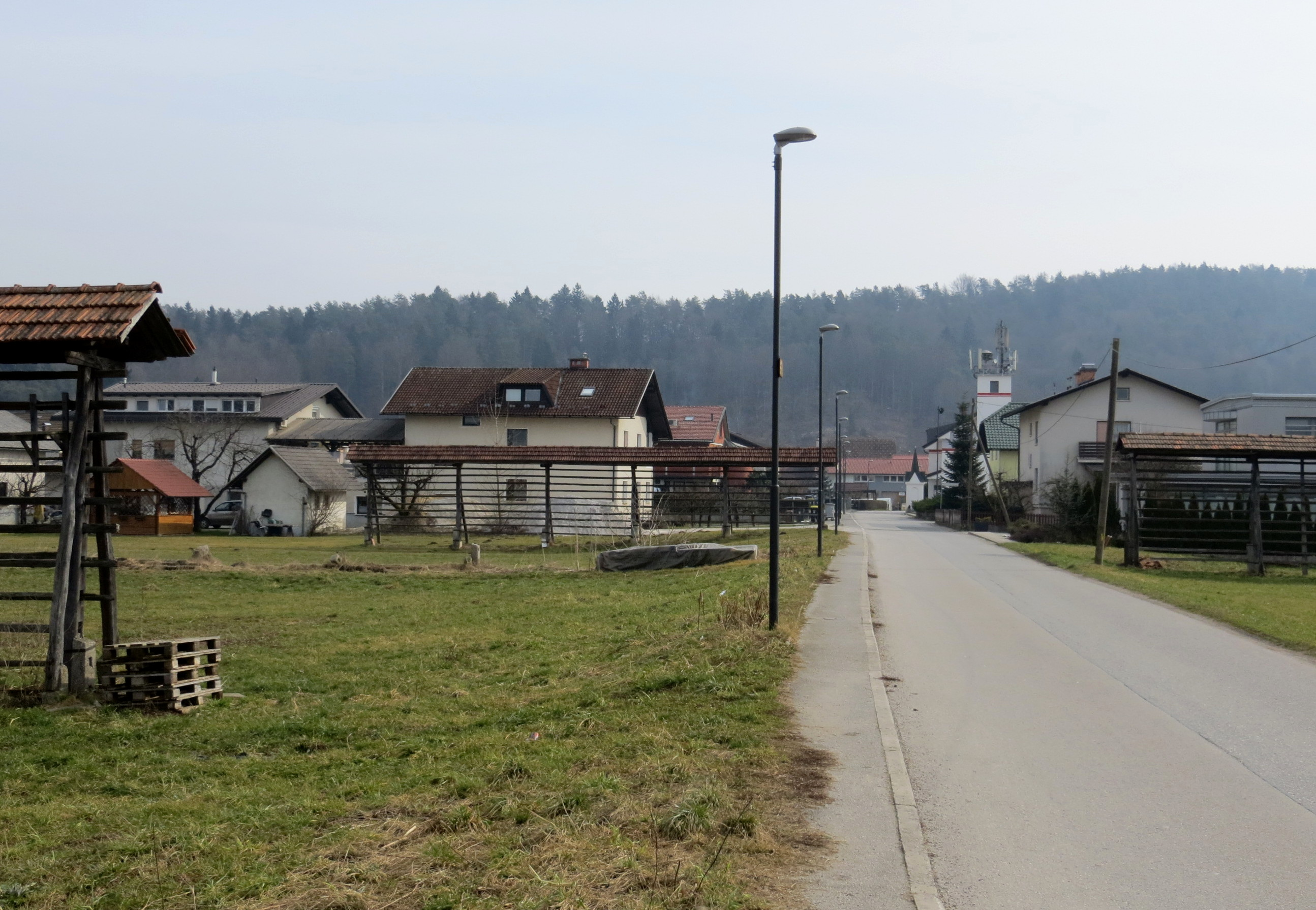

- Location in Slovenia
- Coordinates: 46°5′53.49″N 14°33′38.78″E
- Country: Slovenia
- Traditional region: Upper Carniola
- Statistical region: Central Slovenia
- Municipality: Ljubljana
- Elevation: 295 m (968 ft)

Nadgorica (pronounced [ˈnaːdɡɔɾitsa]; German: Nadgoritz) is a formerly independent settlement in the northern part of the capital Ljubljana in central Slovenia. It is part of the traditional region of Upper Carniola and is now included with the rest of the municipality in the Central Slovenia Statistical Region.

== Geography ==
Nadgorica is a clustered settlement at the foot of Soteska Hill (405 m). It consists of two groups of houses; the older part lies north of the road from Črnuče to Litija at the foot of the hill. The other, newer part lies south of the main road and extends to Ježa. The soil in the area is sandy, and there are fields north, west, and south of the settlement.

== Name ==
In the local dialect, Nadgorica is known as Nadgarca. In the past the German name was Nadgoritz.

== History ==
Nadgorica was first mentioned in written sources in 1300. A prehistoric fortification is believed to have stood on Soteska Hill, testifying to early settlement of the area. Nadgorica was annexed by the City of Ljubljana in 1979, ending its existence as an independent settlement.

== Church ==
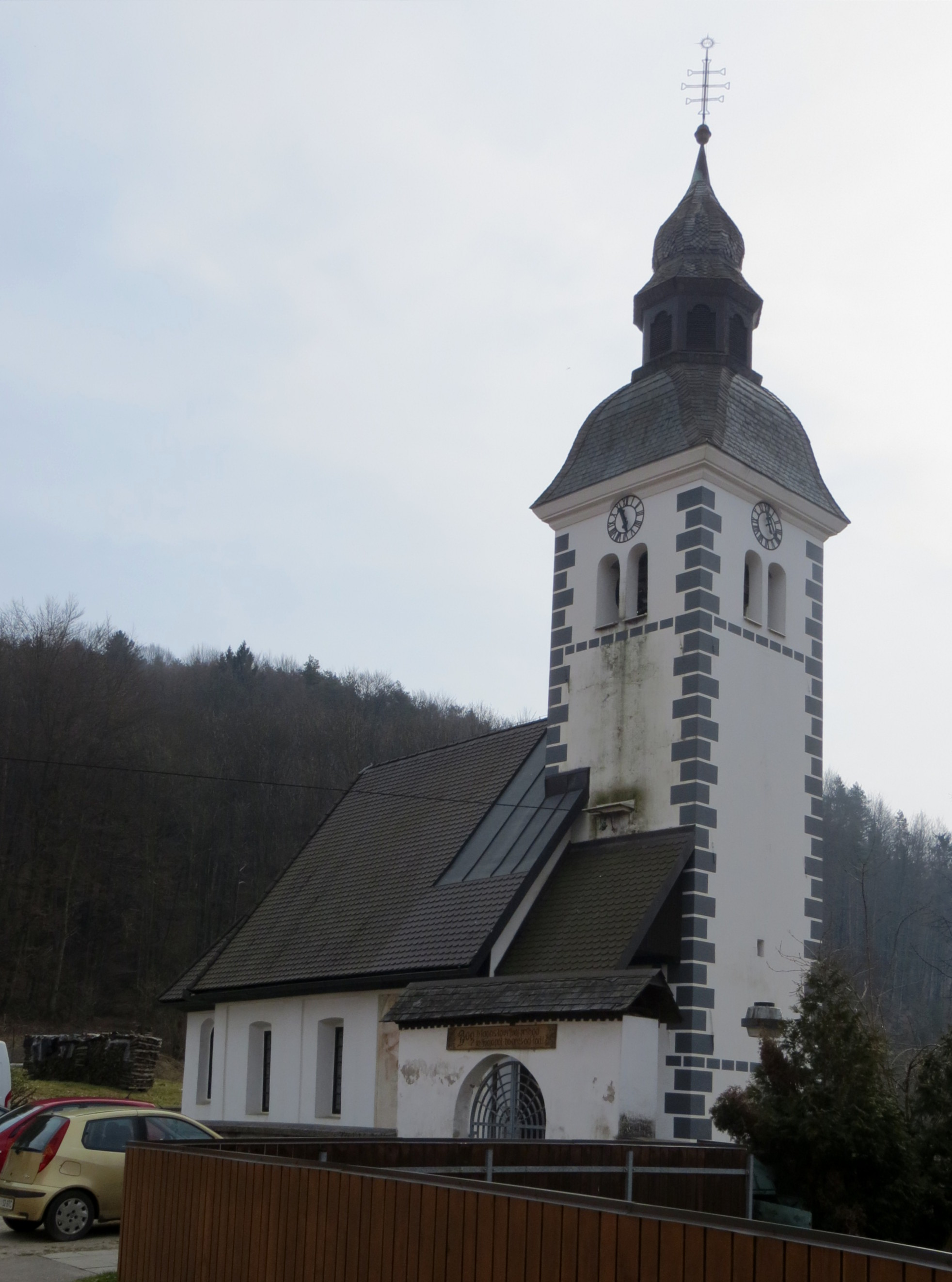
View from northwest

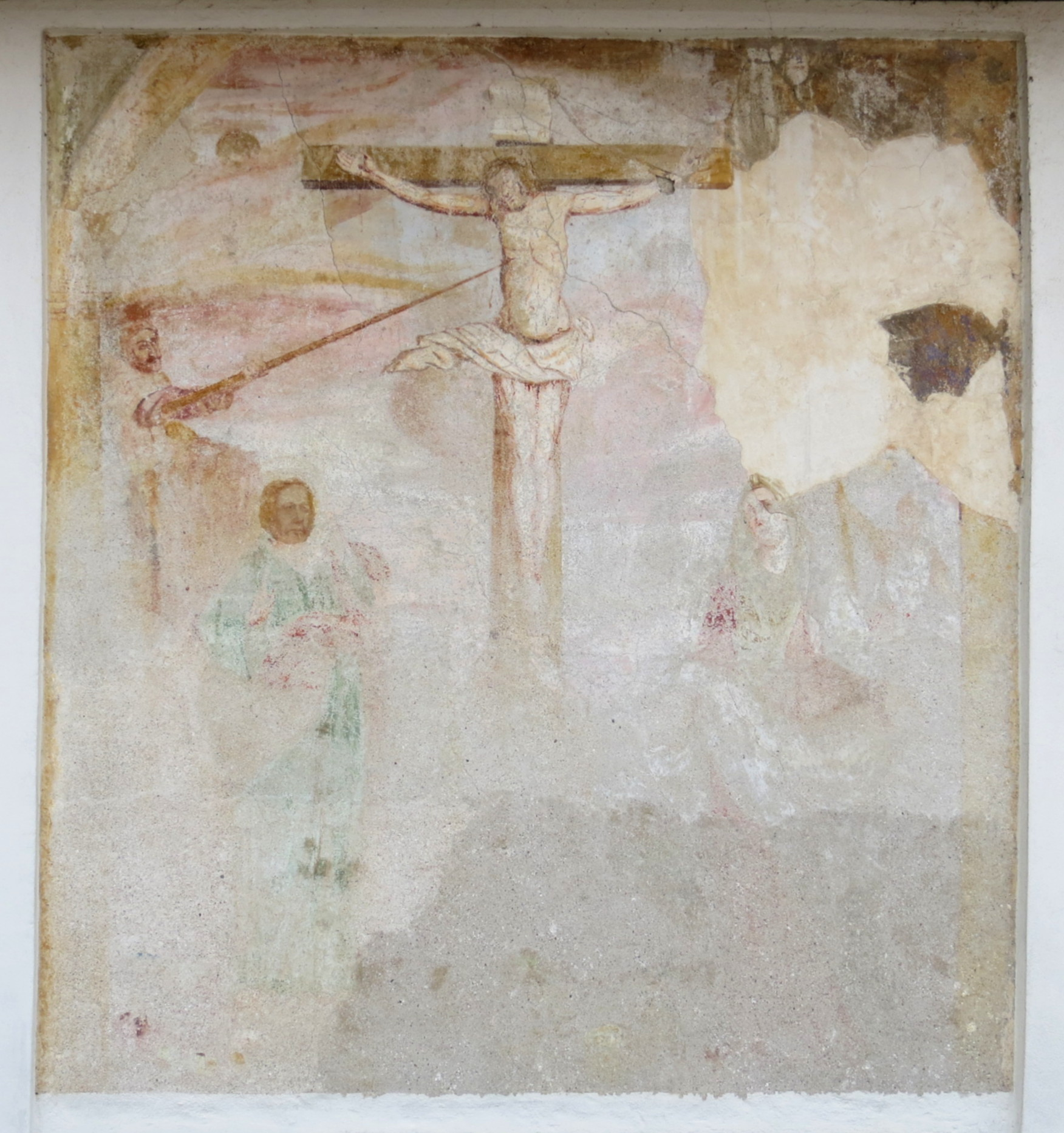
Exterior fresco

Saint John the Baptist Church

The church in the settlement is dedicated to John the Baptist. It was probably reworked in the Baroque style in 1710, as indicated by the year carved on the chancel. The sacristy contains a wooden cabinet dating to 1788. The church altar is late Baroque, and the paintings of Saint Lucy and Saint Martin are 1831 works by Janez Potočnik (1749–1834). The exterior of the church has a Baroque fresco depicting the crucifixion.
