= Gmajna (Ljubljana) =

- Location in Slovenia
- Coordinates: 46°6′30″N 14°31′40″E
- Country: Slovenia
- Traditional region: Upper Carniola
- Statistical region: Central Slovenia
- Municipality: Ljubljana
- Elevation: 300 m (980 ft)

Gmajna (pronounced [ˈɡmaːi̯na], German: Gmaina) is a formerly independent settlement in the northern part of the capital Ljubljana in central Slovenia. It is part of the traditional region of Upper Carniola and is now included with the rest of the municipality in the Central Slovenia Statistical Region.

== Geography ==
Gmajna lies below the southwest slope of Hrastovec Hill (394 meters or 1,293 feet), north of the center of Črnuče.

== Name ==
The name Gmajna means 'commons', referring to land jointly owned and used by the village community. The Slovenian common noun gmajna is a borrowing from Middle High German gemeine, with the same meaning, and is found in other Slovene toponyms such as Gmajna near Slovenj Gradec as well as in the diminutive form Gmajnica.

== History ==
Gmajna had a population of 108 in 1900, and 135 in 1931. Gmajna was annexed by Črnuče in 1953, ending its existence as an independent settlement. Črnuče itself was annexed by Ljubljana in 1980.
