= Brod (Črnuče District) =

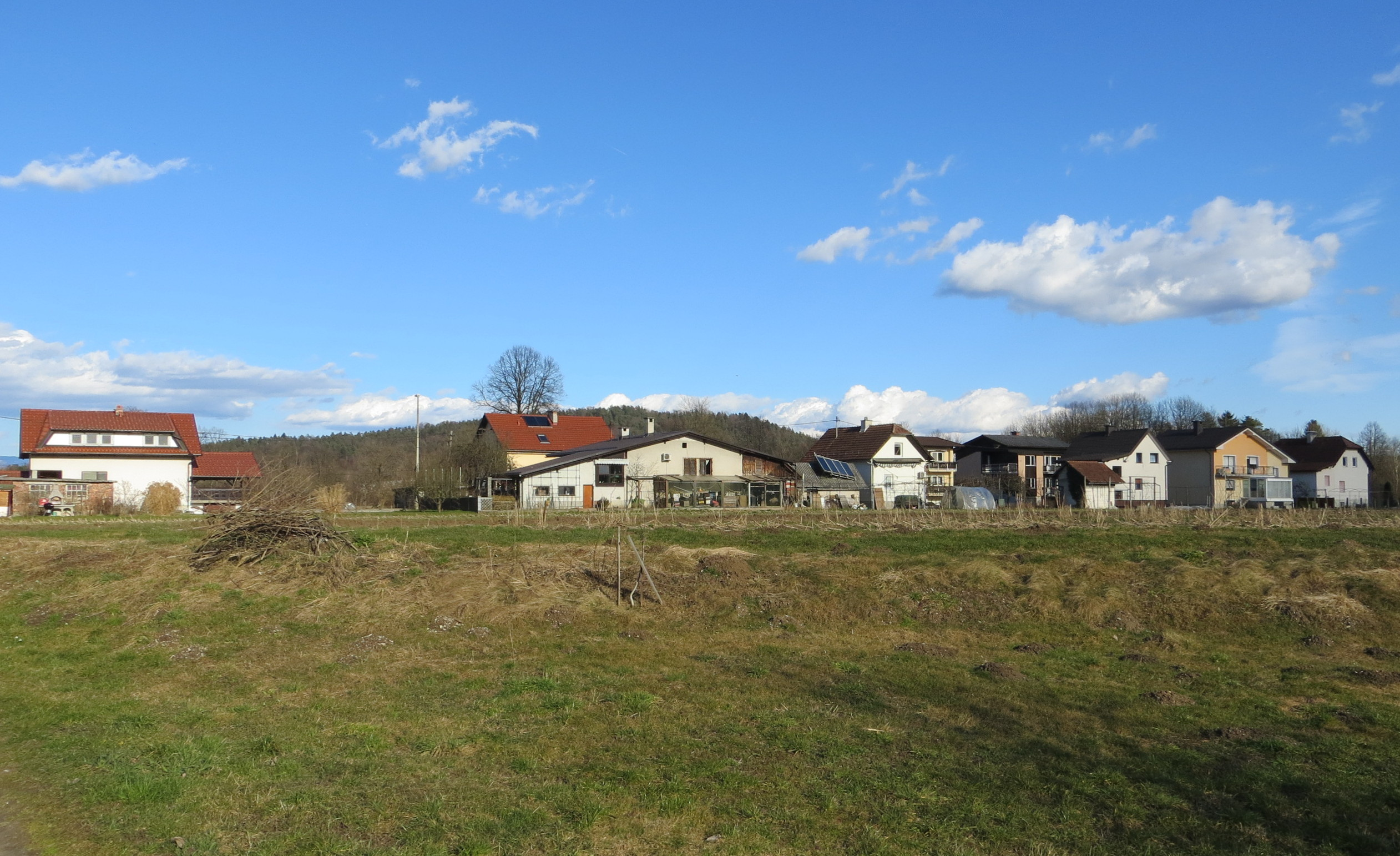

- Location in Slovenia
- Coordinates: 46°5′40.77″N 14°32′45.91″E
- Country: Slovenia
- Traditional region: Upper Carniola
- Statistical region: Central Slovenia
- Municipality: Ljubljana
- Elevation: 285 m (935 ft)

Brod (pronounced [ˈbɾoːt]; sometimes also Prod) is a formerly independent settlement in the northern part of the capital Ljubljana in central Slovenia. It is part of the traditional region of Upper Carniola and is now included with the rest of the municipality in the Central Slovenia Statistical Region.

== Geography ==
Brod lies on a side road in the middle of meadows southeast of Črnuče and north of the Sava River.

== Name ==
Places named Brod are generally derived from the Slovene common noun brod 'ford' or 'ferry', referring to a place where a river was crossed. However, in this case the name is derived from the common noun prod 'gravel, stones carried and deposited by water', referring to the terrain. Old maps show that the Sava River formerly flowed closer to the village (but lacked a ferry), and the Jarše Gravel Bank (Slovene: Jarški prod) south of the village is labeled Jarski brod on a 1900 map.

== History ==
In 1900, Brod had a population of only 17 people living in four houses. Brod was annexed by the village of Ježa in 1952, ending its existence as an independent settlement. Ježa itself was annexed by the city of Ljubljana in 1979.
