= Gmajna, Krško =

Gmajna
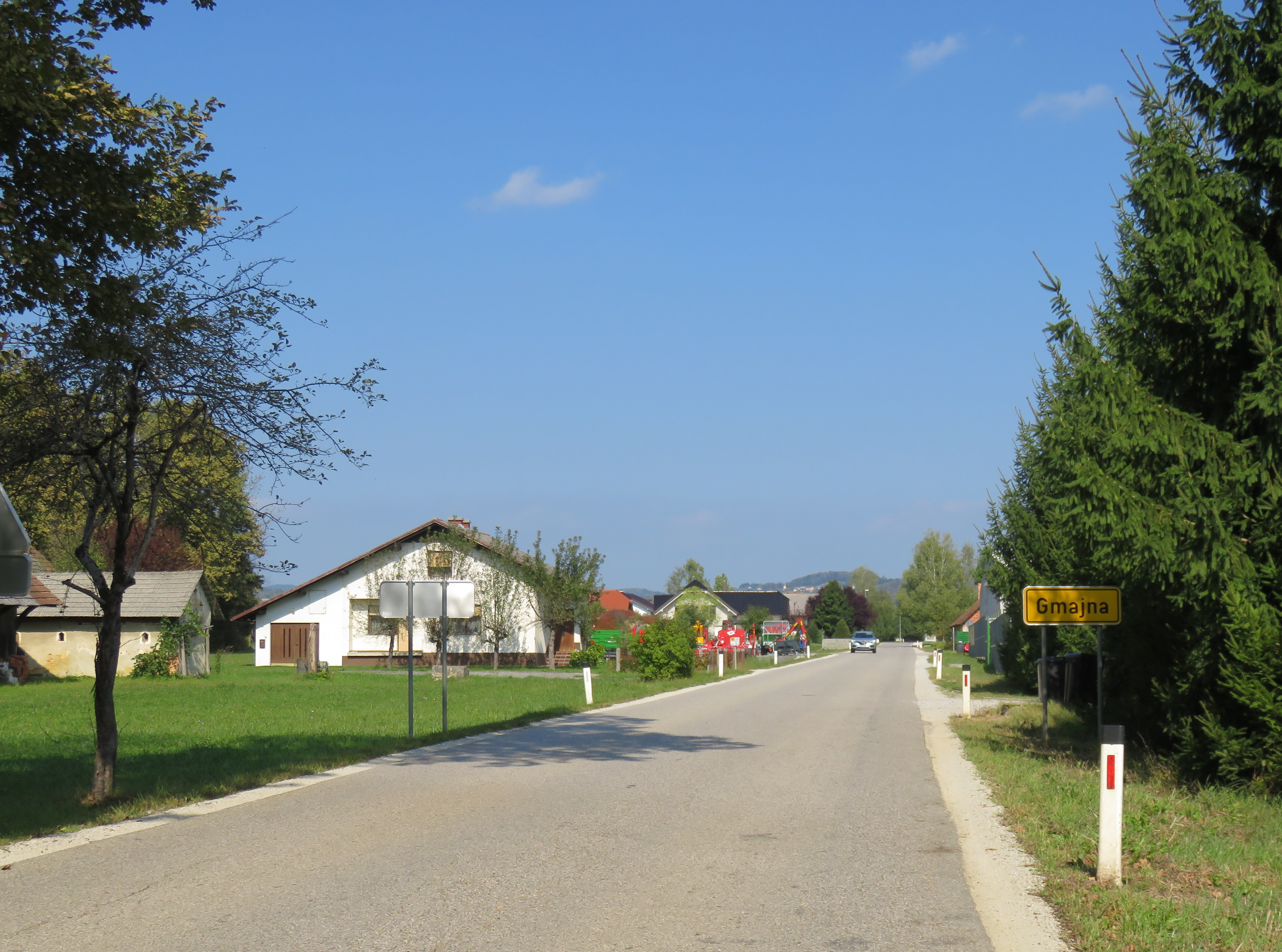

- Location in Slovenia
- Coordinates: 45°54′15.43″N 15°22′10.22″E
- Country: Slovenia
- Traditional region: Lower Carniola
- Statistical region: Lower Sava
- Municipality: Krško

Area
  - Total: 5.36 km^{2} (2.07 sq mi)
- Elevation: 165.8 m (544 ft)

Population (2002)
  - Total: 153
- Postal code: 8274

Gmajna (pronounced [ˈɡmaːi̯na]) is a settlement in the Municipality of Krško in eastern Slovenia. The A2 motorway from Ljubljana to Zagreb runs through the territory of Gmajna. The area is part of the traditional region of Lower Carniola. It is now included in the Lower Sava Statistical Region.

== Name ==
The name Gmajna means 'commons', referring to land that was jointly owned and used by the village community. The Slovenian common noun gmajna is a borrowing from Middle High German gemeine, with the same meaning, and is found in other Slovene toponyms such as Gmajna near Slovenj Gradec as well as in the diminutive form Gmajnica.

== Cultural heritage ==
There is a small chapel-shrine in the settlement dedicated to the Virgin Mary. It was built in the early 20th century.
