= Gmajna, Slovenj Gradec =

Gmajna
- Location in Slovenia
- Coordinates: 46°31′20.18″N 15°3′41.99″E
- Country: Slovenia
- Traditional region: Styria
- Statistical region: Carinthia
- Municipality: Slovenj Gradec

Area
  - Total: 6.119 km^{2} (2.363 sq mi)
- Elevation: 521.9 m (1,712 ft)

Population (2026)
  - Total: 455
  - Density: 74/km^{2} (190/sq mi)

Gmajna (pronounced [ˈɡmaːi̯na]) is a dispersed settlement in the City Municipality of Slovenj Gradec in northern Slovenia. It lies in the hills northwest of the town of Slovenj Gradec. The area is part of the traditional region of Styria. The entire municipality is now included in the Carinthia Statistical Region. In January 2026, the population was 455.

== Name ==
The name Gmajna means 'commons', referring to land that was jointly owned and used by the village community. The Slovenian common noun gmajna is a borrowing from Middle High German gemeine, with the same meaning, and is found in other Slovene toponyms such as Gmajna near Krško as well as in the diminutive form Gmajnica.

== Clandestine grave ==
Gmajna is the site of a clandestine grave associated with the Second World War. The Sveteč Woods Grave (Slovene: Grobišče Svetečev gozd) is located next to an elder tree in the woods 250 meters (820 ft) south of the house at Bukovska Vas no. 18. It contains the remains of a Croatian soldier.
