= Podgorac (Ražanj) =

Podgorac Подгорац
- Village
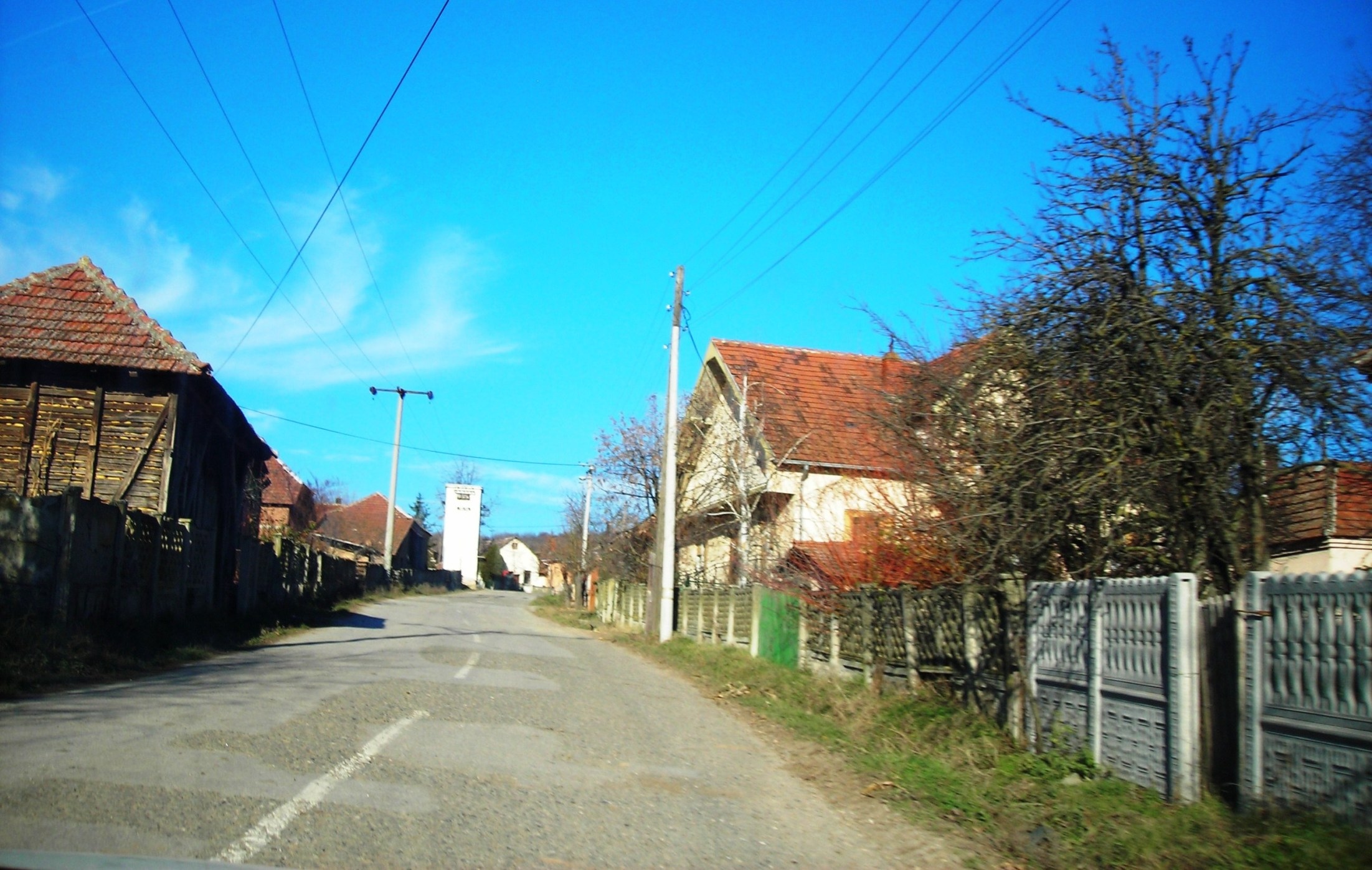

- Location within Serbia
- Coordinates: 43°44′08″N 21°35′56″E
- Country: Serbia
- District: Nišava District
- Municipality: Ražanj

Population (2002)
  - Total: 516
- Time zone: UTC+1 (CET)
  - Summer (DST): UTC+2 (CEST)

Podgorac is a village in the municipality of Ražanj, Serbia. According to the 2002 census, the village has a population of 516 people.
