= Podgorica pri Šmarju =

Podgorica pri Šmarju Podgorica (until 1955)
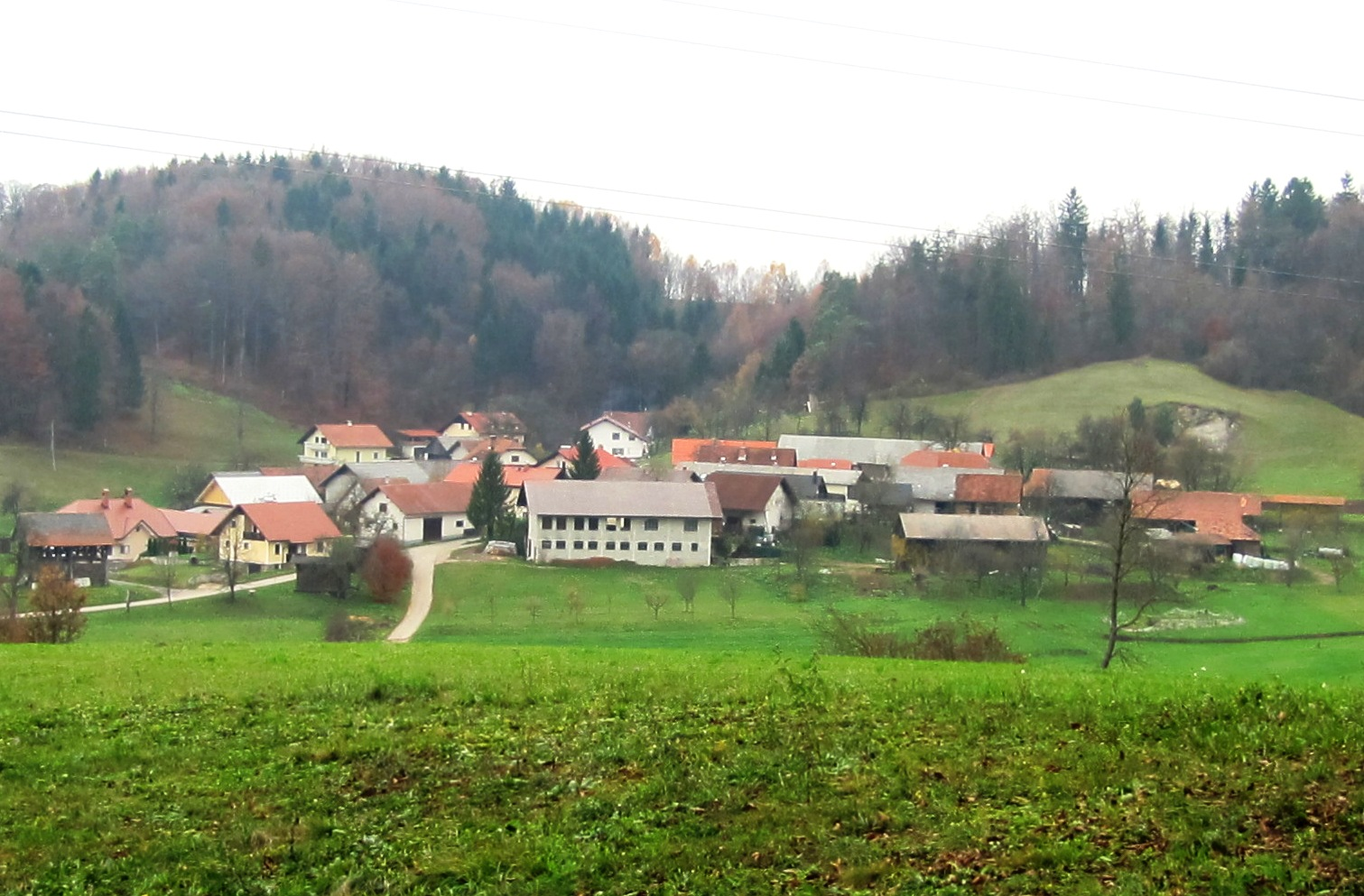
- Podgorica pri Šmarju

- Location in Slovenia
- Coordinates: 45°58′53.28″N 14°37′12.56″E
- Country: Slovenia
- Traditional region: Lower Carniola
- Statistical region: Central Slovenia
- Municipality: Grosuplje

Area
  - Total: 1.18 km^{2} (0.46 sq mi)
- Elevation: 376.9 m (1,237 ft)

Population (2002)
  - Total: 86

Podgorica pri Šmarju (pronounced [pɔdɡɔˈɾiːtsa pɾi ˈʃmaːɾju]) is a small settlement just north of Šmarje–Sap in the Municipality of Grosuplje in central Slovenia. The area is part of the historical region of Lower Carniola and is now included in the Central Slovenia Statistical Region.

== Name ==
The name Podgorica is a fused prepositional phrase that has lost its case inflection (from pod 'below' + gorica 'small mountain'), literally meaning 'below the small mountain'. Place names like Podgorica (e.g., Podgorje, Podgora) are relatively common in Slovenia. The name of the settlement was changed from Podgorica to Podgorica pri Šmarju in 1955.
