= Soteska (Ljubljana) =

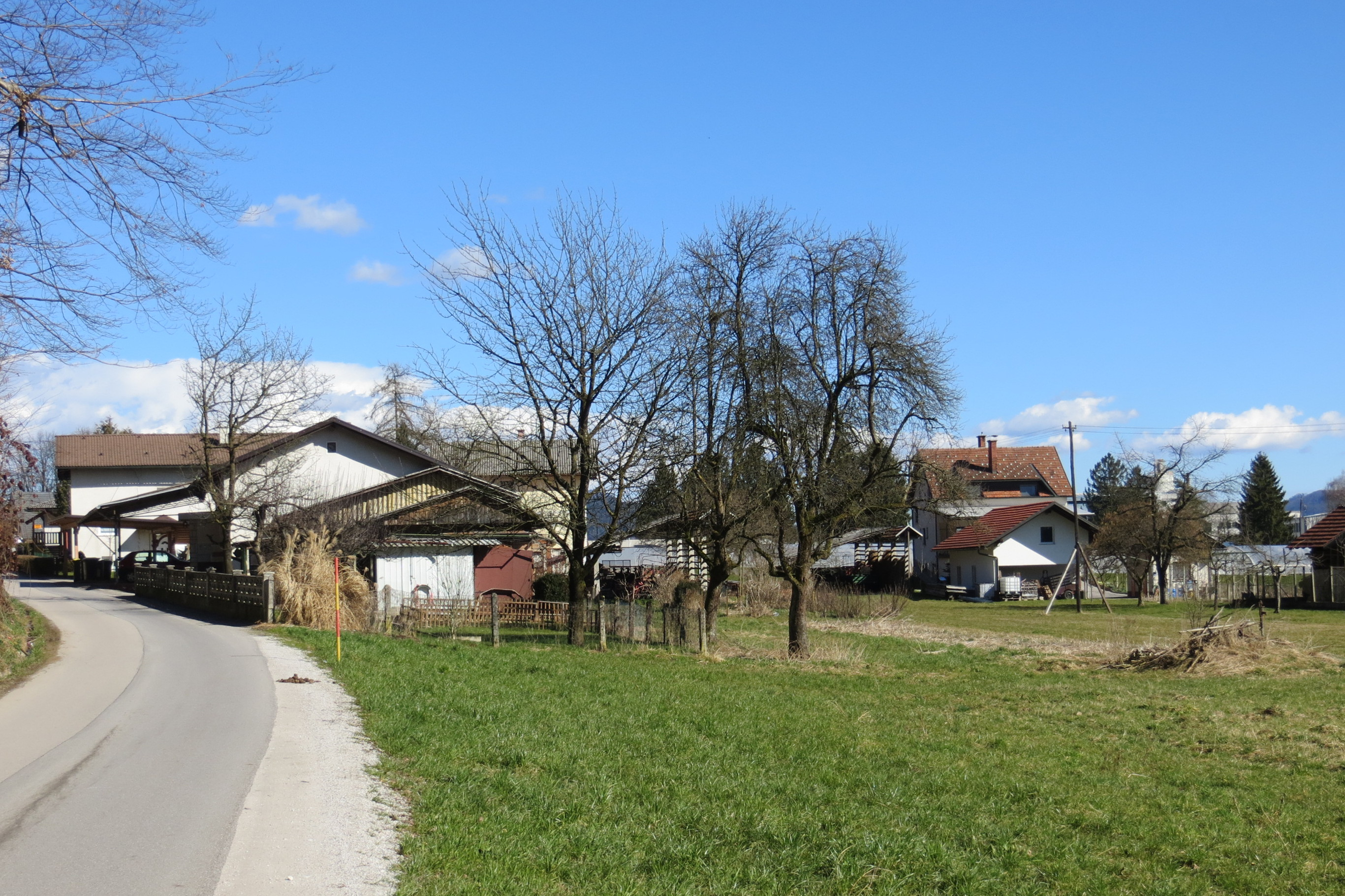

- Location in Slovenia
- Coordinates: 46°5′36.64″N 14°34′19.12″E
- Country: Slovenia
- Traditional region: Upper Carniola
- Statistical region: Central Slovenia
- Municipality: Ljubljana
- Elevation: 286 m (938 ft)

Soteska (pronounced [sɔˈteːska]) is a formerly independent settlement in the northern part of the capital Ljubljana in central Slovenia. It is part of the traditional region of Upper Carniola and is now included with the rest of the municipality in the Central Slovenia Statistical Region.

== Geography ==
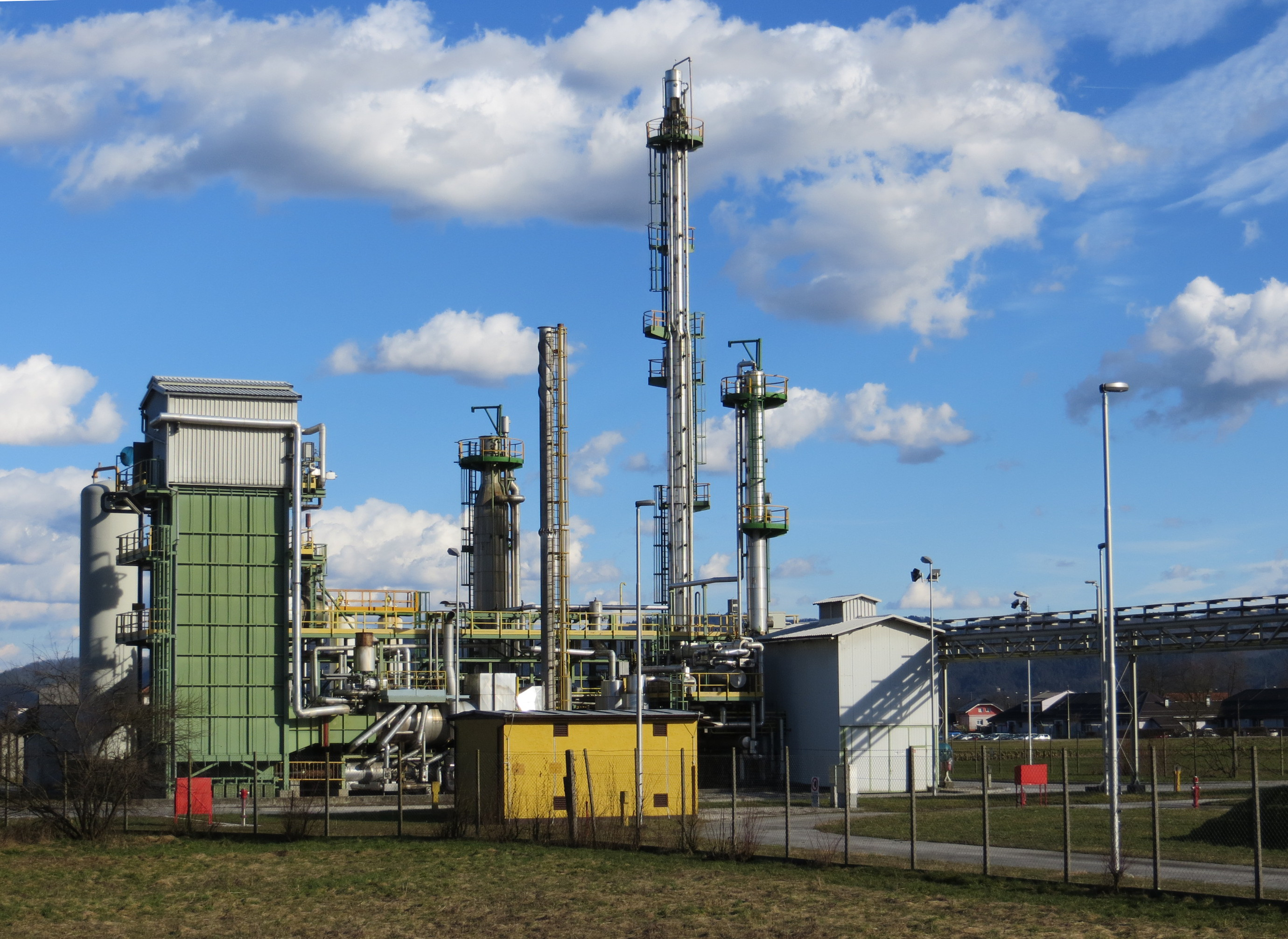
Belinka Perkemija plant

Soteska lies north of the Sava River and is nestled against the southeast slope of Soteska Hill (Slovene: Soteški hrib, 406 m). The Belinka Perkemija chemical company stands immediately east of the village.

== Name ==
The name Soteska is derived from the Slovene common noun soteska 'gorge', 'ravine', or referring to a place where a valley meets the side of a hill or mountain, thus referring to the physical location of the settlement.

== History ==
Folk tradition says that a castle stood on the hill above the hamlet of Soteska and was destroyed by the Ottomans, but no trace of the structure remains today. There is an old shrine in the village that is believed to be associated with the Ottomans. Soteska was a popular excursion destination for Ljubljana residents before the Second World War. Soteska was annexed by Šentjakob ob Savi in 1953, ending its existence as an independent settlement. Šentjakob ob Savi itself was annexed by the City of Ljubljana in 1984.
