= Šentjakob ob Savi =

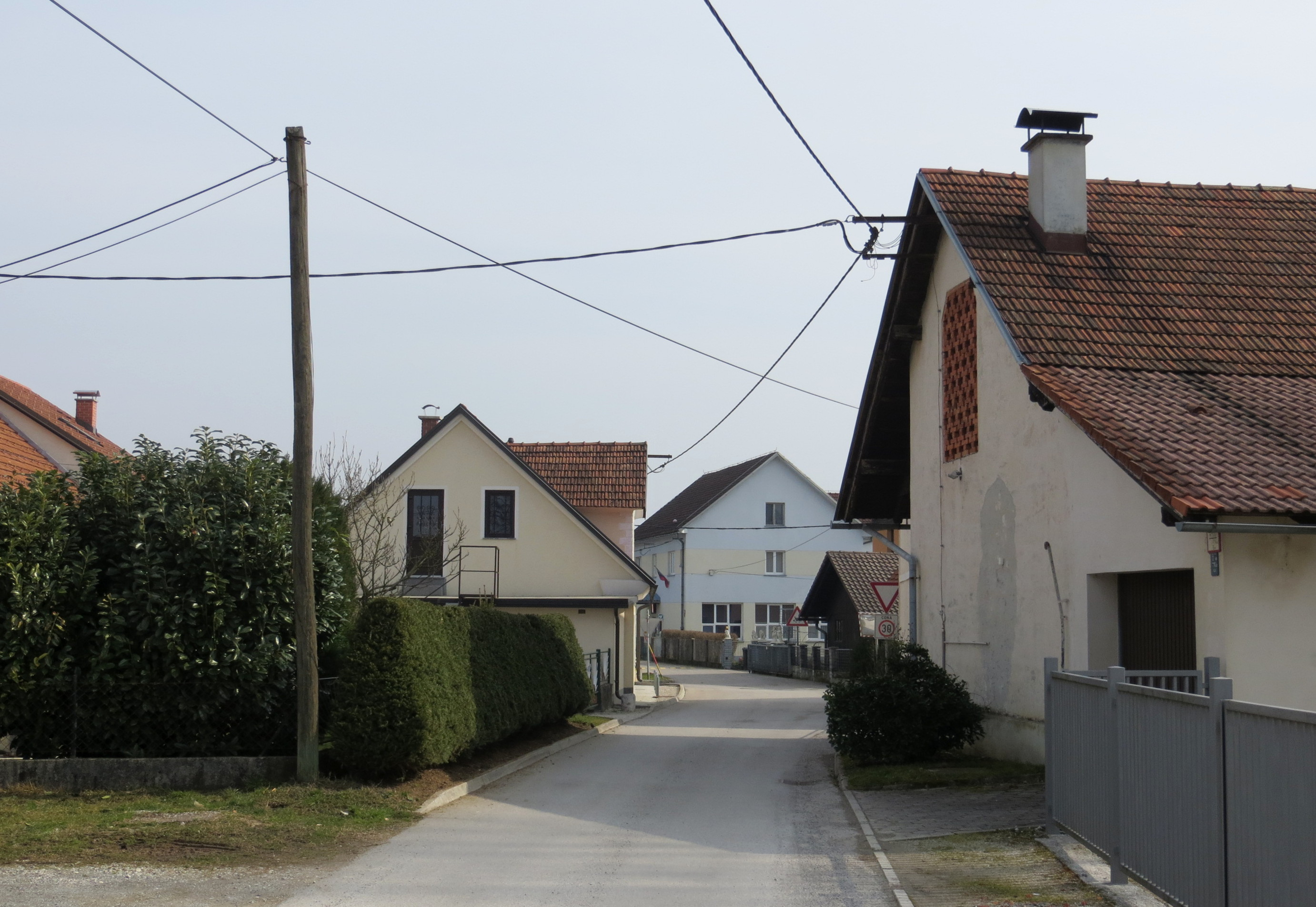

- Location in Slovenia
- Coordinates: 46°5′25.71″N 14°35′1.40″E
- Country: Slovenia
- Traditional region: Upper Carniola
- Statistical region: Central Slovenia
- Municipality: Ljubljana
- Elevation: 285 m (935 ft)

Šentjakob ob Savi (pronounced [ʃɛnˈtjaːkɔp ɔp ˈsaːʋi] or [ʃənˈtjaːkɔp ɔp ˈsaːʋi]; in older sources also Sveti Jakob ob Savi, German: Sankt Jakob) is a formerly independent settlement in the northeastern part of the capital Ljubljana in central Slovenia. It is part of the traditional region of Upper Carniola and is now included with the rest of the municipality in the Central Slovenia Statistical Region. It includes the hamlets of Pečnik and Soteska.

== Geography ==
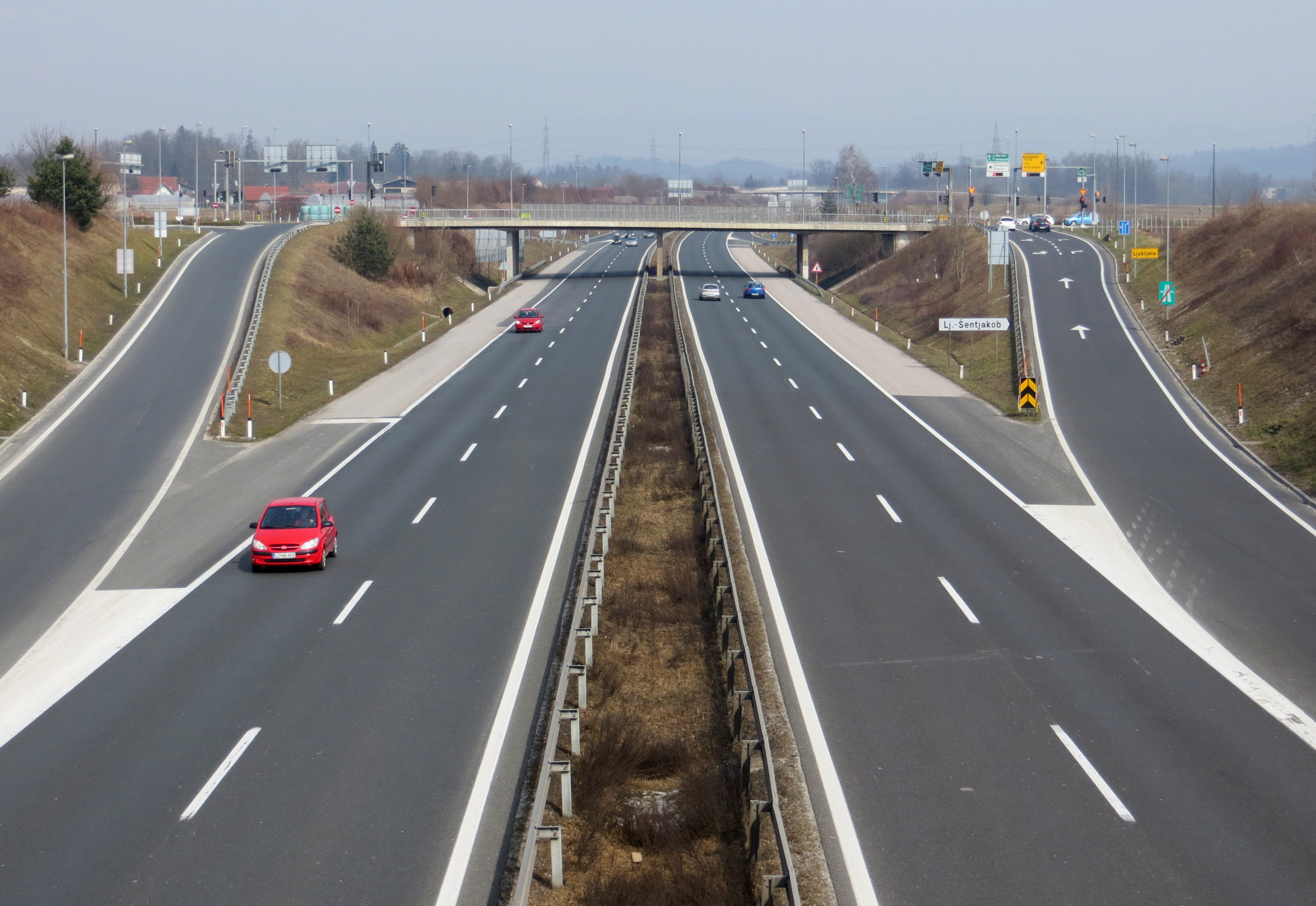
A1 Freeway east of Šentjakob ob Savi

Šentjakob ob Savi is a clustered settlement on a terrace above the Sava River east of Črnuče. The old channel of the Sava can be seen in the southern part of the village, where the river flowed before it was regulated during construction of the Austrian Southern Railway. The soil is sandy and fertile. The A1 Freeway runs directly east of the old village center.

== Name ==
The name Šentjakob ob Savi literally means 'Saint James on the Sava River'. The name Šentjakob is a compound of Slovene šent 'saint' and Jakob 'James', after whom the church in the village is named.

== History ==
Folk tradition says that a castle stood on the hill above the hamlet of Soteska and was destroyed by the Ottomans, but no trace of the structure remains today. Šentjakob ob Savi was a ferry point across the Sava River until 1584, when a bridge was built to serve the postal connection between Graz and Venice. The postal route was relocated via Kamnik in 1717 because of frequent flooding of the Sava. A part-time school was established in Šentjakob ob Savi in 1788, and regular schooling started in 1869. School was held in the sexton's house until 1903, when a schoolhouse was built. Before the Second World War, weaving straw was a traditional economic activity in the village, where they also produced tote bags made of straw. This activity was given up due to competition from Tyrol. The hamlet of Soteska was formerly an independent settlement, but was annexed to Šentjakob ob Savi in 1953, before Šentjakob ob Savi itself was annexed by the City of Ljubljana in 1984.

== Church ==
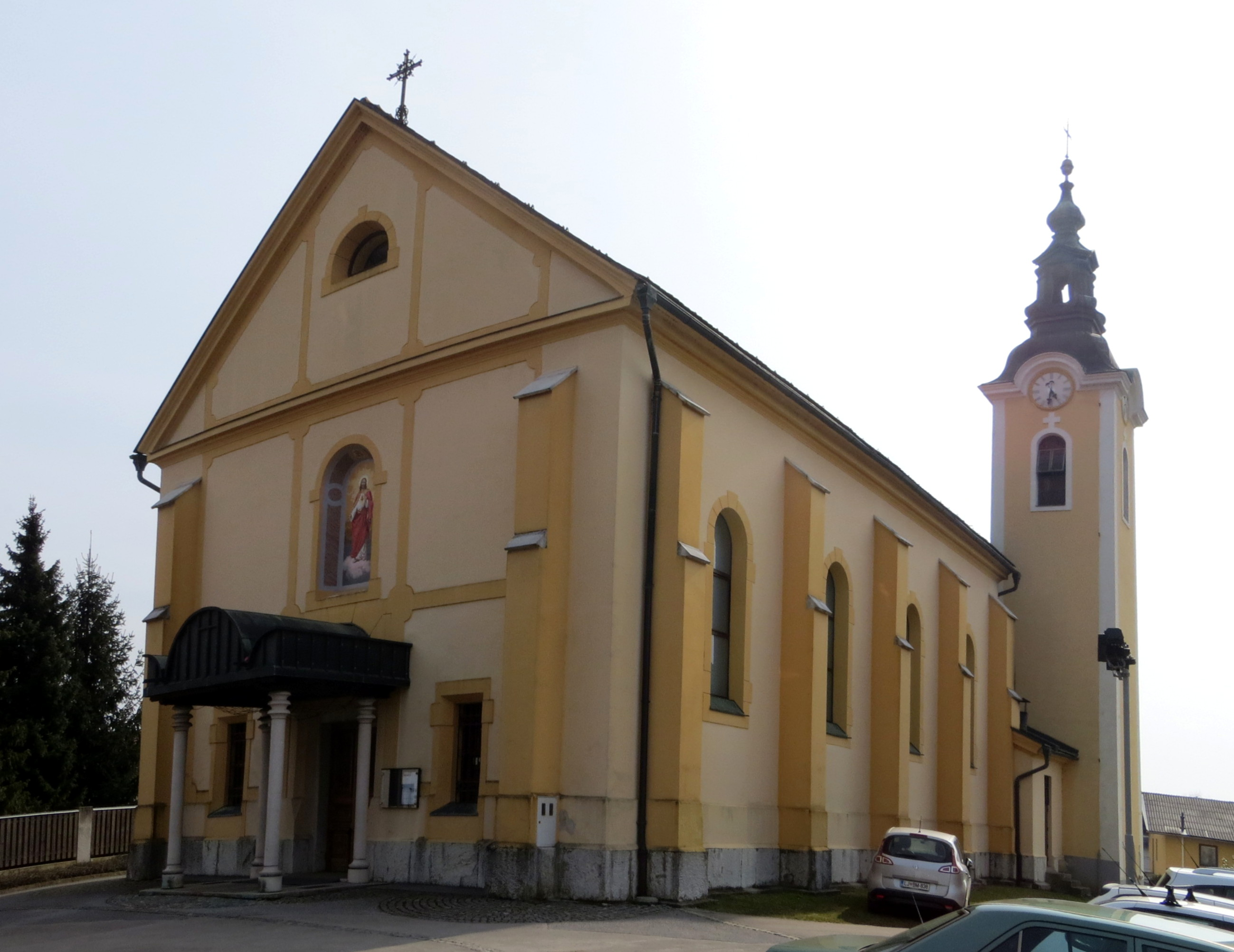
Saint James's Church

Saint James' Church was built in 1899 at the site of a former church that was destroyed in the 1895 Ljubljana earthquake. The Baroque bell tower of the old church was incorporated into the new structure. The church is decorated with a 1913 fresco by Simon Ogrin (1851–1930). The church initially belonged to the proto-parish of Mengeš, but was made the seat of a parish in 1787.

== Notable people ==
Notable people that were born or lived in Šentjakob ob Savi include the following.

- Anton Vilar (1884–1953), composer, organist, and photographer
- Valentin Vodnik's grandfather was born in Šentjakob ob Savi and moved to Trata when he married into the Žibert family
