= Gmajnica =

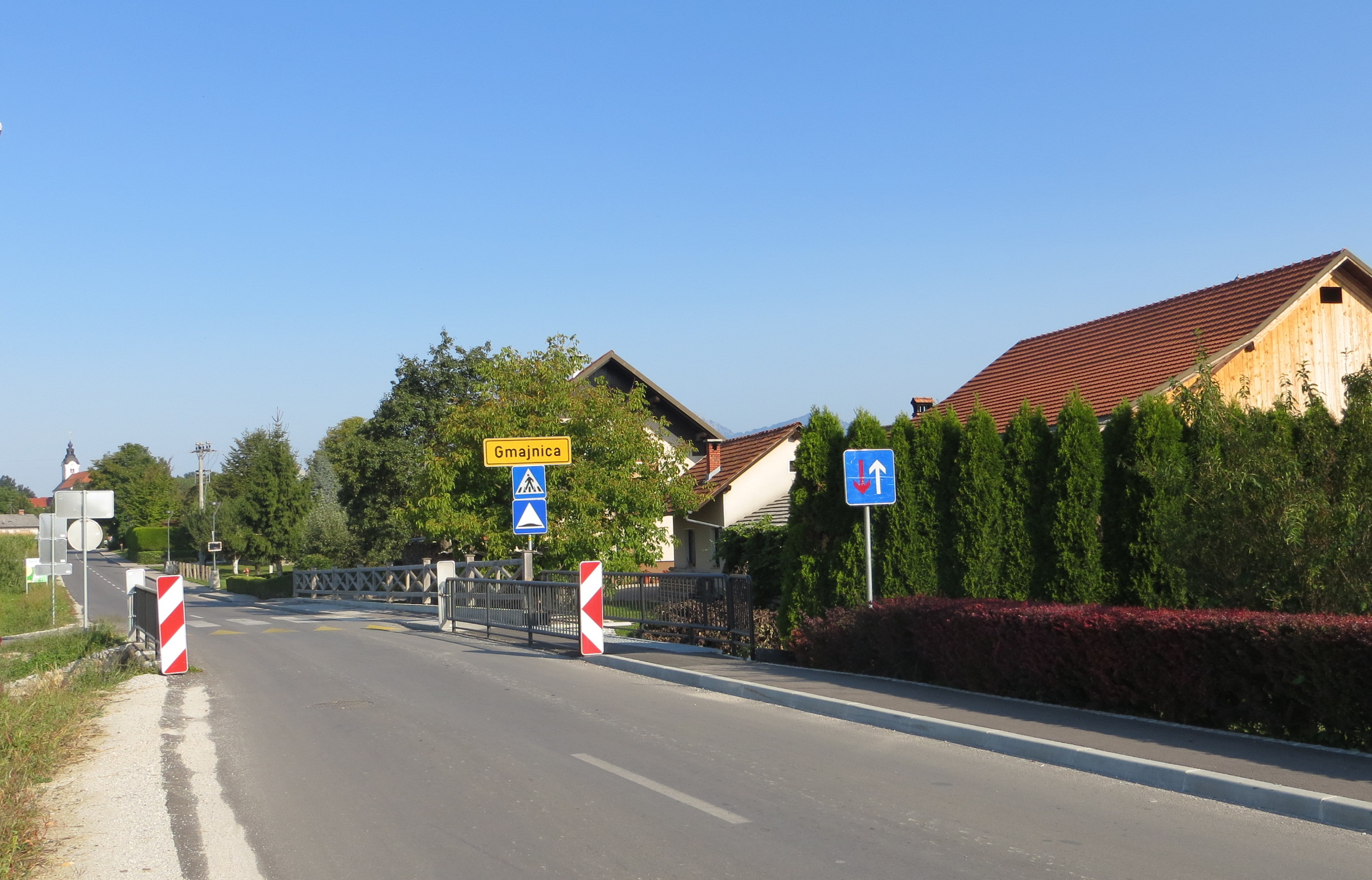

- Location in Slovenia
- Coordinates: 46°12′29.53″N 14°32′41.52″E
- Country: Slovenia
- Traditional region: Upper Carniola
- Statistical region: Central Slovenia
- Municipality: Komenda

Area
  - Total: 0.27 km^{2} (0.10 sq mi)
- Elevation: 343 m (1,125 ft)

Population (2002)
  - Total: 297

Gmajnica (pronounced [ˈɡmaːi̯nitsa]) is a settlement in the Municipality of Komenda in the Upper Carniola region of Slovenia.

== Name ==
The name Gmajnica is a diminutive of the common noun gmajna 'commons', referring to land that was jointly owned and used by the village community. The noun gmajna is a borrowing from Middle High German gemeine, with the same meaning, and it is found in other Slovene toponyms such as Gmajna near Krško.
