= Soteska, Kamnik =

Soteska
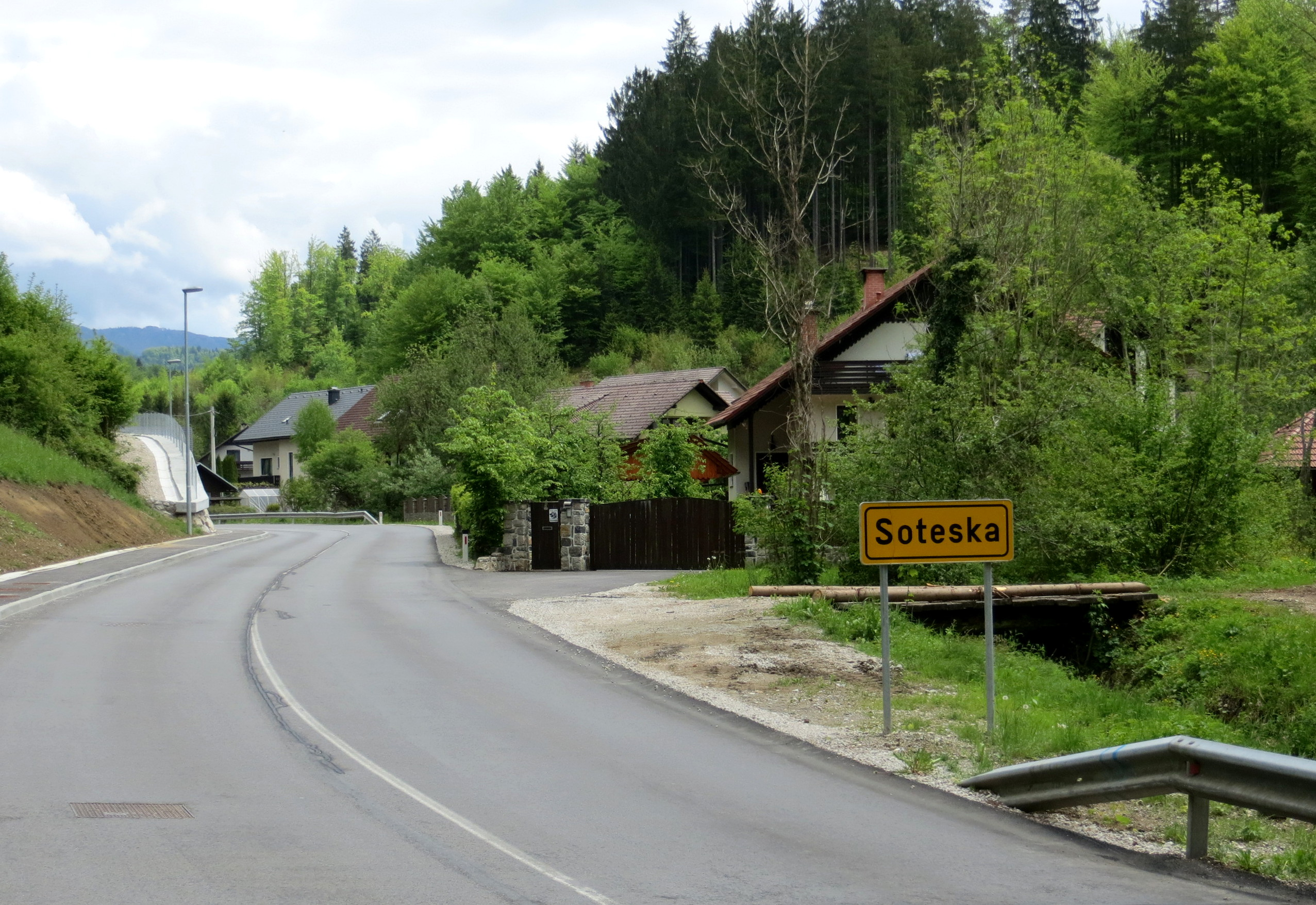

- Location in Slovenia
- Coordinates: 46°13′55.75″N 14°39′11.47″E
- Country: Slovenia
- Traditional region: Upper Carniola
- Statistical region: Central Slovenia
- Municipality: Kamnik

Area
  - Total: 2.28 km^{2} (0.88 sq mi)
- Elevation: 415.6 m (1,364 ft)

Population (2002)
  - Total: 283

Soteska (pronounced [sɔˈteːska]; literally, 'gorge') is a village in the Municipality of Kamnik in the Upper Carniola region of Slovenia. It lies in a side valley at the point where the Nevljica River exits the Tuhinj Valley through a gorge, from which it also gets its name. The main road from Kamnik into the Tuhinj Valley runs through the settlement.
