= Dragomelj =

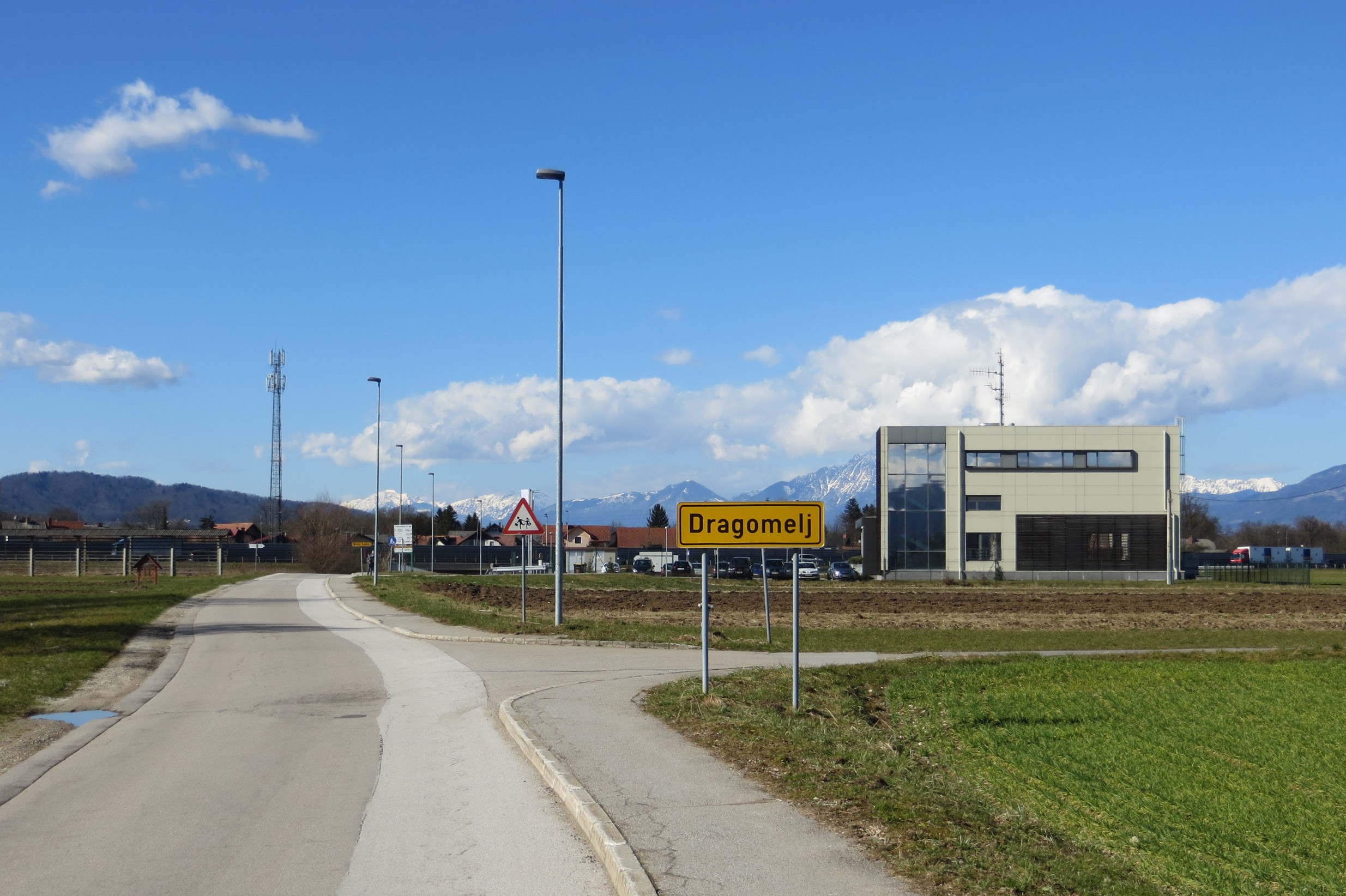

- Location in Slovenia
- Coordinates: 46°6′33.53″N 14°35′28.36″E
- Country: Slovenia
- Traditional region: Upper Carniola
- Statistical region: Central Slovenia
- Municipality: Domžale

Area
  - Total: 3.21 km^{2} (1.24 sq mi)
- Elevation: 285.3 m (936 ft)

Population (2020)
  - Total: 913
  - Density: 284/km^{2} (737/sq mi)

Dragomelj (pronounced [dɾaˈɡoːməl]; German: Dragomel) is a settlement northeast of Ljubljana in Slovenia. It lies in the Municipality of Domžale in the Upper Carniola region.

== Geography ==
Dragomelj is a compact settlement at the transition between the loamy soil along the Pšata River to the east and Soteska Hill (405 meters or 1,329 feet) to the west. The land to the north consists of low-lying damp meadows and a few tilled fields.

== Name ==
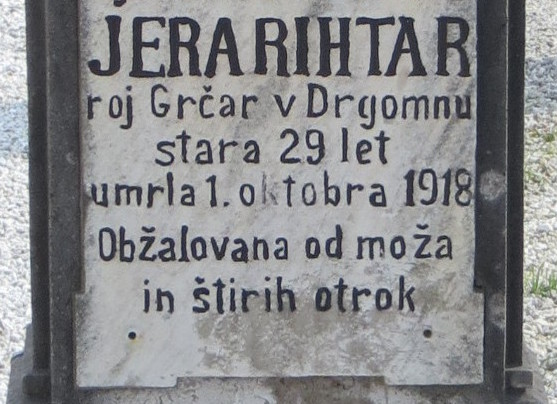
Gravestone with an archaic name: "Jera Rihtar née Grčar in Drgomen ..."

Dragomelj was attested in written sources in 1312 as Dragoͤmel, and later as Dragemel (1359), Dragomyn (1458), Dragomel (1490), Dragembl (1588), and Dergomen (1687). The toponym is derived from a possessive form of the Slavic personal name *Dragomъ, with the elliptical meaning 'Dragomъ's (village)'.

== History ==
Straw plaiting was an important industry in Dragomelj before the First World War. A fish farm was established in the southeast part of the village, along Gobovšek Creek, in 1933. A school was established in Dragomelj in 1942; the Partisans burned the school on November 21, 1943. After the Second World War, water mains were installed in the village in 1949.

== Dragomelj Castle ==
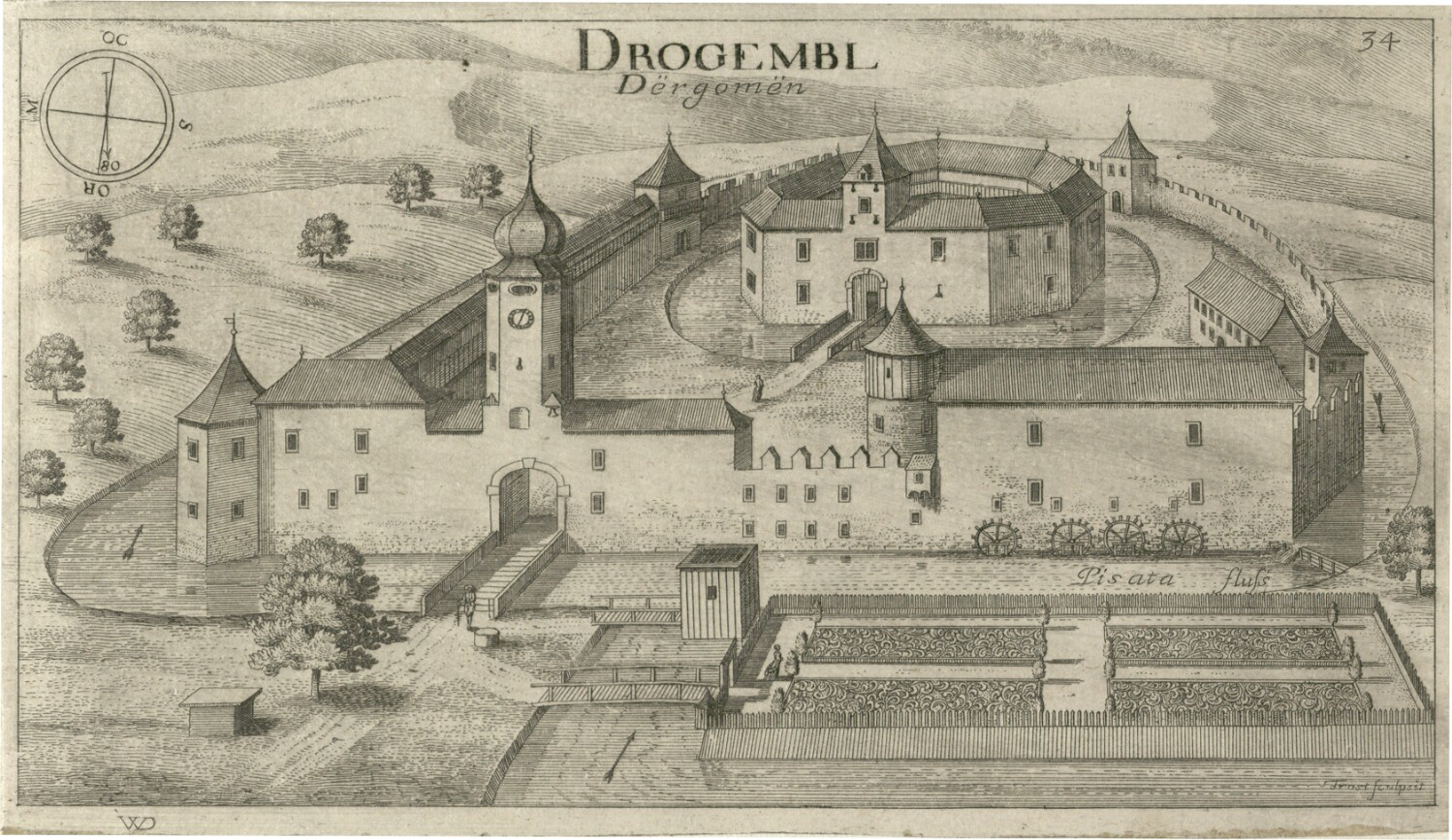
Dragomelj Castle in a 1679 engraving published by Johann Weikhard von Valvasor

A castle was first mentioned in Dragomelj in 1411; it developed from a manor house (attested in 1312) or fortified tower (attested in 1386) in the village. It stood next to the mill along Pšata Creek in the hamlet of Škotin in the southern part of the village. The castle was fortified with a moat to resist Ottoman raids and successfully resisted such an attack in 1528. The castle burned in the early 19th century, and only remnants of its embankment and moat remain.

== Notable people ==
Notable people that were born or lived in Dragomelj include:

- Alojzij (Lojze) Bolta (1923–1998), archaeologist
- Rezka Dragar (1913–1941), communist and People's Hero of Yugoslavia
