= Podgorci =

Podgorci may refer to:

- Podgorci, Rovišće, Croatia
- Podgorci, Struga, North Macedonia
- Podgorci, Ormož, Slovenia
