= Podgorica pri Pečah =

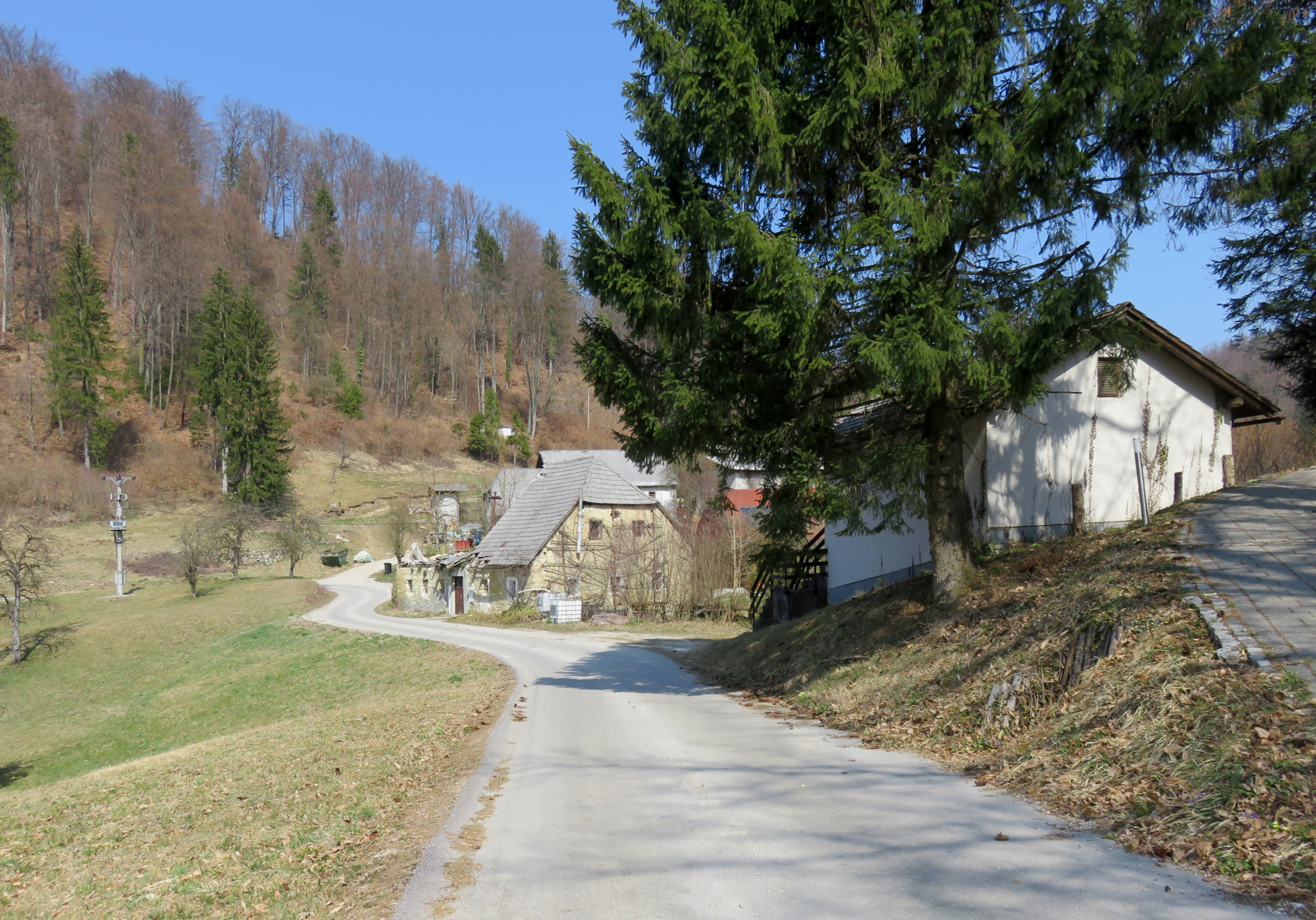

- Location in Slovenia
- Coordinates: 46°8′21.9″N 14°49′28.16″E
- Country: Slovenia
- Traditional region: Upper Carniola
- Statistical region: Central Slovenia
- Municipality: Moravče

Area
  - Total: 1.71 km^{2} (0.66 sq mi)
- Elevation: 465.8 m (1,528 ft)

Population (2002)
  - Total: 43
- Postal code: 1251

Podgorica pri Pečah (pronounced [pɔdɡɔˈɾiːtsa pɾi ˈpeːtʃax]) is a settlement south of Peče in the Municipality of Moravče in central Slovenia. The area is part of the traditional region of Upper Carniola. It is now included with the rest of the municipality in the Central Slovenia Statistical Region.

== Name ==
Podgorica pri Pečah was attested in historical sources as Puͤchel in 1386 and Poͤdgoricz in 1387, among other spellings. The name of the settlement was changed from Podgorica to Podgorica pri Pečah in 1955.
