= Črnuče =

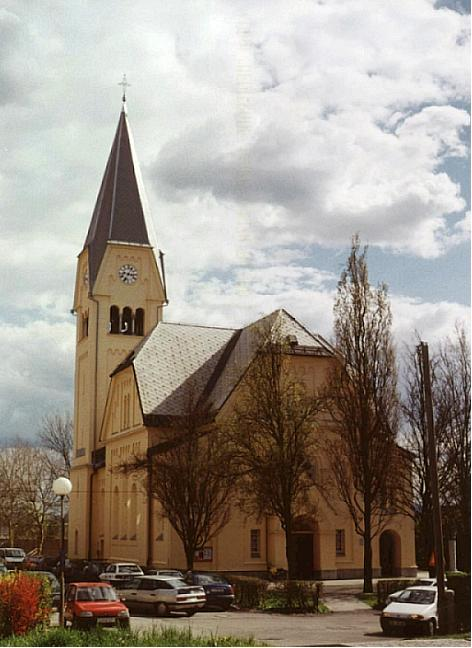
- Sts. Simon and Jude the Apostle Church

- Location in Slovenia
- Coordinates: 46°06′17″N 14°31′57″E
- Country: Slovenia
- Traditional region: Upper Carniola
- Statistical region: Central Slovenia
- Municipality: Ljubljana
- Elevation: 298 m (978 ft)

Črnuče (pronounced [tʃəɾˈnuːtʃɛ]; German: Tschernutsch) is a former town in the northern part of Ljubljana, the capital of Slovenia. It lies on the left bank of the Sava River. It is part of the traditional region of Upper Carniola and is now included with the rest of the municipality in the Central Slovenia Statistical Region.

== Name ==
Črnuče was attested in written sources in 1322 as Zternuͦtss (and as Zernuschcz in 1345, Zernuͤcz in 1362, and Zarnusch in 1439, among other spellings). In the past, the German name was Tschernutsch. The name is derived from the plural demonym *Čьrnuťane, based on the Slavic personal name *Čьrnutъ, presumably referring to an early inhabitant of the place.

== History ==
The remains of a prehistoric fortification with embankments were discovered at Tabor Hill (370 m), testifying to early settlement of the area. A prehistoric fort has also been identified south of this at Gradišče. At the site of the current bridge across the Sava River, a Roman bridge was supported by 26 piles. The Romans' Sava Fluvia station, marked on the Peutinger Map, is believed to have stood at this site. Firing trenches dating to 1813, used to guard the bridge during the Napoleonic Wars, are still preserved. The lower part of a French gravestone from this time can also be found along a path in the woods to Spodnje Gameljne.

Črnuče annexed the former villages of Gmajna and Podboršt in 1953. Črnuče was annexed by the City of Ljubljana in 1979, ending its existence as an independent settlement.

== Church ==
The church in Črnuče is dedicated to Saints Simon and Jude. It was first mentioned in written sources in 1526. The church was remodeled in the Baroque style in 1743. It was elevated to a vicariate in 1764 and a parish in 1875. The church was damaged in the 1895 Ljubljana earthquake, and a new neo-Romanesque church was built based on plans by the Austrian architect Raimund Jeblinger (1853–1937). The new church was completed in 1897. The church includes a baptismal chapel designed by Jože Plečnik and stations of the cross from the workshop of Leopold Layer (1752–1828). The interior of the church was painted by Anton Jebačin (1850–1927).

== Notable people ==
Notable people who were born or lived in Črnuče include:

- Janez Pečar (born 1924), lawyer and criminologist
- Franc Ravbar (1913–1943), communist and Partisan fighter
- Jože Strgar (born 1929), former Ljubljana mayor
- Džoni Novak (born 1969), footballer
