= Vrhpolje =

Vrhpolje may refer to:

In Serbia:

- Vrhpolje, Serbia

In Slovenia:

- Vrhpolje pri Moravčah
- Vrhpolje, Vipava
- Vrhpolje, Hrpelje-Kozina
- Vrhpolje pri Kamniku
- Vrhpolje pri Šentvidu

In Bosnia-Herzegovina:

- Vrhpolje, Sanski Most
- Vrhpolje, Zenica
