= Hrastje =

Hrastje may refer to:

In Croatia:

- Hrastje, Croatia, a village in the Municipality of Sveti Ivan Zelina

In Slovenia:

- Hrastje, Kranj, a settlement in the Municipality of Kranj
- Hrastje (Ljubljana), a former settlement in the Urban Municipality of Ljubljana
- Hrastje, Maribor, a settlement in the Municipality of Maribor
- Hrastje, Šentjernej, a settlement in the Municipality of Šentjernej
- Hrastje, Šentjur, a settlement in the Municipality of Šentjur
- Hrastje–Mota, a settlement in the Municipality of Radenci
- Hrastje ob Bistrici, a former settlement in the Municipality of Bistrica ob Sotli
- Hrastje pri Cerkljah, a settlement in the Municipality of Brežice
- Hrastje pri Grosupljem, a settlement in the Municipality of Grosuplje
- Hrastje pri Mirni Peči, a settlement in the Municipality of Mirna Peč
