= Šmartno =

Šmartno may refer to any of several places in Slovenia:

- Podsmreka, Dobrova–Polhov Gradec, a village in the Municipality of Dobrova–Polhov Gradec (known locally as Šmartno), central Slovenia
- Šmartno, a village in the Municipality of Brda, southwestern Slovenia
- Šmartno, a village in the Municipality of Cerklje na Gorenjskem, northwestern Slovenia
- Šmartno na Pohorju, a village in the Municipality of Slovenska Bistrica, northeastern Slovenia
- Šmartno ob Dreti, a village in the Municipality of Nazarje, northeastern Slovenia
- Šmartno ob Paki, a settlement and a small municipality, northeastern Slovenia
- Šmartno ob Savi, a formerly independent settlement, now part of Ljubljana, central Slovenia
- Šmartno pod Šmarno Goro, a formerly independent settlement, now part of Ljubljana, central Slovenia
- Šmartno pri Litiji, a town and a municipality, central Slovenia
- Šmartno pri Slovenj Gradcu, a settlement in the Municipality of Slovenj Gradec, northern Slovenia
- Šmartno v Rožni Dolini, a settlement in the Municipality of Celje, central-eastern Slovenia
- Šmartno v Tuhinju, a village in the Municipality of Kamnik, northern Slovenia
