= Stebljevek =

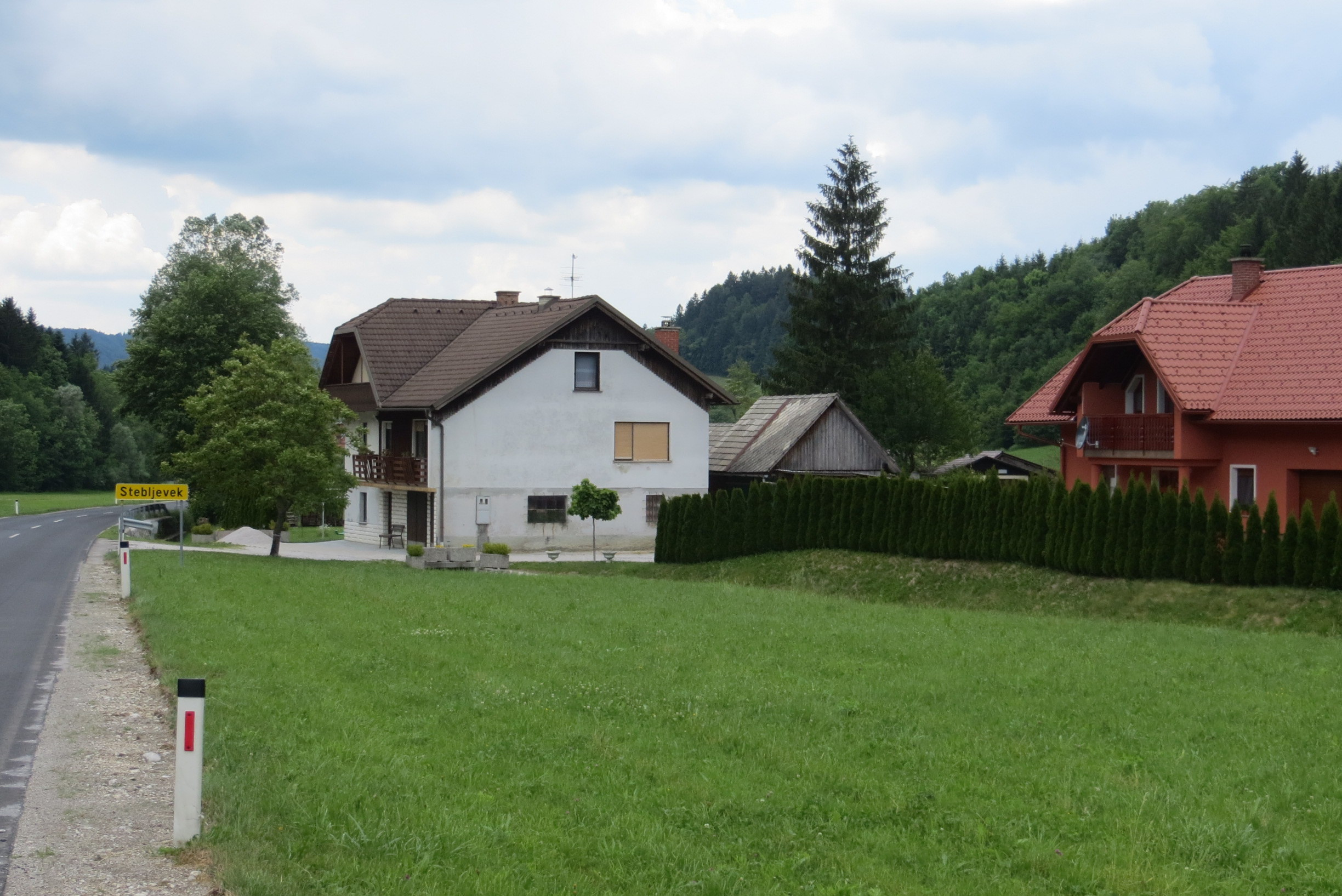

- Location in Slovenia
- Coordinates: 46°12′57.66″N 14°44′40.33″E
- Country: Slovenia
- Traditional region: Upper Carniola
- Statistical region: Central Slovenia
- Municipality: Kamnik

Area
  - Total: 1.27 km^{2} (0.49 sq mi)
- Elevation: 532.6 m (1,747 ft)

Population (2022)
  - Total: 52

Stebljevek (pronounced [stɛˈbljeːʋək]) is a small dispersed settlement next to Šmartno v Tuhinju in the Tuhinj Valley in the Municipality of Kamnik in the Upper Carniola region of Slovenia.
