= Zgornji Motnik =

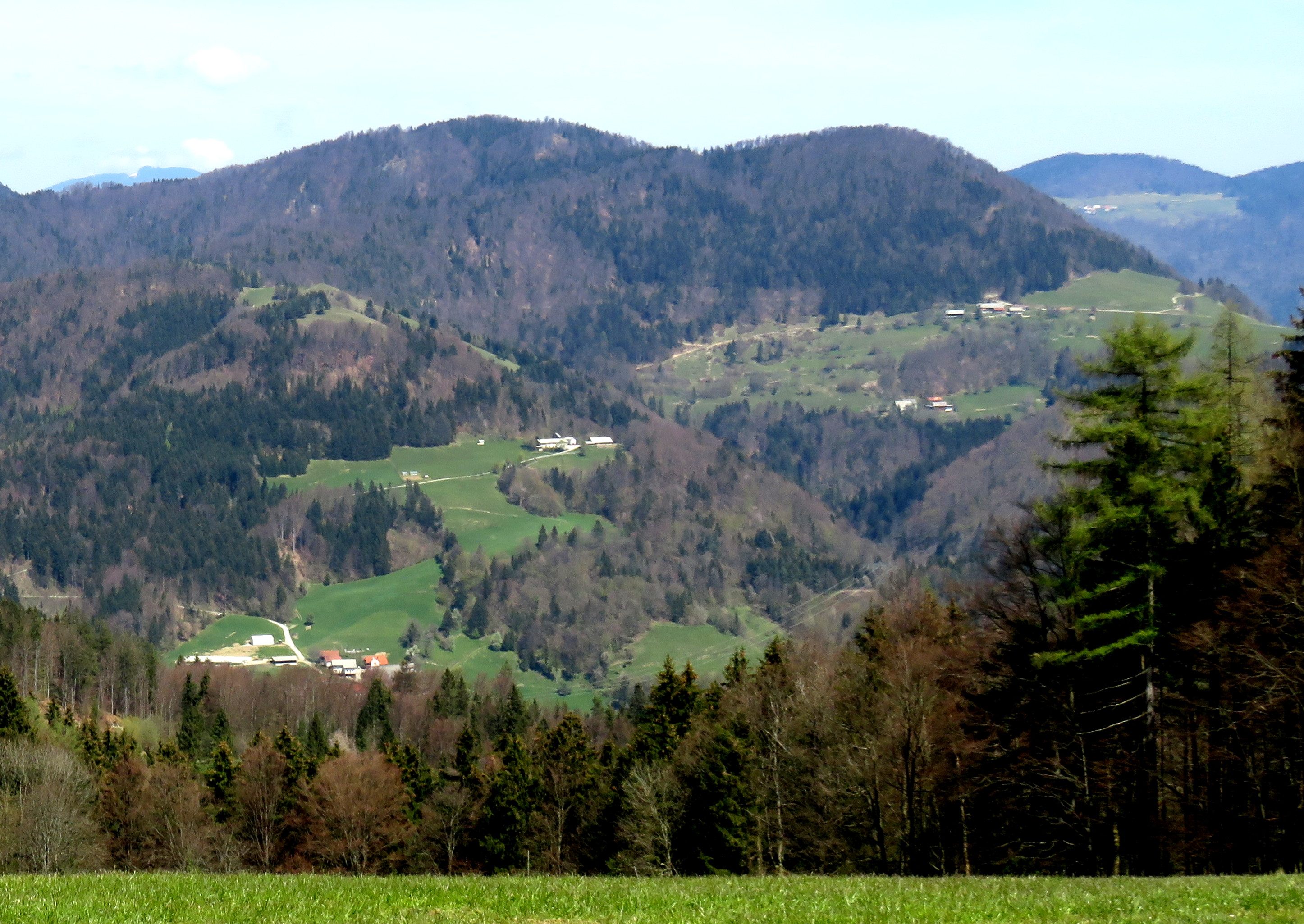

- Location in Slovenia
- Coordinates: 46°13′11.81″N 14°54′10.49″E
- Country: Slovenia
- Traditional region: Upper Carniola
- Statistical region: Central Slovenia
- Municipality: Kamnik

Area
  - Total: 4.65 km^{2} (1.80 sq mi)
- Elevation: 501.9 m (1,647 ft)

Population (2002)
  - Total: 71

Zgornji Motnik (pronounced [ˈzɡoːɾnji mɔˈtniːk]; German: Obermöttnig) is a dispersed settlement in the hills north of Motnik in the Tuhinj Valley in the Municipality of Kamnik in the Upper Carniola region of Slovenia. It includes the hamlets of Bela, Koprivše, Srobotno, Vrh, and Brezovica.
