= Pšajnovica =

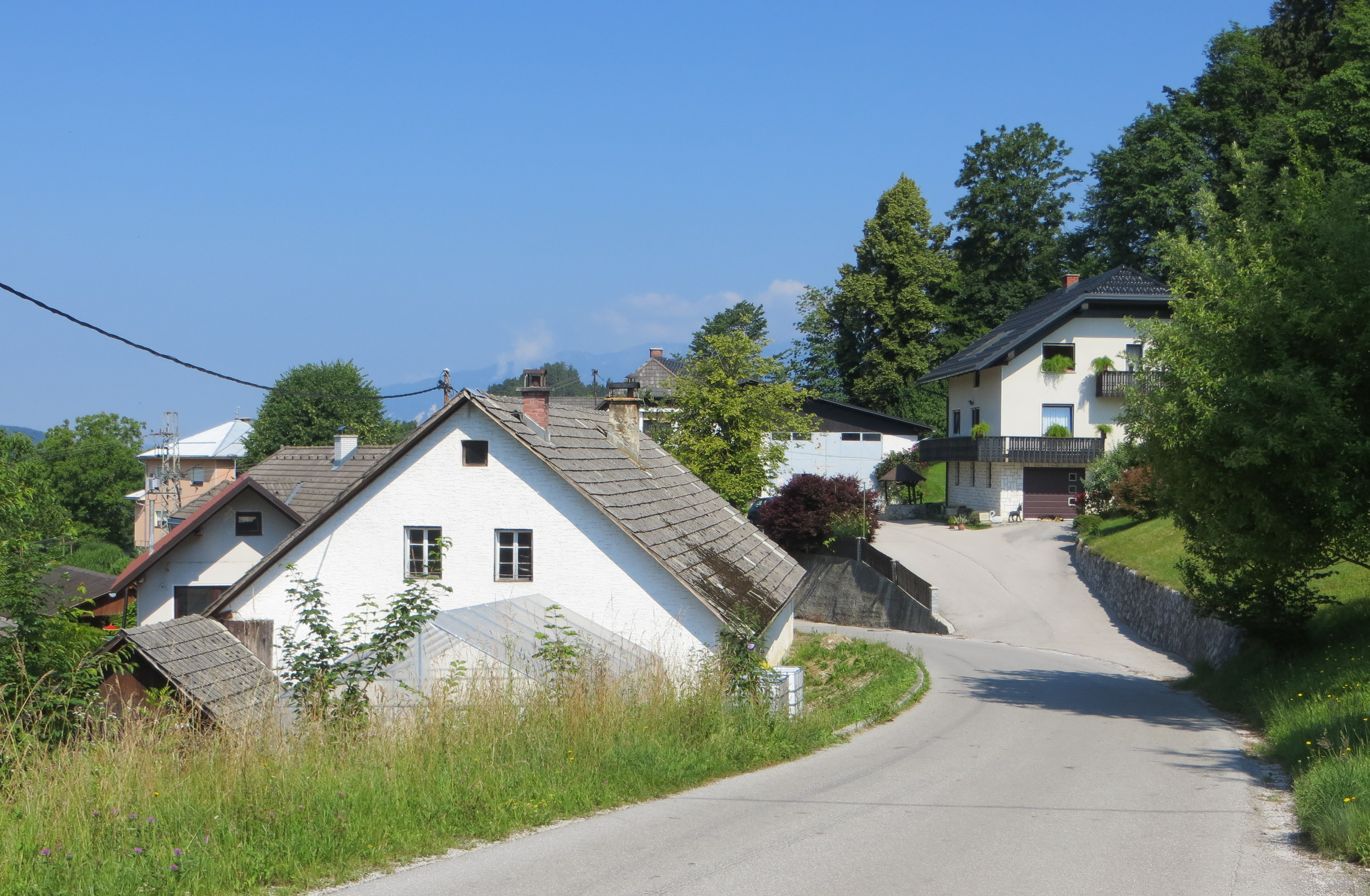

- Location in Slovenia
- Coordinates: 46°12′12″N 14°44′55″E
- Country: Slovenia
- Traditional region: Upper Carniola
- Statistical region: Central Slovenia
- Municipality: Kamnik

Area
  - Total: 0.89 km^{2} (0.34 sq mi)
- Elevation: 656 m (2,152 ft)

Population (2002)
  - Total: 64

Pšajnovica (pronounced [ˈpʃaːi̯nɔʋitsa]; in older sources also Pišajnovica, German: Pischainowitz) is a small settlement in the Tuhinj Valley in the Municipality of Kamnik in the Upper Carniola region of Slovenia.

== Church ==
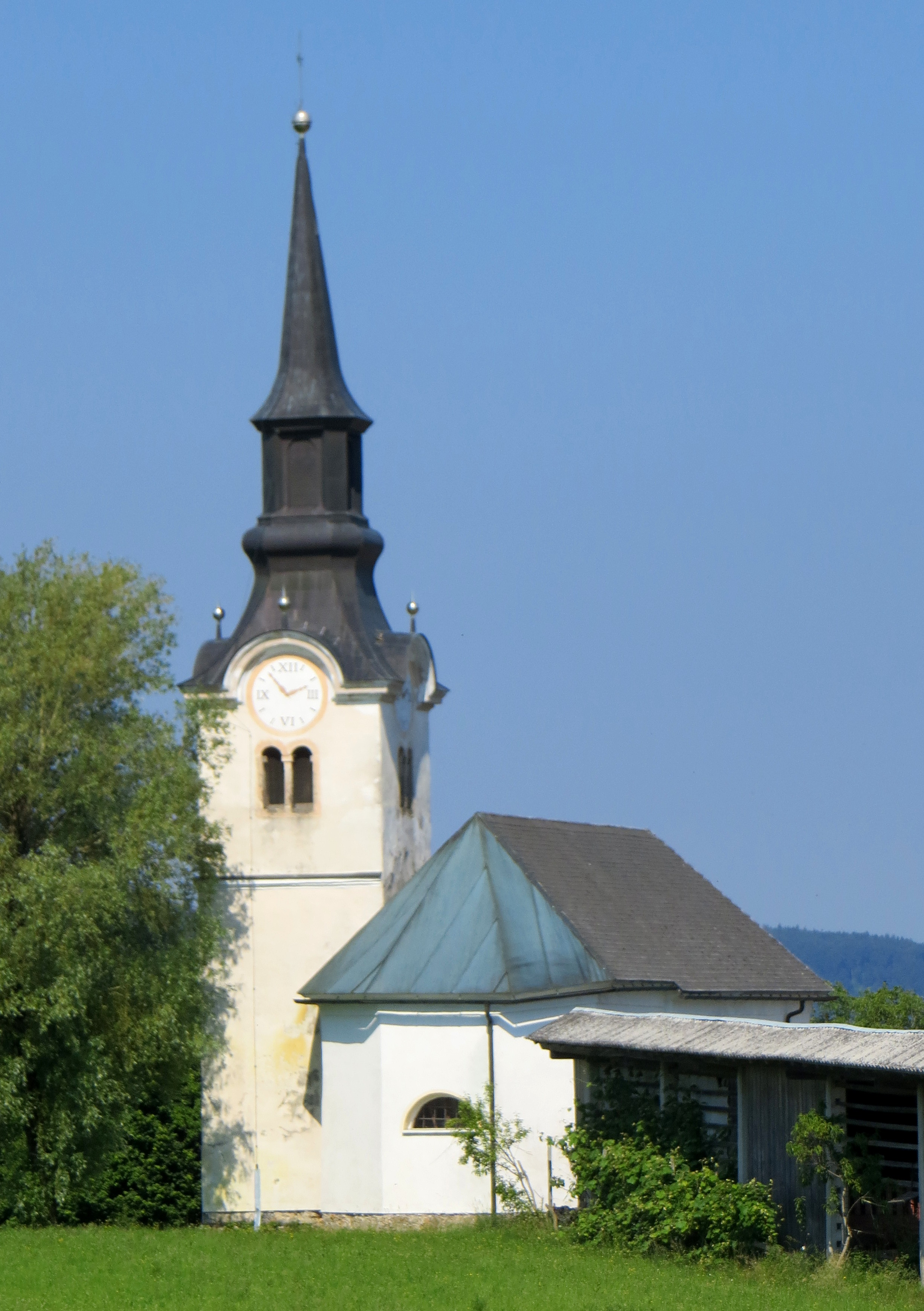
Saint Leonard's Church

The local church is dedicated to Saint Leonard.
