= Draževnik =

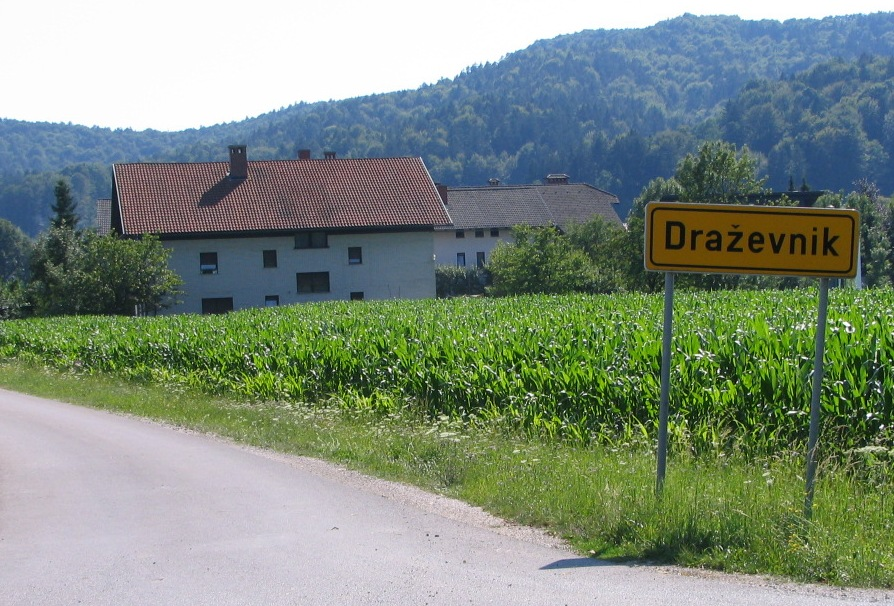

- Location in Slovenia
- Coordinates: 46°2′50.09″N 14°25′38.29″E
- Country: Slovenia
- Traditional region: Upper Carniola
- Statistical region: Central Slovenia
- Municipality: Dobrova–Polhov Gradec

Area
  - Total: 1.37 km^{2} (0.53 sq mi)
- Elevation: 313 m (1,027 ft)

Population (2020)
  - Total: 139
  - Density: 101/km^{2} (263/sq mi)

Draževnik (pronounced [ˈdɾaːʒɛwnik]) is a small settlement southeast of Dobrova in the Municipality of Dobrova–Polhov Gradec in the Upper Carniola region of Slovenia.

== Name ==
The name Draževnik, like similar toponyms (e.g., Draža vas, Draženci, Dražgoše), is probably derived from a Slavic personal name (such as *Dragъ/Drago, *Dražigojь, *Dražigostь) and likely refers to an early inhabitant of the place. In the past it was known as Draschounik in German.

== History ==
On 18 November 1942 Italian forces killed several villagers from Draževnik in nearby Podsmreka.
