= Laze v Tuhinju =

- Village
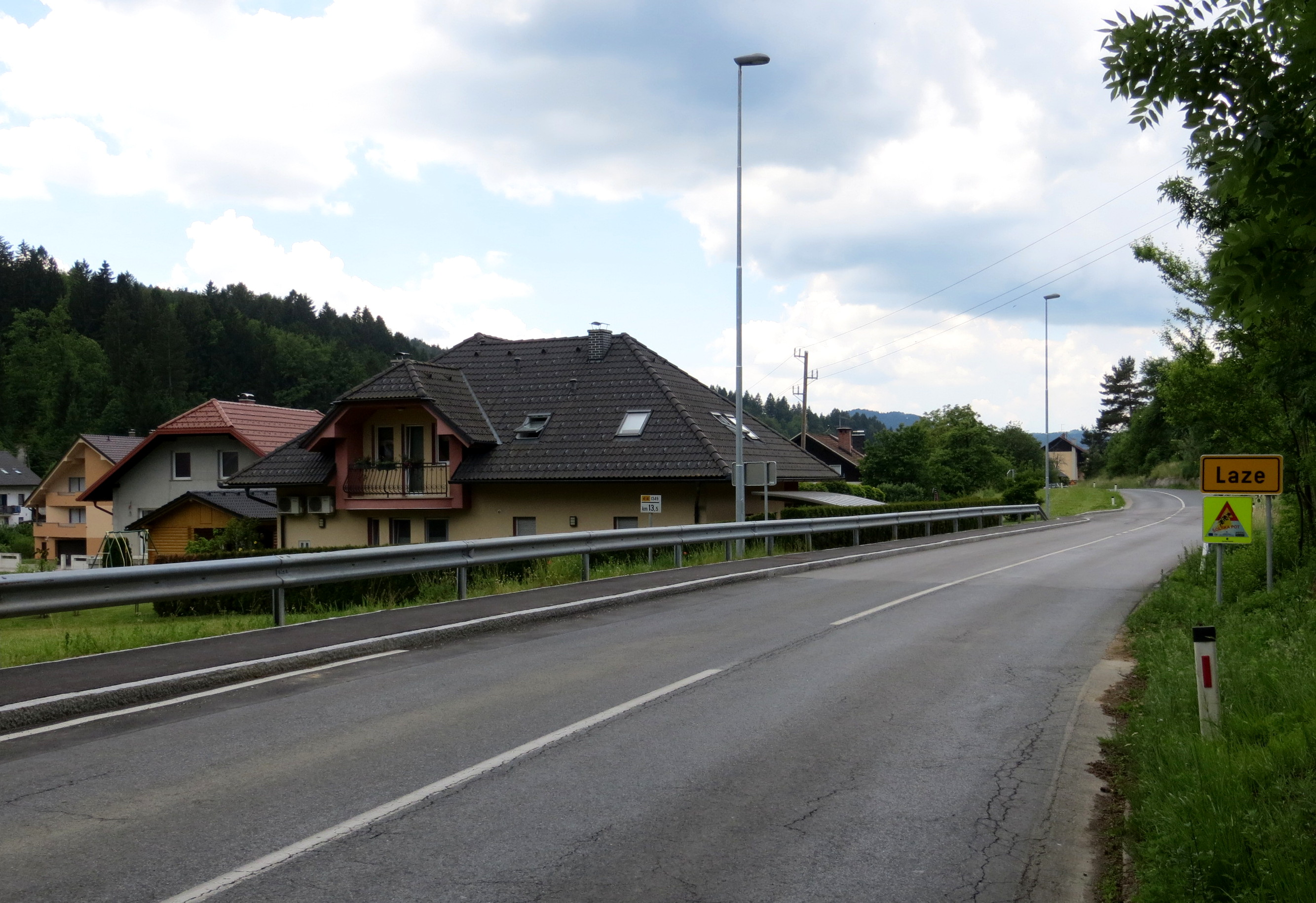

- Location in Slovenia
- Coordinates: 46°13′7.82″N 14°45′37.21″E
- Country: Slovenia
- Traditional region: Upper Carniola
- Statistical region: Central Slovenia
- Municipality: Kamnik

Area
  - Total: 1.39 km^{2} (0.54 sq mi)
- Elevation: 510.6 m (1,675 ft)

Population (2002)
  - Total: 224

Laze v Tuhinju (pronounced [ˈlaːzɛ ʍ tuˈxiːnju]; German: Laase) is a village in the Tuhinj Valley in the Municipality of Kamnik in the Upper Carniola region of Slovenia.

== Name ==
The name of the settlement was changed from Laze to Laze v Tuhinju in 1955. In the past the German name was Laase.

== Gallery ==
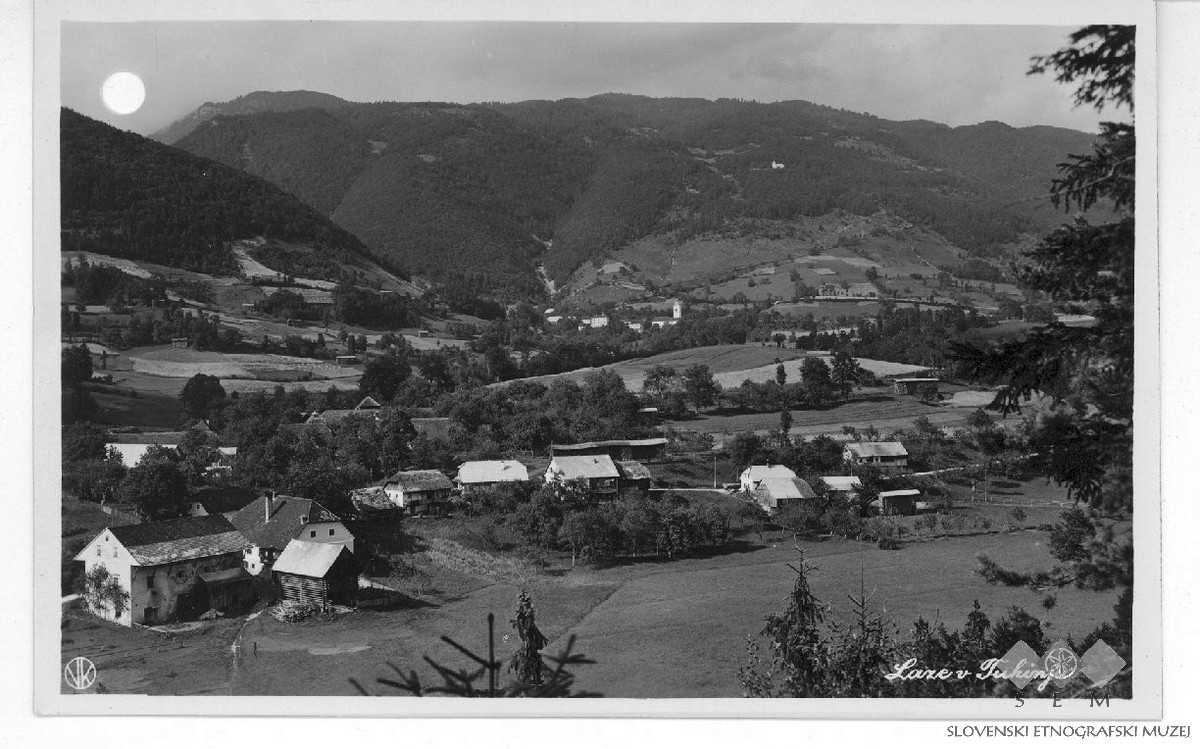
Historical postcard of Laze v Tuhinju
