= Vrhpolje pri Kamniku =

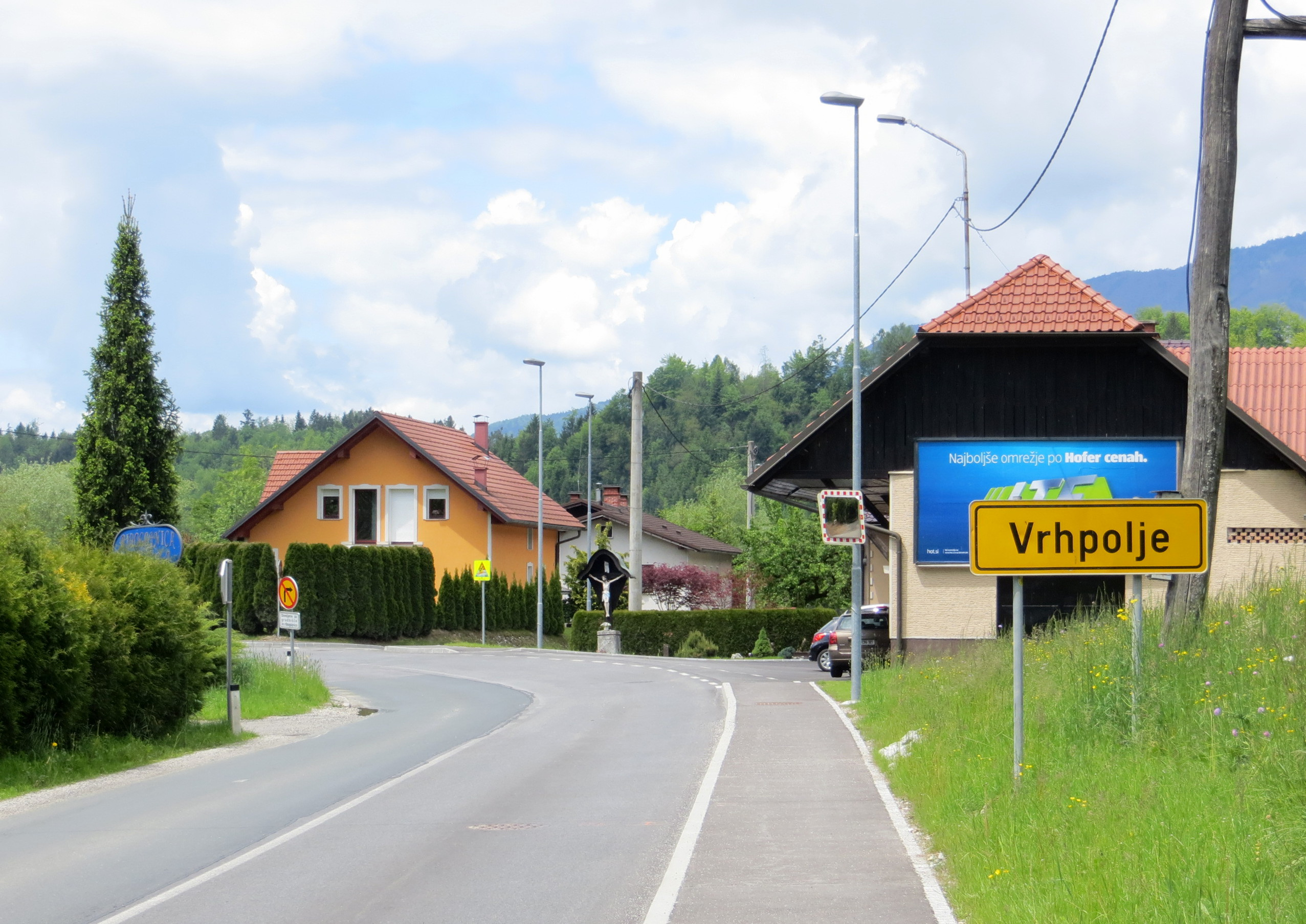

- Location in Slovenia
- Coordinates: 46°13′48.06″N 14°37′53.11″E
- Country: Slovenia
- Traditional region: Upper Carniola
- Statistical region: Central Slovenia
- Municipality: Kamnik

Area
  - Total: 0.94 km^{2} (0.36 sq mi)
- Elevation: 392.9 m (1,289 ft)

Population (2002)
  - Total: 664

Vrhpolje pri Kamniku (pronounced [ˈʋəɾxpɔljɛ pɾi ˈkaːmniku]; German: Oberfeld) is a settlement in the Municipality of Kamnik in the Upper Carniola region of Slovenia. Urban expansion has turned it into a single continuous settlement with the neighbouring settlement of Nevlje. The main road from Kamnik into the Tuhinj Valley runs through Vrhpolje.

== Name ==
The name of the settlement was changed from Vrhpolje to Vrhpolje pri Kamniku in 1955. In the past the German name was Oberfeld.

== Gallery ==
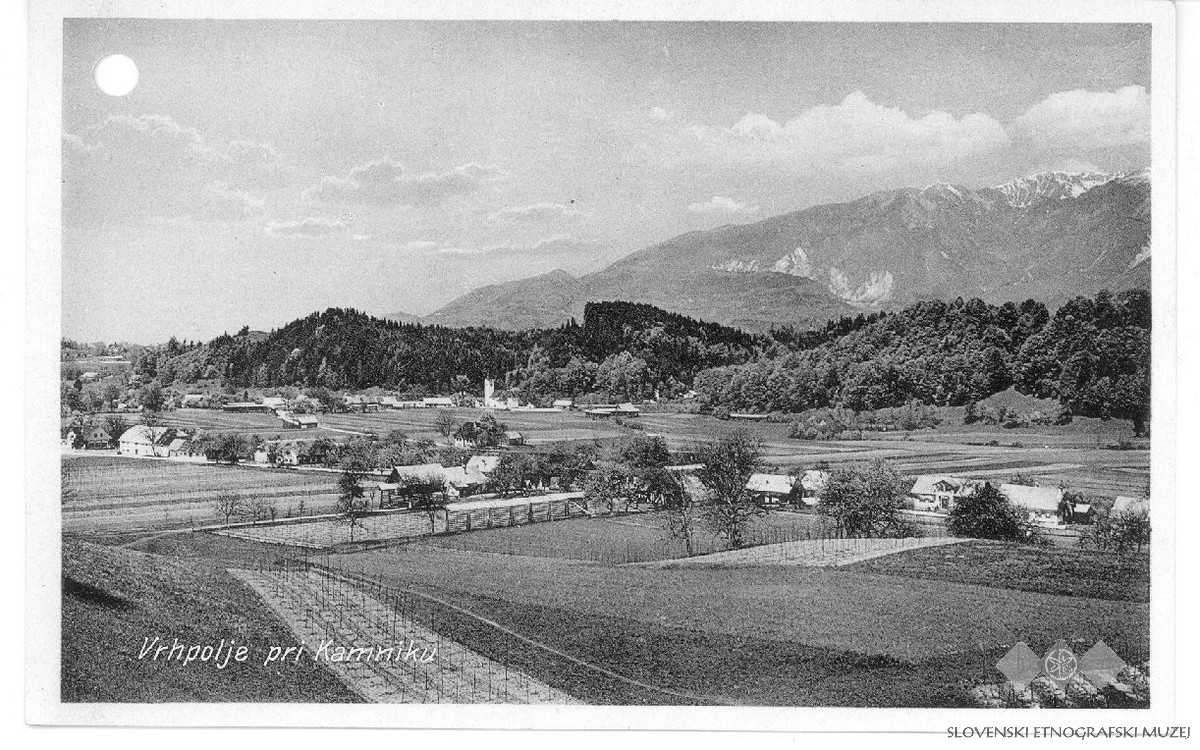
Historical postcard of Vrhpolje pri Kamniku
