= Hrastje (Ljubljana) =

- Location in Slovenia
- Coordinates: 46°4′32″N 14°33′50″E
- Country: Slovenia
- Traditional region: Upper Carniola
- Statistical region: Central Slovenia
- Municipality: Ljubljana
- Elevation: 290 m (950 ft)

Hrastje (pronounced [ˈxɾaːstjɛ]; German: Hrastie) is a formerly independent settlement in the northeast part of the capital Ljubljana in central Slovenia. It is part of the traditional region of Upper Carniola and is now included with the rest of the municipality in the Central Slovenia Statistical Region.

== Geography ==
Hrastje is a clustered settlement on a terrace above the Sava River along the road from Ljubljana to Šentjakob ob Savi. To the east, the settlement extends to Sneberje, and to the west to Šmartno ob Savi. It borders the Pehlica common to the south, and the Prod common and the Sava River to the north. The soil is gravelly, and there are meadows to the north.

== Name ==
The name Hrastje is derived from the Slovene common noun hrast 'oak', referring to the local vegetation.

== History ==
A Roman coin was discovered at house no. 13 in the village, attesting to early settlement in the area. Before the Second World War, a mimeograph workshop operated in the village, producing propaganda flyers.

Hrastje had a population of 63 living in 11 houses in 1869 and 78 living in 12 houses in 1900. Hrastje was annexed by the City of Ljubljana in 1982, ending its existence as an independent settlement.

== Notable people ==
Notable people that were born or lived in Hrastje include the following:

- Ivan Šiška (1861–1939), industrialist
