= Cirkuše v Tuhinju =

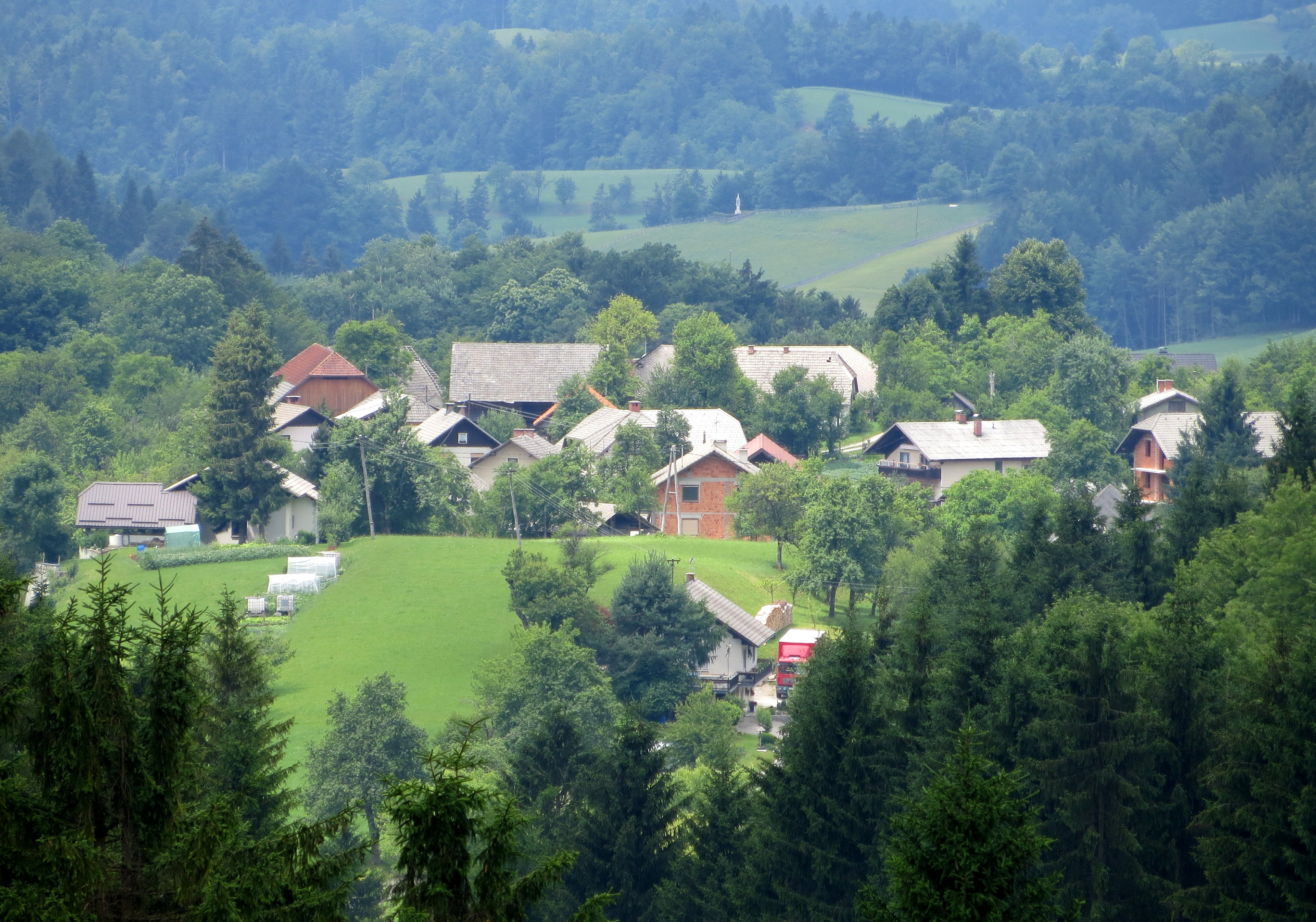

- Location in Slovenia
- Coordinates: 46°13′2.51″N 14°47′17.09″E
- Country: Slovenia
- Traditional region: Upper Carniola
- Statistical region: Central Slovenia
- Municipality: Kamnik
- Elevation: 589.8 m (1,935 ft)

Population (2002)
  - Total: 67

Cirkuše v Tuhinju (pronounced [ˈtsiːɾkuʃɛ ʍ tuˈxiːnju]) is a small settlement in the Tuhinj Valley in the Municipality of Kamnik in the Upper Carniola region of Slovenia.

== Name ==
The name of the settlement was changed from Cirkuše to Cirkuše v Tuhinju in 1955.
