= Motnik =

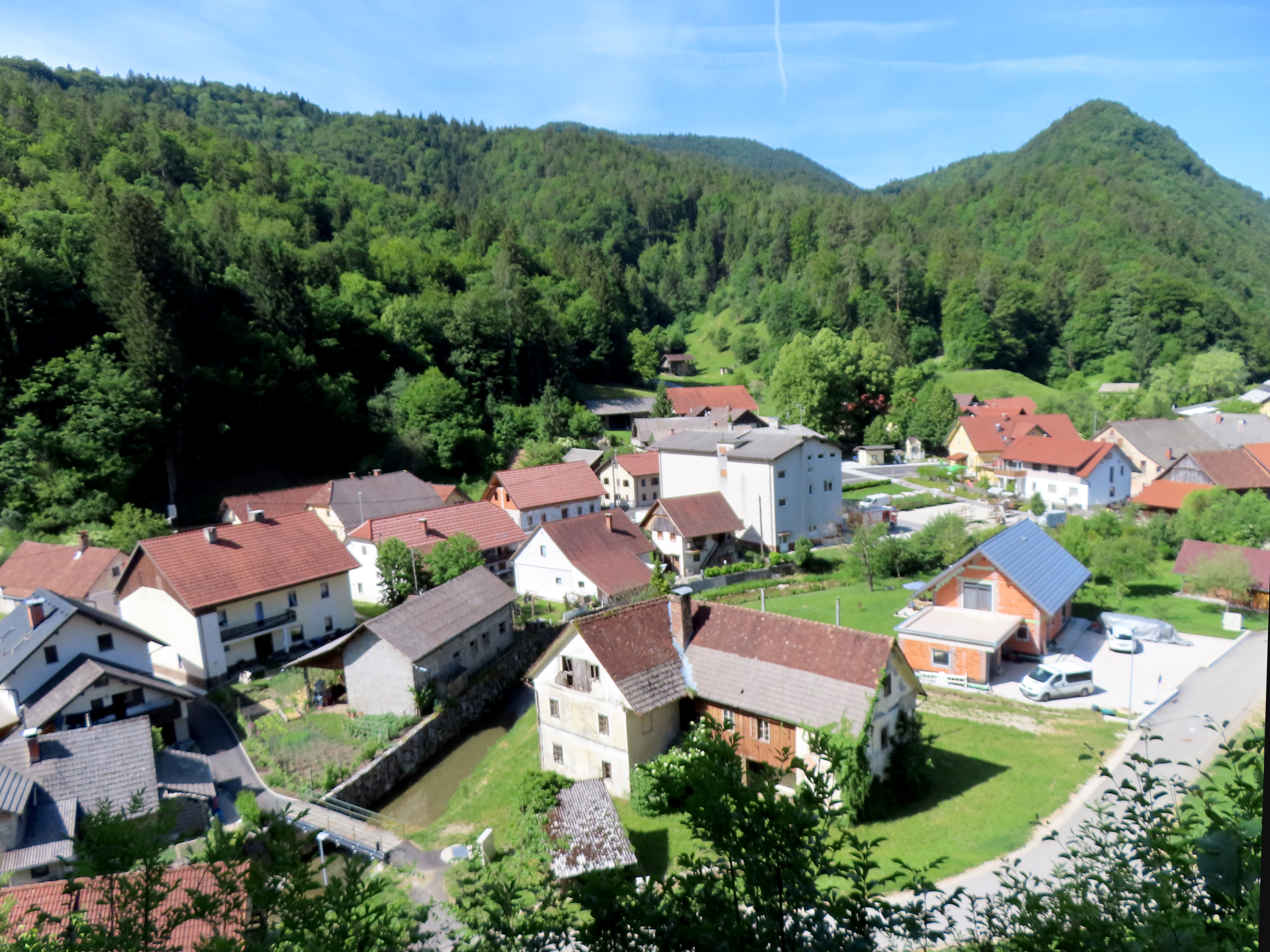

- Location in Slovenia
- Coordinates: 46°12′58.17″N 14°53′25.72″E
- Country: Slovenia
- Traditional region: Upper Carniola
- Statistical region: Central Slovenia
- Municipality: Kamnik

Area
  - Total: 2.27 km^{2} (0.88 sq mi)
- Elevation: 428.2 m (1,405 ft)

Population (2002)
  - Total: 163

Motnik (pronounced [mɔˈtniːk]; German: Möttnig) is a village in the Tuhinj Valley in the Municipality of Kamnik in the Upper Carniola region of Slovenia.

== Name ==
Mornik was attested in written sources in as Motnik in 1123, Motnich in 1247, Moͤtnik in 1340, and Mötnich in 1404. The name is believed to originally be a hydronym, *Mǫtьnikъ, derived from the adjective *mǫtьnъ 'turbid' or from the verb *mǫtiti 'to make turbid', thus referring to a stream with turbid water. Related names in Slovenia include various farms with the name Motnik and the Vodmat neighborhood in Ljubljana, as well as Serbo-Croatian Mutnik and Mutnica, and Czech Moutnice.

== Churches ==
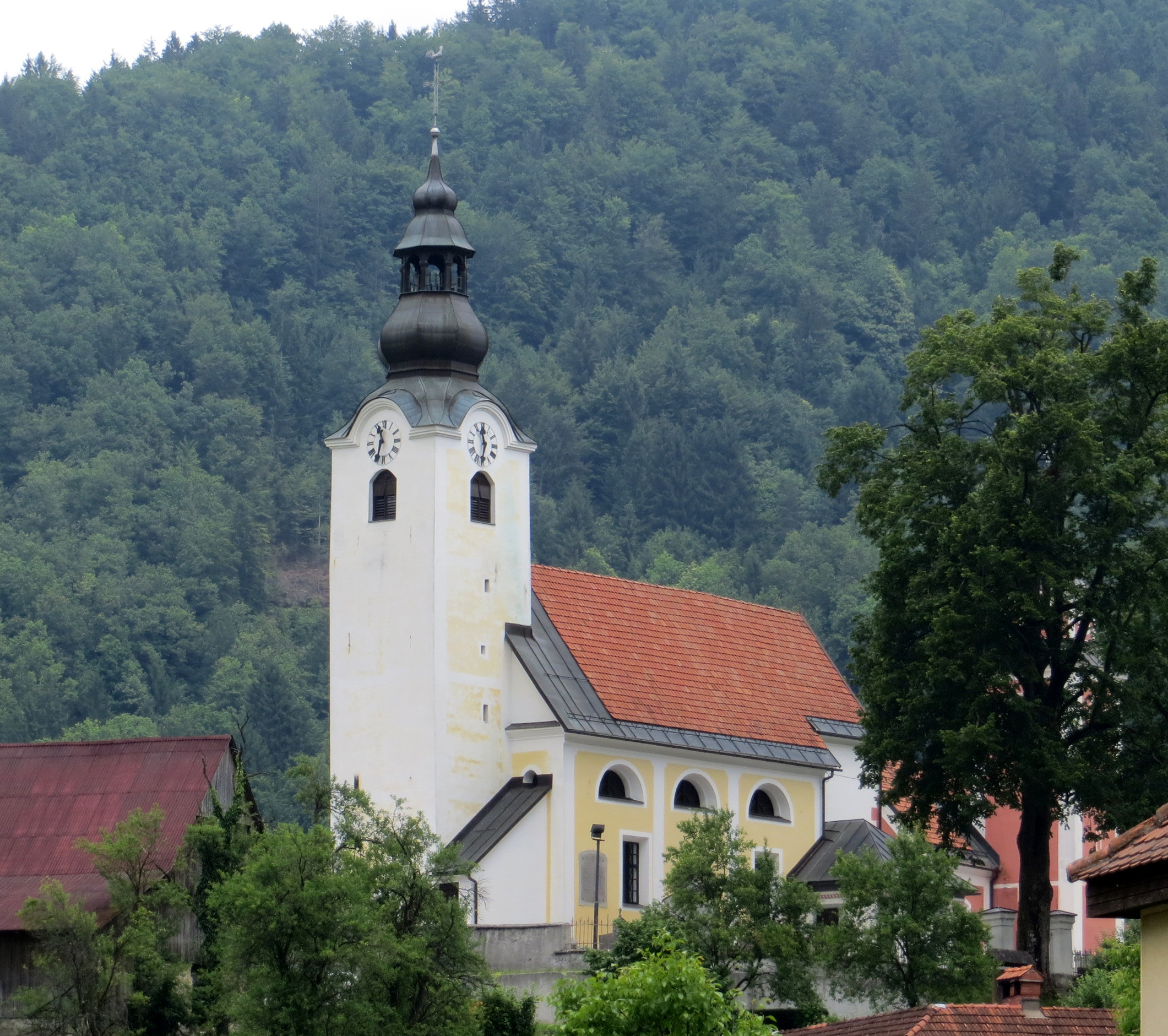
Saint George's Church

The parish church in Motnik is dedicated to Saint George and is a Baroque building with 19th-century furnishings. Close by is a smaller church, a cemetery chapel dedicated to Mary Magdalene.

== Motnik Castle ==
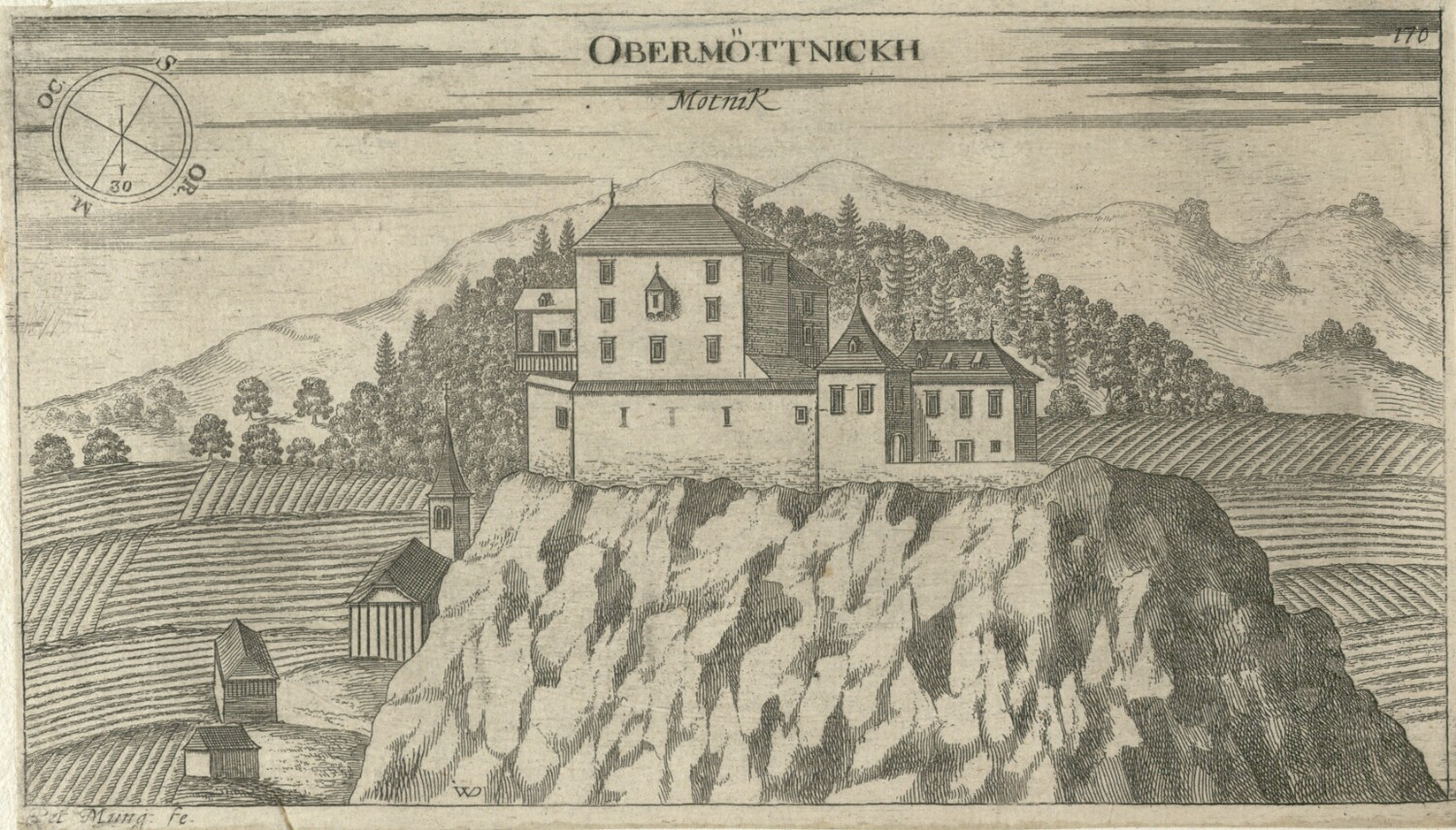
Depiction of Motnik Castle from 1679

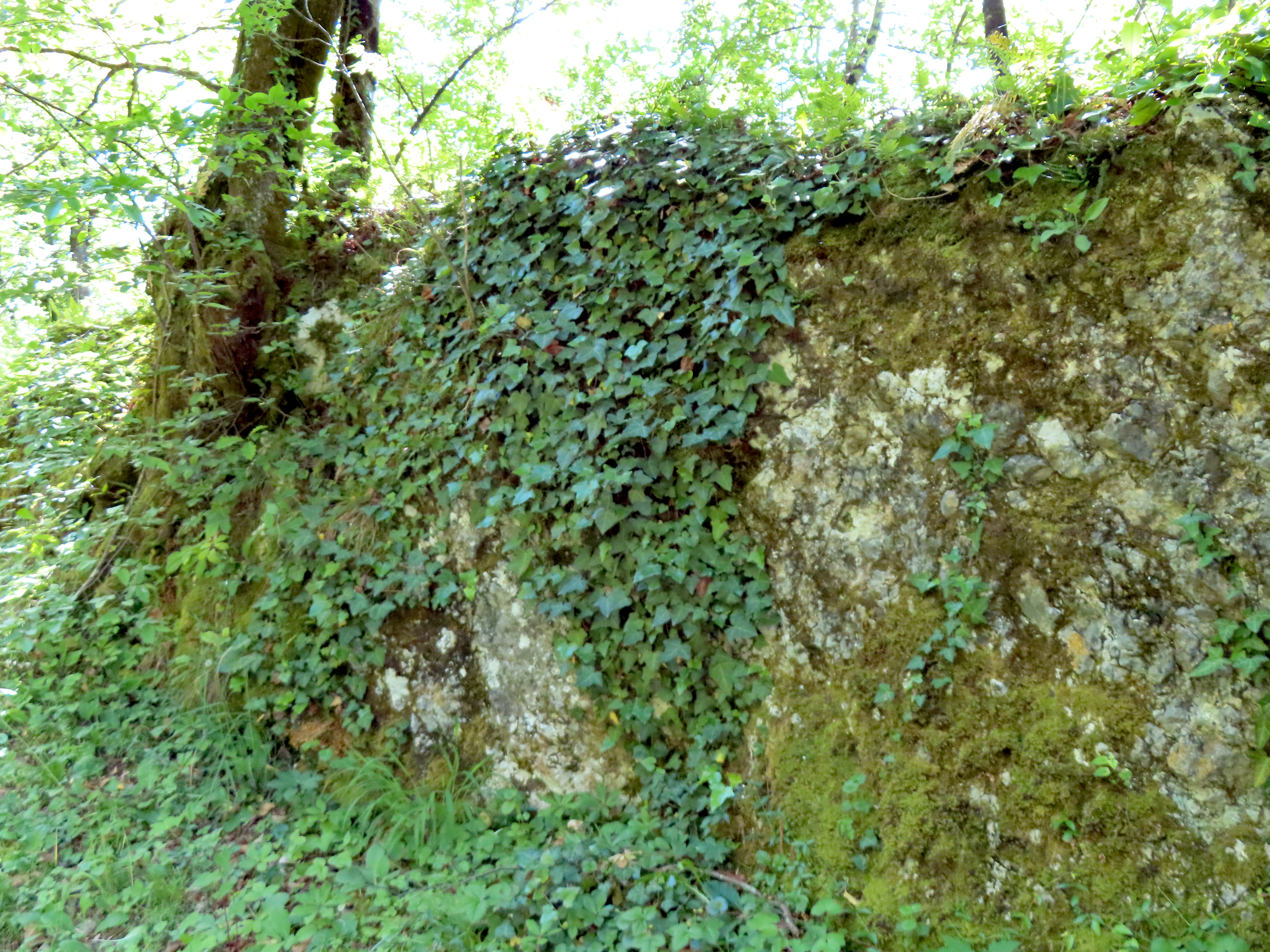
Southeastern wall remnant

The ruins of Motnik Castle are located on a rocky ridge above Motnik. The remnants consist of a defensive wall and the entry tower to the east, and the castle courtyard to the west, which indicates the layout of the residential area and some other buildings. The castle was probably built in the first half of the 13th century, and it was owned by the Lords of Motnik, ministeriales of the Counts of Andechs. The castle initially had a defensive role and served to control movement through the valley of Motnišnica Creek. In the 15th century, the castle passed into ownership of the related Lords of Pettau (Ptuj). It was destroyed by a fire in 1760.

== Pygmy rhinoceros ==
Close to the settlement is also an abandoned brown coal mine in which the fossilized remains of a pygmy rhinoceros were discovered in 1910. They were found to be 25 million years old and are now displayed in a small museum in the village.

== Coal mine ==
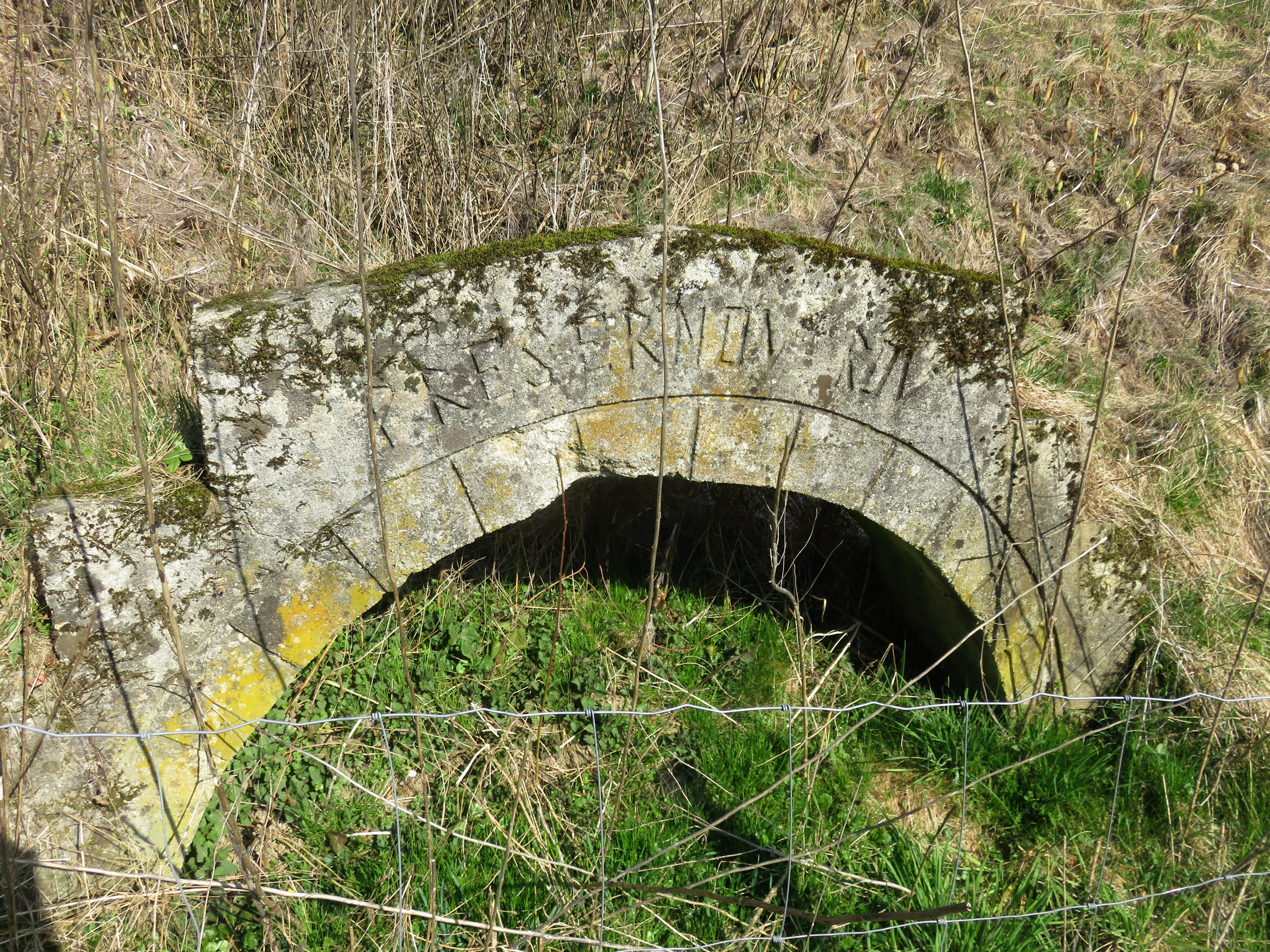
The Prešeren Shaft arch

The Prešeren Shaft (Slovene: Prešernov rov) was the lower entrance into a lignite mine in Motnik, from which brown coal was periodically extracted from 1855 to 1951. Only the stone arch of the entry to the shaft, with the name of the shaft carved into it, now remains.
