= Podsmreka, Dobrova–Polhov Gradec =

Podsmreka Šmartno (local name)
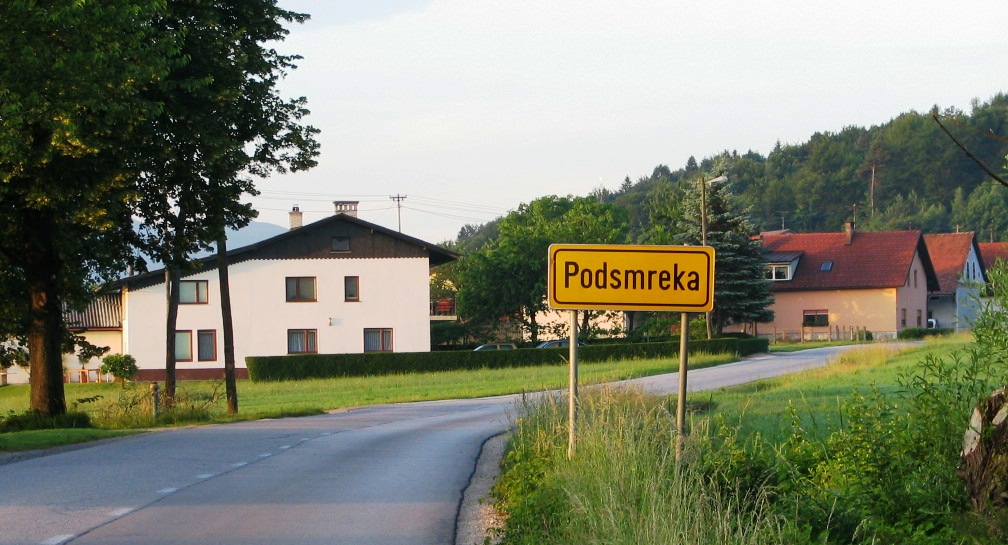

- Location in Slovenia
- Coordinates: 46°2′23.23″N 14°25′41.36″E
- Country: Slovenia
- Traditional region: Upper Carniola
- Statistical region: Central Slovenia
- Municipality: Dobrova–Polhov Gradec

Area
  - Total: 3.21 km^{2} (1.24 sq mi)
- Elevation: 323.2 m (1,060 ft)

Population (2020)
  - Total: 448
  - Density: 140/km^{2} (361/sq mi)

Podsmreka (pronounced [pɔtˈsmɾeːka]; in older sources also Podsmreko, German: Podsmerek) is a village south of Dobrova in the Municipality of Dobrova–Polhov Gradec in the Upper Carniola region of Slovenia.

== Geography ==
Podsmreka lies on a terrace on the road from Dobrova to Brezovica pri Ljubljani. To the west it extends up the ridge known as Fat Hill (Slovene: Debeli hrib), including Kamenščica (or Kamnišca) Hill (461 m) and Kopavnik (or Strmec) Hill (377 m). To the east it extends to the hamlet of Žeje.

== Name ==
Podsmreka was attested in historical sources as Sand Mertein 'Saint Martin' in 1414 and sand Mertten pey der Tannen 'Saint Martin by the fir tree' in 1448, among other spellings. The name Podsmreka is derived from a prepositional phrase in which the noun has lost its case ending: pod 'below' + smreka 'spruce'. The name therefore means 'below the spruce (forest)' and, like similar names (e.g., Podsmrečje, Smrečno), originally referred to the local vegetation. The name can also be found spelled Podsmereka in some sources. Locally the village is also known as Šmartno 'Saint Martin' because of the local church. In the past it was known as Podsmerek in German.

== History ==
On 18 November 1942 Italian forces killed a number of hostages from the neighboring settlement of Draževnik below Kamenščica Hill.

The economy of the village was traditionally tied to vegetable production, raising livestock, and dairy farming for the market in Ljubljana.

== Church ==
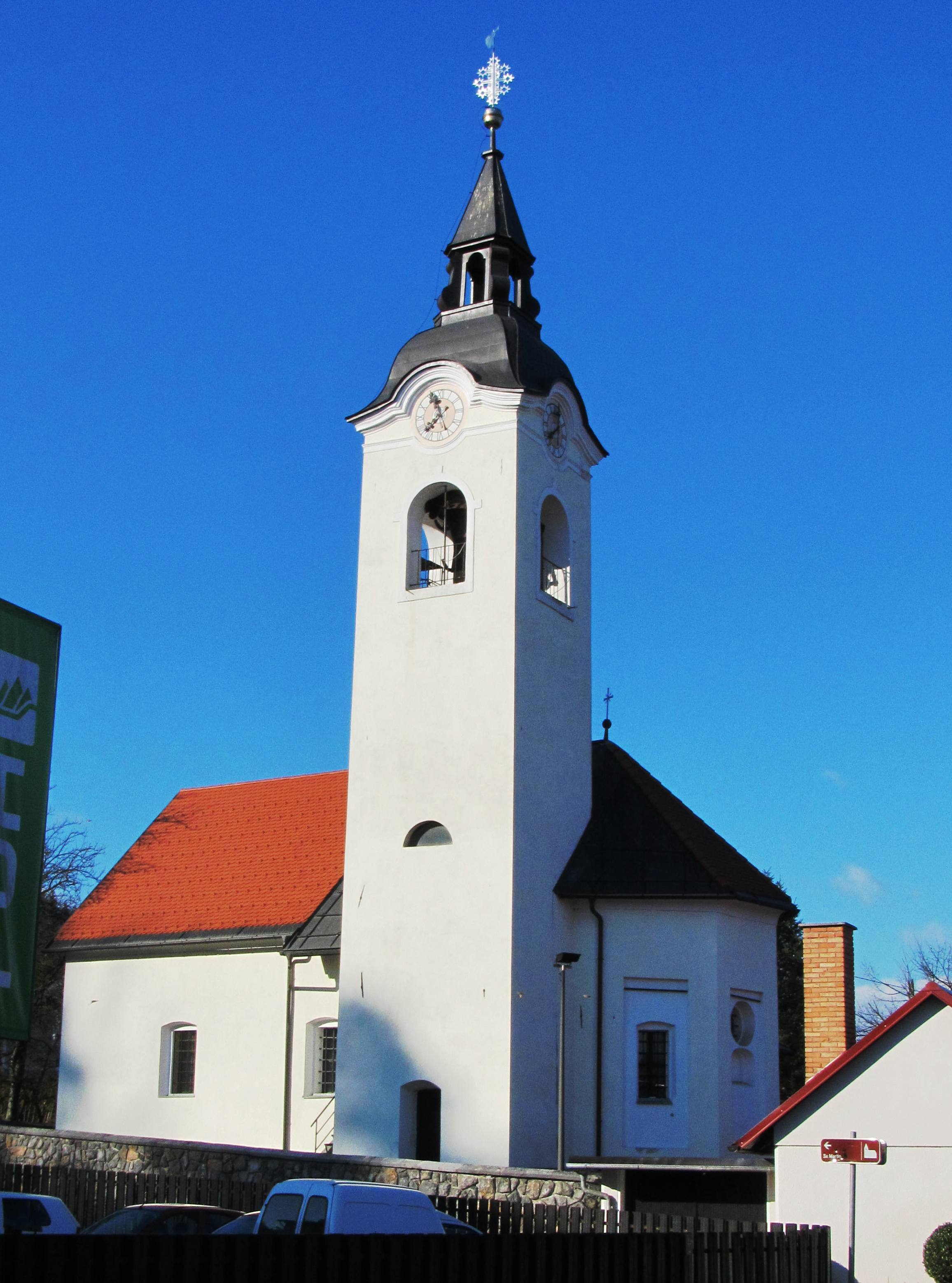
St. Martin's Church

Saint Martin's Church in the village is a chapel of ease. It was first mentioned in written sources in 1414. It was remodeled in Baroque style after a fire in 1749. It formerly belonged to the Parish of Saint Peter in Ljubljana, but was reassigned to the Parish of Dobrova in 1785. The altars are of unknown age and were reworked by the sculptor Leopold Gecelj in 1872. At the end of the 19th century the church possessed two chalices, one dating from 1573 and another of presumably equal age. The bell tower of the church was octagonal until 1856, when it was torn down and rebuilt larger for a new bell. The walled area around the church probably contained a cemetery at one time because the parish church in Ljubljana was too far away and the nearest cemetery, in Dobrova, was in another parish. The main altar was created by the stonemason Alojz Vodnik from Podutik in 1902.

== Notable people ==
Notable people that were born or lived in Podsmreka include:

- Ivan (Ivo) Erbežnik (1881–1960), painter
- John Plevnik (1873–1938), pastor of Saint Joseph's Parish, Joliet, Illinois

== Gallery ==
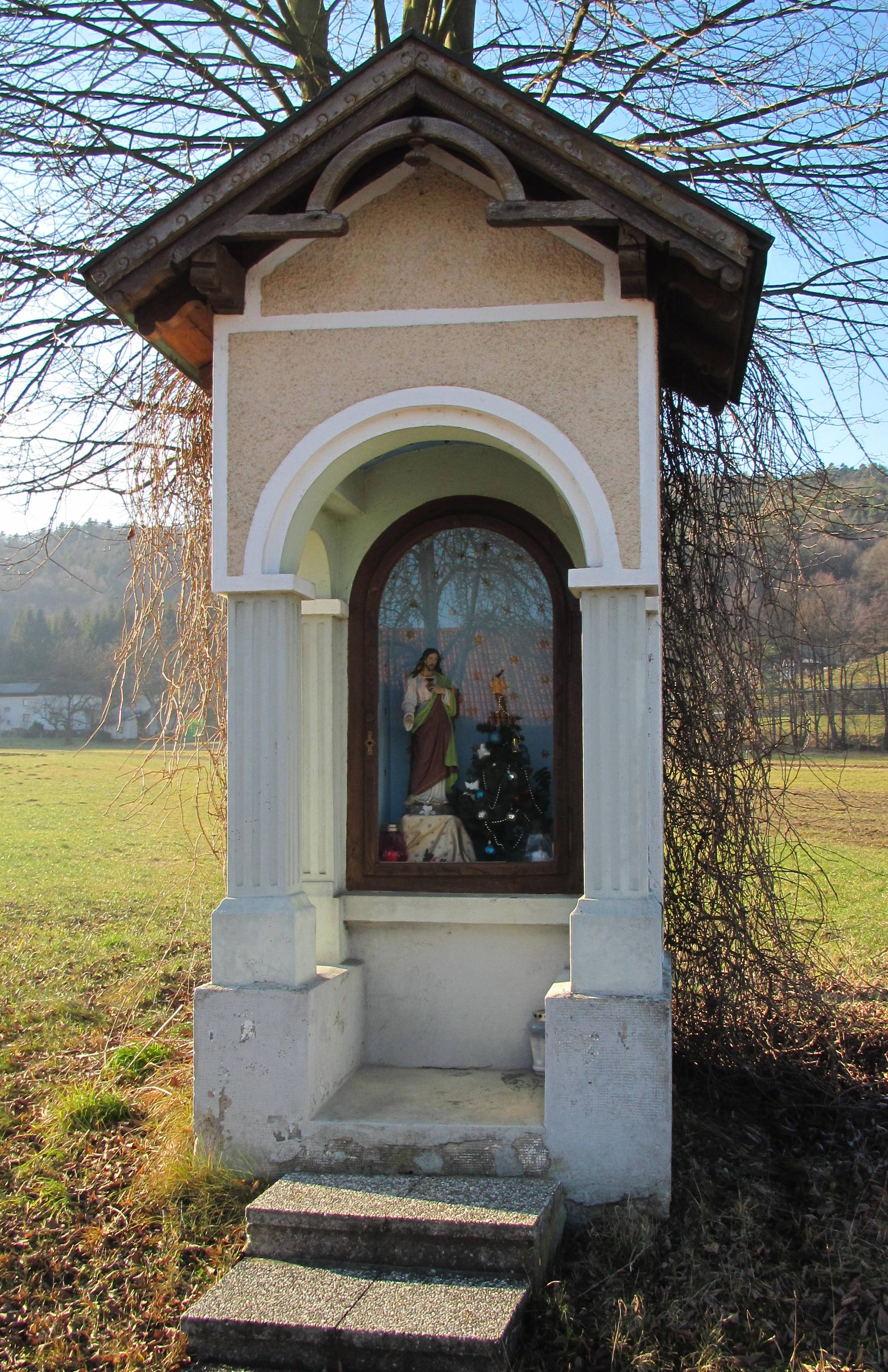
Wayside shrine in Podsmreka
