= Vrhpolje, Zenica =

Vrhpolje
- Village
- Location within Bosnia and Herzegovina
- Coordinates: 44.2337461°N 18.0453658°E
- Country: Bosnia and Herzegovina
- Entity: Federation of Bosnia and Herzegovina
- Canton: Zenica-Doboj
- Municipality: Zenica

Area
  - Total: 0.31 sq mi (0.79 km^{2})

Population (2013)
  - Total: 240
  - Density: 790/sq mi (300/km^{2})
- Time zone: UTC+1 (CET)
  - Summer (DST): UTC+2 (CEST)

Vrhpolje is a village in the City of Zenica, Bosnia and Herzegovina.

== Demographics ==
According to the 2013 census, its population was 240

Ethnicity in 2013
Ethnicity	Number	Percentage
Bosniaks	239	99.6%
other/undeclared	1	0.4%
Total	240	100%
