= Vrhpolje pri Moravčah =

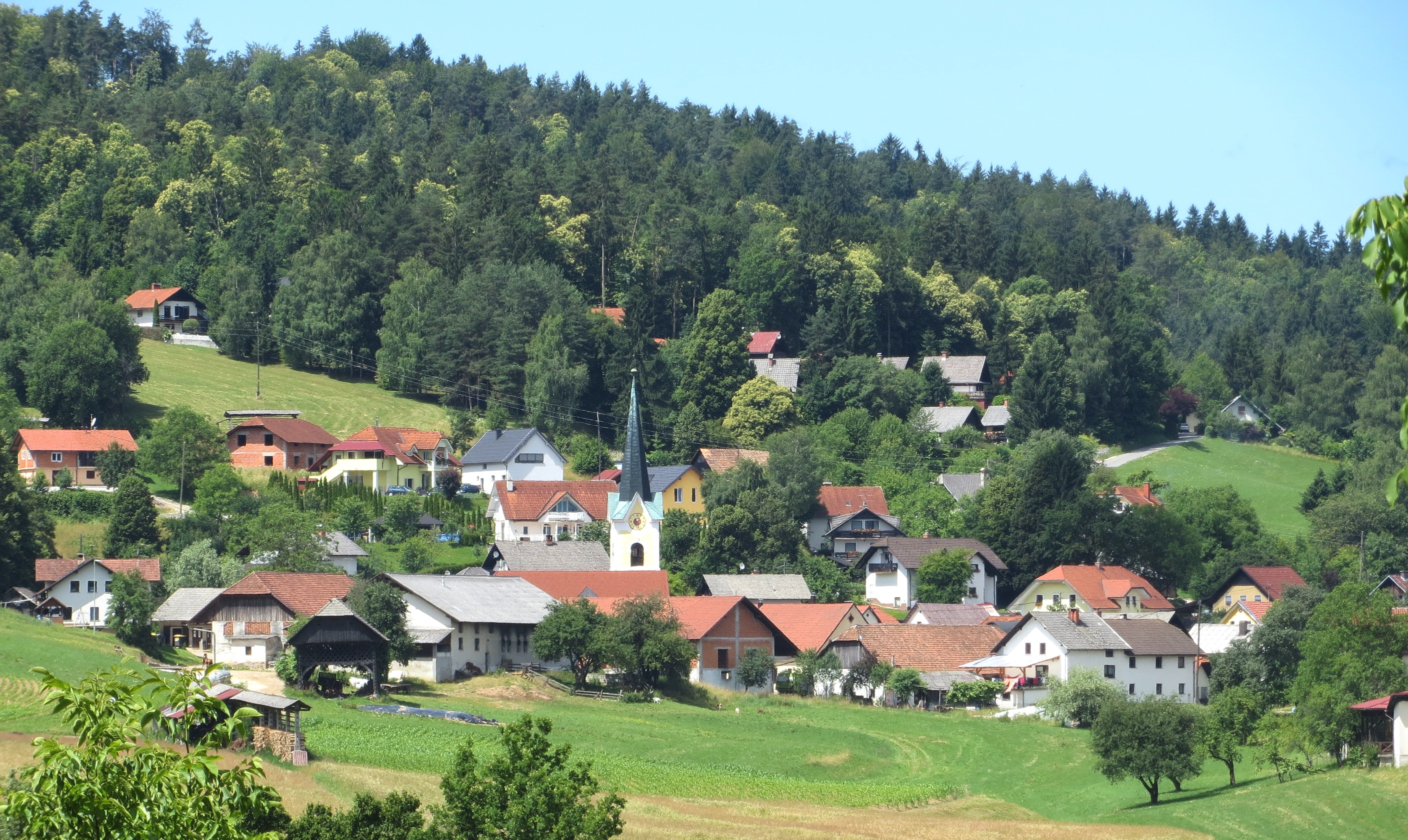

- Location in Slovenia
- Coordinates: 46°7′31.51″N 14°42′34.18″E
- Country: Slovenia
- Traditional region: Upper Carniola
- Statistical region: Central Slovenia
- Municipality: Moravče

Area
  - Total: 1.05 km^{2} (0.41 sq mi)
- Elevation: 373.7 m (1,226 ft)

Population (2002)
  - Total: 195
- Postal code: 1251

Vrhpolje pri Moravčah (pronounced [ˈʋərxpɔljɛ pri mɔˈraːu̯tʃax]; German: Oberfeld) is a village in the Municipality of Moravče in central Slovenia. The area is part of the traditional region of Upper Carniola. It is now included with the rest of the municipality in the Central Slovenia Statistical Region.

== Name ==
Vrhpolje pri Moravčah was attested in historical sources as Oberveld in 1301. The name of the settlement was changed from Vrhpolje to Vrhpolje pri Moravčah in 1953. In the past the German name was Oberfeld.

== Church ==
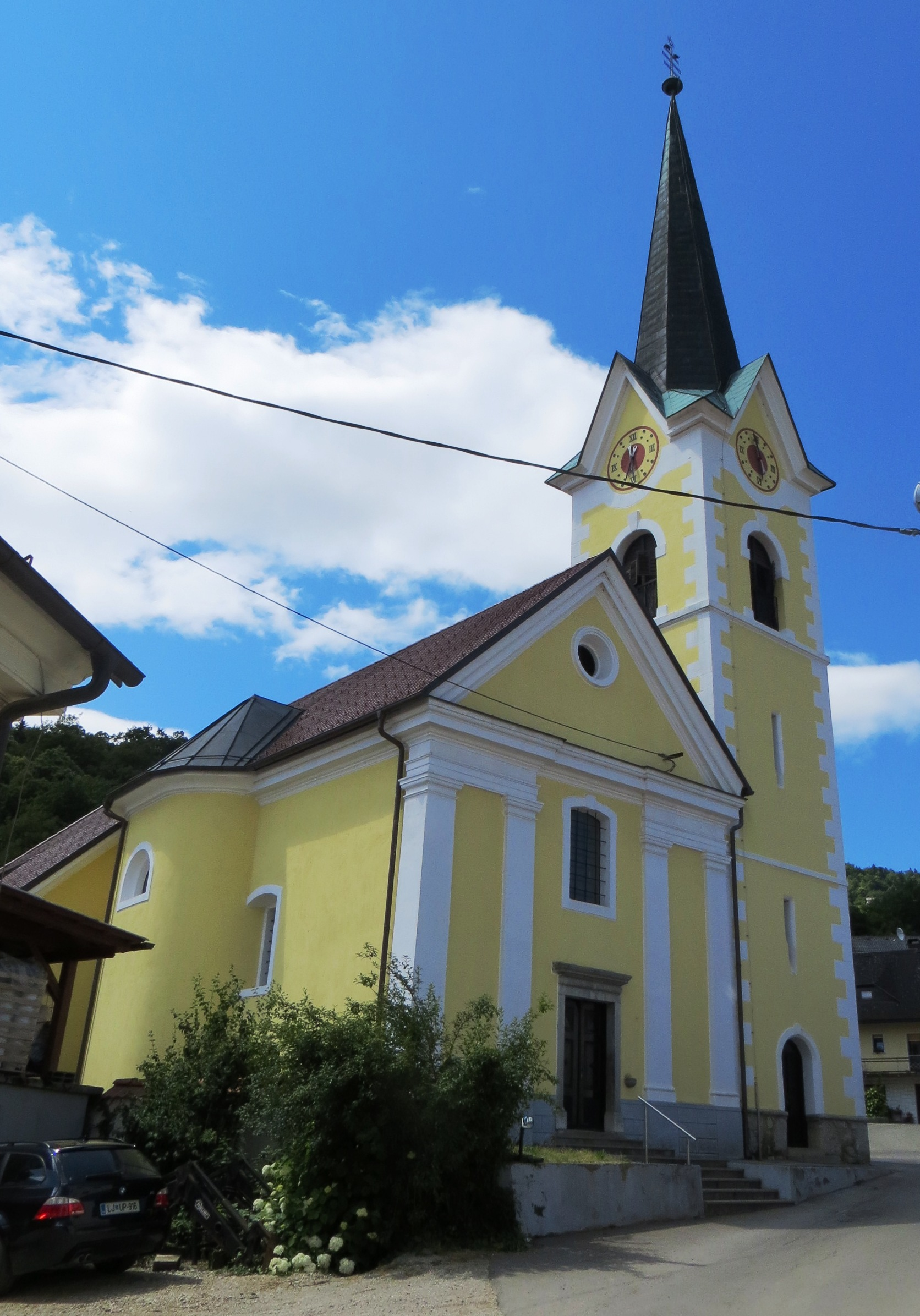
Saints Peter and Paul Church

The parish church in the settlement is dedicated to Saints Peter and Paul and belongs to the Roman Catholic Archdiocese of Ljubljana. It dates to the 16th century with 18th-century additions and modifications.
