= Hrastje pri Cerkljah =

- Location in Slovenia
- Coordinates: 45°53′42.91″N 15°29′48.82″E
- Country: Slovenia
- Traditional region: Lower Carniola
- Statistical region: Lower Sava
- Municipality: Brežice

Area
  - Total: 1.96 km^{2} (0.76 sq mi)
- Elevation: 154.6 m (507 ft)

Population (2020)
  - Total: 130
  - Density: 66/km^{2} (170/sq mi)

Hrastje pri Cerkljah (pronounced [ˈxɾaːstjɛ pɾi ˈtseːɾkljax]; German: Hrastie) is a small village northwest of Cerklje ob Krki in the Municipality of Brežice in eastern Slovenia. The area is part of the traditional region of Lower Carniola. It is now included in the Lower Sava Statistical Region.

== Name ==
The name Hrastje is derived from the Slovene common noun hrast 'oak', referring to the local vegetation. The name of the settlement was changed from Hrastje to Hrastje pri Cerkljah (literally, 'Hrastje near Cerklje') in 1953. In the past the settlement was known as Hrastie in German.

== History ==
During the Second World War, in the fall of 1941, the German authorities evicted 32 families from the village and settled Gottschee Germans in their houses.

== Notable people ==
Notable people that were born or lived in Hrastje pri Cerkljah include:

- Janez Gramc (1907–1972), Partisan soldier and combatant in the Spanish Civil War
