= Meninatherium =

Meninatherium Temporal range: Late Oligocene

Scientific classification
- Kingdom: Animalia
- Phylum: Chordata
- Class: Mammalia
- Order: Perissodactyla
- Family: Rhinocerotidae
- Genus: †Meninatherium; Abel, 1910
- Species: †M. telleri

Binomial name
- †Meninatherium telleri Abel, 1910

Meninatherium is a poorly understood extinct genus of Asian rhinocerotid. It is known only from an Upper Oligocene European type specimen which was destroyed during World War II.
