= Vrhpolje pri Šentvidu =

Vrhpolje pri Šentvidu Vrhpolje (until 1953)
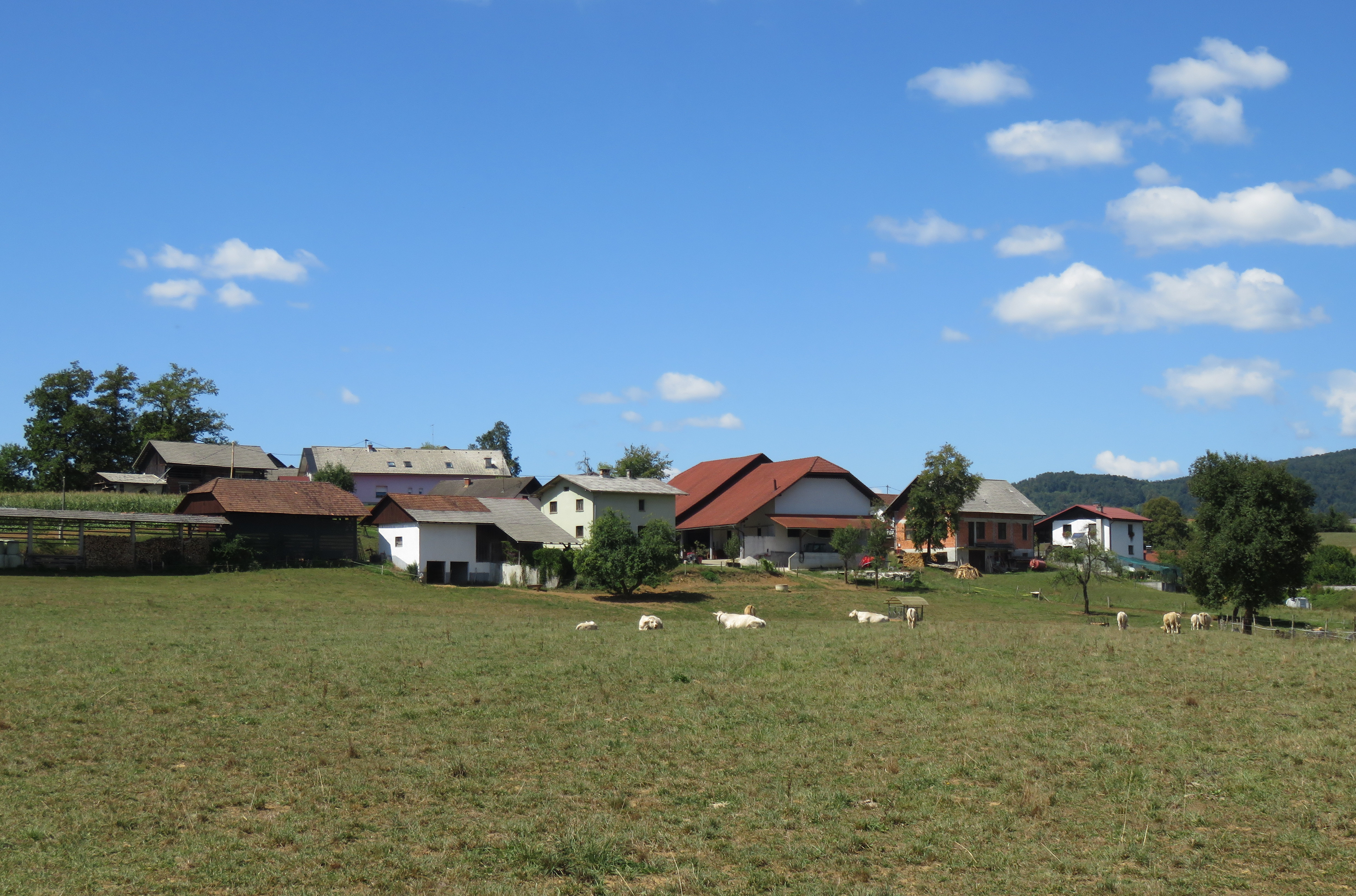

- Location in Slovenia
- Coordinates: 45°56′10.47″N 14°49′8.62″E
- Country: Slovenia
- Traditional region: Lower Carniola
- Statistical region: Central Slovenia
- Municipality: Ivančna Gorica

Area
  - Total: 1.03 km^{2} (0.40 sq mi)
- Elevation: 321.9 m (1,056 ft)

Population (2002)
  - Total: 77

Vrhpolje pri Šentvidu (pronounced [ˈʋəɾxpɔljɛ pɾi ʃɛnˈtʋiːdu]; German: Oberfeld) is a settlement east of Ivančna Gorica in the Lower Carniola region of Slovenia. The area is now included in the Central Slovenia Statistical Region.

== Name ==
The name of the settlement was changed from Vrhpolje to Vrhpolje pri Šentvidu in 1953. In the past the German name was Oberfeld.
