= Hrastje pri Grosupljem =

Hrastje pri Grosupljem Hrastje (until 1955)
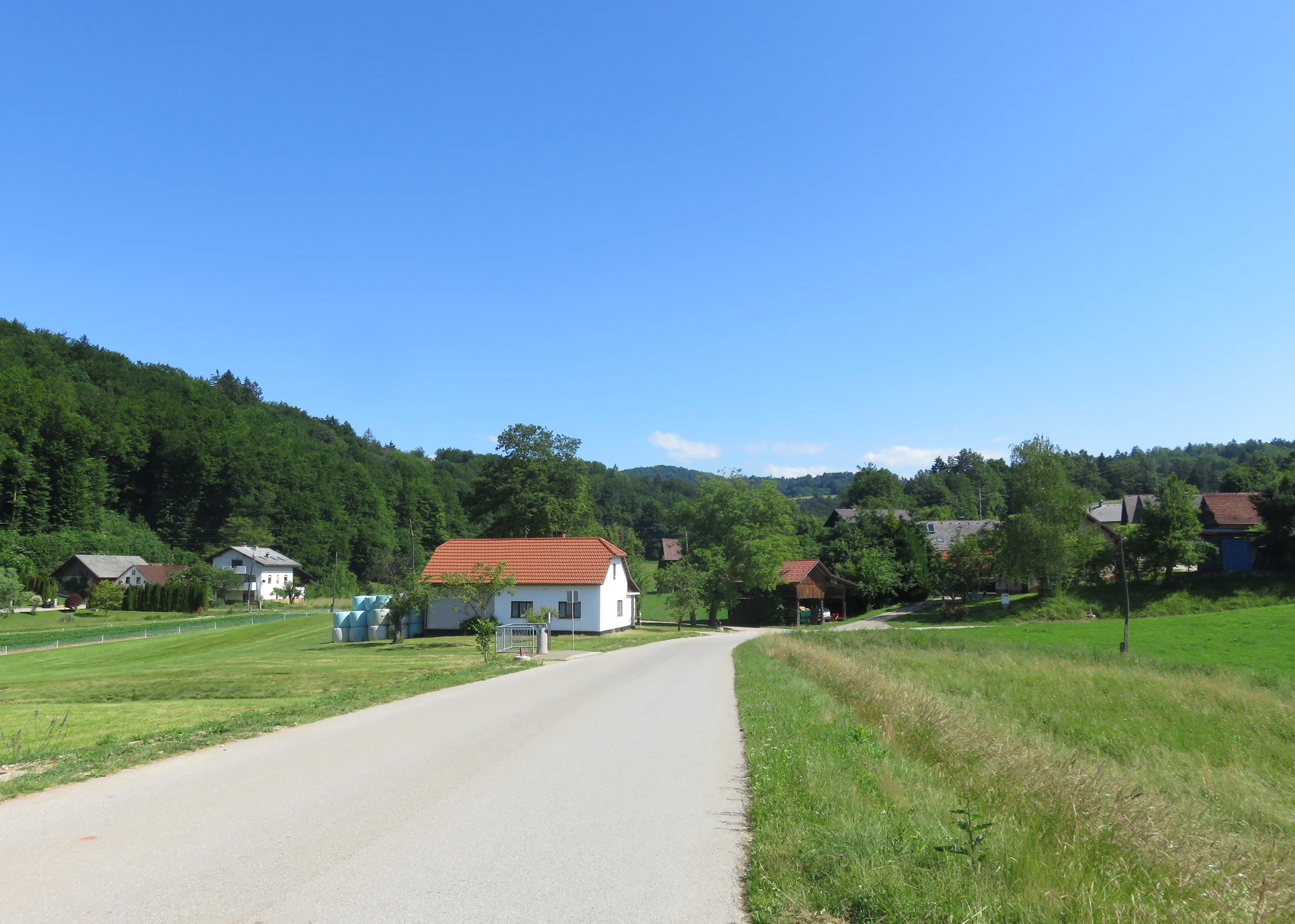

- Location in Slovenia
- Coordinates: 45°58′17.29″N 14°38′44.33″E
- Country: Slovenia
- Traditional region: Lower Carniola
- Statistical region: Central Slovenia
- Municipality: Grosuplje

Area
  - Total: 1.02 km^{2} (0.39 sq mi)
- Elevation: 359.3 m (1,179 ft)

Population (2002)
  - Total: 60

Hrastje pri Grosupljem (pronounced [ˈxɾaːstjɛ pɾi ɡɾɔˈsuːpljɛm]) is a settlement between Grosuplje and Šmarje-Sap in central Slovenia. The Slovenian A2 motorway runs across the settlement's territory. The area is part of the historical region of Lower Carniola. The Municipality of Grosuplje is now included in the Central Slovenia Statistical Region.

== Name ==
The name of the settlement was changed from Hrastje to Hrastje pri Grosupljem (literally, 'Hrastje near Grosuplje') in 1955. The name Hrastje is derived from the Slovene common noun hrast 'oak', referring to the local vegetation.
