= Šmartno ob Savi =

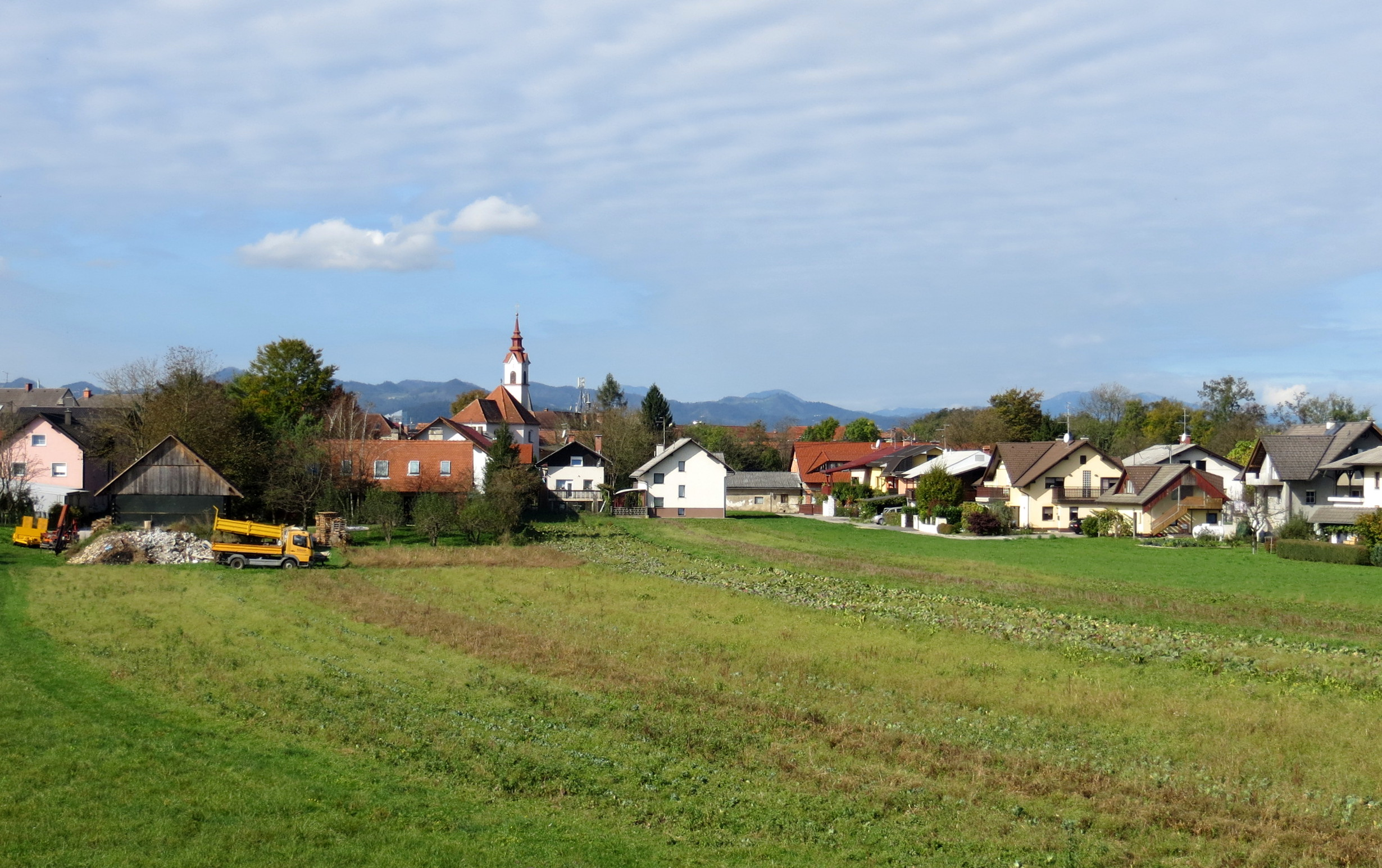

- Location in Slovenia
- Coordinates: 46°4′35.56″N 14°33′25.61″E
- Country: Slovenia
- Traditional region: Upper Carniola
- Statistical region: Central Slovenia
- Municipality: Ljubljana
- Elevation: 290 m (950 ft)

Šmartno ob Savi (pronounced [ˈʃmaːɾtnɔ ɔp ˈsaːʋi]; in older sources also Šmartno pri Savi or Šmartin ob Savi; German: Sankt Martin an der Save) is a formerly independent settlement in the northeast part of the capital Ljubljana in central Slovenia. It is part of the traditional region of Upper Carniola and is now included with the rest of the municipality in the Central Slovenia Statistical Region.

== Geography ==
Šmartno ob Savi lies along the road from Hrastje to Stožice. It is a roadside village on a terrace above the Sava River. Most of the houses stand on the edge of the terrace, but some also stand on a lower terrace further north, towards the river. It includes the hamlet of Murglje to the east, bordering on Hrastje. The soil is gravelly. A quiet arm of the nearby Sava River was used for swimming.

== Names ==
Šmartno ob Savi literally means 'Šmartno on the Sava'. It is named after Saint Martin, the patron saint of the local church. The name Šmartno is a result of contraction (*šent Martìn 'Saint Martin' > *Šm̥martìn > *Šmártən) and the masculine form then underwent hypercorrection to a neuter noun. The hamlet of Murglje in the settlement is named after an avenue of mulberry trees that had been planted by the former convent of the Sisters of Mary (murve 'mulberries' > *murle > *murgle > Murglje). The trees were cut down before the Second World War.

== History ==
Roman graves have been found in the fields in Šmartno ob Savi, testifying to its early settlement. During the Second World War, several Partisan bunkers were located in the village. One bunker was used to store propaganda material, another for a radio station, and an underground mimeograph print shop operated under Antonija Kasper's house. Šmartno ob Savi was annexed by the City of Ljubljana in 1982, ending its existence as an independent settlement.

== Church ==
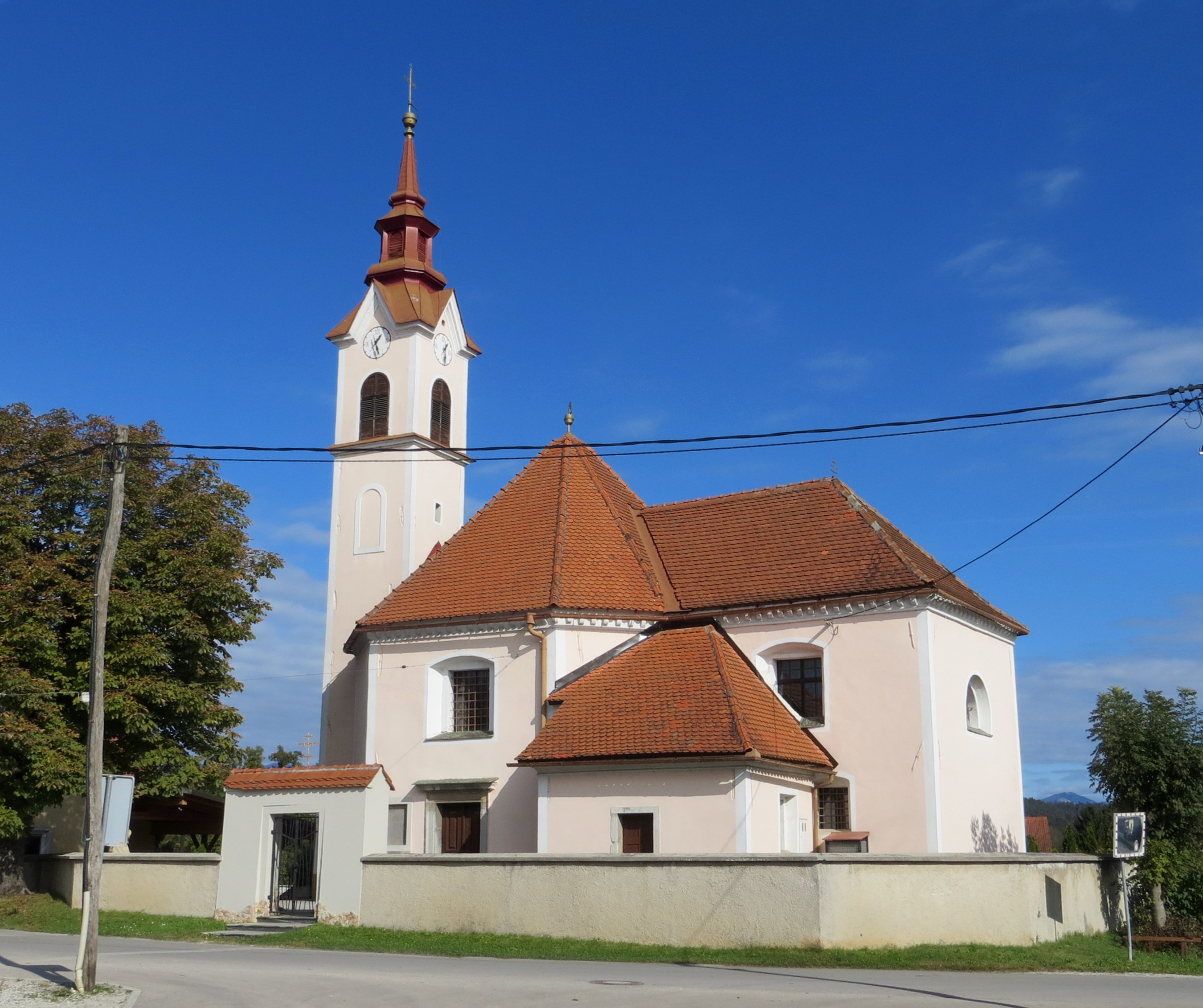
Saint Martin's Church

The church in Šmartno ob Savi is dedicated to Saint Martin. It has a Baroque octagonal nave with a chancel and was mentioned in written sources in 1430. The main altar bears the year 1699. The pulpit dates from the second half of the 17th century and the side altars, from the beginning of the 19th century, show Rococo influences. The church was associated with a convent with a large garden; the convent was confiscated in 1945 and converted into housing.
