= Šmartno v Tuhinju =

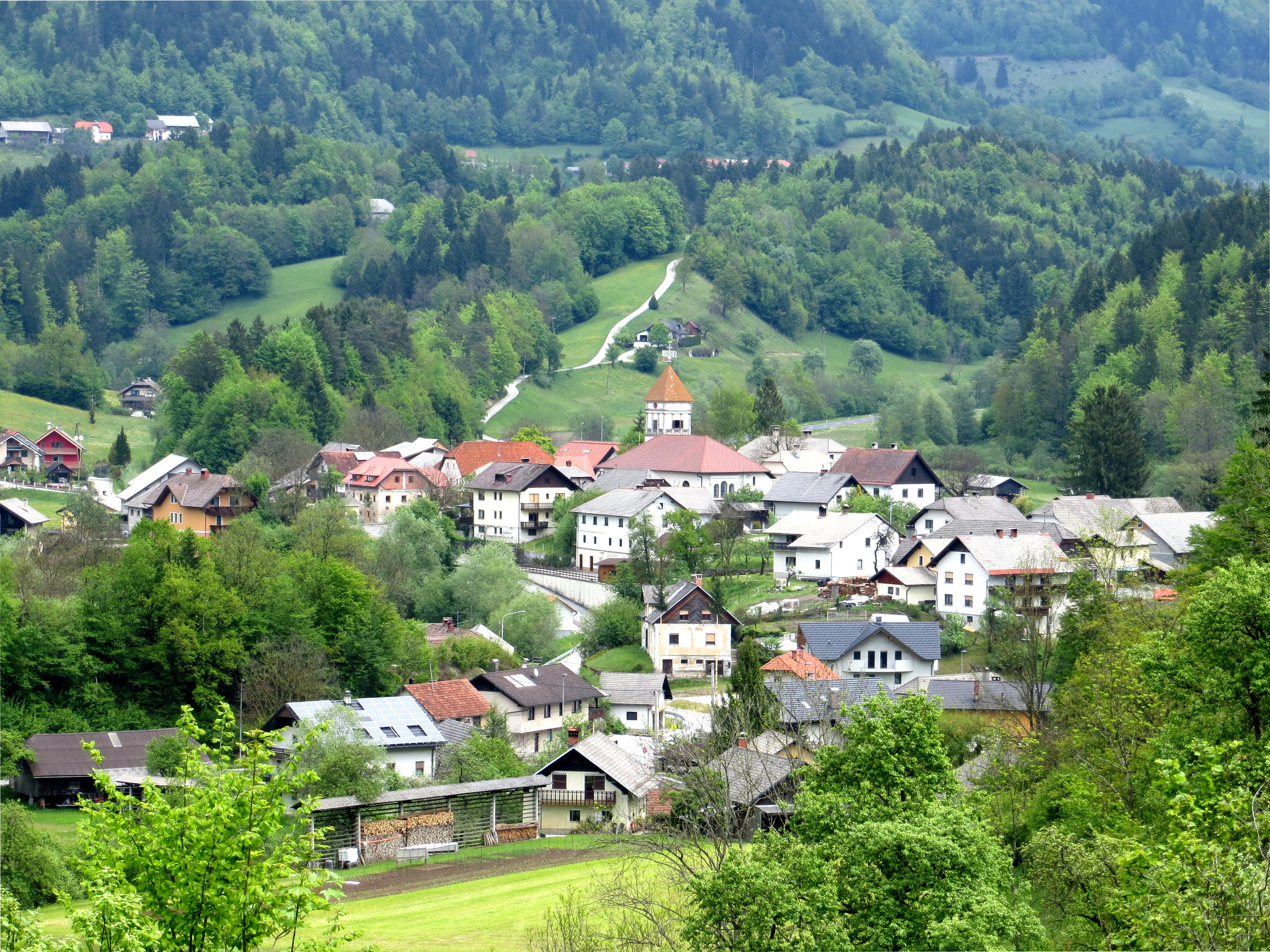

- Location in Slovenia
- Coordinates: 46°12′53.34″N 14°43′50.89″E
- Country: Slovenia
- Traditional region: Upper Carniola
- Statistical region: Central Slovenia
- Municipality: Kamnik

Area
  - Total: 1.75 km^{2} (0.68 sq mi)
- Elevation: 462.5 m (1,517 ft)

Population (2002)
  - Total: 202

Šmartno v Tuhinju (pronounced [ˈʃmaːɾtnɔ ʍ tuˈxiːnju]; German: Sankt Martin) is a village in the Tuhinj Valley in the Municipality of Kamnik in the Upper Carniola region of Slovenia.

== Church ==
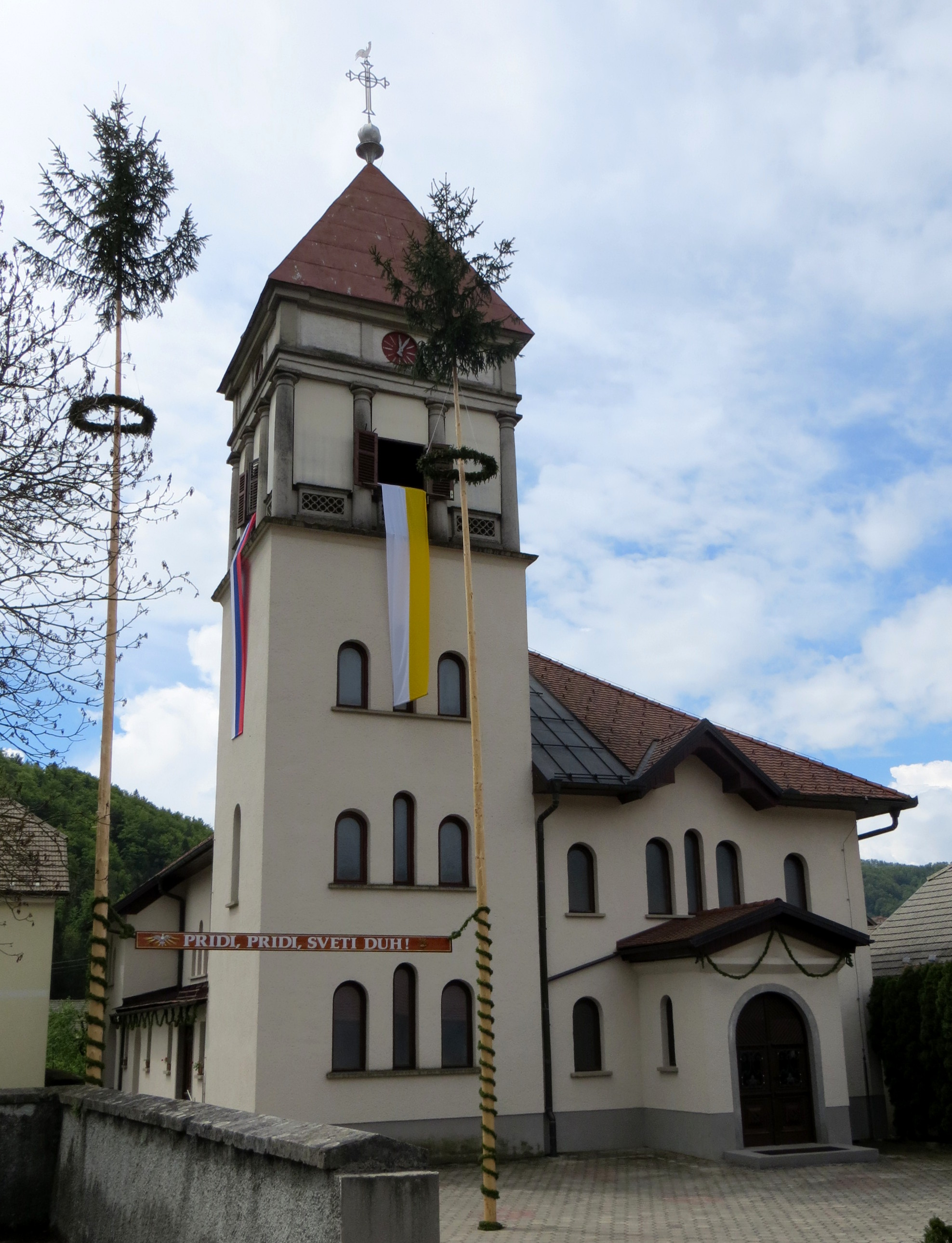
Saint Martin's Church

The parish church in the village is dedicated to Saint Martin.
