= Tuhinj Valley =

Valley in Slovenia

Coordinates: 46°13′17.09″N 14°46′33.33″E

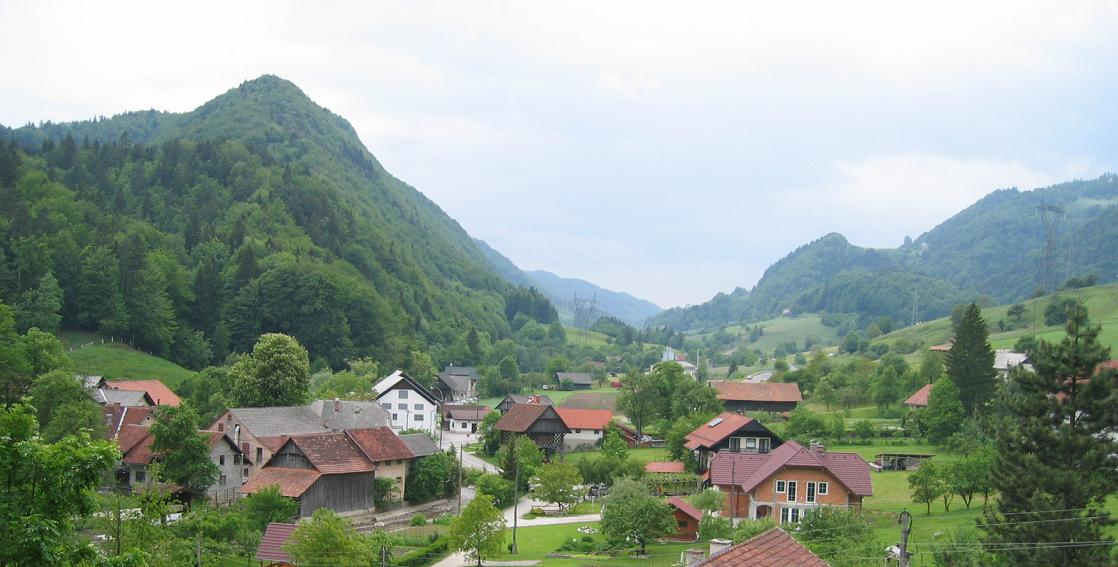
Motnik, a village in the Tuhinj Valley

The Tuhinj Valley (pronounced [tuˈxiːn]; Slovene: Tuhinjska dolina) is a valley in Slovenia linking the Celje Basin with the Ljubljana Basin in an east-west direction along the courses of the Nevljica and Motnišnica rivers.

== Geography ==
The western part of the valley was formed by the watershed of the Nevljica, flowing into the Kamnik Bistrica, and the narrower, eastern part by the Motnišnica, a tributary of the Savinja River. Their drainage divide is at the Kozjak Pass at an elevation of 655 m between Cirkuše v Tuhinju and Špitalič. The largest settlements in the valley include Laze v Tuhinju, Šmartno v Tuhinju, and Motnik. The large number of old settlements points to the fact that the valley was an important thoroughfare in the Middle Ages and later as a passage between Lower Styria and Upper Carniola.

== Name ==
The Tuhinj region was mentioned in written sources circa 1400 as Tuchein, Tuchen, and Tucheiner alben. The name was originally *Tuxyn′ь, derived from the hypocorism *Tuxynъ (based on the Slavic personal name *Tuxъ or *Tuxa). This root is also the source of similar names such as Tuhinje in Herzegovina, Tuin in Macedonia, Tukhin in Russia, and Tuchyňa in Slovakia.

== Industry ==
Until the mid-20th century brown coal was mined in the valley near Motnik. Tourism has only recently started to develop with the building of the Snovik Spa.
