= Ruard Manor =

Manor house in Jesenice, Slovenia

Coordinates: 46°25′58.9″N 14°3′26.52″E

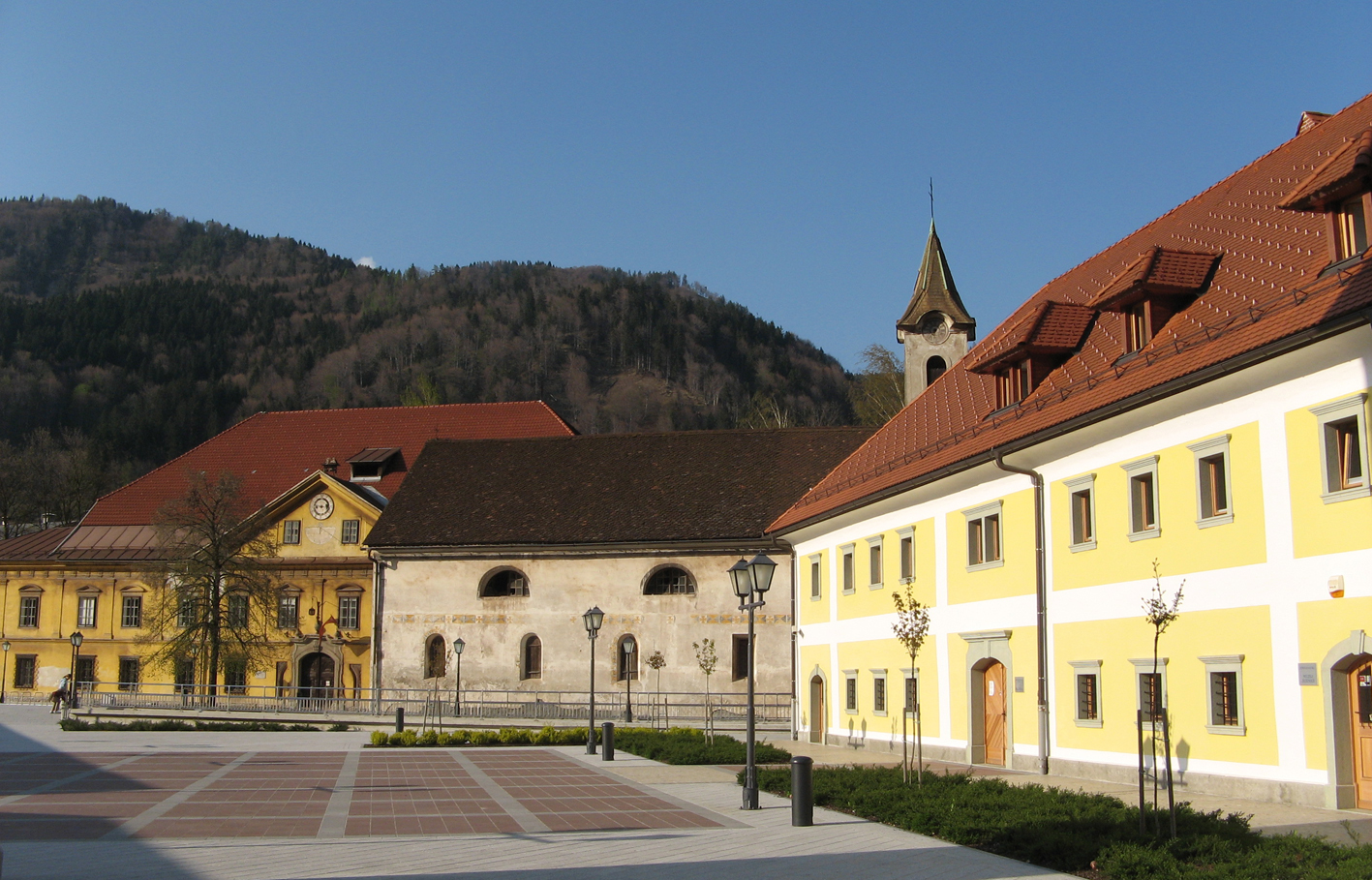
Stara Sava, the central square. From the left to the right: Ruard Manor, Church of the Assumption of Mary, Worker's Barracks

The Bucellini–Ruard Manor, commonly referred to as the Ruard Manor (Slovene: Ruardova graščina), is a 16th-century manor house located in the Sava neighbourhood of the town of Jesenice in northwestern Slovenia, at the street address of 45 France Prešeren Street (Cesta Franceta Prešerna 45). It is one of four so-called "ironworks castles" built in the area during the 16th and early 17th centuries by the owners of iron-mining and -processing facilities, in what were then the clustered settlements of Plavž, Sava, Murova and Javornik, amalgamated into the town of Jesenice in 1929. The Kos Manor in Murova also survives; the Plavž and Javornik manors were demolished.

The Ruard Manor was built in 1538 by the Italian businessman Bernardo Bucellini, who had recently relocated to Sava from Bergamo and whose family would come to dominate the iron mining and processing industry of the entire upper Sava valley. Unlike the Kos manor, Bucelenni chose to locate this residence close to the ironworks themselves. The Bucellinis were very successful for a time, and were ennobled during the 17th century, taking the name "von Reichenberg" after the German name of their ore mines at Savske Jame. In 1686 the family was elevated to counthoood.

The manor gained the second half of its current name in 1766, when Valentin Ruard, a Belgian entrepreneur, bought the entire estate and restored the failing ironworks surrounding it. Leopold Ruard, his son, was mayor of Jesenice under the brief period of French rule. In 1831, the manor was expanded and reconstructed in the Neoclassical style. In the next generation, it passed out of Ruard hands, as Viktor Ruard was unable to obtain capital for the modernization of the family ironworks, and was forced to sell both them and the manor to the KID company in 1871, which converted it into clerks' housing (much like the nearby Workers' Barracks).

Since 1954, the manor has served as a museum, and later became the seat of the Upper Sava Museum. It hosts several permanent exhibits:

- Historical museum of the iron and steel industry in the Jesenice region, featuring tools, artifacts and motorized maquettes of industrial facilities
- Paleontological collection of the Palaeozoic flora and fauna of the western Karawanks
- Mineral collection
