= Weissenfels Castle =

Coordinates: 46°30′6.79″N 13°38′41.65″E

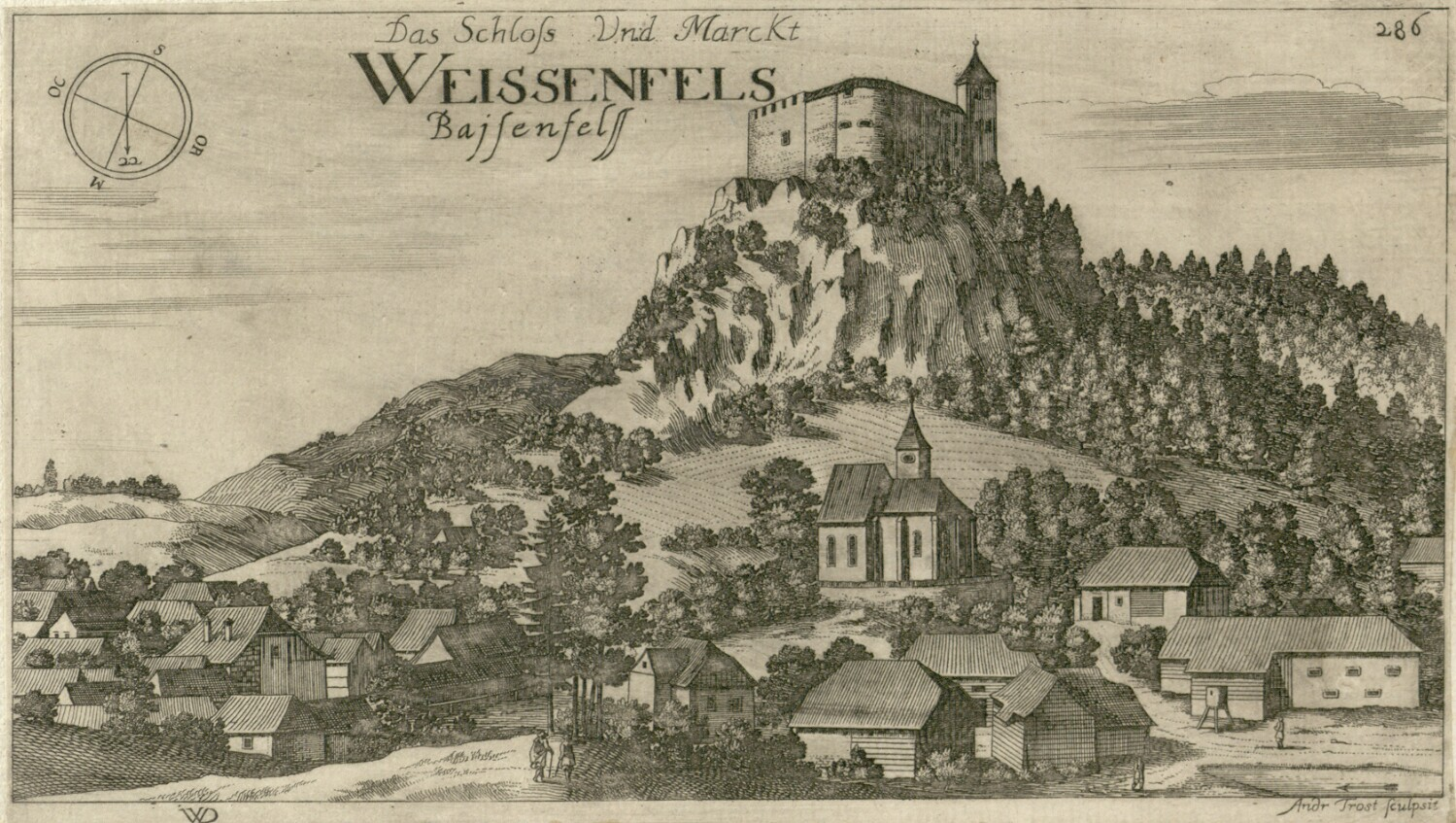
Weissenfels Castle in a 1679 engraving by Valvasor

Weissenfels Castle (German: Schloss Weissenfels, Italian: Castello Fusine, Slovene: Grad Bela Peč) is a castle ruin above the settlement of Fusine in Valromana in the extreme northeast corner of Italy. The ruins are located 5.7 kilometers (3.5 mi) from the tripoint between Slovenia, Austria, and Italy.

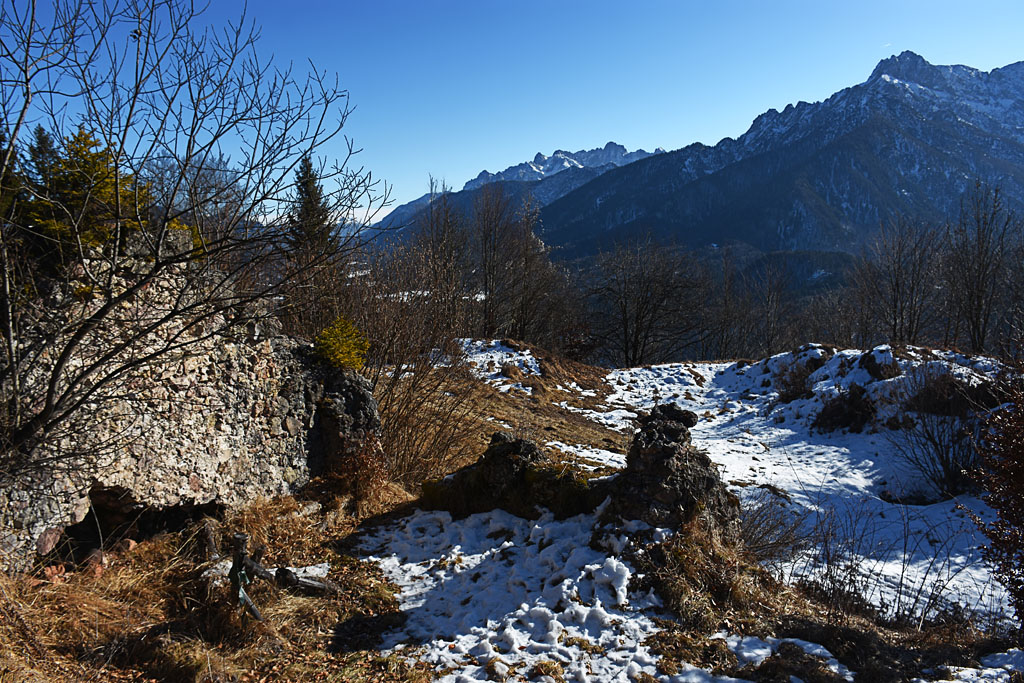
Weissenfels castle

== History ==
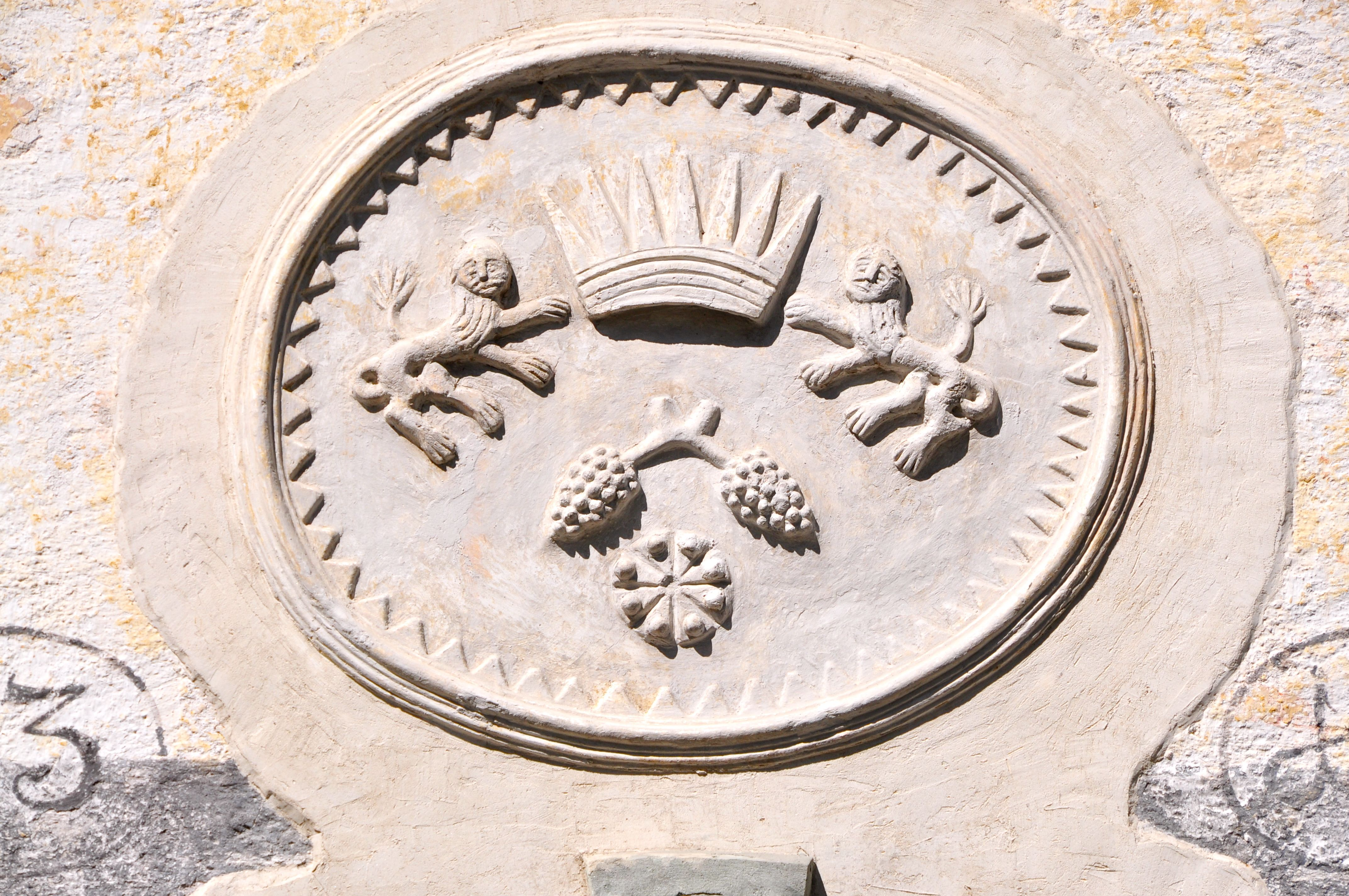
The coat-of-arms of the lords of Weissenfels Castle at a house in Podkoren

The castle was ordered built after 1431 by Frederik II of Celje, as a well-fortified stronghold atop a 1,120-meter (3,670 ft) hill of the same name. The Counts of Celje had controlled the area—a nexus of important trade routes between Friuli, Carinthia, and the Upper Sava Valley—since 1418, having inherited it from the Counts of Ortenburg.

In addition to its primary function of defending the house's area landholdings, the castle served to protect the iron-ore mines and smelting furnaces of the upper Sava Valley, a sovereign possession of the Counts and a jealously guarded one because the industry was at the time normally a royal prerogative.

After the extinction of the house of Celje in 1456, the castle and associated lordship were inherited by the Habsburgs, who managed the estate via a succession of ministeriales. During the 16th century, its owners were the Bucelleni family of Jesenice, also active in the iron industry. The castle's last owners were the Kos family, landlords of numerous area settlements, including Bela Peč, Rateče, Podkoren, Kranjska Gora, Gozd–Martuljek, Dovje, Hrušica, Planina pod Golico, Jesenice, Javornik, Koroška Bela, Potoki and parts of Žirovnica, Zabreznica, and Doslovče.

The castle was abandoned in the 18th century and left to decay. The impressive ruins are nonetheless indicative of its former might.

== See also ==
- Kos Manor

== Sources ==
- Jakič, Ivan: "All Slovene Castles" (Vsi slovenski gradovi), DZS, 1999, ISBN 86-341-2325-1
