= Kos Manor =

Coordinates: 46°26′20.04″N 14°2′52.4″E

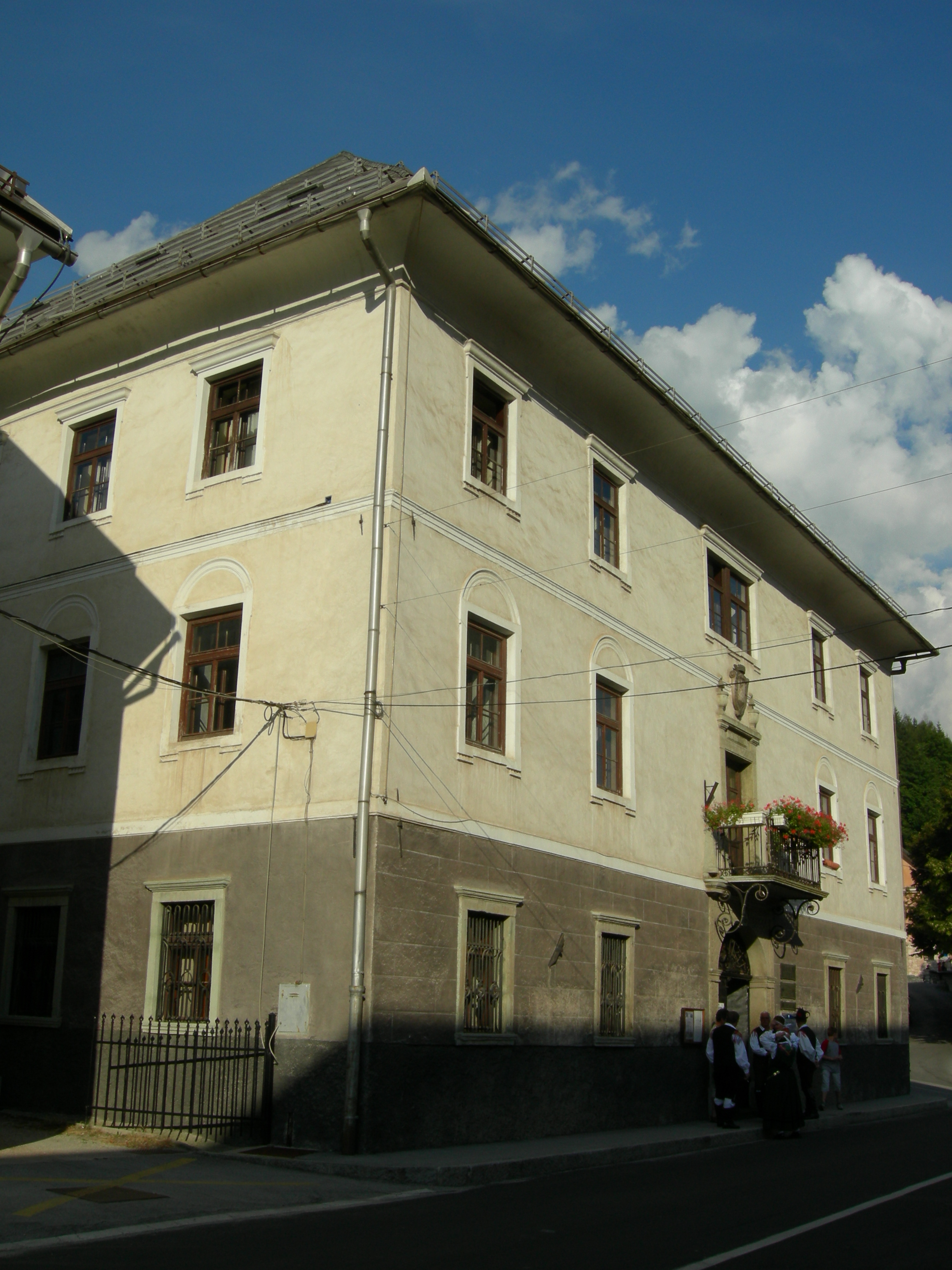
Kos Manor

The Kos Manor (Slovene: Kosova graščina) is a 16th-century manor house in the Murova neighborhood of Jesenice, Slovenia, at the street address of Cesta maršala Tita 64. It is one of four so-called "ironworks castles" built in the area during the 16th and early 17th centuries by owners of local iron-mining and -processing facilities, in what were then the clustered settlements of Plavž, Sava, Murova and Javornik, amalgamated into the town of Jesenice in 1929. The Bucellini-Ruard Manor in Sava is another survivor of the original four; the Plavž and Javornik manors have been torn down.

The Kos manor was built in 1521 by Sigismund (Žiga) of Dietrichstein, a leaseholder of the Bucelleni family, owners of the Sava ironworks. It is located in what was then the heart of the Murova settlement, at the foot of the path leading to the Church of St. Leonard atop a small hill a few hundred metres away.

In period documents, the manor is mentioned as the "old belopeš castle," in reference to the ancestral home of its builders, the Bucelleni family, the village of Bela Peč ("White Furnace," Italian: Fusine), between Rateče and Tarvisio in present-day Italy. It was also described in Valvasor's 1689 survey, The Glory of the Duchy of Carniola.

The manor obtained its current name in 1821, when its then-owner, the local merchant Frančišek Pavel Kos, enlarged and renovated it in neoclassical style. At some point thereafter, it was acquired by the Ruard family, from whom it passed into the hands of the KID company in 1872, by then the sole operator of the local ironworks. Ten years later, it was purchased by the Jesenice municipal government, initially for use as a public school, in which capacity it served from 1883 to 1915. In the interwar period, the manor, by then commonly known as the "old school" (stara šola), was converted first into apartments and city offices and later into a courthouse and prison; it saw use as the latter during World War II as well, when the occupying Wehrmacht used the building as a transfer prison.

Currently, the manor is administered by the Upper Sava Museum Jesenice and serves various cultural and public functions:

- Ground floor: art gallery (with rotating exhibits), permanent exhibit "Occupation Terror of the Years 1941-1945"
- First floor: permanent exhibit (since 1984) "The Workers' Movement and the National Liberation Struggle," on the 19th and 20th century workers' movement and its connection to local partisan resistance against the German occupation
- Second floor: multipurpose hall for municipal functions and cultural events, wedding hall

== See also ==
- Weissenfels Castle
