= Assumption of the Virgin Mary and Roch's Church (Jesenice) =

Coordinates: 46°25′57.89″N 14°3′26.94″E

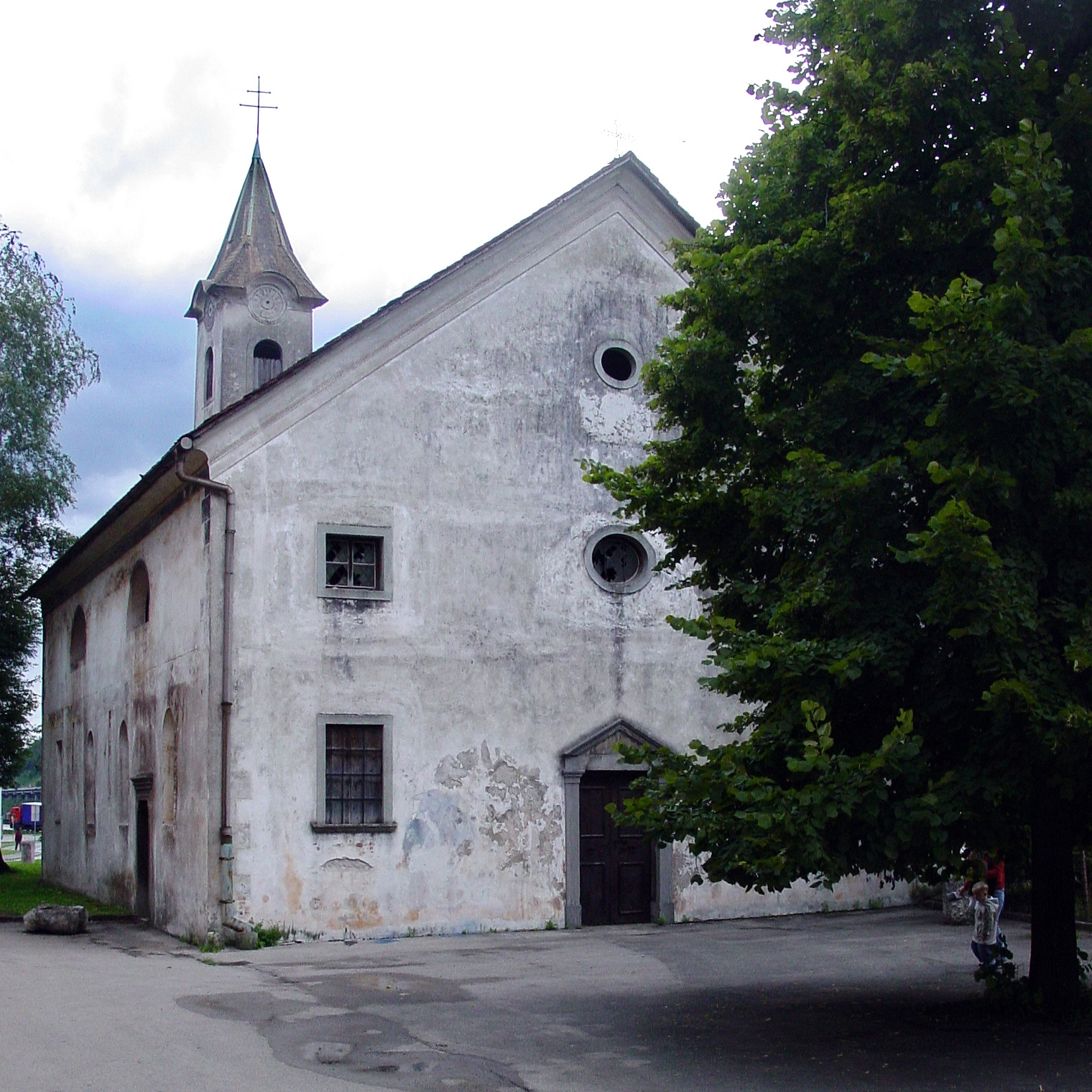

Assumption of the Virgin Mary and Roch's Church (Slovene: Cerkev Marijinega vnebovzetja in Roka) is a Catholic church in the Sava neighborhood of the town of Jesenice, in the Upper Carniola region of Slovenia.

Originally dedicated only to the Assumption of the Virgin, the church was built by the ironworks owners Julius and Orfeus Bucelleni. It is the first example of Jesuit architecture in Slovenia. The nave, with a plaque dated 1606, still preserves its original features. The choir was expanded and raised in the late 17th century. Three altar pieces painted by the Venetian artist Nicola Grassi from the church (The Assumption of the Virgin, Mary of the Rosary with Saint Dominic and Saint Francis, Saint Anthony of the Desert with an unknown early Christian martyr) were all restored in 1961 and again in 1992. There are several other oil paintings in the church.
