= Stara Sava =

Stara Sava Stara Sava
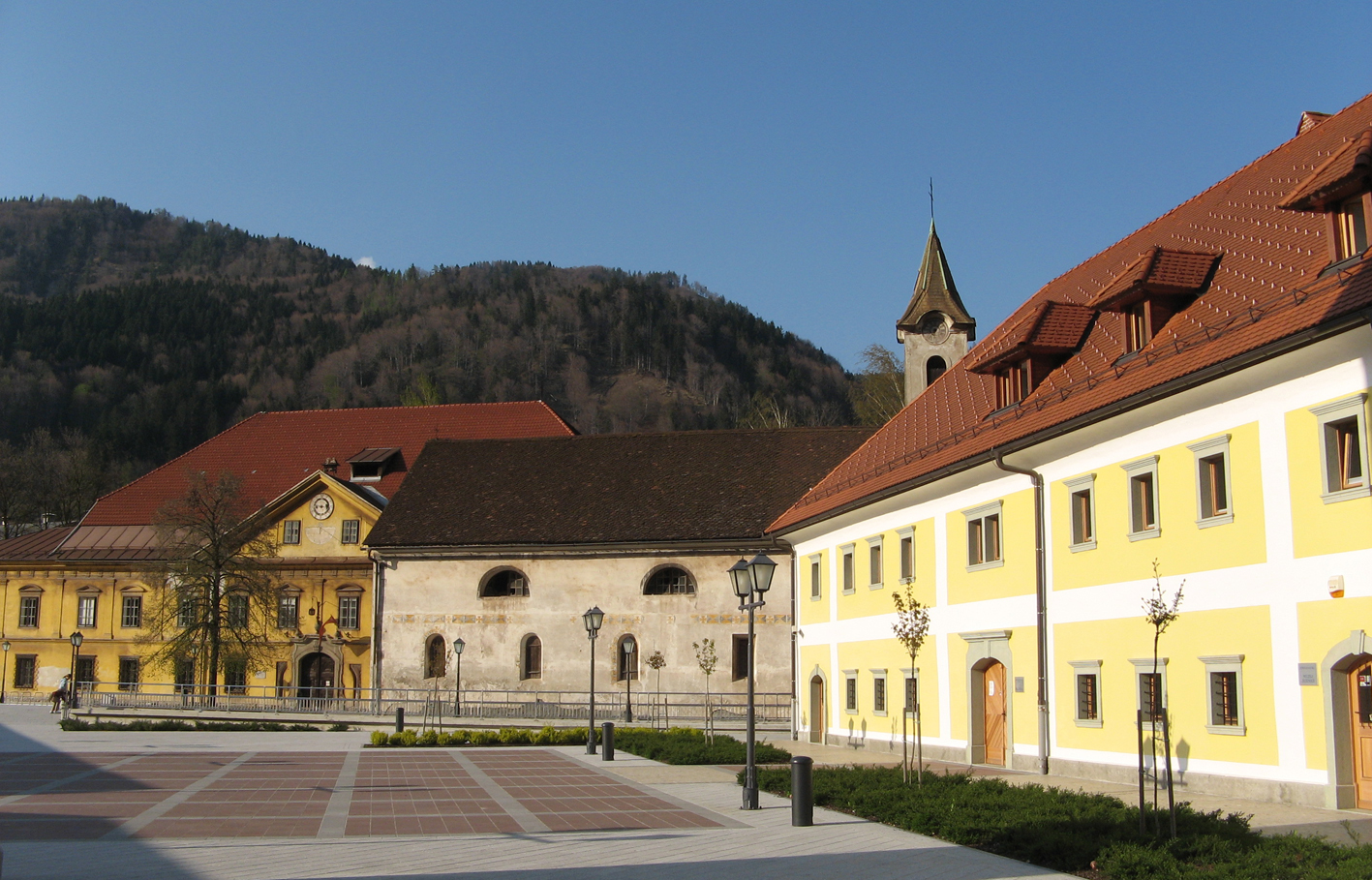
- Stara Sava, the main square. From the left to the right, the Ruard Manor, Assumption of Mary Church, the Worker Barracks

- Location in Slovenia
- Coordinates: 46°25′57″N 14°03′26″E
- Country: Slovenia
- Traditional region: Upper Carniola
- Statistical region: Upper Carniola
- Municipality: Jesenice

Stara Sava (pronounced [ˈsaːʋa]; 'old Sava'), also known as Sava, is a formerly autonomous settlement that is now part of the town of Jesenice, in the Upper Carniola region of Slovenia.

== History ==
The settlement was one of several that developed on the banks of the Sava Dolinka River after 1538, when the ironworks from the Planina pod Golico area were moved here, closer to a stronger water source.

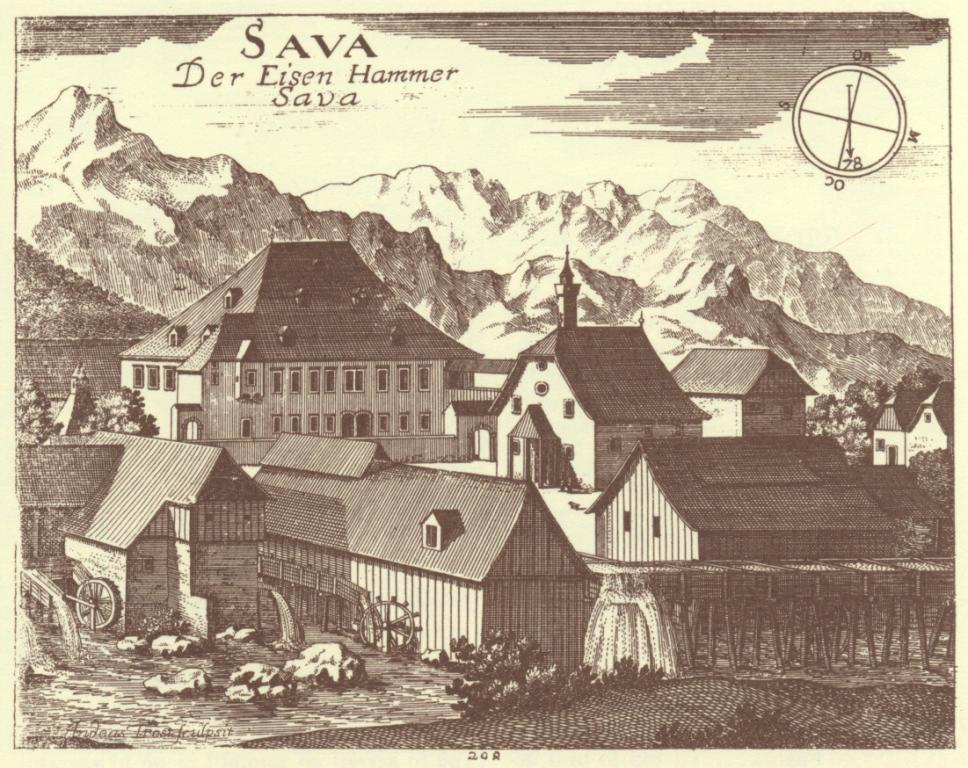
Sava by Valvasor in 1689

Sava was mentioned as the site of an ironworks by the historian Johann Weikhard von Valvasor in his Glory of the Duchy of Carniola in 1689.

The core of the hamlet consisted of a number of buildings connected to the ironworks, the following of which have survived:

- The Ruard Manor
- The Church of the Assumption of the Virgin Mary and Roch
- The Workers' Barracks, a worker's residential building
- Remnants of a historic ironworks, including an intact blast furnace, its chimney, a mill, and part of the concrete mill trench.

The blast furnace ceased operation in 1897, and the entire area was more or less abandoned as it became trapped amongst the larger facilities of the modern Jesenice Ironworks and cut off from the rest of the town of Jesenice, into which Sava and the neighboring settlements of Plavž, Murova, and Javornik had been amalgamated by royal decree in 1929. The demolition of many obsolescent facilities of the factory during a phase of urban renewal in the 1990s exposed Sava again, and a new city plan for central Jesenice was drawn up, incorporating the historic district back into the town. The entire settlement has been declared a technical monument.
