= Španov vrh =

Coordinates: 46°27′34.74″N 14°4′10.57″E

Španov vrh is a peak in the Western Karawanks above the village of Planina pod Golico, Slovenia, at an elevation of 1,361 metres (4,465 ft). Like Golica, it is a popular destination for tourists during the flowering of wild white daffodils, swathes of which cover its pastures in late April and early May. It is visited throughout the year as an easy peak to reach with panoramic views of the Julian Alps and Golica and the surrounding peaks in the Karawanks.

The Španov vrh ski slope is popular in the winter with the starting point of the single-seat chairlift at 981 metres (3,219 ft) in Planina pod Golico, a mid station at Črni vrh at 1,184 metres (3,885 ft) and an end station right at the peak of Španov vrh. The ski route winds down the slopes of Španov vrh. The ski area is suitable for both recreational and more demanding skiers. Since 1967, a carnival ski event called Svinjska glava is organized every year before Lent. The chairlift only runs during the winter period when there is enough snow for skiing. There is a convenient parking area and some overnight accommodation available in Planina pod Golico.
