= Jesenice =

- Town
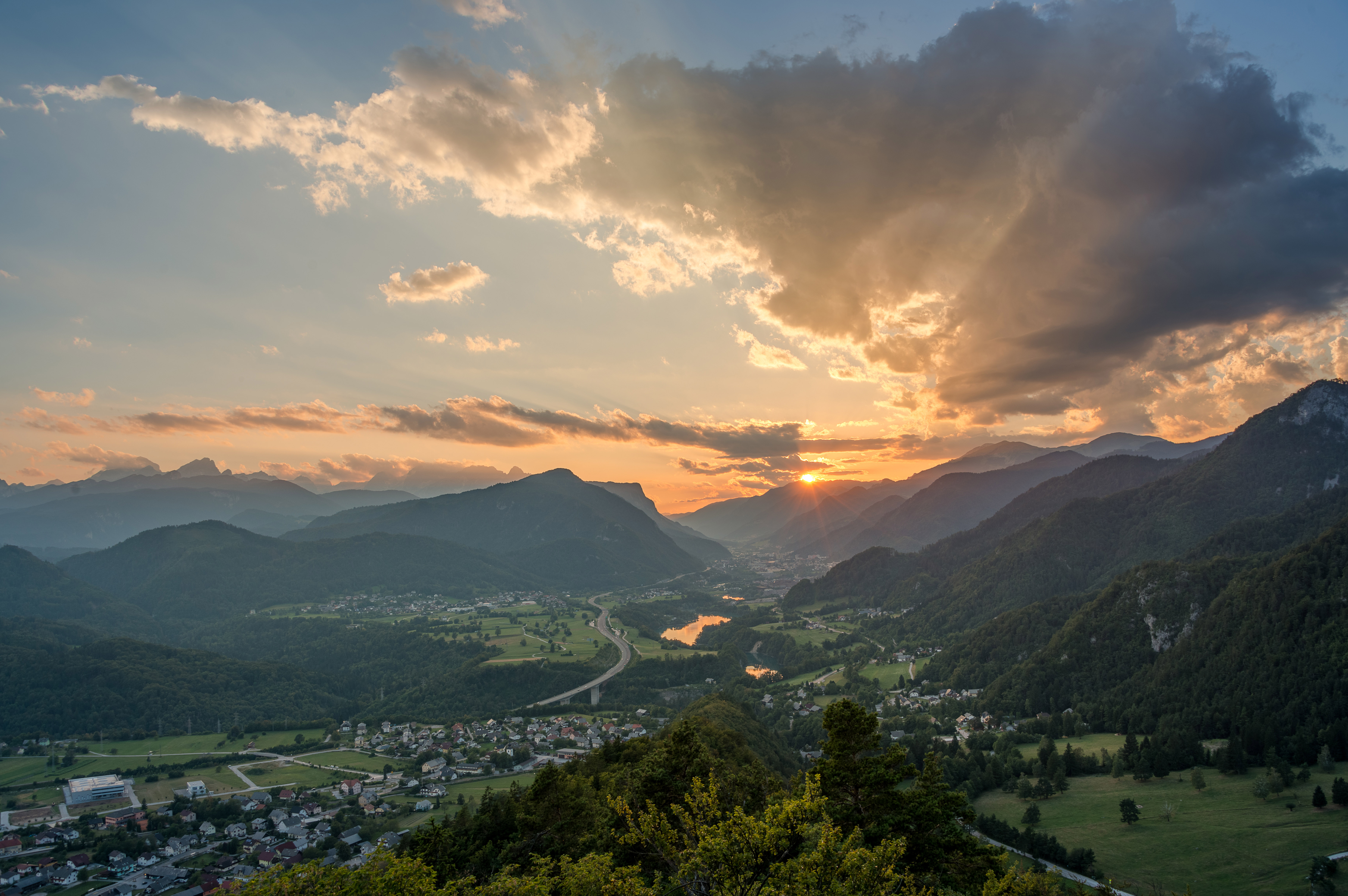
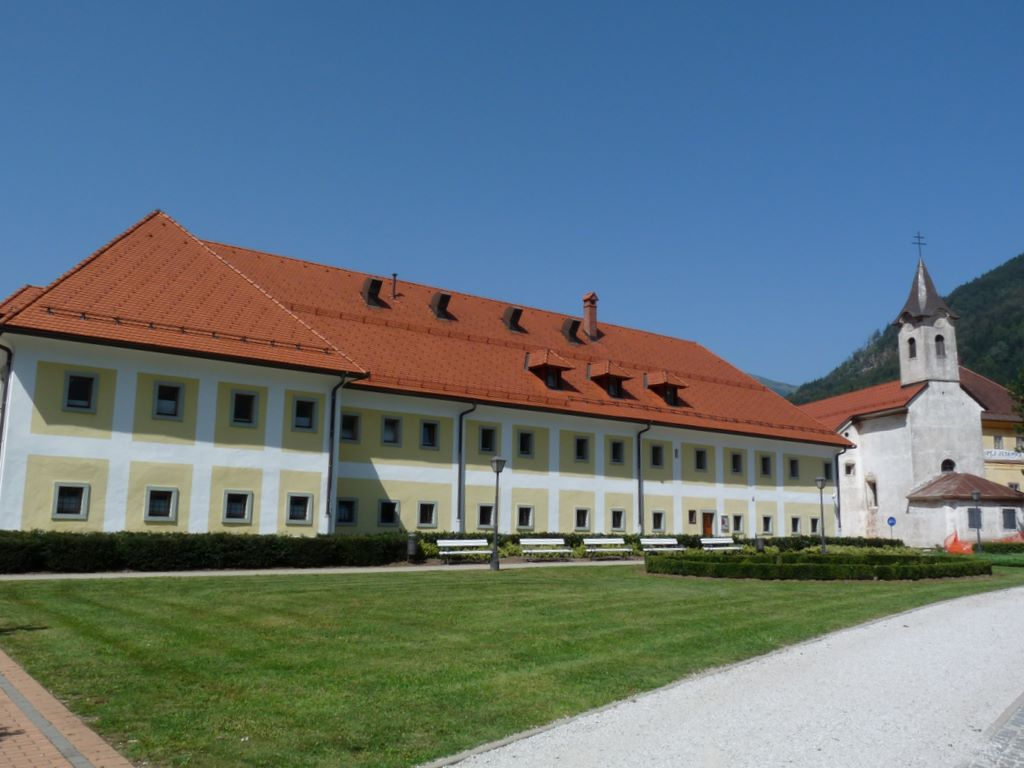
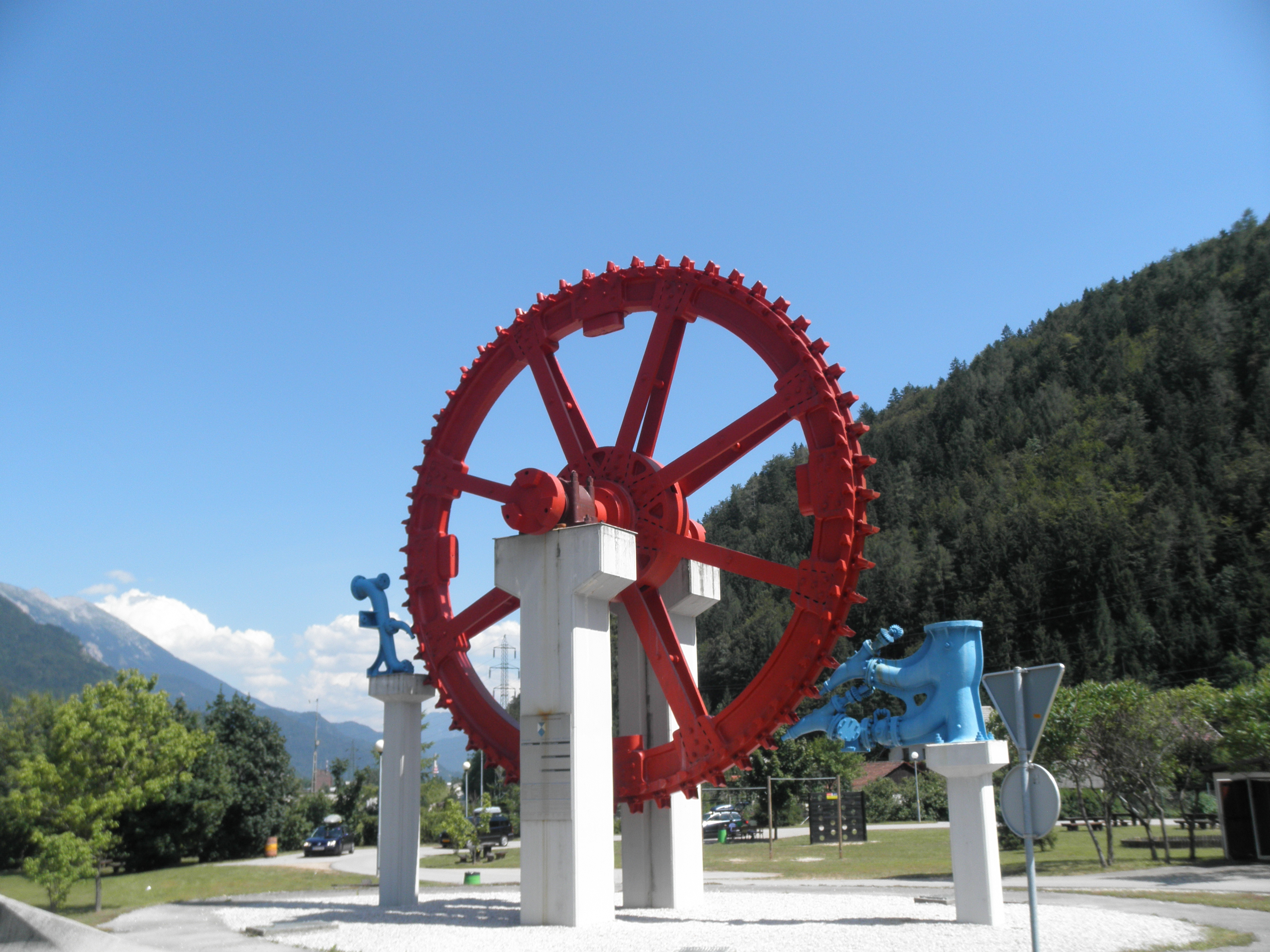
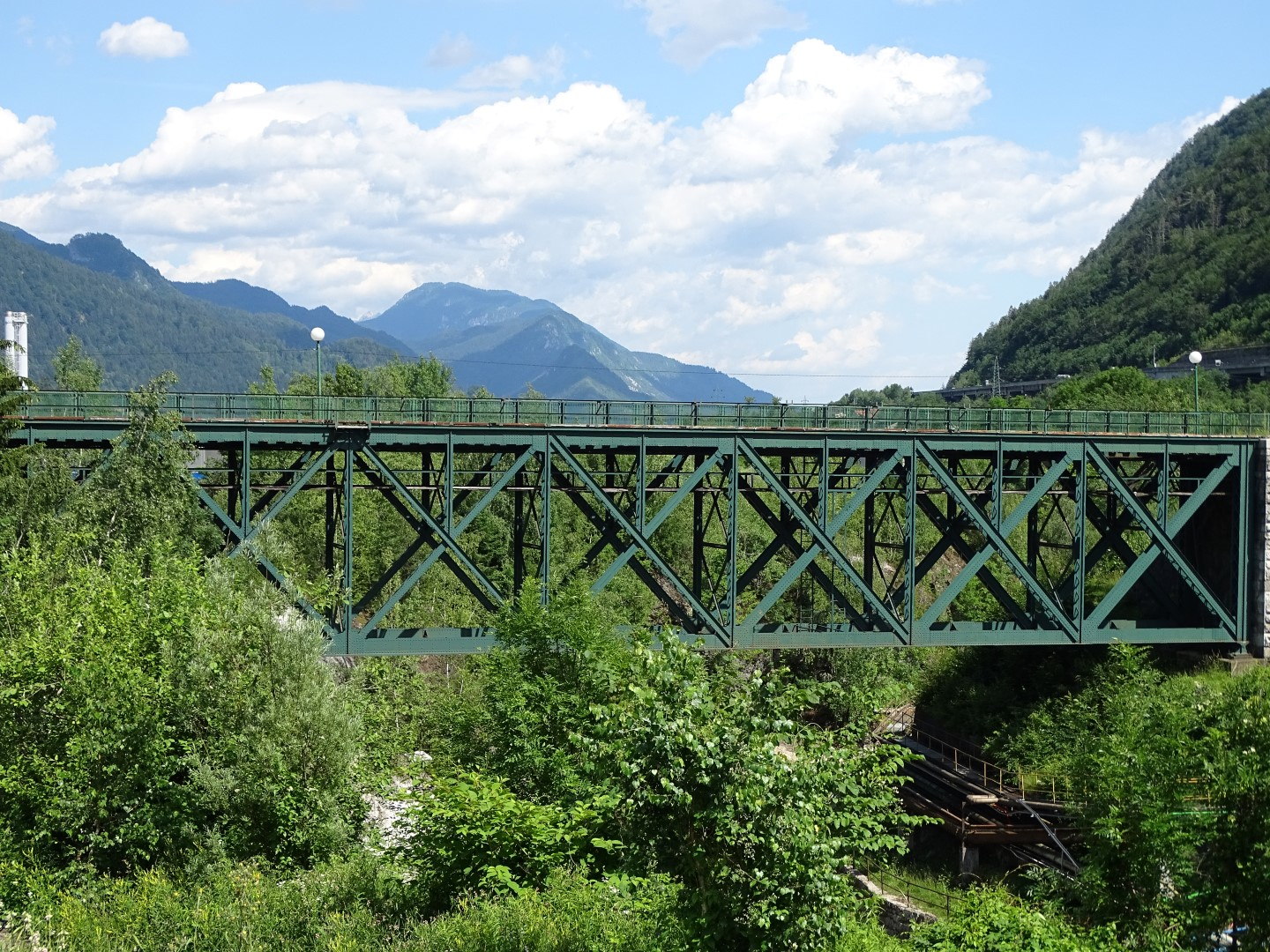
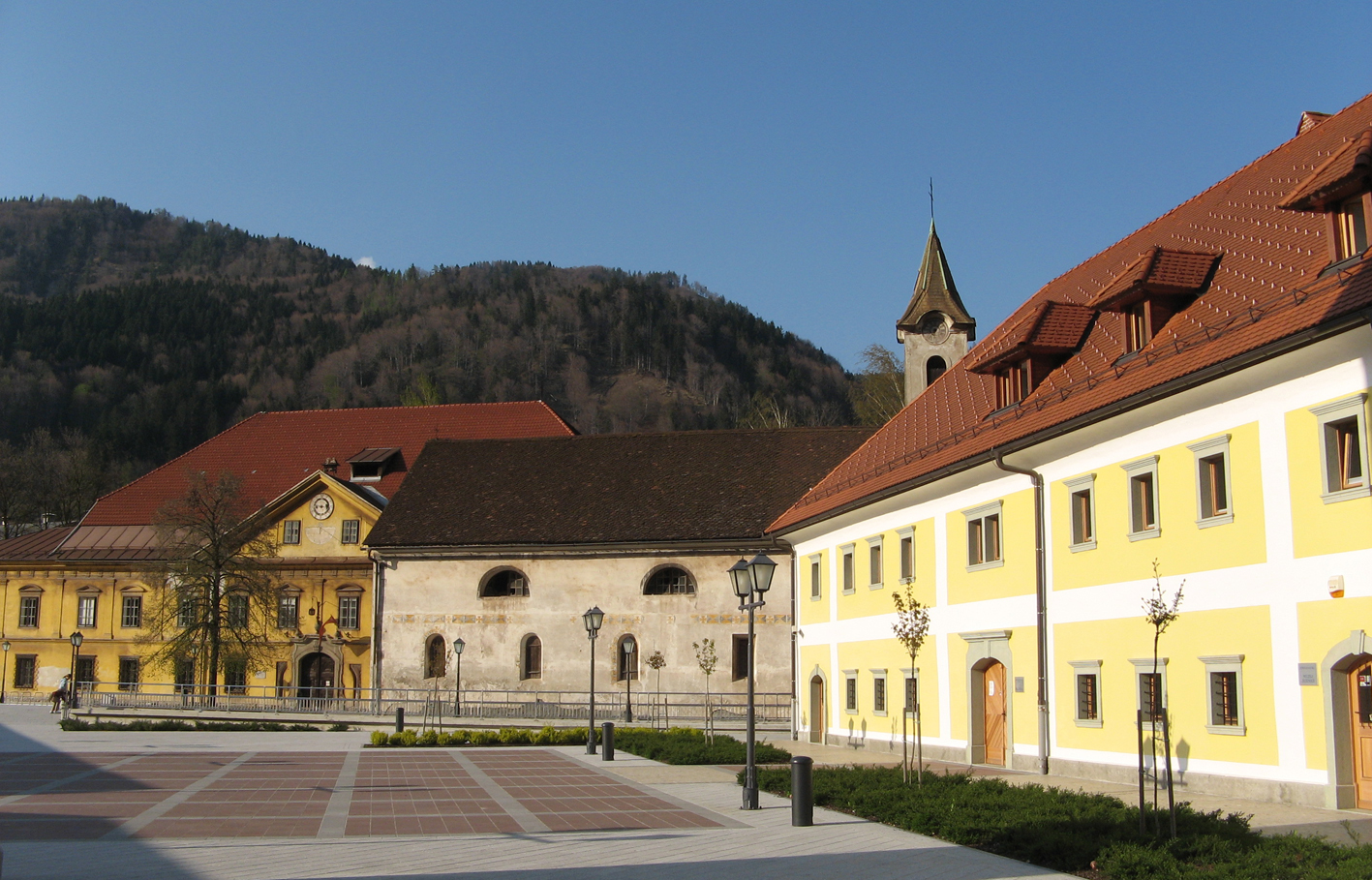
- From top, left to right: View from above, Workers' Barracks, Bucket Wheel Turbine, Iron bridge, Stara Sava

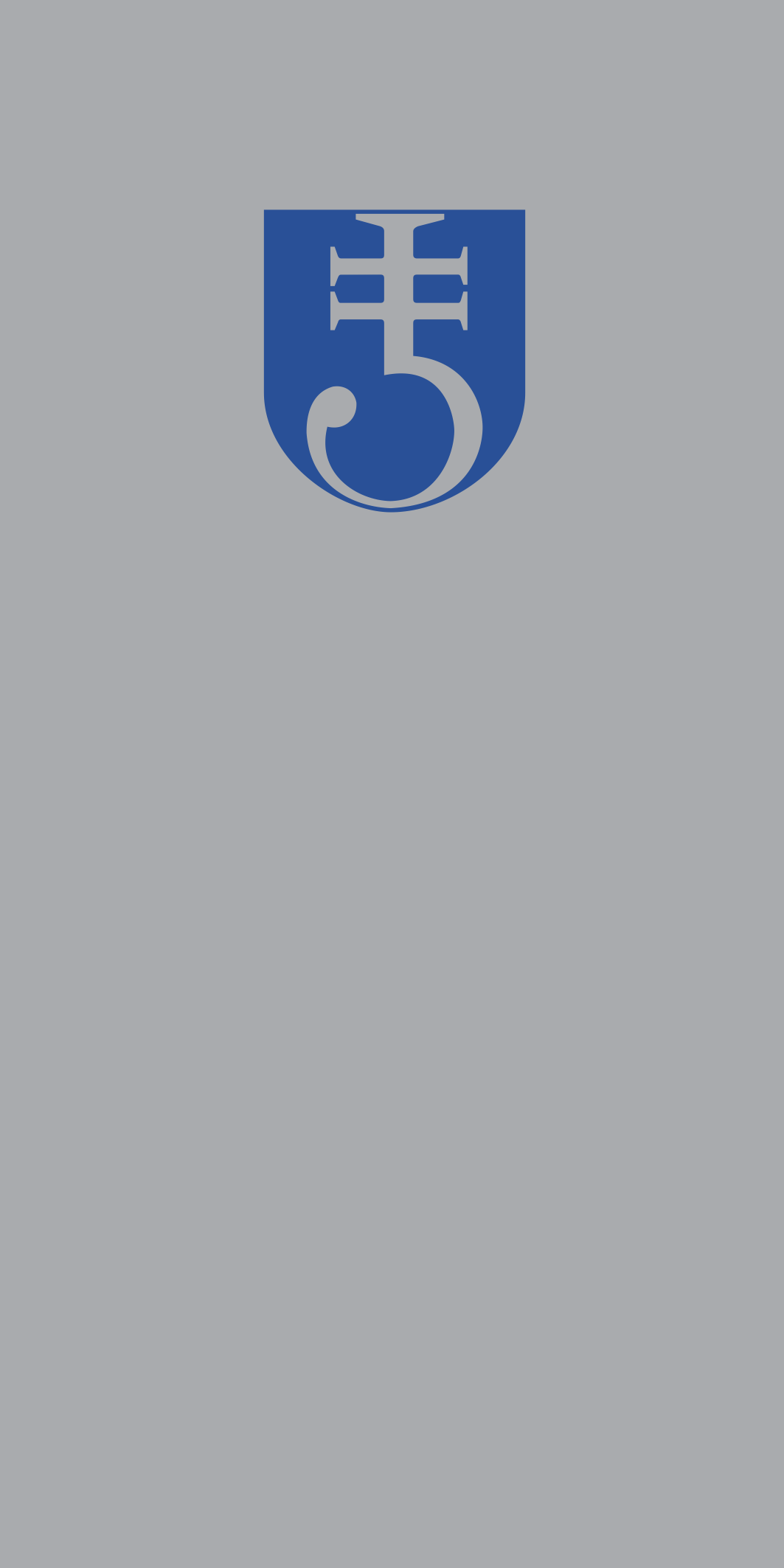
- Flag Coat of arms
- Nicknames: Town of steel and daffodils
- Location in Slovenia
- Coordinates: 46°26′11.66″N 14°3′36.62″E
- Country: Slovenia
- Statistical region: Upper Carniola
- Municipality: Jesenice
- Settled: 1538
- Incorporated: 1929

Government
  - Mayor: Peter Bohinec

Area
  - Total: 8.5 km^{2} (3.3 sq mi)
- Elevation: 585 m (1,919 ft)

Population (2013)
  - Total: 13,255
  - Rank: 12th, Slovenia
  - Density: 1,552/km^{2} (4,020/sq mi)
- Time zone: UTC+01:00 (CET)
  - Summer (DST): UTC+02:00 (CEST)
- Postal code: 4270
- Area code: 04 (+386 4 from abroad)
- Vehicle registration: KR
- Google Maps: Jesenice, Slovenia
- Website: www.jesenice.si

Jesenice (Slovene: [jɛsɛˈnìːtsɛ], German: Aßling) is the tenth-largest town in Slovenia, located in the traditional province of Upper Carniola. It is the seat of the Municipality of Jesenice spanning the southern side of the Karawanks, along Slovenia's border with Austria to the north. Renowned as a mining town, its ironworks and metallurgy industries being the driving force of the town's historical development.

== History ==
=== Name ===
Jesenice was attested in written sources in 1337 as villa de Jesenicza (and as Assnigkh and Asnigkh in 1381, and Jasnickh and Aisnstnick in 1493–1501). The name is derived from *Jesen(ьn)icě, a locative singular form of Jesenik (< *Esenьnikъ). The suffix -ě became -i in the local dialect and was reinterpreted as a nominative masculine plural, the accusative of which (in -e) was subsequently reinterpreted as today's feminine nominative plural. The name is derived from the common noun *jesenik 'ash woods' (< jesen 'ash tree'), thus originally meaning 'in the ash woods' and referring to the local vegetation. The modern German name of the town is Aßling.

=== Middle Ages ===
Jesenice was first mentioned as Assling in a 1004 deed of donation issued by King Henry II of Germany, in which nearby Bled (Veldes at the time) was also mentioned. There were no settlements there at that time, and the name Assling only marked an area on the banks of Jesenica Creek. Later, a settlement slowly started to grow around the area now known as Murova, where St. Leonard's Church is today. With the March of Carniola it passed to the Austrian House of Habsburg upon the Battle on the Marchfeld in 1278.

There are few sources for the early history of Jesenice; most of them focus on ironworks. The oldest is a set of mining rights issued to the Carinthian counts of Ortenburg, dating to 1381. According to the document, the first settlements in the area (like Planina pod Golico) were founded on the southern slopes of the Karawanks due to need for wood, flowing water for mills, and iron ore. With the development of new techniques of extraction of iron from ore, the need for water energy grew, and the small streams on the slopes of the Karawanks were no longer sufficient. The ore-extracting industry was thus relocated to the valley in 1538, when Bernardo Bucellini from Bergamo gained permission from the Habsburg King Ferdinand I to move the ironworks to a larger water source, the Sava Dolinka River, creating a settlement that was to become Jesenice. The ironworks continued to mine ore from the slopes of the Karawanks.

Members of the House of Ortenburg were the most prominent landowners in the area from the 11th century onwards. They were at their apex in the 13th century in terms of land, encompassing almost all of the Sava Valley from its source to its confluence with the Sora River. The House of Ortenburg promoted colonization of the Upper Sava Valley, especially in ore-rich areas. Throughout the 14th, 15th, and 16th centuries, small settlements of Plavž, Sava, Murova, and Slovenski Javornik were founded. By decree of King Alexander I of Yugoslavia, all of these settlements were amalgamated into the town of Jesenice on March 20, 1929.

=== Industrial growth ===
The settlements evolved independently of each other and, until the arrival of the railway at the end of the 19th century, they were only connected by a gravel road. In addition to mining and ironworking, locals made a living from agriculture and stockbreeding. Different iron foundries belonged to different owners - the Zois, Ruard and Bucelleni families. Compared to other foundries around the world at the time, the Jesenice ironworks were out of date because modernization required substantial investment funds, beyond what the Zoises, the Ruards and the Bucellenis could raise. Help was offered by the Luckmann family of bankers from Ljubljana, who agreed to modernize the iron foundries in return for the foundation of a new shareholder company.

The company, named the Carniolan Industrial Company (Slovene: Kranjska Industrijska Družba, KID) was founded by the Luckmann family on September 18, 1869. The Zois family was the first to join the company, with the Ruards following three years later. The company soon expanded its activities to the Tržič ironworks, and to Topusko in Croatia. This was the first time that all of the Upper Carniolan ironworks had been joined under a single administration, with central management in Ljubljana, and business administration in Jesenice. The greatest achievement was the scientific discovery of a process for obtaining ferromanganese in a smelting furnace, which brought KID a gold medal at the World Exhibition in Vienna in 1873, and worldwide fame. The Jesenice ironworks achieved a status as a pioneering center of technical invention in the history of ironworking. KID was also the basis for the new ironworks facility, which expanded quickly, from medieval-style iron foundries to up-to-date modern ironworks facilities in just a few years. The town of Jesenice grew fast, with a great influx of people attracted to new jobs.

=== The beginning of the 20th century ===
The political, cultural, and social life in Jesenice at the beginning of the 20th century was affected by the founding of the competing gymnastics associations, the progressive-nationalist Sokol (lit. 'Hawk') in 1904, and the Catholic Orel (lit. 'Eagle') in 1906. Other groups established at that time were a choir, a reading club, a brass band, and the Workers' Catholic Association. Three political parties—the Catholic People's Party ("Clerical"), progressive-nationalist party ("Liberal"), and Democratic Party — also became active in Jesenice, all three establishing their own cultural and gymnastics associations. Germans had a great influence in Jesenice at that time, though Orel and Sokol, both being nationally oriented, contributed as well.

The first railway tracks were laid through Jesenice in 1870, and construction of a railway station followed soon after. This made Jesenice better connected with the world, and facilitated its export trade. Construction of the Karawanks-Bohinj Railway was started in 1905, which was a very complicated project because it required drilling two tunnels: one to Austria through the Karawanks, and the other through Mount Kobla in Bohinj to allow faster access to the seaport of Trieste, then in Austria-Hungary. When the tunnels were completed, the railway line was opened to traffic in a special ceremony attended by Archduke Franz Ferdinand of Austria. The rolling mills were relocated from Jesenice to Slovenski Javornik in 1904. Stockholders wanted to cover the expenses of relocation by lowering workers' wages, which led to the first strike in Jesenice, involving around 400 workers. The strike lasted for six weeks, with strikers only partially achieving their goal.

=== World War I ===
During World War I, Jesenice ironworks were mainly converted to the manufacture of materiel for the Central Powers. With the front lines being some distance to the south, the war did not reach Jesenice, which only suffered one bombing attack by Italian aircraft, with no casualties. With the end of World War I came major political changes; on December 1, 1918, the Kingdom of Serbs, Croats, and Slovenes was formed, opening up new markets. Due to its border position, Jesenice became an important traffic junction. Between the wars, the first grammar school was established in 1914. The first "boys' and girls' school" was established in 1920, offering higher education. Jesenice was also the center of various kinds of craft and small trade. A tradesman's union was formed in 1920. Development of the ironworks continued; 4,567 workers were affiliated to a greater or lesser extent with KID by 1937.

=== World War II ===
Italy occupied Jesenice on April 11, 1941, with the Germans taking over eight days later. This resulted in immediate arrests of some of the workers' leaders, educated and culture-affiliated individuals, and all of the Romany people. Forced mobilization and recruitment followed soon after. The Germans were aware of the strategic and industrial importance of Jesenice, so they soon began with a program of assimilation, introducing school teaching in the German language only, while they also Germanized public signs, and more. These measures led to the formation of the Partisan movement in Jesenice, including the Cankar Brigade.

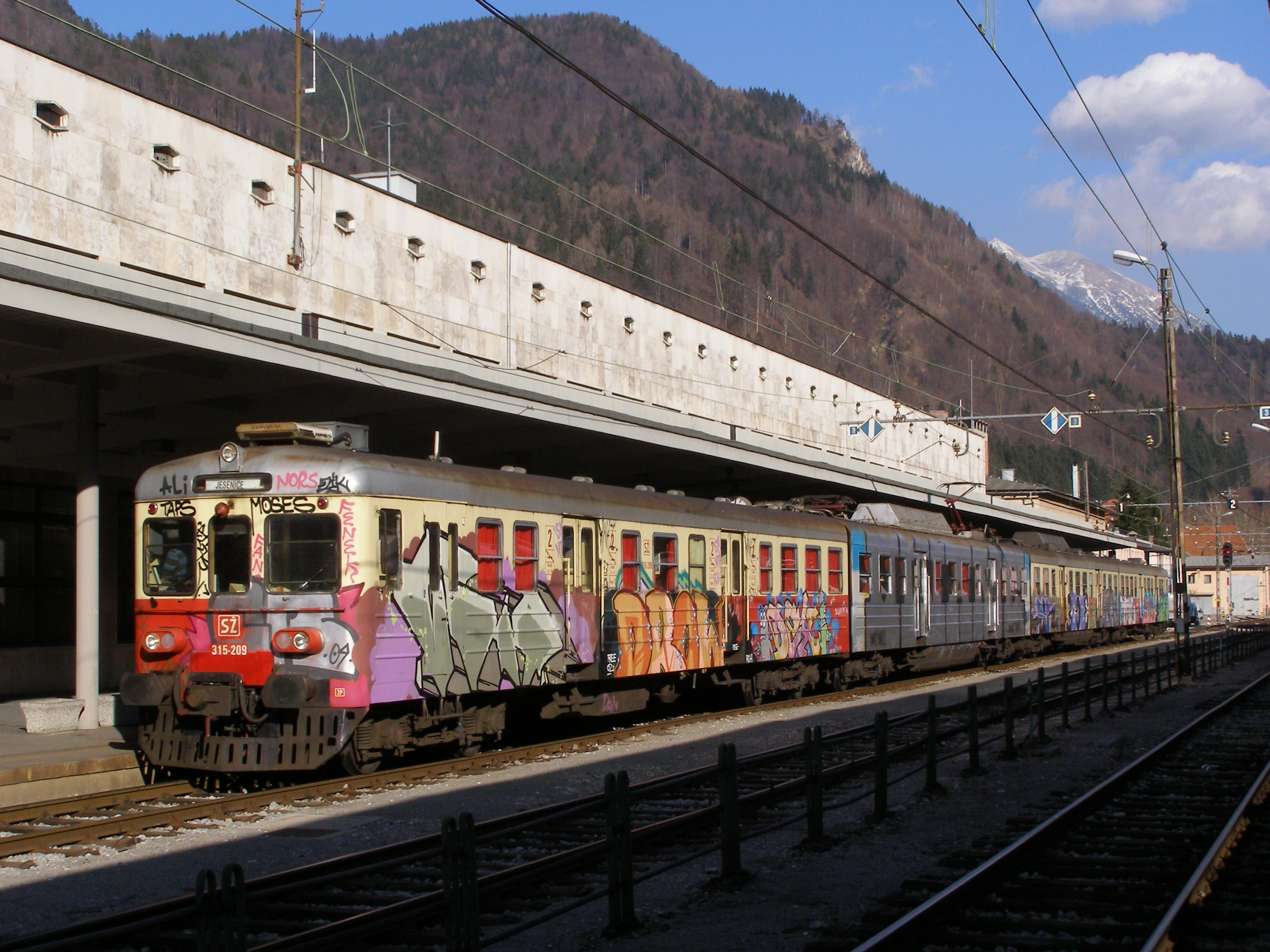
Jesenice Railway Station

The steel industry was again diverted to German military needs, and the German management started importing French workers, followed by Italian workers after Italian capitulation in 1943. Sabotage of the German-led steel industry was problematic, because people were more sympathetic to the resistance, which by the end of the second world war proved to be ineffective. Before the end of World War II, Jesenice had undergone a severe sabotage-bombing by Allied forces, which came in two waves on March 1, 1945. There were many casualties, and great damage was done to the town's center, including the destruction of the train station. The ironworks secondary school was founded by KID on November 19, 1938. The first high school was established at the end of the war in 1945, for which KID also founded a staff-apprenticeship school in 1938.

=== Second half of the 20th century ===
With the end of World War II followed a new economic golden age. Soon after the war, two more smelting furnaces were put into operation. The Jesenice ironworks became one of the main steel manufacturers, charged with the rebuilding of the newly founded Socialist Federal Republic of Yugoslavia, and started employing more people than ever before. Many more industrial plants were built to increase production, while Jesenice began to develop into its present shape. As the population also increased with new immigrant workers, massive building of apartment blocks, and residential sections took place. Cultural, sports, school, medical and traffic infrastructure was built. Jesenice became the center of black metallurgy in Slovenia. Introduction of electrical steel processing marked the era of manufacturing steel of higher quality, and in greater quantities. At its economic peak in the 1970s, the ironworks employed more than 8,000 people.

After the collapse of Socialist Federal Republic of Yugoslavia, economic policies changed, and the Jesenice ironworks could not compete with the better developed Western metallurgy. Another problem was the loss of access to raw material resources, which are located in the other, now separately independent republics of what had been Yugoslavia. This led to massive layoffs, and the emigration of people in search of new jobs. In the years since the declaration of Slovenian independence in 1991, Jesenice has become much less dependent on its metallurgic industry, and has started to develop other aspects of its economy.

== Geography and climate ==
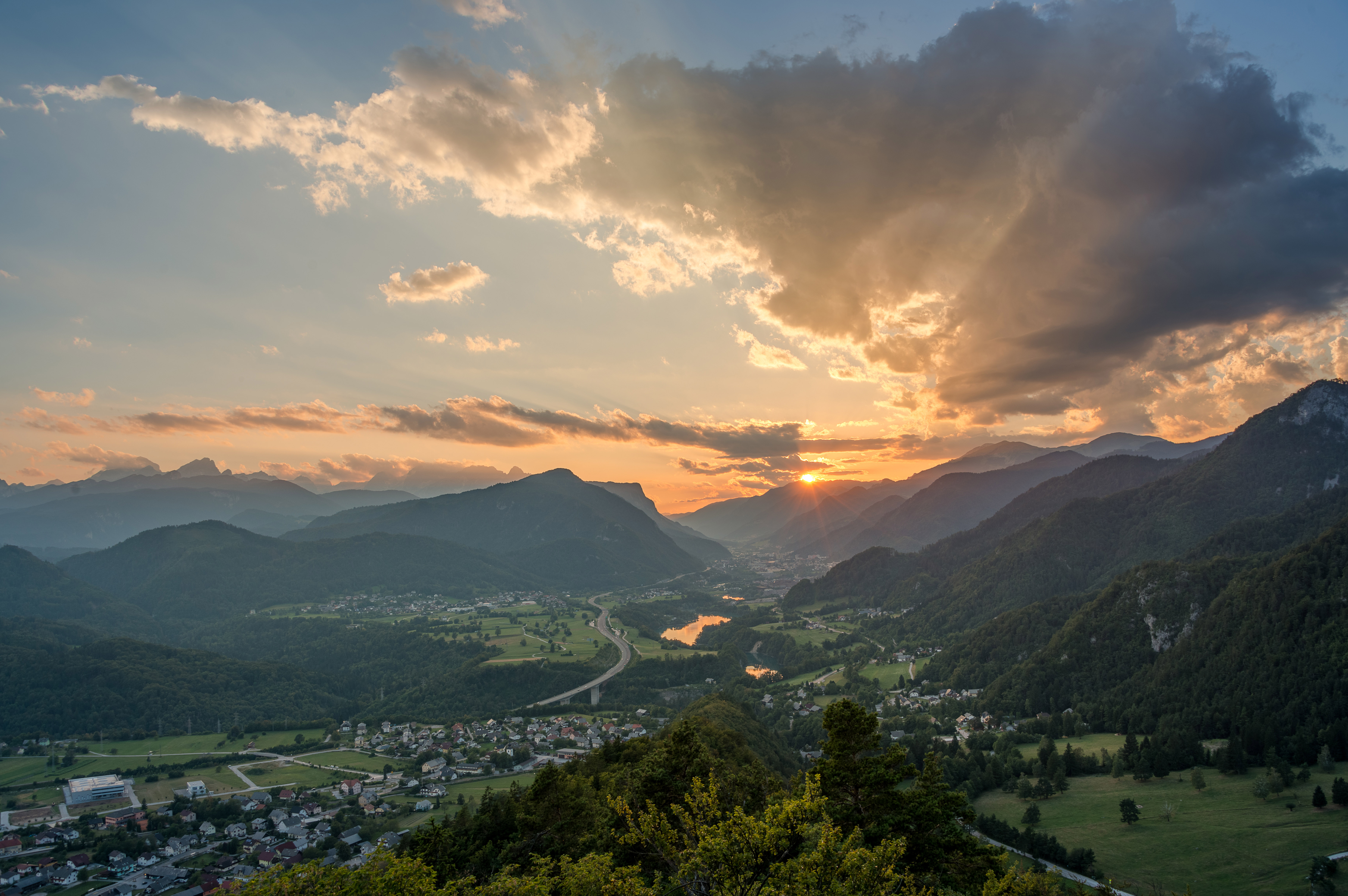
Sunset over Jesenice

Jesenice lies in the Upper Carniolan region, in the Upper Sava Valley. The municipality is surrounded by the Karawanks and Austrian border to the north, and Mežakla plateau to the south. The hamlet of Planina pod Golico is 5 kilometers (3.1 mi) north of Jesenice, and is popular with tourists, especially in springtime when the wild pheasant's eye daffodils are in bloom. The resort village of Kranjska Gora is 25 kilometers (16 mi) northwest of Jesenice, and the picturesque tourist destination of Bled lies 10 kilometers (6.2 mi) to the southeast. Other neighboring settlements include Hrušica, Slovenski Javornik, and Koroška Bela.

Jesenice's climate is transitional between temperate and continental, with influences of alpine.

== Government ==
Three political parties have been prominent throughout Jesenice's history; they are currently known as the Liberal Democracy of Slovenia (LDS), the Slovenian People's Party (SLS), and the Slovenian Democratic Party (SDS). Another influential political party is the Social Democrats (SD).

Tomaž Tom Mencinger of the Social Democrats has been the mayor of the Municipality of Jesenice since 2006.

=== Economy ===
With Slovenia joining the European Union and its funding resources in 2004, Jesenice began a massive urban reconstruction. Current projects include rebuilding some old parts of Jesenice, building a second high school and improvements to existing sporting facilities.

Almost all of the 1950s steelmill buildings were demolished. The existing ironworks has undergone massive modernization, and it currently employs around 1,350 workers. A new town-center with a new seat of local government was built in the former industrial part of town. Two shopping centers were also constructed, one in the new town-center, and a larger one in Plavž.

== Transportation ==
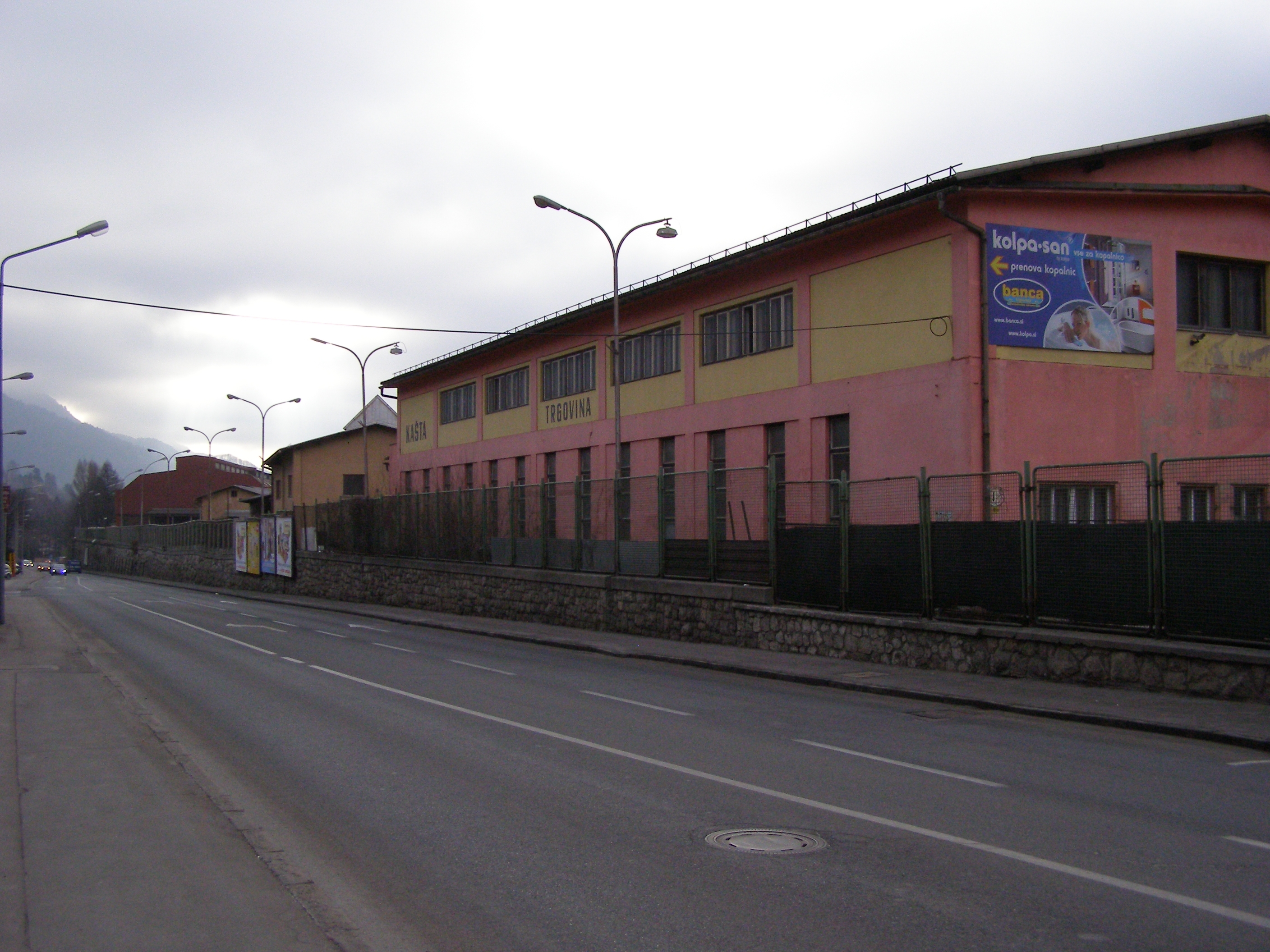
The regional R-201/R-452 road, near the town-center

Jesenice has good road connections. The shortest route from Austria leads through the Karawanks Tunnel to Jesenice. Regional road R-201/R-452 leads from Italy via Kranjska Gora to Jesenice. The A2 motorway leads from Ljubljana via Jesenice to Austria, and further on to Germany.

Jesenice is an important railway junction, linking the town with neighboring Austria. There are daily trains going to Nova Gorica and further on to Italy, while international trains from Zagreb stop in Jesenice before continuing their way to Germany and Switzerland.

Bus and coach traffic is also well developed, with numerous stops and connections to other places in Slovenia. Tickets can be purchased in the local travel agency Alpetour, or directly from the bus or coach driver. Jesenice is only 48 kilometers away from Ljubljana Airport.

== Education ==
Jesenice has one college, two secondary schools, two primary schools, as well as music schools.

- Jesenice College of Nursing (Slovene: Visoka šola za zdravstveno nego Jesenice) is a nursing college, established in 2006. It is the first such program in Slovenia, accredited by the state Council for Higher Education in line with European directives, and the Bologna declaration.
- Jesenice Secondary School (Slovene: Srednja Šola Jesenice) offers 4-year vocational courses in technical and medicinal subjects. It was established in 1938, and is locally known by its former name of Ironworks Education Center (Slovene: Železarski Izobraževalni Center, ŽIC).
- Jesenice High School (Slovene: Gimnazija Jesenice) is a preparatory school that was founded in 1945.
- Tone Cufar Primary School (Slovene: Osnovna šola Toneta Čufarja Jesenice) is named after the local writer Tone Čufar.
- Prezihov Voranc Primary School (Slovene: Osnovna šola Prežihovega Voranca Jesenice) is named after the writer and activist Prežihov Voranc.

== Religion ==
The largest religious community in Jesenice are Catholics, though due to the need of labor force for the steel industry in the past, there is a large portion of other ex-Yugoslav immigrants, including many Muslims who migrated from Bosnia and Herzegovina. There are also many Orthodox Christians, who migrated from Serbia. A significant portion of Jesenice's populace today describe themselves as atheists.

There are several religious buildings in Jesenice, including the parish church dedicated to St. Leonard in Murova, the parish church dedicated to St. Barbara in Plavž, Assumption and St. Roch Church in Old Sava, and the Mosque on Viktor Kejžar Street. There are also several non-traditional house churches of various affiliations, established just before Slovenian independence in 1991.

== Sports ==
Jesenice is known for its ice hockey club, HK Acroni Jesenice. Anze Kopitar, captain of the Los Angeles Kings of the National Hockey League (NHL), was born and raised in Jesenice.

== Industry ==
The town is the seat of the largest Slovene steel company Acroni.

== Tourism ==
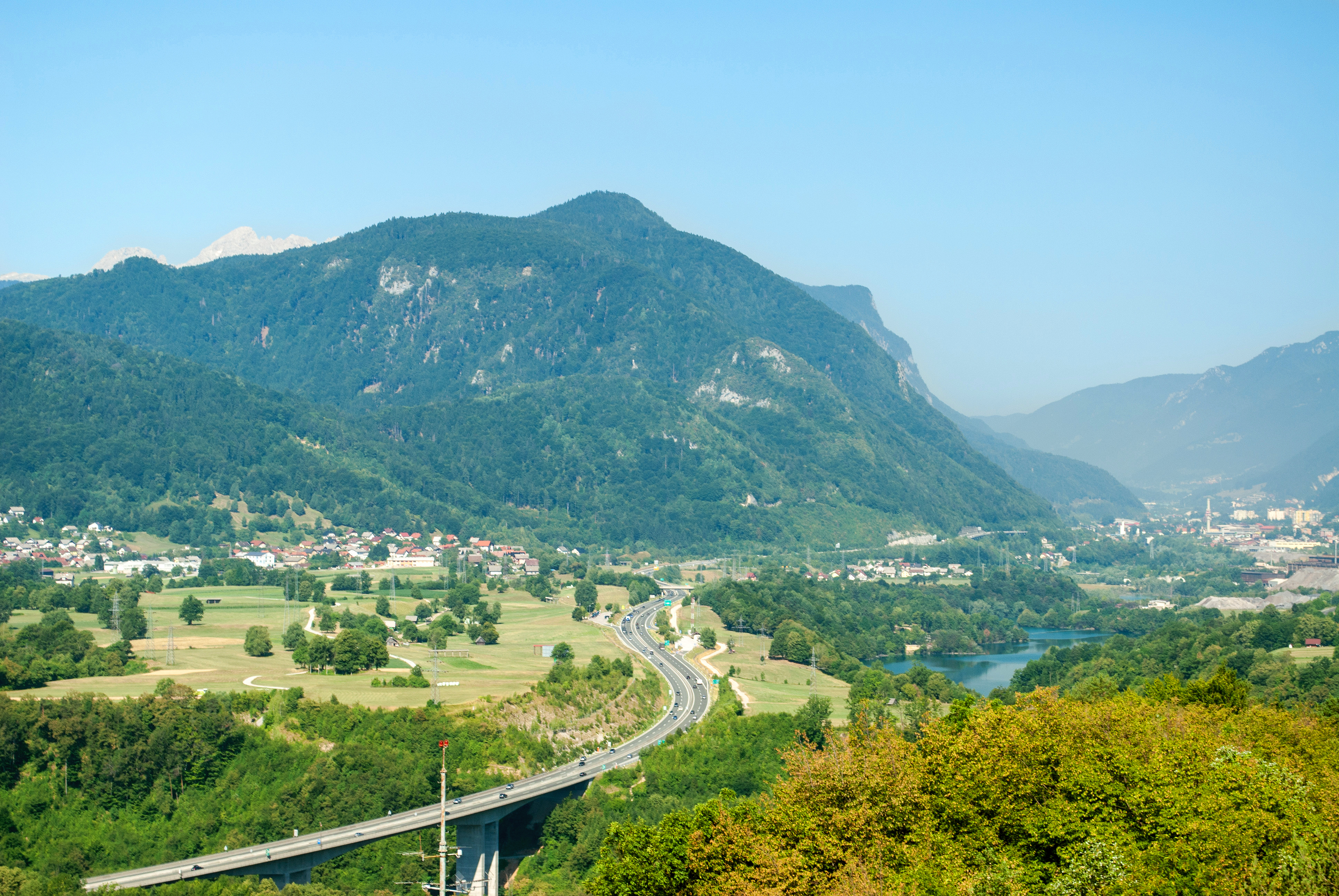
A2 motorway, with Jesenice on the right

Places to visit in Jesenice include:

- The Upper Sava Museum, consisting of the ironworks collection in Ruard Manor located in Old Sava neighborhood, the gallery and local-history exhibits focusing on the workers' movement and World War II in Kos Manor located in Murova neighborhood, and an ethnographic collection in Worker Barracks located in Old Sava.
- One of the towering smokestacks of the old steel mill has been preserved as a landmark; the illuminated red star that formerly decorated its side has been replaced by advertising billboards.
- There is Tone Cufar Theatre and Cinema, ice hockey rink in Podmežakla Hall, as well as a few pubs and bars.
- There are numerous scenic places in the nearby countryside: one can hike or cycle up to Planina pod Golico or Pristava, where swathes of white daffodils bloom in springtime. Planina pod Golico is also a good starting point for hikes further up into the mountains, to Golica, Rožca, Španov vrh, or the municipality's highest mountain Vajnež (at 2,104 meters).
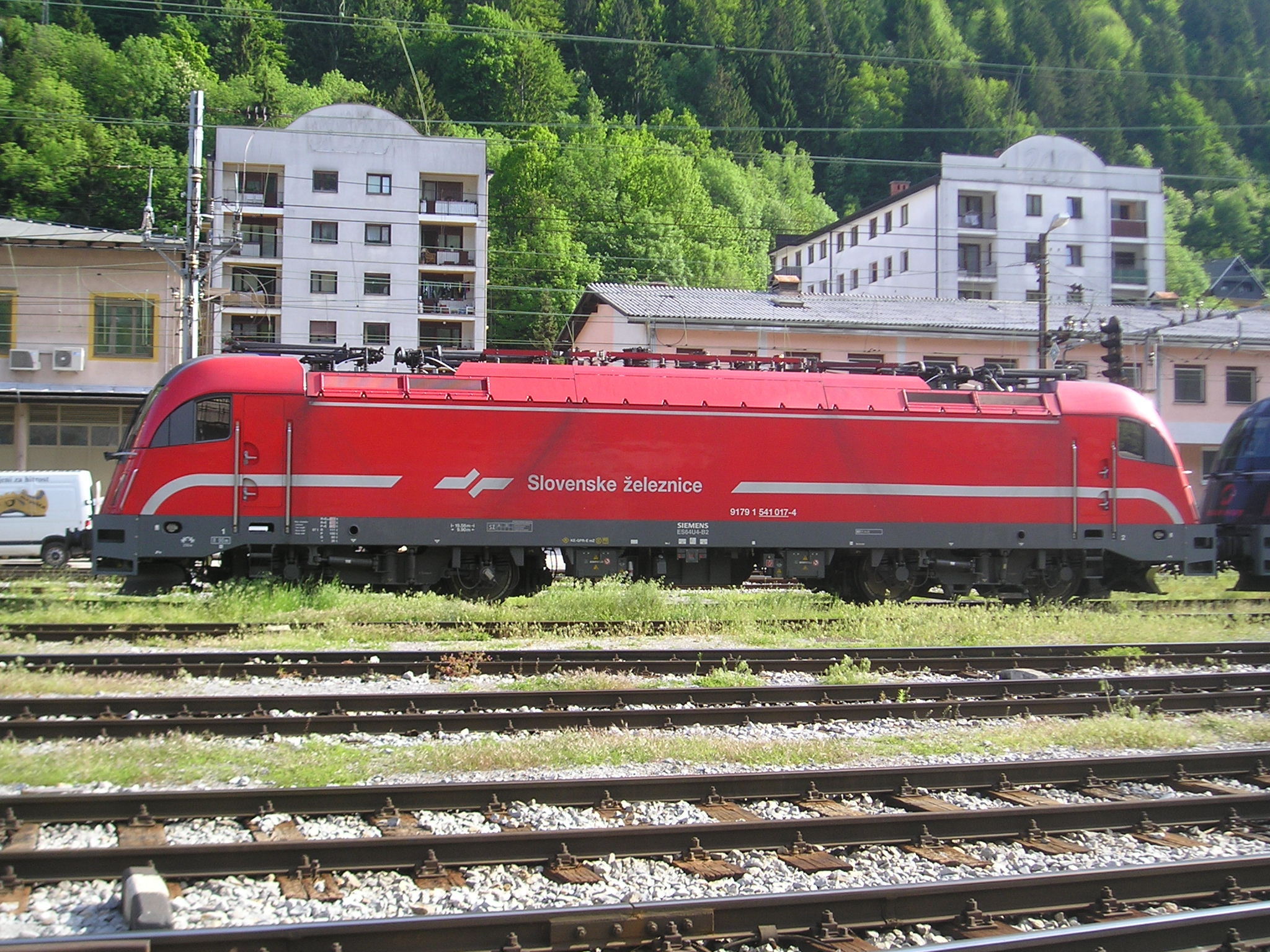
Railway station, with old town-center in the back

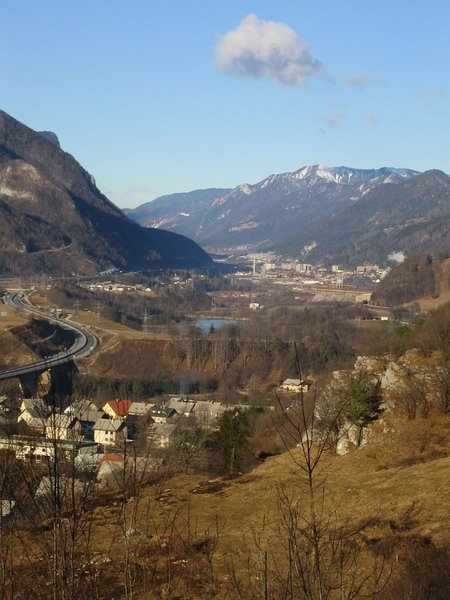
View of Jesenice from the east

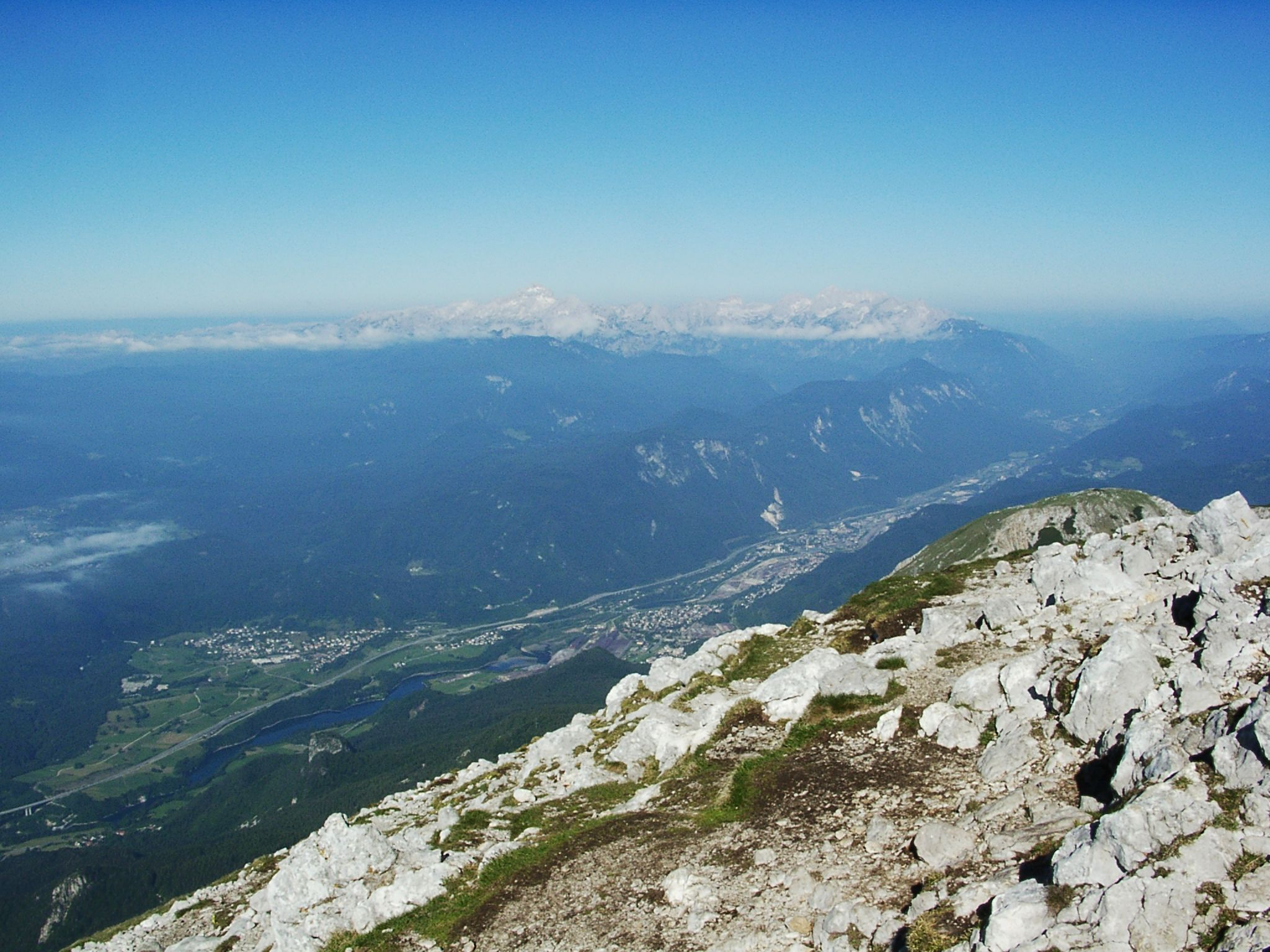
View of Jesenice from Stol

== Notable people ==
Notable people that were born or lived in Jesenice include:

- Miha Baloh (born 1928), actor
- Tone Čufar (1905–1942), writer
- Anja Klinar (born 1988), swimmer
- Anže Kopitar (born 1987), ice hockey player
- Tomo Križnar (born 1954), peace activist, writer
- Thomas Luckmann (born 1927), sociologist
- Miha Mazzini (born 1961), writer, screenwriter, film director
- Janez Modic (1846 – after 1892), beekeeper
- Odon Peterka (1925–1945), poet
- Teodora Poštič (born 1984), figure skater
- Jure Robič (1965–2010), ultra marathon cyclist
- Miral Samardžić (born 1987), footballer
- Rudi Šeligo (1935–2004), writer and politician
- Rok Urbanc (born 1985), ski jumper
- Gregor Urbas (born 1982), figure skater
- Milena Zupančič (born 1946), actress
- Rašid Mahalbašić (born 1990), professional basketball player
- Arjan Malić (born 2005), Bosnian football player
- Zoran Stevanović (born 1982), politician

== International relations ==
=== Twin towns and sister cities ===
Jesenice are twinned with:

- Nagold, Germany
- Sankt Jakob im Rosental, Austria
- Tarvisio, Italy
- Valjevo, Serbia
