= Jesenice Mosque =

Mosque in Jesenice, Slovenia

- Džamija Jesenice
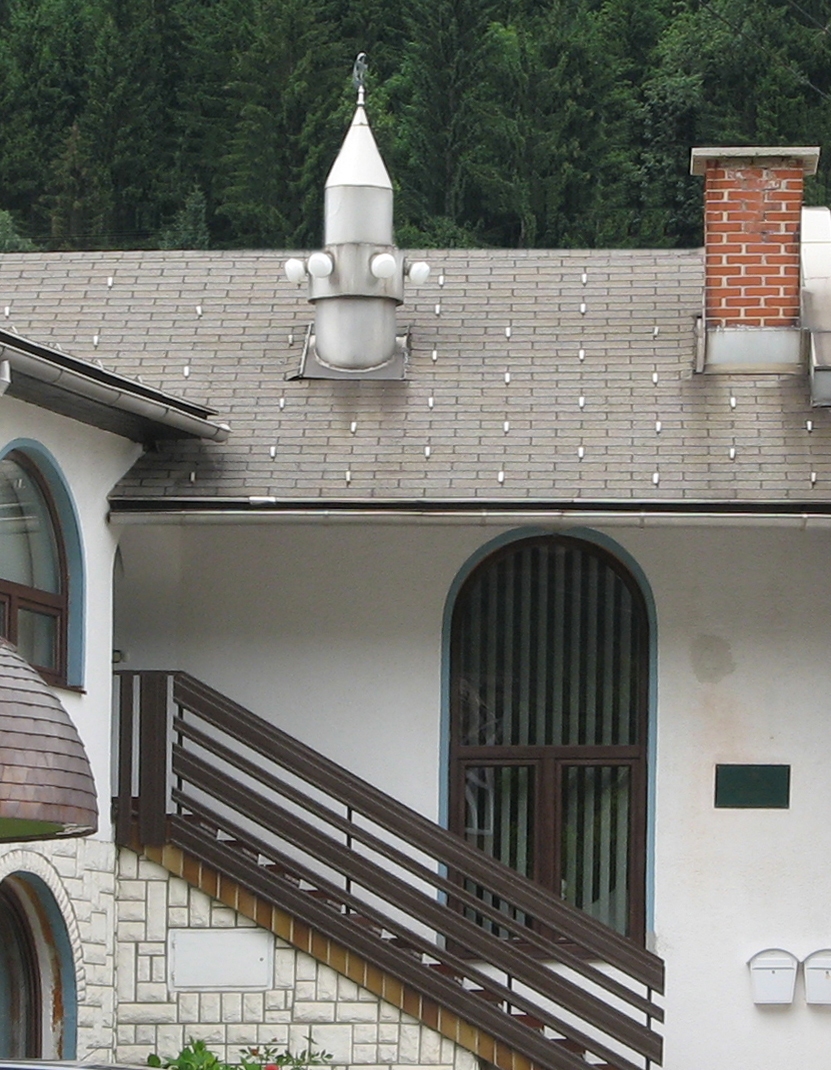

- Slovenia

Religion
- Affiliation: Islam
- Branch/tradition: Sunni

Location
- Location: Jesenice Town, Municipality of Jesenice, Slovenia
- Interactive map of Jesenice Mosque
- Coordinates: 46°26′1.15″N 14°3′53.73″E

Architecture
- Type: mosque

The Jesenice Mosque (Slovene: Džamija Jesenice, Bosnian: Mesdžid Jesenice) is a Sunni mosque located in the town of Jesenice, Municipality of Jesenice, Slovenia, on Viktor Kejžar street, no 19. It is the center of the Jesenice jamaat.

Many Muslims were among the wave of migrants from other Yugoslav republics attracted to Jesenice by steel-industry jobs in the 1960s and 1970s. In the 2002 census, 18% of the population of Jesenice were listed as Muslim, the highest percentage of any single municipality in Slovenia.

The first Islamic observances in Jesenice took place in July 1969, when Mawlid was celebrated in a temporary hall in the railway station. The current mosque was bought in 1988, and its first governing community board established in October 1989. The building was renovated to its present appearance in 1992, when an 80 cm minaret was also added.

The Jesenice jamaat serves the area of Jesenice, Bled, Radovljica, Žirovnica, Kranjska Gora, Bohinjska Bistrica and Lesce with a total Muslim population of over 5,000, mostly hailing from Western Bosnia, North Macedonia and Kosovo.

A library, a classroom, an ablution fountain and the Imam's offices and quarters are also part of the complex.

== See also ==
- Islam in Slovenia
