= St. Leonard's Church (Jesenice) =

Roman Catholic Parish Church in Jesenice, Slovenia

Coordinates: 46°26′19.04″N 14°2′59.06″E

St. Leonard's Church (Slovene: Župnijska cerkev svetega Lenarta) is a Roman Catholic Parish Church located in the town of Jesenice in northwestern Slovenia. It belongs to the Archdiocese of Ljubljana.

== History ==
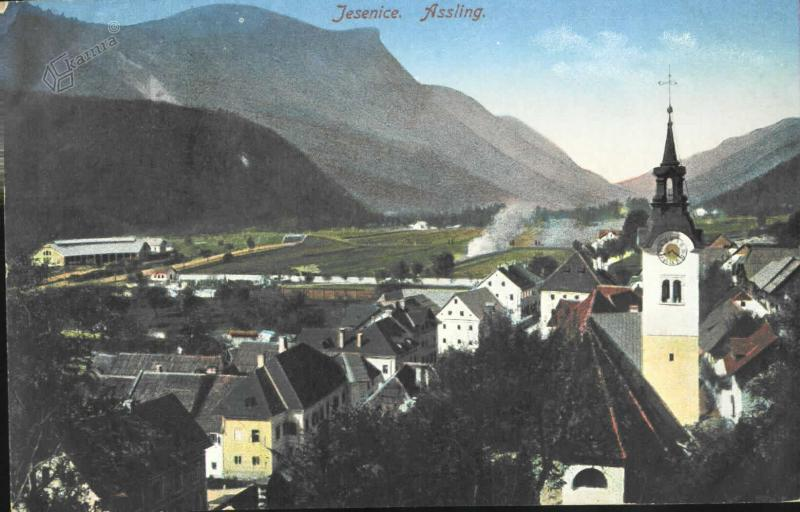
The church in 1913

The church stands on a small hill in the Murova neighborhood, the town's historic core, and is dedicated to Saint Leonard of Noblac. It is first mentioned in documents dating to 1460 and was originally dedicated to Mary Magdalene. The original Gothic church had a rectangular nave and pentagonal presbytery, and was surrounded with a defensive wall, fortified with three square towers, one of which partially survives in the southern support wall. The building saw a major reconstruction in 1524 and a Baroque remodel in the early 18th century.

The west facade features a statue of the Risen Christ on a column, a result of an expressionist-inspired 1930s renovation, planned and to a great degree carried out by the architects Dragotin Fatur (a student of Jože Plečnik) and Miro Kos. In the 1960s, the church was again partially remodeled by Ivan Pengov. Most of the church's present appearance is a result of the renovations. Exceptions include the gothic floor plan, Baroque ceiling decorations in the presbytery, and the gothic portal leading to the belfry. Of the former baroque altars only a few statues and paintings they once held survive. The pipe organ casing was made in 1936 in Šentvid. The stained glass in the eastern lunette and south window wes manufactured in 1969 in Zagreb, according to Pengov's plans. The church contains paintings by well-known local artists such as Tone Kralj, Matevž Langus and Ivan Vavpotič.
