= Tone Čufar =

Slovenian writer

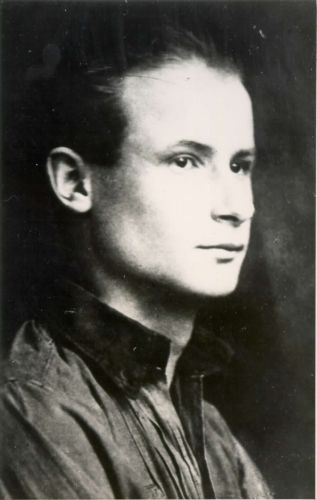
- Born: November 14, 1905; Jesenice, Austria-Hungary (now Slovenia)
- Died: August 11, 1942 (aged 36); Šentvid, Nazi Germany (now Slovenia)
- Occupations: Writer, Playwright

Tone Čufar (14 November 1905 – 11 August 1942) was a Slovene writer, a playwright and a poet.

== Biography ==
Tone Čufar was born in Jesenice as the third son of a factory carpenter. Because of his poor health his parents sent him to work as a shepherd with his uncle in Bohinjska Bela. This and the outbreak of World War I (1914–1918) meant that he did not attend school regularly and had no formal education. He was eventually trained to be a carpenter in Ljubljana and returned to Jesenice after his training. He joined the Young Communist League of Yugoslavia in 1929. In 1932, he joined the Slovene Social Writers' Club and decided to make a living through writing. He also began working as a journalist and an editor. In 1936, he was arrested and imprisoned in Ljubljana for his activities in the workers' movement. He was sent to Belgrade to serve a one-year prison sentence and lost his citizen's rights for a further five years. He later moved to Maribor and worked for a local newspaper.

After the outbreak of World War II, he fled to Ljubljana, where he soon became active in the Slovene Liberation Front. He was arrested by Italian authorities in Ljubljana and sent to the Gonars concentration camp. On 10 August 1942, the authorities moved him and some other prisoners to Šentvid near Ljubljana in order to hand them over to the Germans. He tried to escape and was shot.

== Work ==
Most of Čufar's works have a working-class theme.

=== Poetry ===
- Tovarna ('Factory')
- Iz jeseniške fabrike ('From the Jesenice Factory')
- Mi, proletarska mladina ('We, the Proletarian Youth')
- Sončna molitev ('Sun Prayer')
- Železobeton ('Steel-Reinforced Concrete')
- Pionirji novega sveta ('Pioneers of the New World')
- Mladi jetnici ('To a Young Female Detainee')

=== Prose ===
- Tragedija v kleti ('Tragedy in the Cellar')
- Marija bi rada živela ('Maria Would Like to Live')
- Nova gaz ('New Track')
- Pod kladivom ('Under the Hammer')
- Deklica iz revirja ('Girl from the District')
- Tovarna ('Factory')

=== Plays ===
- Rdeči svit ('Red Dawn')
- Polom ('Disaster')
- Ameriška tatvina ('American Theft')
- Ljubezen v kleti ('Love in the Cellar')
- Mali Babilon ('Little Babylon')

== Commemoration ==
Three elementary schools, in Jesenice, in Ljubljana, and in Maribor, are named after Čufar. In addition, the theatre in Jesenice is named Tone Čufar Theatre.

In the second half of the 20th century, three bronze busts of Tone Čufar were erected in Jesenice. The first, in the hall of the Tone Čufar Theatre, was made by Anton Sigulin in 1958. The second, in front of Tone Čufar Primary School, was made by Nika Hafner in 1962–63. The third, standing in the Plavž Memorial Park, was made by Jaka Torkar in 1988. It was stolen in January 2008 and replaced in April 2008 with a replica of the bust in front of the school. Nika Hafner also created the statue of Čufar that is on display in Tone Čufar Primary School in Ljubljana.
