= Workers' Barracks =

Museum in Jessnice, Slovenia

Coordinates: 46°25′56.56″N 14°3′27.02″E

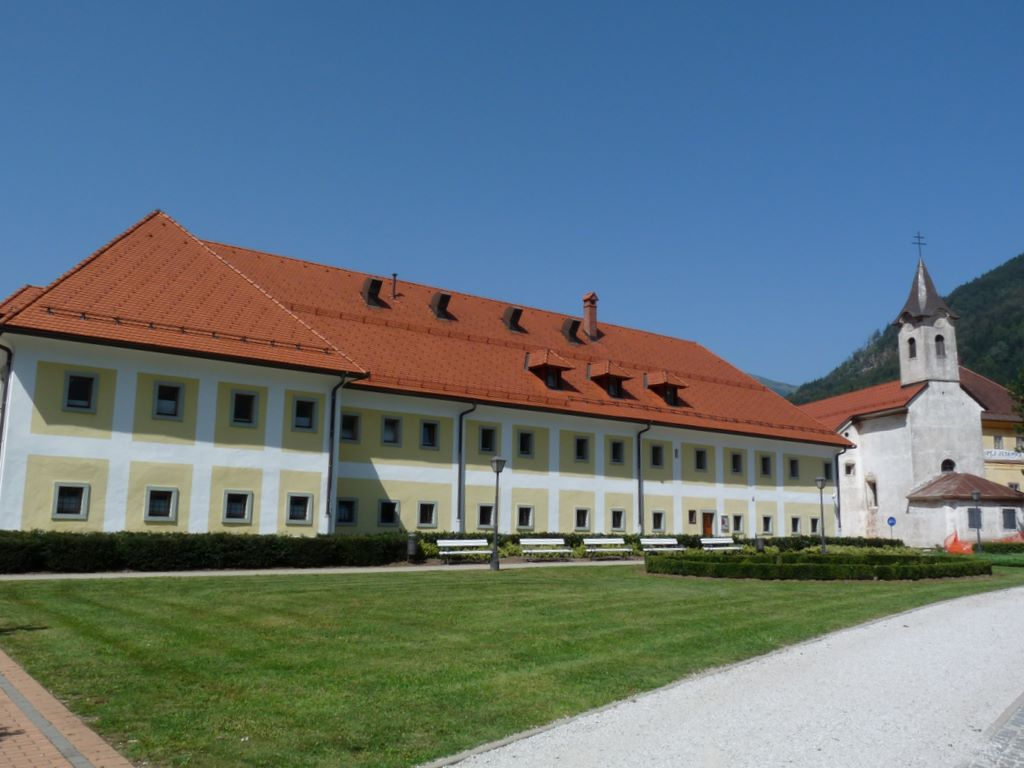
The Workers' Barracks

The Workers' Barracks (Slovene: Delavska kasarna) is a historic building at 48 France Prešeren Street (Cesta Franceta Prešerna) in the Stara Sava district of the town of Jesenice, northwestern Slovenia. Formerly a residential block, it now houses an ethnographic museum.

== History ==
The Workers' Barracks was built in the Late Baroque style at the end of the 18th century. It received its current name during the Napoleonic Wars, when it served as a barracks for the French soldiers. Afterwards, it reverted to the local ironworking industry and housed workers and their families. In 2005, the building was thoroughly renovated.

== Current usage ==
Operated by the Upper Sava Museum, its ethnographic collection includes a reconstructed workers’ flat from the 1930s and the 1940s, which presents the residential culture and the way of life of the Jesenice working class at that time. It hosts museum workshops aimed toward different age groups, a small photo gallery, the historic archives of the KID company, and the Jesenice Music School.
