= Golica =

Mountain in Austria and Slovenia

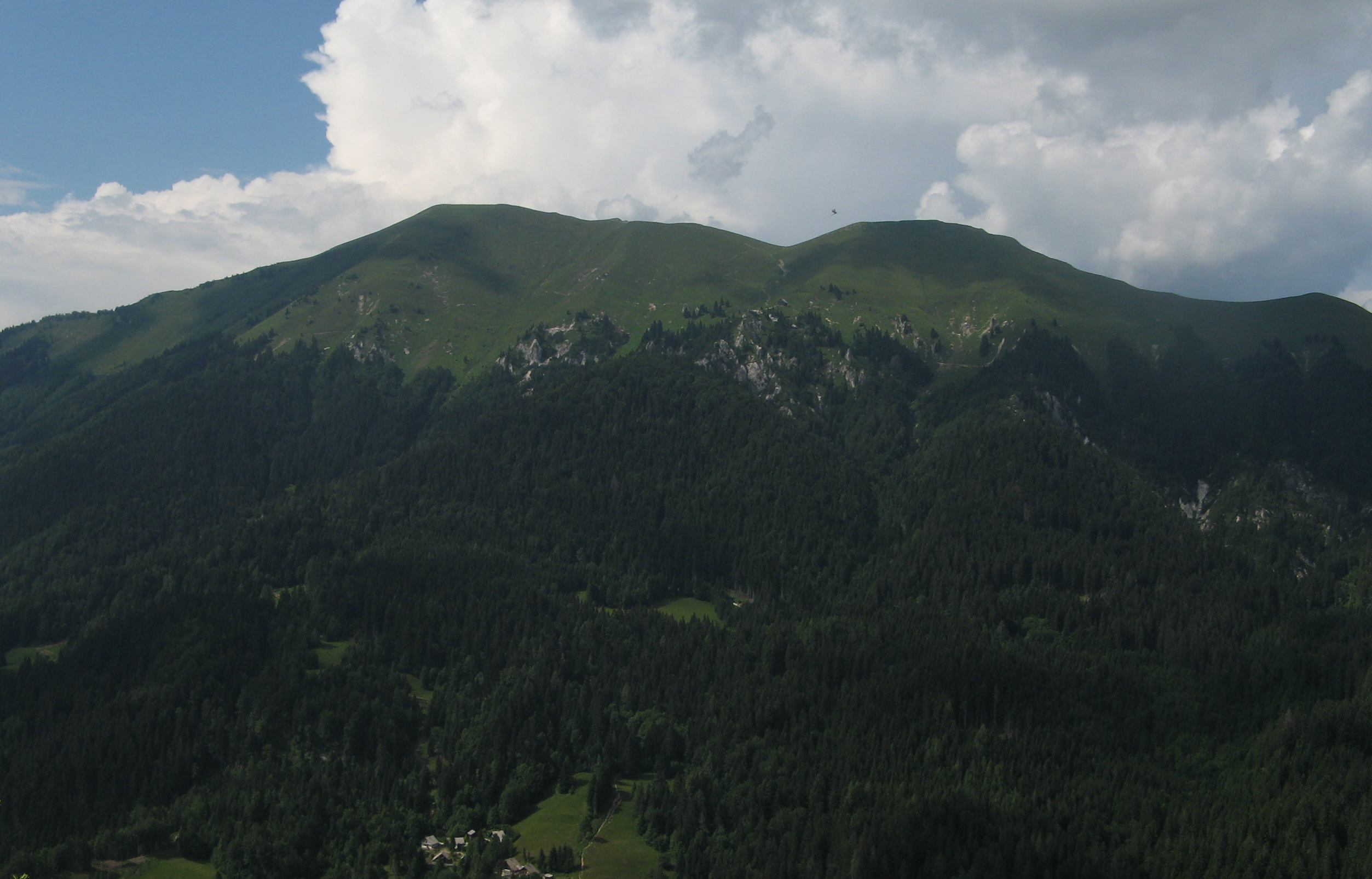
- Golica

Highest point
- Elevation: 1,835 m (6,020 ft)
- Coordinates: 46°29′24″N 14°03′01″E

Geography
- Location within Austria
- Location: Slovenia - Austria
- Parent range: Karawanks

Golica (1835 m) (German: Kahlkogel) is a peak in the Western Karawanks, on the border between Slovenia and Austria, above the Slovene town of Jesenice. It is known mainly for its fields of wild white narcissi, swathes of which cover Golica and surrounding pastures in late April and early May. This marks the beginning of a popular time for mountaineers to visit, extending through the end of summer. The slopes provide great views of the Julian Alps and Austrian Carinthia; the Ljubljana Basin can be seen from the summit on clear days.

Golica also gained considerable fame as the subject of the 1955 Slavko Avsenik polka Na Golici (On Golica), the Avsenik Ensemble's most popular song. Despite having given the song this title, Avsenik was never in his life on Golica.

250 m below the summit, there is a mountain hut at an altitude of 1582 m, with 40 sleeping berths. The original hut on this site - as well as a second hut at the summit itself - were burnt down during the Second World War by partisans to prevent their use by German soldiers. The hut at the summit was never rebuilt.

The slopes of Golica are today used as pastures for sheep, but until 1957 locals from settlements at its foot would clear the entire slope of grass for hay (a possible etymology of the name, which derives from the adjective "gol-," or "bare.").

The best way to reach the peak is from Jesenice via the mountain village of Planina pod Golico, which bears the peak's name.

== Gallery ==
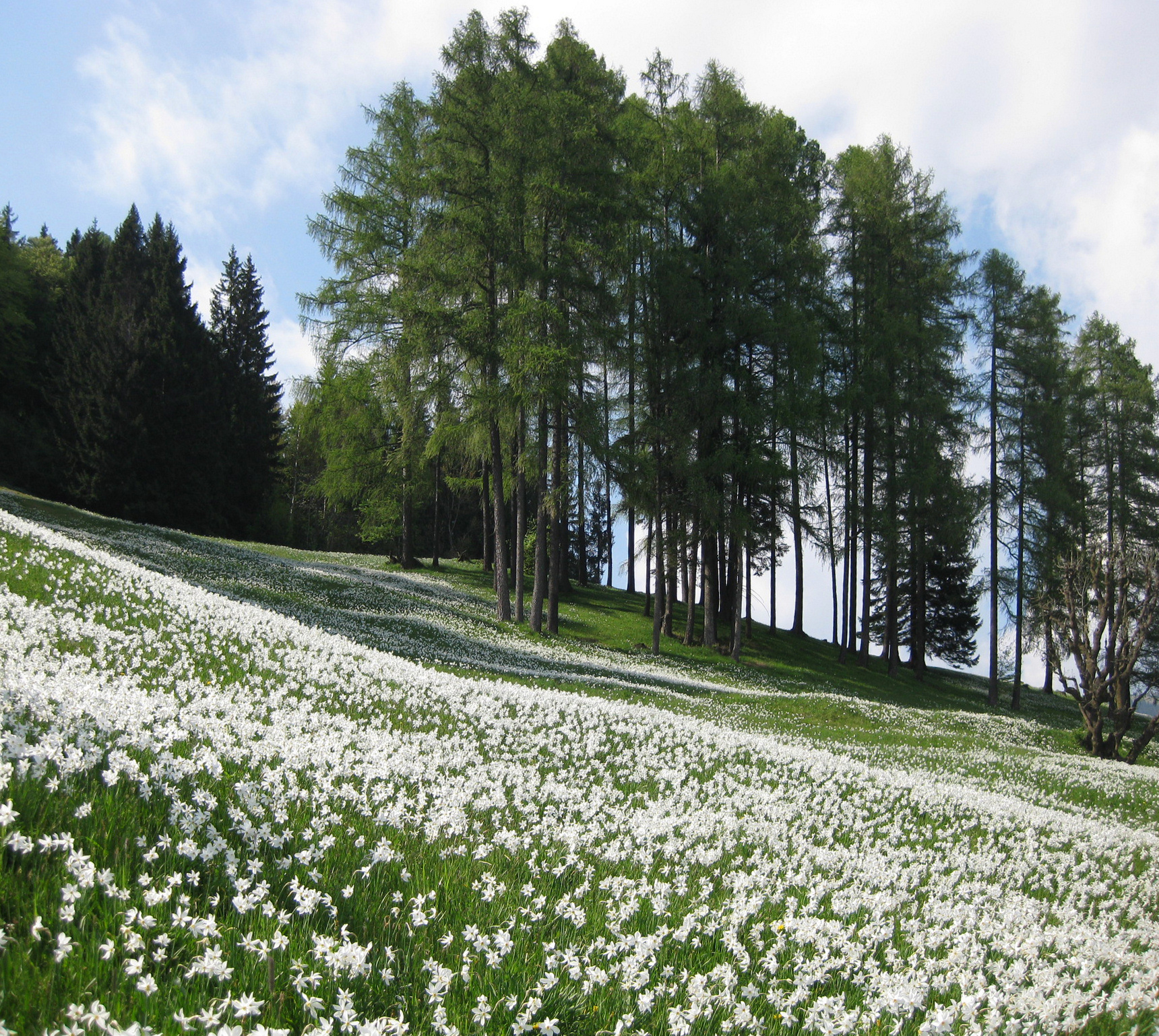
Narcissi fields under Golica

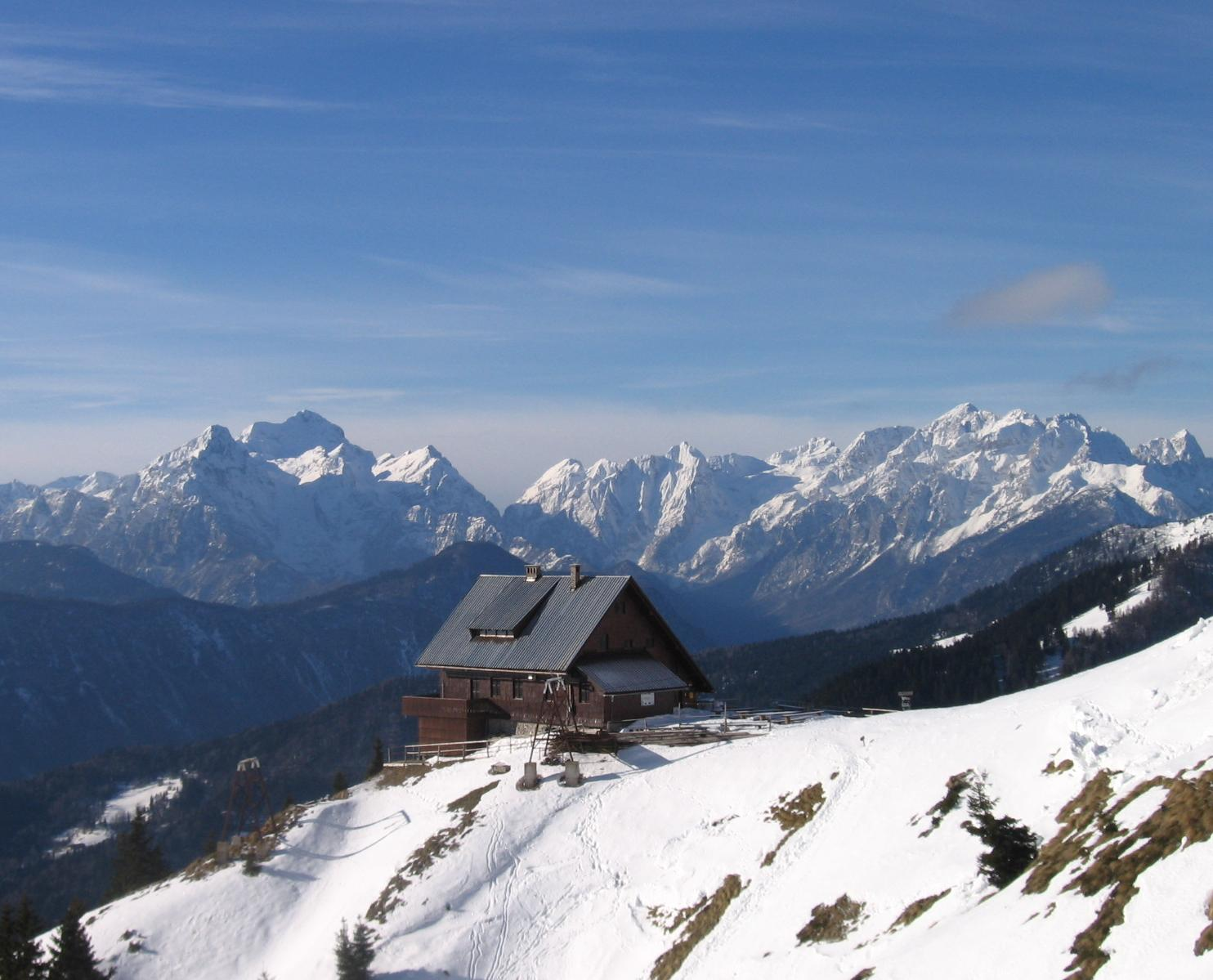
Golica mountain hut

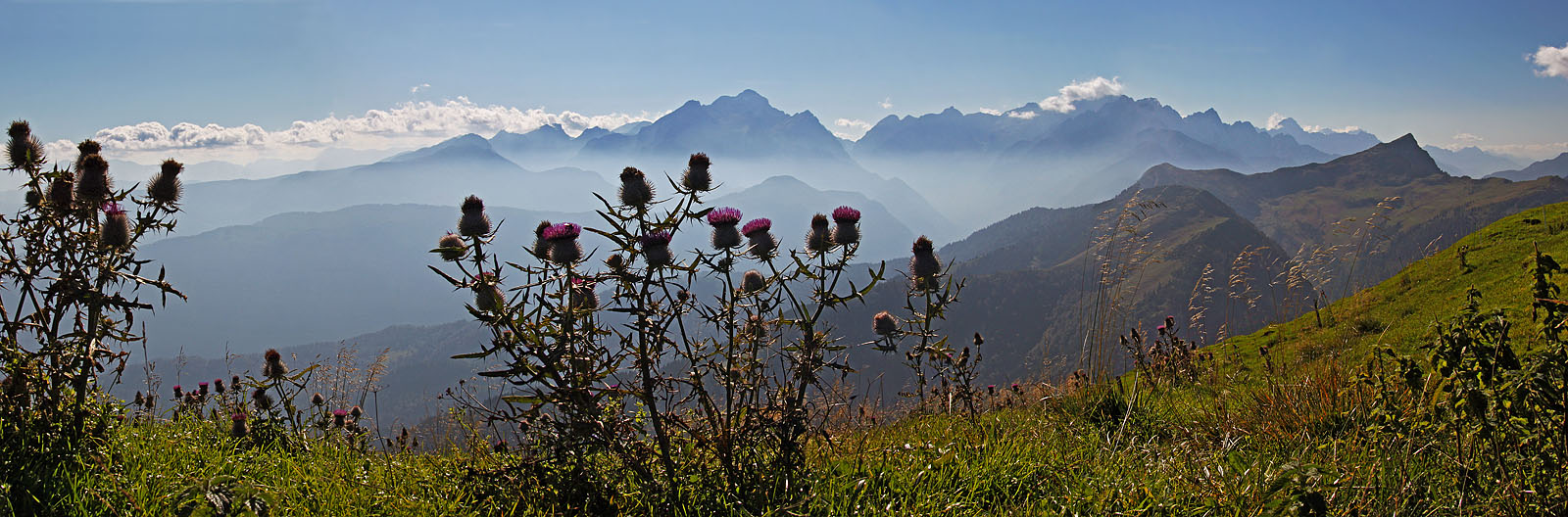
Julian Alps from Golica
