= Slovenski Javornik =

- Location in Slovenia
- Coordinates: 46°25′40″N 14°4′50″E
- Country: Slovenia
- Traditional region: Upper Carniola
- Statistical region: Upper Carniola
- Municipality: Jesenice
- Elevation: 536 m (1,759 ft)

Population (2002)
  - Total: 1,907

Slovenski Javornik (pronounced [slɔˈʋeːnski ˈjaːʋɔɾnik], German: Jauerburg) is a settlement in the Municipality of Jesenice in the Upper Carniola region of Slovenia.

The settlement is located southeast of the core of Jesenice, on the north bank of the Sava. Its neighbor to the east is the village of Koroška Bela, with which Javornik splits the bulk of Jesenice's remaining steel industry, and with which it is joined in a sub-municipal unit. To the north, the small settlement of Javorniški Rovt lies directly above Javornik on the lower slopes of the Karawanks.

Places of note include the Acroni steel mill complex, the Podkočna Bridge over the Sava, a small hydroelectric plant on the Sava at Borovlje, and a train station on the Jesenice-Ljubljana line.

== Name ==
Commonly (and historically) known simply as Javornik, the placename is derived from the Slovene word javor 'maple'; the adjective slovenski 'Slovenian' was added during the 1920s to prevent confusion with several other settlements of the same name in the newly formed Kingdom of Yugoslavia. The archaic German name Jauerburg is derived from the Slovene one.

== History ==
Javornik was founded in 1403, when Ulrich, the bishop of Brixen, granted Herman Esel the rights to mine iron ore below Koroška Bela. Esel established blast furnaces on the right bank of Javornik Creek, below Kres Hill. Javornik was the third iron-working settlement in the modern Jesenice area, after Sava and Plavž, although all were predated by the agricultural villages of Koroška Bela and Murova.

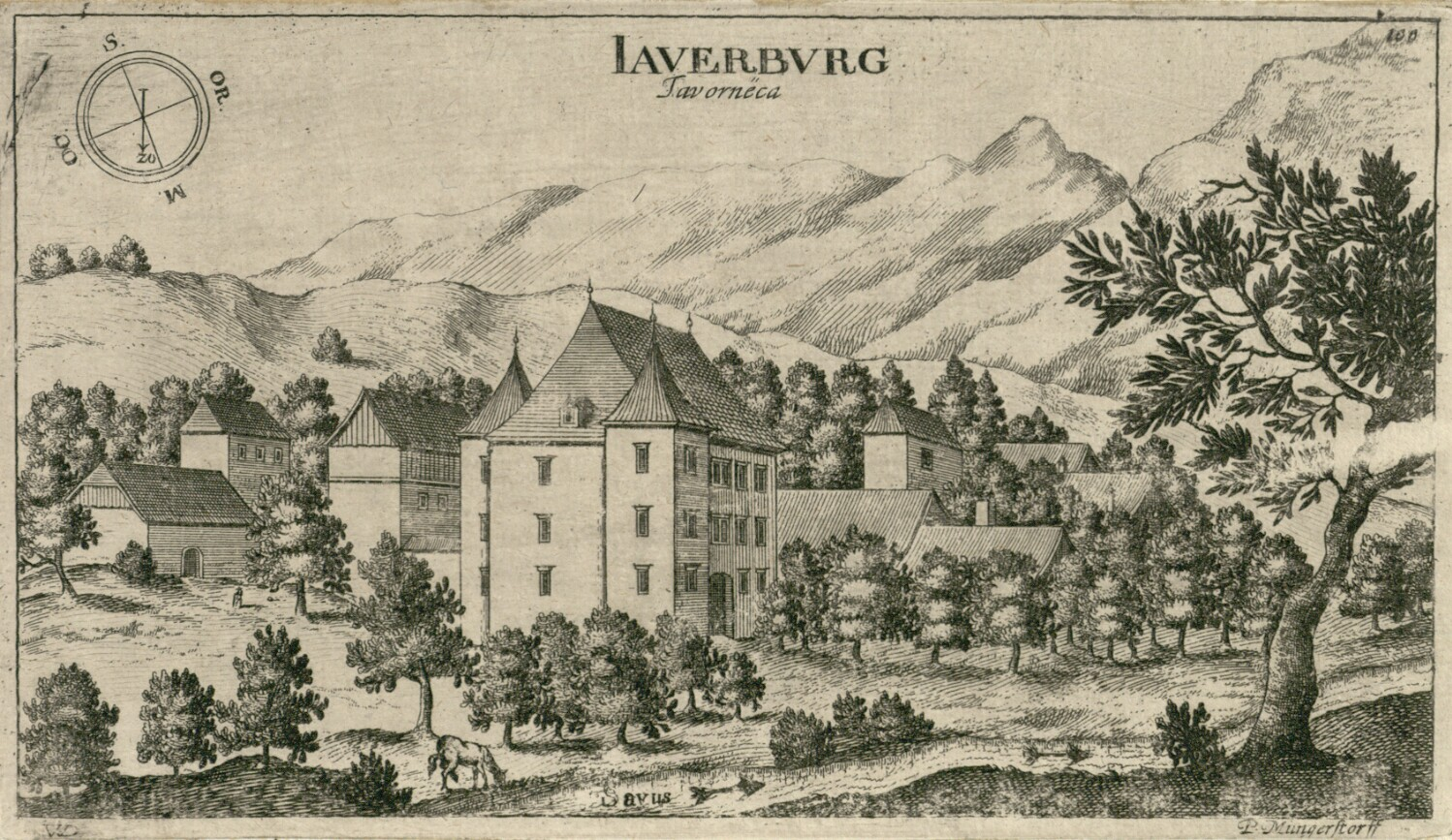
Javornik Castle in The Glory of the Duchy of Carniola

The industrial facilities passed through the hands of several owners, including the Pasarelli family, who built a manorhouse at Trebež in 1633, and were styled "von Iaverburg" after attaining the rank of edler. The manor (depicted in The Glory of the Duchy of Carniola, 1689), was one of four "ironworks castles" built in the area during the 16th and early 17th centuries, of which the Kos Manor in Murova and the Bucelleni-Ruard Manor in Sava survive.

In 1752, the Javornik furnaces and other facilities in the area were purchased by the Tarvisio merchant and investor Michel Angel Zois de Edelstein. His son, the Slovene Enlightenment patron Baron Sigismund Zois, resided at the manor while supervising the family's bloomery furnaces, in which ferromanganese was first produced in 1872. Zois also hosted prominent local intellectuals, including the playwright Anton Tomaž Linhart, whose comedy The Merry Day or Matiček's Wedding (the first Slovene-language play) may have been originally staged there. Zois's brother, the botanist Karel Zois, also spent a significant amount of time in Javornik, which served as a base for his investigations of the flora of the Karawanks.

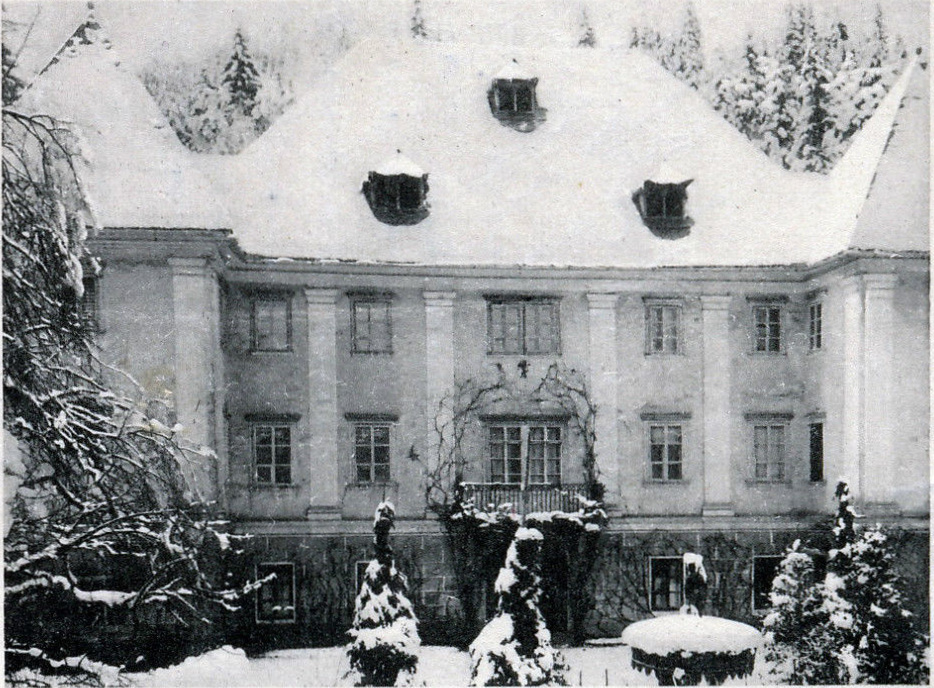
Javornik Manor in 1918

The manor was renovated in 1838, with a second corner tower added to symmetrize the facade. Due to Zois's descendants' poor management, the estate and ironworks were repossessed by creditors in 1869, forming the Carniolan Industrial Company (Kranjska industrijska družba, KID). The manor became the company's seat.

After the railroad from Ljubljana to Tarvisio was laid through Jesenice in 1870, KID—by then the sole operator of the mill—began consolidating its scattered plants to Sava and Javornik. In 1904, the sheet-metal rolling plant was transferred from Jesenice to Javornik; a decade later, during World War I, the plant and its workers were moved to Trieste and Pula to work on the Austro-Hungarian Navy.

In 1929, Javornik was among the settlements amalgamated into the town of Jesenice. The same year, the Javornik facilities were purchased by the Westen brothers, August (1877–1952) and Adolf (1878–1960), who built a new light sheet-metal rolling plant near the manor in 1933. A new workers' settlement, physically and historically distinct from the original village, began to form on the agricultural land of Borovlje, to the south of the original Javornik core of Trebež.

Following World War II, the new authorities launched a plan to rebuild the Jesenice ironworks (which had been largely destroyed in an Allied air raid in 1945) on a much larger scale. The massive expansion would require a vast amount of land, and much of Sava and Trebež were slated for demolition. The manor chapel was torn down immediately after the war, with the rest of the village following in the early 1950s. The manor itself, which had been converted into workers' housing, was razed in 1959. Simultaneously, a new Javornik took shape among the interwar workers' barracks, which were also torn down and replaced with multistory apartment blocks. Very little of pre-1950 Javornik survives; the Mulej House, a prominent public building dating from the late 18th century, was demolished due to structural instability in 2002.

In 2021, the Department of Archaeology at the University of Ljubljana took advantage of the construction of a new Acroni access road to conduct excavations around the former site of the Mulej House.
