= Plavž (Jesenice) =

- Location in Slovenia
- Coordinates: 46°26′34″N 14°02′07″E
- Country: Slovenia
- Traditional region: Upper Carniola
- Statistical region: Upper Carniola
- Municipality: Jesenice

Plavž (pronounced [ˈplaːu̯ʃ]) is part of the town of Jesenice in the Upper Carniola region of Slovenia. Formerly, it was an autonomous settlement. The name Plavž means 'blast furnace' in Slovene.

== History ==
The settlement developed in the late 16th century, when the ironworks then located in the Planina pod Golico area were moved here by the Bucelleni family. The Bucellenis built new blast furnaces in 1584, a mansion house, and (in 1617) a church dedicated to St. Barbara.

In 1774 the blast furnaces in the area were abandoned and the mansion house pulled down. The area reverted to agricultural land until the 1950s, when it was developed as the main residential area of Jesenice during the industrial expansion of the Jesenice ironworks after the Second World War, particularly in the 1970s, when rows of high-rise blocks of flats were built.

The northern section of Plavž is also the location of Jesenice General Hospital, the town's largest primary school (Jesenice Tone Čufar Primary School) and a commercial industrial area adjacent to the railroad tracks.
