= Planina pod Golico =

Planina pod Golico Sveti Križ (before 1955)
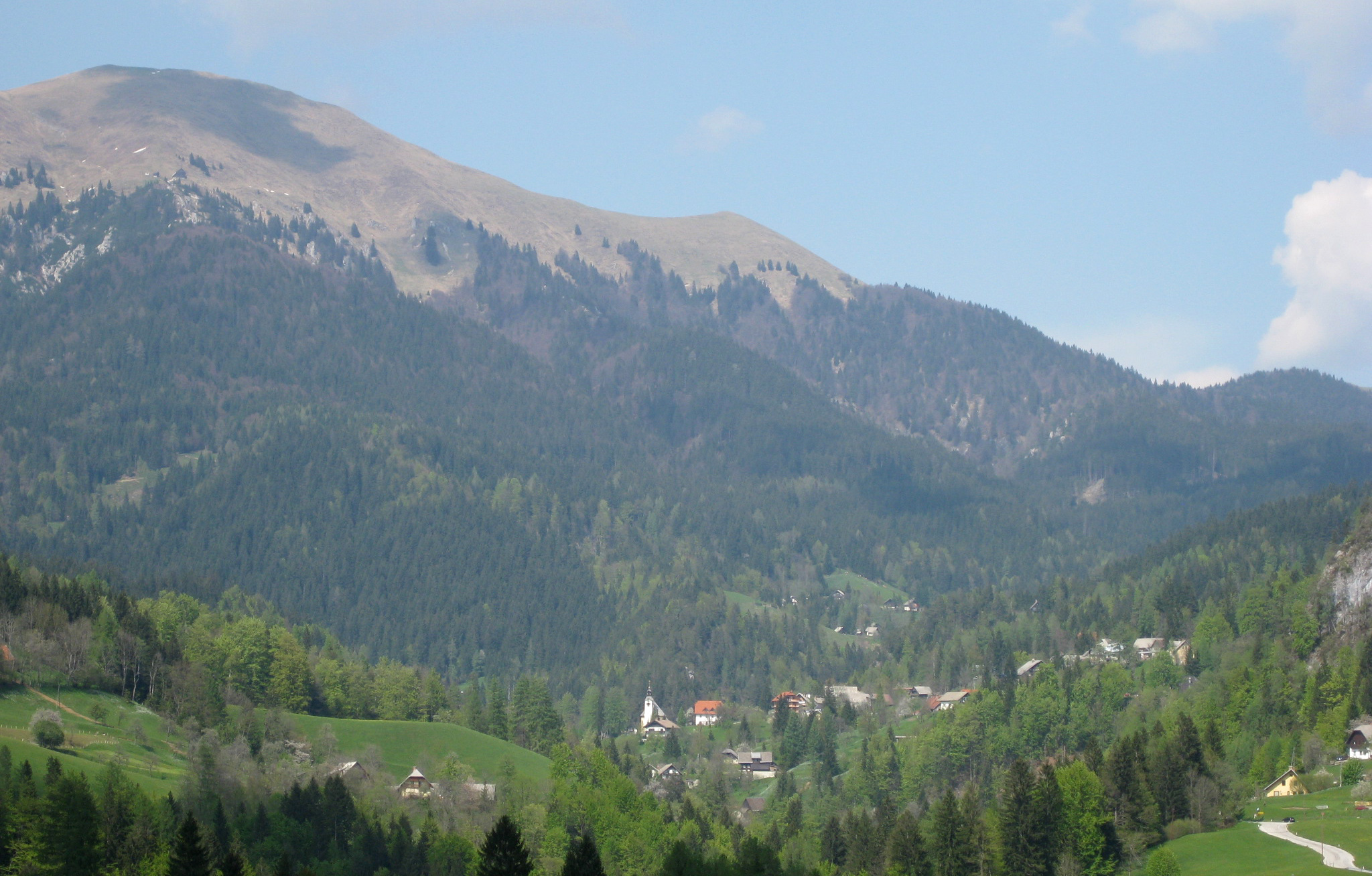

- Location in Slovenia
- Coordinates: 46°27′24″N 14°3′11″E
- Country: Slovenia
- Traditional region: Upper Carniola
- Statistical region: Upper Carniola
- Municipality: Jesenice
- Elevation: 954 m (3,130 ft)

Population (2002)
  - Total: 598

Planina pod Golico (pronounced [plaˈnìːna pɔd ɡɔˈlíːtsɔ]; German: Alpen) is a mountain village in the Municipality of Jesenice, in the Upper Carniola region of Slovenia. It lies on the southern foot of Mount Golica in the Karawanks range, at an elevation of 954 metres (3,130 ft).

== Climate ==
Climate data for Planina pod Golico, 1991–2020 normals, extremes 1951–2020
Month	Jan	Feb	Mar	Apr	May	Jun	Jul	Aug	Sep	Oct	Nov	Dec	Year
Record high °C (°F)	15.5 (59.9)	17.8 (64.0)	20.3 (68.5)	24.6 (76.3)	28 (82)	32.3 (90.1)	33.5 (92.3)	33.1 (91.6)	27.2 (81.0)	23 (73)	21.2 (70.2)	15.2 (59.4)	33.5 (92.3)
Mean daily maximum °C (°F)	2.3 (36.1)	3.7 (38.7)	7.6 (45.7)	12.3 (54.1)	17.1 (62.8)	21.0 (69.8)	23.1 (73.6)	22.8 (73.0)	17.6 (63.7)	12.6 (54.7)	7.0 (44.6)	2.9 (37.2)	12.5 (54.5)
Daily mean °C (°F)	−1.6 (29.1)	−1 (30)	2.1 (35.8)	6.2 (43.2)	10.9 (51.6)	14.5 (58.1)	16.2 (61.2)	16.0 (60.8)	11.7 (53.1)	7.5 (45.5)	3.1 (37.6)	−0.8 (30.6)	7.1 (44.7)
Mean daily minimum °C (°F)	−4.5 (23.9)	−4.1 (24.6)	−1.3 (29.7)	2.3 (36.1)	6.5 (43.7)	10.1 (50.2)	11.8 (53.2)	12.0 (53.6)	8.2 (46.8)	4.4 (39.9)	0.7 (33.3)	−3.4 (25.9)	3.6 (38.4)
Record low °C (°F)	−21.5 (−6.7)	−22 (−8)	−18.7 (−1.7)	−9.4 (15.1)	−6.2 (20.8)	−0.5 (31.1)	1.4 (34.5)	1.8 (35.2)	−1.4 (29.5)	−7.5 (18.5)	−13.2 (8.2)	−17.4 (0.7)	−22 (−8)
Average precipitation mm (inches)	78 (3.1)	94 (3.7)	112 (4.4)	138 (5.4)	159 (6.3)	161 (6.3)	166 (6.5)	159 (6.3)	207 (8.1)	203 (8.0)	213 (8.4)	145 (5.7)	1,835 (72.2)
Average snowfall cm (inches)	38 (15)	55 (22)	39 (15)	17 (6.7)	1 (0.4)	0 (0)	0 (0)	0 (0)	0 (0)	3 (1.2)	21 (8.3)	47 (19)	221 (87.6)
Average extreme snow depth cm (inches)	21 (8.3)	32 (13)	23 (9.1)	3 (1.2)	0 (0)	0 (0)	0 (0)	0 (0)	0 (0)	0.3 (0.1)	2 (0.8)	15 (5.9)	32 (13)
Average precipitation days (≥ 0.1 mm)	10	10	11	14	16	15	15	14	13	12	13	11	154
Average snowy days (≥ 1 cm)	6	6	5	2	0.2	0	0	0	0	1	3	6	29.2
Source: Slovenian Environment Agency (ARSO)

== Name ==
The settlement was officially known as Planina in the 19th century, but by the 20th century the name Sveti Križ nad Jesenicami (literally, 'Holy Cross above Jesenice') was also used. The name of the settlement was changed from Sveti Križ to Planina pod Golico (literally, 'pasture below Golica') in 1955. The name was changed on the basis of the 1948 Law on Names of Settlements and Designations of Squares, Streets, and Buildings as part of efforts by Slovenia's postwar communist government to remove religious elements from toponyms.

== History ==
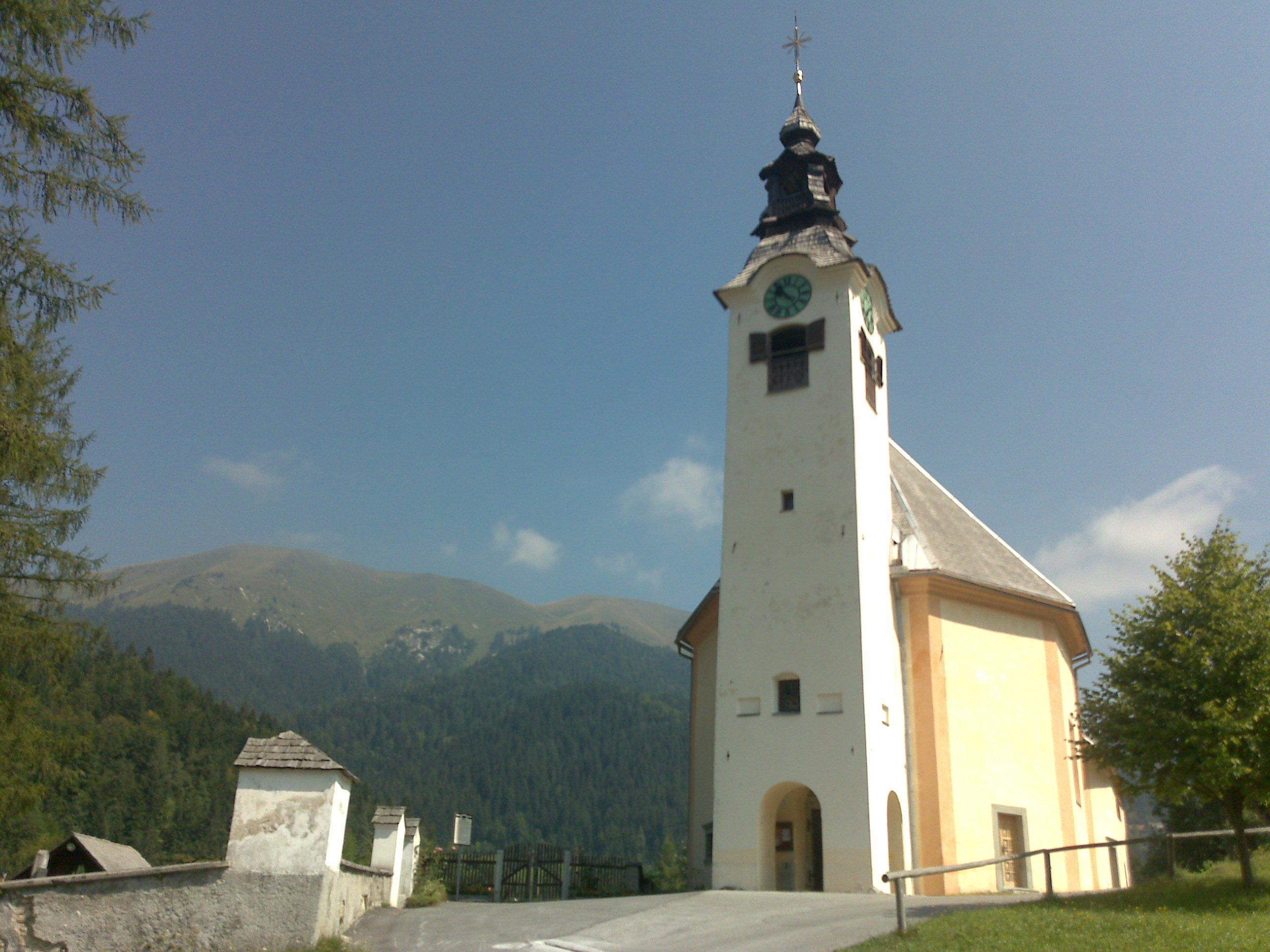
Holy Cross Church

The settlement was originally linked to ironworks. In the 14th century smelting ovens operated in the Carniolan village, and the beginnings of mining are documented in an Ortenburg mining order dating to 1381 that mentions mining and blast furnace operations at Sveti Križ. A copy of this document is exhibited in the Museum of the History of Steel Production in Jesenice.

After the 15th century, the ironworks were moved further down into the valley, closer to a greater source of water needed for the process, and Jesenice became the main industrial and administrative centre. Iron ore was still mined close to the village in the Sava Caves (Slovene: Savske jame) area until the early 20th century.

== Church ==
Exaltation of the Holy Cross Church (cerkev Povišanja sv. Križa) is a parish church that was built in the late 17th century (1683) by the Bucelleni family, the Italian owners of mines in the surrounding area. The village nucleus developed around it; the settlement also derived its older name of Sveti Križ from the church.

== Other heritage ==
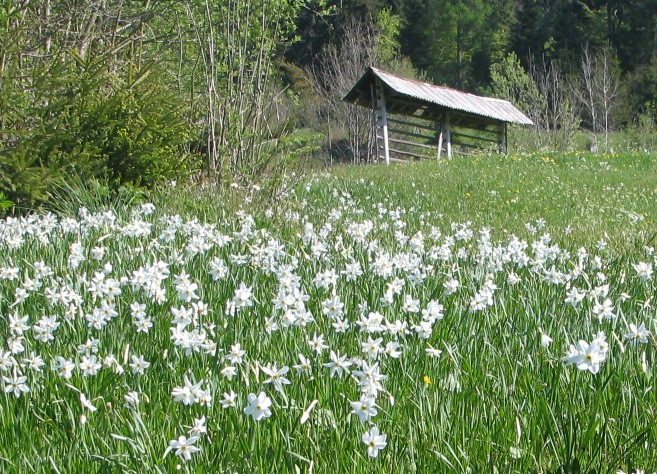
Field of narcissus near Planina pod Golico

Today the village is known as a starting point for hiking routes to nearby scenic peaks such as Golica and Rožca, and especially for the wild white narcissus that flower in mountain pastures around the village from late April to early May. The plants have been protected by law since 1949 and picking them is strictly forbidden. A narcissus festival is held by the local tourist association in May. The chairlift for the Španov vrh ski slope also begins in Planina pod Golico. There is also a natural luge track beyond the village in the Sava Caves area and competitions are held by the Jesenice Luge Club here every winter.
