= Podkoren 3 =

Ski trail in Slovenia

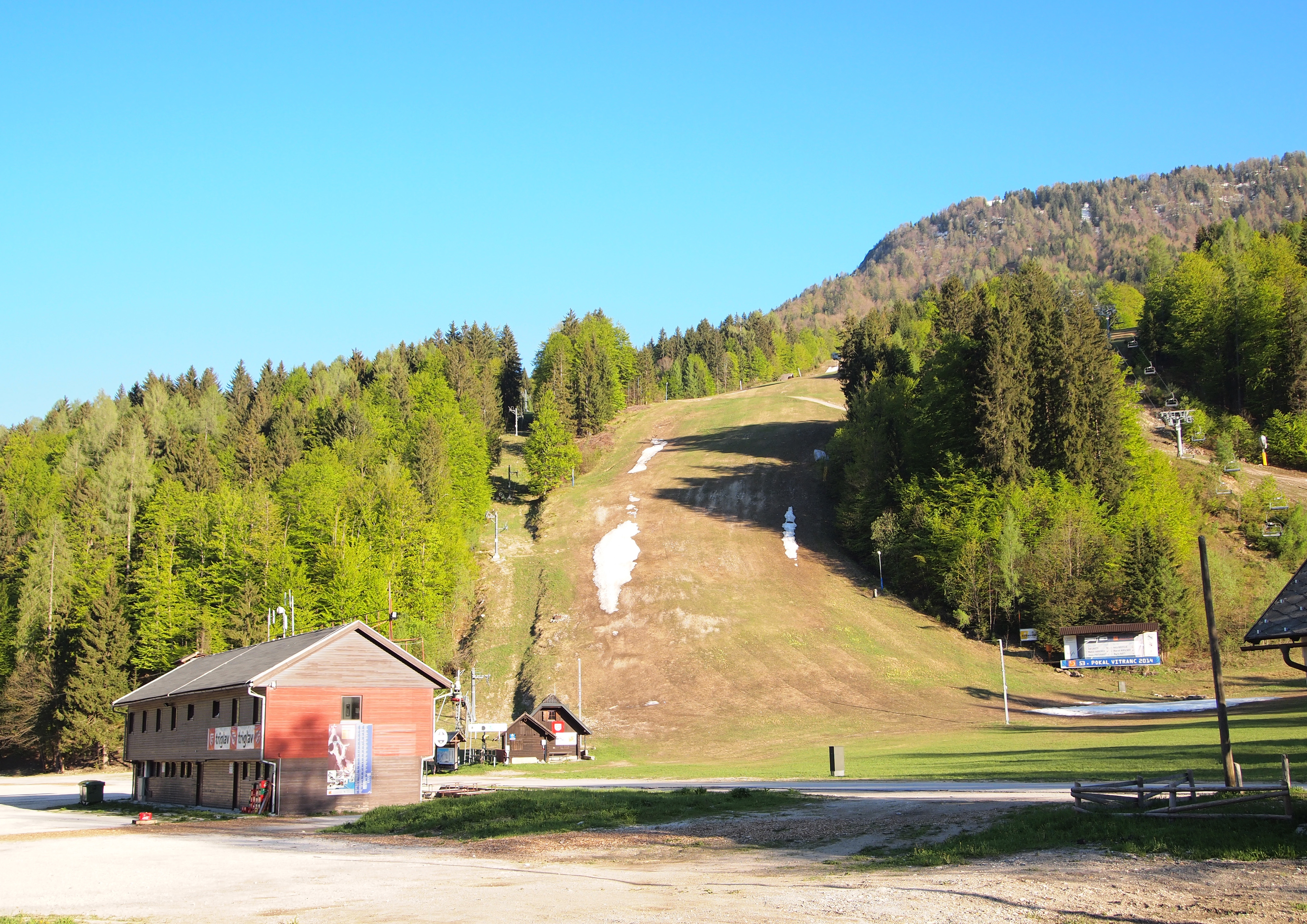
- Interactive map of Podkoren 3
- Location within Slovenia Location within Alps Location within Europe
- 46°29′20″N 13°45′23″E
- Location: Podkoren, Kranjska Gora, Slovenia
- Mountain: Vitranc
- Opened: 1 December 1993 (L); 2 December 1983 (M)
- Architect: Peter Lakota (SLO)
- Member: Club5+
- Level: advanced
- Competition: Vitranc Cup

Giant slalom
- Start: 1,278 m (4,193 ft) (AA)
- Finish: 836 m (2,743 ft)
- Vertical drop: 442 m (1,450 ft)
- Max incline: 30.5 degrees (59%)
- Min incline: 10.2 degrees (18%)
- Most Wins (M): (United States) Ted Ligety (6)
- Most Wins (W): (Italy) Marta Bassino (2)

Slalom
- Start: 1,035 m (3,396 ft) (AA)
- Finish: 836 m (2,743 ft)
- Vertical drop: 199 m (653 ft)
- Max incline: 25.2 degrees (47%)
- Min incline: 11.9 degrees (21%)
- Most Wins (M): (Italy) Alberto Tomba (3)

Podkoren 3 is a black World Cup technical ski course in Slovenia, located on Vitranc mountain in Podkoren, Kranjska Gora. When it debuted over 42 years ago in December 1983, it was in Yugoslavia, and was constructed by Peter Lakota, a successful Slovenian ski racer.

It has been hosting slalom and giant slalom for the Vitranc Cup (Pokal Vitranc) since then. It replaced previous slopes; Bukovniški smuk (1961–70) and old gas station slope (1971–83).

With a 59% incline at the start of giant slalom, it is the ski slope with the steepest part in Slovenia. It is located close to Planica and Rateče (near the Italian and Austrian borders).

This slope is considered one of the top three hardest giant slaloms in the world, along with Alta Badia (ITA) and Adelboden (SUI).

The slope is part of "Podkoren I" section, one of four, right in the middle of Kranjska Gora Ski Resort.

== History ==
In December 1983, this course was officially opened with women's and men's slalom (20,000 people), replacing the old previous course above the nearby gas station.

In 1985, a total of 40,000 people has gathered in two days. 30,000 alone at the slalom where Rok Petrovič won in front of a home crowd, one of the most iconic and most visited and events in Kranjska Gora.

In 1986, a total of 20,000 people saw another home win for the second year in a row, with Bojan Križaj and Rok Petrovič being first and second in SL. Swiss athlete Joël Gaspoz won the giant slalom a day before, for the third year in Kranjska Gora a row.

== World Cup ==
(Italy) Alberto Tomba	(United States) Ted Ligety
Won record 3 slaloms	Won record 6 giant slaloms

=== Men ===
Vitranc Cup held since 2 December 1983 on this course which hosted a total of 77 World Cup events for men (6th of all-time).

Edition	Season	Date	Event	Winner	Second	Third
↓ Vitranc Cup ↓
23rd	1983/84	2 December 1983	SL	(Liechtenstein) Andreas Wenzel	(Bulgaria) Petar Popangelov	(Liechtenstein) Paul Frommelt
24th	1984/85	15 February 1985	GS	(Switzerland) Thomas Bürgler	(Switzerland) Pirmin Zurbriggen	(Luxembourg) Marc Girardelli
24th	1984/85	16 February 1985	SL	(Luxembourg) Marc Girardelli	(Sweden) Ingemar Stenmark	(Liechtenstein) Paul Frommelt (Sweden) Jonas Nilsson
25th	1985/86	20 December 1985	GS	(Switzerland) Joël Gaspoz	(Italy) Roberto Erlacher	(Austria) Hubert Strolz
25th	1985/86	21 December 1985	SL	(Socialist Federal Republic of Yugoslavia) Rok Petrovič	(Sweden) Jonas Nilsson	(Austria) Thomas Stangassinger
26th	1986/87	19 December 1986	GS	(Switzerland) Joël Gaspoz	(Italy) Roberto Erlacher	(Italy) Richard Pramotton
26th	1986/87	20 December 1986	SL	(Socialist Federal Republic of Yugoslavia) Bojan Križaj	(Socialist Federal Republic of Yugoslavia) Rok Petrović	(Sweden) Ingemar Stenmark
REP	1986/87	3 January 1987	GS	(Switzerland) Joël Gaspoz	(Austria) Hubert Strolz	(West Germany) Markus Wasmeier
27th	1987/88	19 December 1987	GS	(Austria) Helmut Mayer	(Switzerland) Pirmin Zurbriggen	(Austria) Hubert Strolz
27th	1987/88	20 December 1987	SL	(Italy) Alberto Tomba	(Italy) Richard Pramotton	(Austria) Günther Mader
28th	1988/89	17 December 1988	SL	(Luxembourg) Marc Girardelli	(West Germany) Armin Bittner	(Italy) Alberto Tomba
REP	1989/90	6 January 1990	SL	(Sweden) Jonas Nilsson	(Austria) Hubert Strolz	(Austria) Michael Tritscher
29th	1989/90	6 January 1990	GS	cancelled and later replaced at La Villa (14 January)		
29th	1989/90	7 January 1990	SL	(West Germany) Armin Bittner	(Austria) Bernhard Gstrein	(Switzerland) Paul Accola
30th	1990/91	21 December 1990	GS	(Italy) Alberto Tomba	(Switzerland) Urs Kälin	(Luxembourg) Marc Girardelli
30th	1990/91	22 December 1990	SL	(Norway) Ole Kristian Furuseth	(Sweden) Thomas Fogdö	(Austria) Thomas Stangassinger
31st	1991/92	4 January 1992	GS	(Italy) Sergio Bergamelli	(Switzerland) Hans Pieren	(Italy) Alberto Tomba
31st	1991/92	5 January 1992	SL	(Italy) Alberto Tomba	(Germany) Armin Bittner	(Norway) Finn Christian Jagge
32nd	1992/93	19 December 1992	SL	(Sweden) Thomas Fogdö	(Italy) Alberto Tomba	(Germany) Peter Roth
32nd	1992/93	20 December 1992	GS	(Luxembourg) Marc Girardelli	(Norway) Lasse Kjus	(Sweden) Fredrik Nyberg
33rd	1993/94	8 January 1994	GS	(Sweden) Fredrik Nyberg	(Italy) Matteo Belfrond	(Germany) Tobias Barnerssoi
33rd	1993/94	9 January 1994	SL	(Norway) Finn Christian Jagge	(Norway) Ole Kristian Furuseth	(Sweden) Thomas Fogdö
34th	1994/95	6 January 1995	GS	(Italy) Alberto Tomba	(Slovenia) Mitja Kunc (Norway) Harald Strand Nilsen	
35th	1995/96	21 December 1995	GS	(Norway) Lasse Kjus	(Switzerland) Michael von Grünigen	(Austria) Mario Reiter
35th	1995/96	22 December 1995	SL	(Italy) Alberto Tomba	(Slovenia) Jure Košir	(France) Sébastien Amiez
36th	1996/97	5 January 1997	GS	(Switzerland) Michael von Grünigen	(Austria) Siegfried Voglreiter	(Norway) Kjetil André Aamodt
36th	1996/97	6 January 1997	SL	(Austria) Thomas Sykora	(France) Sébastien Amiez	(Austria) Thomas Stangassinger
37th	1997/98	3 January 1998	GS	(Austria) Christian Mayer	(Austria) Hermann Maier	(Switzerland) Michael von Grünigen
37th	1997/98	4 January 1998	SL	(Austria) Thomas Sykora	(France) Pierrick Bourgeat	(Austria) Thomas Stangassinger
38th	1998/99	5 January 1999	GS	(Italy) Patrick Holzer	(Austria) Christian Mayer	(Austria) Hans Knauß
38th	1998/99	6 January 1999	SL	(Slovenia) Jure Košir	(Austria) Thomas Stangassinger	(Austria) Benjamin Raich
39th	1999/00	21 December 1999	SL	(Switzerland) Didier Plaschy	(Austria) Benjamin Raich	(Austria) Thomas Stangassinger
REP	1999/00	8 March 2000	GS	(Austria) Christian Mayer	(France) Joël Chenal	(Liechtenstein) Marco Büchel
40th	2000/01	20 December 2000	GS	lack of snow; replaced in Bormio (21 December)		
40th	2000/01	21 December 2000	SL	lack of snow; replaced in Madonna di Campiglio (19 December)		
REP	2001/02	20 December 2001	GS	(Sweden) Fredrik Nyberg	(Austria) Benjamin Raich	(Slovenia) Uroš Pavlovčič
41st	2001/02	21 December 2001	GS	(Austria) Benjamin Raich	(United States) Bode Miller	(Switzerland) Didier Cuche
41st	2001/02	22 December 2001	SL	(France) Jean-Pierre Vidal	(Austria) Mario Matt	(Croatia) Ivica Kostelić
42nd	2002/03	4 January 2003	GS	(United States) Bode Miller	(Austria) Christian Mayer	(Finland) Sami Uotila
42nd	2002/03	5 January 2003	SL	(Croatia) Ivica Kostelić	(Austria) Rainer Schönfelder	(France) Jean-Pierre Vidal
43rd	2003/04	28 February 2004	GS	(United States) Bode Miller	(Italy) Alberto Schieppati	(Italy) Alexander Ploner
43rd	2003/04	29 February 2004	SL	(Norway) Truls Ove Karlsen	(Norway) Tom Stiansen	(Austria) Mario Matt
44th	2004/05	26 February 2005	GS	(Austria) Benjamin Raich	(Austria) Hermann Maier	(Finland) Kalle Palander
44th	2004/05	27 February 2005	SL	(Italy) Giorgio Rocca	(Sweden) André Myhrer	(Austria) Benjamin Raich
45th	2005/06	21 December 2005	GS	(Austria) Benjamin Raich	(Italy) Massimiliano Blardone	(Canada) Thomas Grandi
45th	2005/06	22 December 2005	SL	(Italy) Giorgio Rocca	(Canada) Thomas Grandi	(United States) Ted Ligety
46th	2006/07	3 March 2007	GS	(Austria) Benjamin Raich	(Canada) François Bourque	(Italy) Massimiliano Blardone
46th	2006/07	4 March 2007	SL	(Austria) Mario Matt	(Austria) Benjamin Raich	(Italy) Manfred Mölgg
47th	2007/08	8 March 2008	GS	(United States) Ted Ligety	(Italy) Manfred Mölgg	(Italy) Massimiliano Blardone
47th	2007/08	9 March 2008	SL	(Italy) Manfred Mölgg	(Croatia) Ivica Kostelić	(Austria) Marcel Hirscher
48th	2008/09	28 February 2009	GS	(United States) Ted Ligety	(Switzerland) Didier Cuche	(Italy) Massimiliano Blardone
48th	2008/09	1 March 2009	SL	(France) Julien Lizeroux	(Italy) Giuliano Razzoli	(Germany) Felix Neureuther
REP	2009/10	29 January 2010	GS	(United States) Ted Ligety	(Austria) Marcel Hirscher	(Norway) Kjetil Jansrud
49th	2009/10	30 January 2010	GS	(Austria) Marcel Hirscher	(Norway) Kjetil Jansrud	(United States) Ted Ligety
49th	2009/10	31 January 2010	SL	(Austria) Reinfried Herbst	(Austria) Marcel Hirscher	(France) Julien Lizeroux
50th	2010/11	5 March 2011	GS	(Switzerland) Beat Feuz	(Canada) Erik Guay	(Austria) Michael Walchhofer
50th	2010/11	6 March 2011	SL	(Austria) Mario Matt	(United States) Nolan Kasper (Sweden) Axel Bäck	
51st	2011/12	10 March 2012	GS	(United States) Ted Ligety	(France) Alexis Pinturault	(Austria) Marcel Hirscher
51st	2011/12	11 March 2012	SL	(Sweden) André Myhrer	(Italy) Cristian Deville	(France) Alexis Pinturault
52nd	2012/13	9 March 2013	GS	(United States) Ted Ligety	(Austria) Marcel Hirscher	(France) Alexis Pinturault
52nd	2012/13	10 March 2013	SL	(Croatia) Ivica Kostelić	(Austria) Marcel Hirscher	(Austria) Mario Matt
53rd	2013/14	8 March 2014	GS	(United States) Ted Ligety	(Austria) Benjamin Raich	(Norway) Henrik Kristoffersen
53rd	2013/14	9 March 2014	SL	(Germany) Felix Neureuther	(Germany) Fritz Dopfer	(Norway) Henrik Kristoffersen
54th	2014/15	14 March 2015	GS	(France) Alexis Pinturault	(Austria) Marcel Hirscher	(France) Thomas Fanara
54th	2014/15	15 March 2015	SL	(Norway) Henrik Kristoffersen	(Italy) Giuliano Razzoli	(Sweden) Mattias Hargin
REP	2015/16	4 March 2016	GS	(France) Alexis Pinturault	(Austria) Philipp Schörghofer	(Austria) Marcel Hirscher
55th	2015/16	5 March 2016	GS	(Austria) Marcel Hirscher	(France) Alexis Pinturault	(Norway) Henrik Kristoffersen
55th	2015/16	6 March 2016	SL	(Austria) Marcel Hirscher	(Norway) Henrik Kristoffersen	(Italy) Stefano Gross
56th	2016/17	4 March 2017	GS	(Austria) Marcel Hirscher	(Norway) Leif Kristian Haugen	(Sweden) Matts Olsson
56th	2016/17	5 March 2017	SL	(Austria) Michael Matt	(Italy) Stefano Gross	(Germany) Felix Neureuther
57th	2017/18	3 March 2018	GS	(Austria) Marcel Hirscher	(Norway) Henrik Kristoffersen	(France) Alexis Pinturault
57th	2017/18	4 March 2018	SL	(Austria) Marcel Hirscher	(Norway) Henrik Kristoffersen	(Switzerland) Ramon Zenhäusern
58th	2018/19	9 March 2019	GS	(Norway) Henrik Kristoffersen	(Norway) Rasmus Windingstad	(Switzerland) Marco Odermatt
58th	2018/19	10 March 2019	SL	(Switzerland) Ramon Zenhäusern	(Norway) Henrik Kristoffersen	(Austria) Marcel Hirscher
59th	2019/20	14 March 2020	GS	cancelled due to COVID-19 pandemic		
59th	2019/20	15 March 2020	SL	cancelled due to COVID-19 pandemic		
60th	2020/21	13 March 2021	GS	(Switzerland) Marco Odermatt	(Switzerland) Loïc Meillard	(Austria) Stefan Brennsteiner
60th	2020/21	14 March 2021	SL	(France) Clément Noël	(France) Victor Muffat-Jeandet	(Switzerland) Ramon Zenhäusern
61st	2021/22	12 March 2022	GS	(Norway) Henrik Kristoffersen	(Norway) Lucas Braathen (Switzerland) Marco Odermatt	
61st	2021/22	13 March 2022	GS	(Norway) Henrik Kristoffersen	(Austria) Stefan Brennsteiner	(Switzerland) Marco Odermatt
62nd	2022/23	11 March 2023	GS	(Switzerland) Marco Odermatt	(France) Alexis Pinturault	(Norway) Henrik Kristoffersen
62nd	2022/23	12 March 2023	GS	(Switzerland) Marco Odermatt	(Norway) Henrik Kristoffersen	(France) Alexis Pinturault
63rd	2023/24	9 March 2024	GS	cancelled due to rain and warm temperatures		
63rd	2023/24	10 March 2024	SL	cancelled due to rain and warm temperatures		
64th	2024/25	1 March 2025	GS	(Norway) Henrik Kristoffersen	(Brazil) Lucas Pinheiro Braathen	(Switzerland) Marco Odermatt
64th	2024/25	2 March 2025	SL	(Norway) Henrik Kristoffersen	(Norway) Timon Haugan	(Austria) Manuel Feller
65th	2025/26	7 March 2026	GS	(Brazil) Lucas Pinheiro Braathen	(Switzerland) Loïc Meillard	(Austria) Stefan Brennsteiner
65th	2025/26	8 March 2026	SL	(Norway) Atle Lie McGrath	(Norway) Henrik Kristoffersen	(Brazil) Lucas Pinheiro Braathen

MEN'S EVENTS IN YELLOW DID NOT COUNT FOR VITRANC CUP
Replacement for Borovets (1987), Madonna di Campiglio (1990), Adelboden (2000, 2010), Aspen (2001) and Ga-Pa (2016).

=== Women ===
On 1 December 1983, official opening with first ever event on this course held and the only "Vitranc Cup" event in women's history.

At the 60th edition (2024) Slovenian Ski Association (SZS) took over the organisation of Golden Fox from the original and long time organiser from Maribor ski club "SK Branik". In 2025 competition lost the right to name and promote the event under the well known brand of Golden Fox.

Edition	Season	Date	Event	Winner	Second	Third	Golden Fox winner
↓ Vitranc Cup ↓
1st	1983/84	1 December 1983	SL	(Switzerland) Erika Hess	(United States) Tamara McKinney	(Poland) Małgorzata Tlałka	—
↓ Golden Fox ↓
Replaced original venue from Maribor
25th	1987/88	30 January 1988	GS	(Socialist Federal Republic of Yugoslavia) Mateja Svet	(Switzerland) Vreni Schneider	(Spain) Blanca Fernández Ochoa (Austria) Anita Wachter	(Socialist Federal Republic of Yugoslavia) Mateja Svet
25th	1987/88	31 January 1988	SL	(Socialist Federal Republic of Yugoslavia) Mateja Svet	(Switzerland) Vreni Schneider (Austria) Roswitha Steiner		(Socialist Federal Republic of Yugoslavia) Mateja Svet
28th	1990/91	11 January 1991	GS	(Switzerland) Vreni Schneider	(Socialist Federal Republic of Yugoslavia) Nataša Bokal	(Austria) Petra Kronberger	(Switzerland) Vreni Schneider
28th	1990/91	12 January 1991	SL	(Socialist Federal Republic of Yugoslavia) Nataša Bokal	(Austria) Monika Maierhofer	(Socialist Federal Republic of Yugoslavia) Veronika Šarec	(Switzerland) Vreni Schneider
REP	1990/91	13 January 1991	SL	(Austria) Petra Kronberger	(Austria) Ingrid Salvenmoser	(Socialist Federal Republic of Yugoslavia) Veronika Šarec	—
43th	2006/07	6 January 2007	GS	(Austria) Nicole Hosp	(Italy) Nicole Gius	(Finland) Tanja Poutiainen	(Czech Republic) Šárka Záhrobská
43th	2006/07	7 January 2007	SL	(Austria) Marlies Schild	(Czech Republic) Šárka Záhrobská	(Slovakia) Veronika Zuzulová	(Czech Republic) Šárka Záhrobská
48th	2011/12	21 January 2012	GS	(France) Tessa Worley	(Italy) Federica Brignone	(Germany) Viktoria Rebensburg	(Finland) Tanja Poutiainen
48th	2011/12	22 January 2012	SL	(Austria) Michaela Kirchgasser	(Finland) Tanja Poutiainen	(Slovakia) Veronika Zuzulová	(Finland) Tanja Poutiainen
50th	2013/14	1 February 2014	GS	heavy snowfall and rain; replaced on 6 March 2014 in Åre			(Sweden) Frida Hansdotter
50th	2013/14	2 February 2014	SL	(Sweden) Frida Hansdotter	(Austria) Marlies Schild	(Austria) Bernadette Schild	(Sweden) Frida Hansdotter
54th	2017/18	6 January 2018	GS	(United States) Mikaela Shiffrin	(France) Tessa Worley	(Italy) Sofia Goggia	(United States) Mikaela Shiffrin
54th	2017/18	7 January 2018	SL	(United States) Mikaela Shiffrin	(Sweden) Frida Hansdotter	(Switzerland) Wendy Holdener	(United States) Mikaela Shiffrin
56th	2019/20	15 February 2020	GS	(New Zealand) Alice Robinson	(Slovakia) Petra Vlhová	(Switzerland) Wendy Holdener (Slovenia) Meta Hrovat	(Slovakia) Petra Vlhová
56th	2019/20	16 February 2020	SL	(Slovakia) Petra Vlhová	(Switzerland) Wendy Holdener	(Austria) Katharina Truppe	(Slovakia) Petra Vlhová
57th	2020/21	16 January 2021	GS	(Italy) Marta Bassino	(France) Tessa Worley	(Switzerland) Michelle Gisin	(Italy) Marta Bassino
57th	2020/21	17 January 2021	GS	(Italy) Marta Bassino	(Switzerland) Michelle Gisin	(Slovenia) Meta Hrovat	(Italy) Marta Bassino
58th	2021/22	8 January 2022	GS	(Sweden) Sara Hector	(France) Tessa Worley	(Italy) Marta Bassino	(Slovakia) Petra Vlhová
58th	2021/22	9 January 2022	SL	(Slovakia) Petra Vlhová	(Switzerland) Wendy Holdener	(Sweden) Anna Swenn-Larsson	(Slovakia) Petra Vlhová
59th	2022/23	7 January 2023	GS	(Canada) Valérie Grenier	(Italy) Marta Bassino	(Slovakia) Petra Vlhová	(Italy) Federica Brignone
59th	2022/23	8 January 2023	GS	(United States) Mikaela Shiffrin	(Italy) Federica Brignone	(Switzerland) Lara Gut-Behrami	(Italy) Federica Brignone
↓ Golden Fox ↓
Originally organised in Kranjska Gora
60th	2023/24	6 January 2024	GS	(Canada) Valérie Grenier	(Switzerland) Lara Gut-Behrami	(Italy) Federica Brignone	(Slovakia) Petra Vlhová
60th	2023/24	7 January 2024	SL	(Slovakia) Petra Vlhová	(Germany) Lena Dürr	(United States) AJ Hurt	(Slovakia) Petra Vlhová
↓ Kranjska Gora 2025 ↓
Originally organised in Kranjska Gora
61st	2024/25	4 January 2025	GS	(Sweden) Sara Hector	(Albania) Lara Colturi	(New Zealand) Alice Robinson	—
61st	2024/25	5 January 2025	SL	(Croatia) Zrinka Ljutić	(Switzerland) Wendy Holdener	(Sweden) Anna Swenn-Larsson	—
62nd	2025/26	3 January 2026	GS	(Switzerland) Camille Rast	(Austria) Julia Scheib	(United States) Paula Moltzan	—
62nd	2025/26	4 January 2026	SL	(Switzerland) Camille Rast	(United States) Mikaela Shiffrin	(Switzerland) Wendy Holdener	—

WOMEN'S EVENT IN YELLOW DID NOT COUNT FOR GOLDEN FOX
Replacement for Bergen (1991).

== Club5+ ==
In 1986, elite Club5 was originally founded by prestigious classic downhill organizers: Kitzbühel, Wengen, Garmisch, Val d’Isère and Val Gardena/Gröden, with goal to bring alpine ski sport on the highest levels possible.

Later over the years other classic longterm organizers joined the now named Club5+: Alta Badia, Cortina, Kranjska Gora, Maribor, Lake Louise, Schladming, Adelboden, Kvitfjell, St.Moritz and Åre.
