= Nadiža (stream) =

Stream in Slovenia

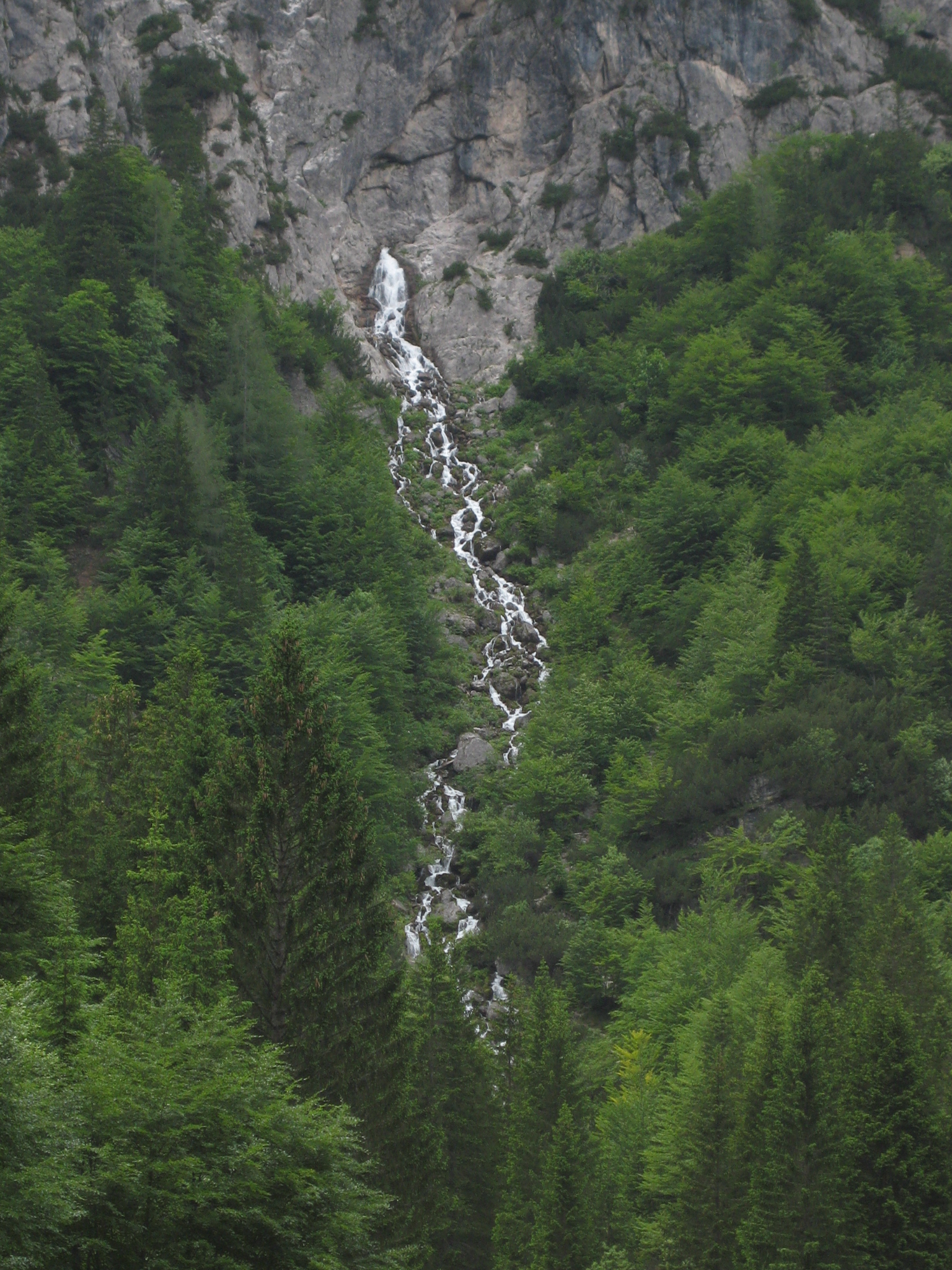

Location
- Country: Slovenia

Physical characteristics
- Source
  - coordinates: 46.4486°N 13.7092°E
- Mouth
  - location: Sava Dolinka

Basin features
- Progression: Sava Dolinka→ Sava→ Danube→ Black Sea

The Nadiža is a mountain stream near the town of Kranjska Gora, in the far northwestern corner of Slovenia. Springing from a bare rockface on the eastern slope of Mount Zadnja Ponca above the Tamar Valley in the Julian Alps, it is the first source of the Sava Dolinka River, the longer of the two sources of the Sava, the longest Slovene river at 221 km (137 mi) (length in Slovenia) and a tributary of the Danube.

The source of the Nadiža is near the Tamar Mountain Lodge; immediately after emerging, the water cascades down the cliff face in a 10 m (33 ft) waterfall, near which the Municipality of Kranjska Gora draws its water. The stream's surface course is only about 300 m (980 ft) long, although it flows far further underground after disappearing at the gravelly Ledine basin near Rateče. The Nadiža re-emerges through the porous bottom of a two-m deep lake called Zelenci, a marshy wetland with an extraordinarily rich ecosystem, which is regarded as the source of the Sava Dolinka.
