= Municipality of Kranjska Gora =

Municipality of Slovenia

Municipality of Kranjska Gora Občina Kranjska Gora
- Municipality
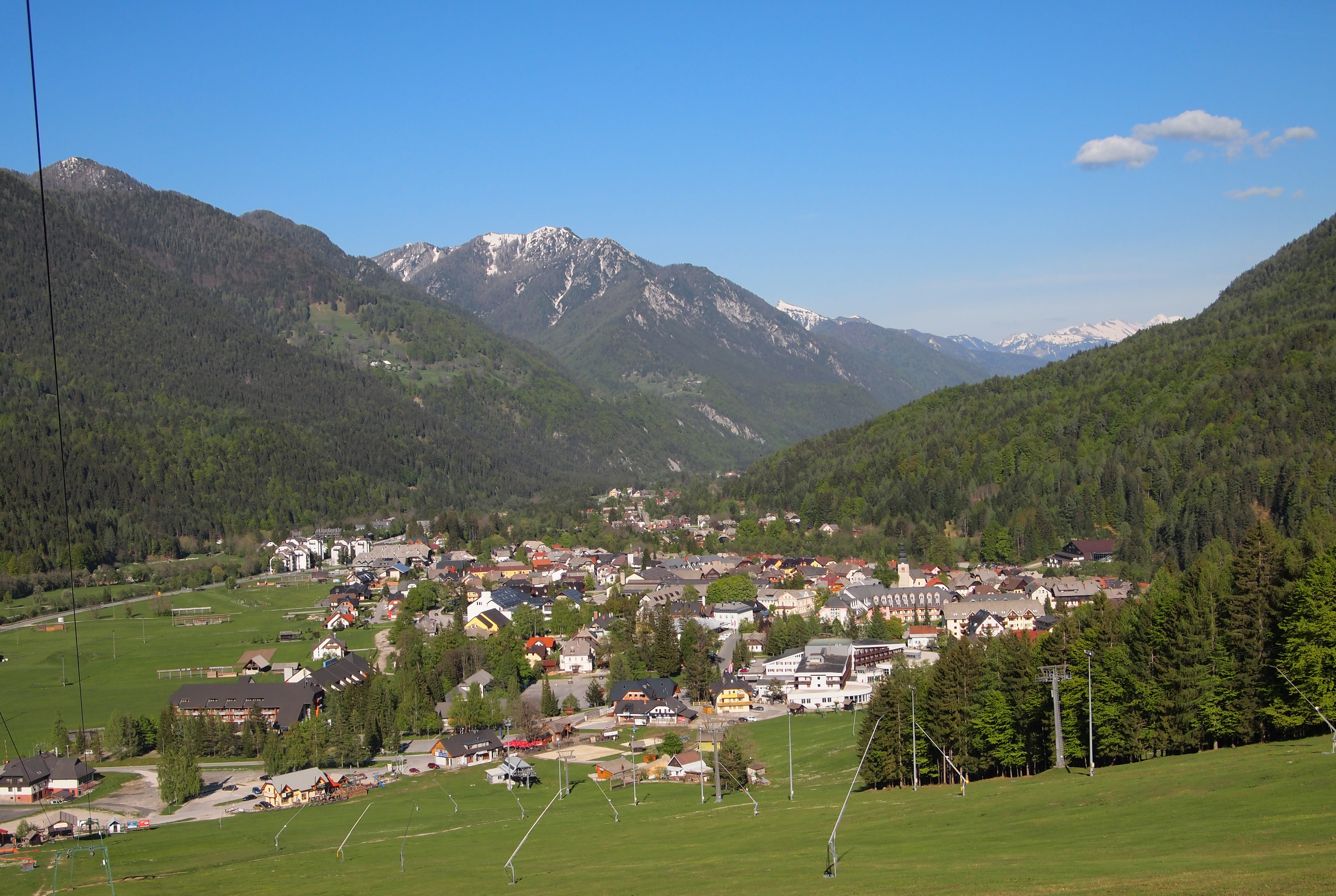

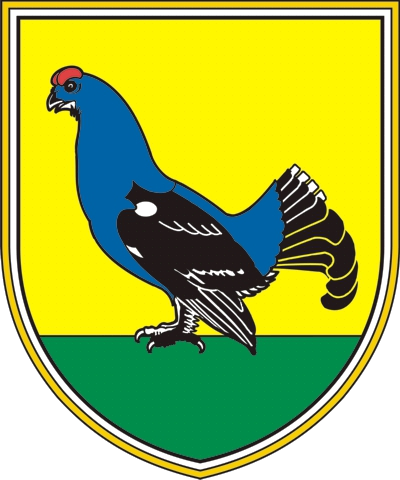
- Coat of arms

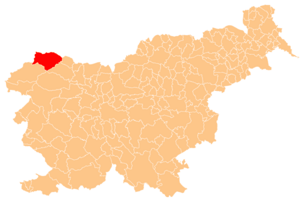
- Location of the Municipality of Kranjska Gora in Slovenia
- Coordinates: 46°29′N 13°47′E
- Country: Slovenia

Government
  - Mayor: Janez Hrovat (Alpska Lista)

Area
  - Total: 256.3 km^{2} (99.0 sq mi)

Population (2002)
  - Total: 5,500
  - Density: 21/km^{2} (56/sq mi)
- Time zone: UTC+01 (CET)
  - Summer (DST): UTC+02 (CEST)
- Website: kranjska-gora.si

The Municipality of Kranjska Gora (Slovene: [ˈkɾàːnska ˈɡɔ̀ːɾa]; Slovene: Občina Kranjska Gora) is a municipality on the Sava Dolinka River in the Upper Carniola region of northwest Slovenia, close to the Austrian and Italian borders. The seat of the municipality is the town of Kranjska Gora.

== Geography ==
The municipality is located in the Upper Sava Valley, a typical Alpine valley. Located at the far northwest of Slovenia where the borders of Slovenia, Austria, and Italy meet, the valley is embraced on the north and south by the peaks of the Karawanks and the Julian Alps. In the east its border runs just below the town of Jesenice, where the valley opens up towards the Radovljica Valley, extending in the west along the watershed between the Sava and Slizza rivers, just west of Rateče. In the north the Wurzenpass at Podkoren leads to Arnoldstein in Carinthia, in the south the Vršič Pass connects it with Trenta in the Slovenian Littoral region.

The Upper Sava Valley has an Alpine climate with its long, snow-abundant winters and shorter summers with moderate temperatures, easterly winds and sufficient rain to maintain the valley's greenery. The winter usually stays in the valley for between four and five months, and a blanket of snow usually covers the valley for just around four months. The lowest daytime temperature in January sometimes reaches −8 °C (18 °F), while on average it usually warms up during the day to just over freezing point. The average temperature in the hottest summer months is 10 °C (50 °F) in the morning, rising up to around 23 °C (73 °F) during the day. In winter, there are large differences between the sunny and shady slopes embracing the valley. The sunny slopes are accommodating to hikes and strolls, while the shady slopes retain a snow blanket.

=== Settlements ===
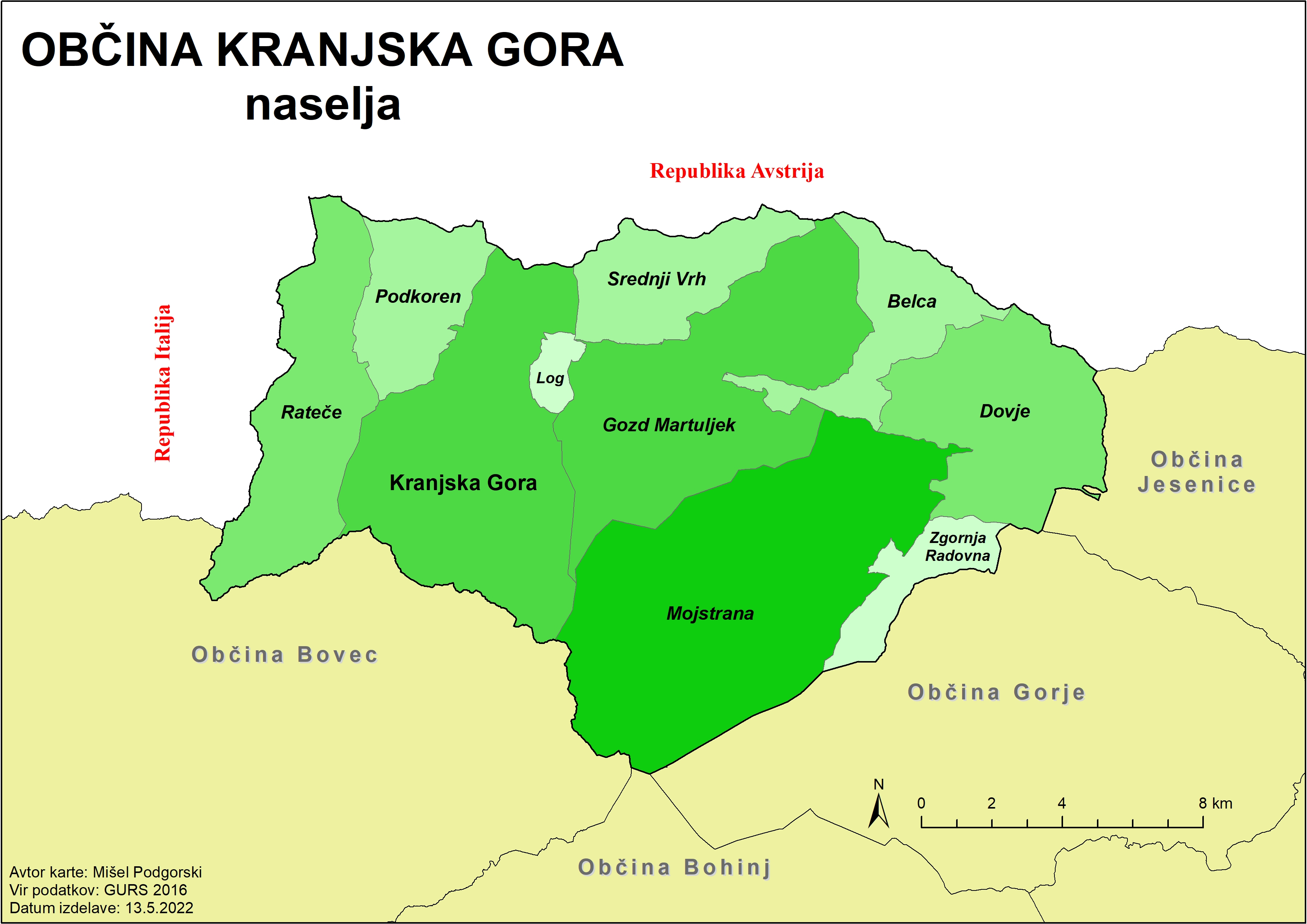
Villages in the municipality

In addition to the municipal seat of Kranjska Gora, the municipality also includes the following settlements:

- Belca
- Dovje
- Gozd–Martuljek
- Log
- Mojstrana
- Podkoren
- Rateče
- Srednji Vrh
- Zgornja Radovna

== Gallery ==
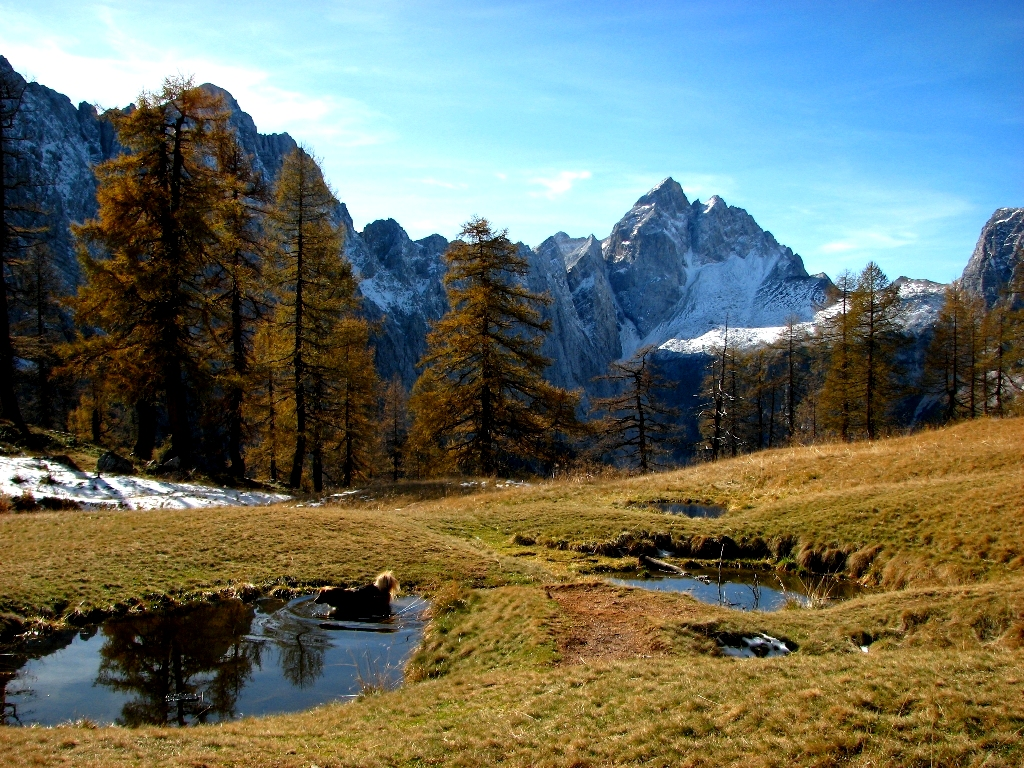
Mount Jalovec

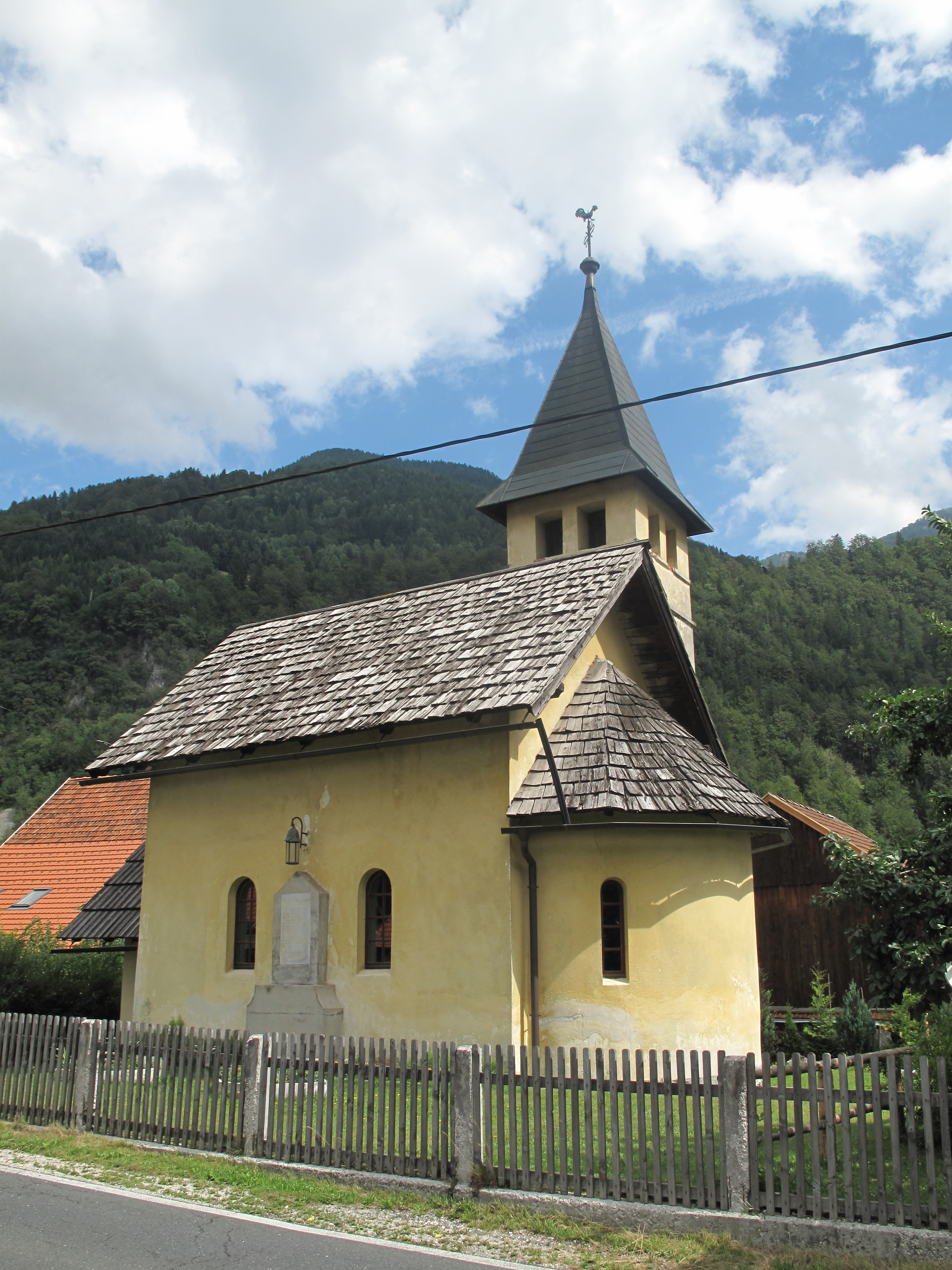
Church in Gozd Martuljek

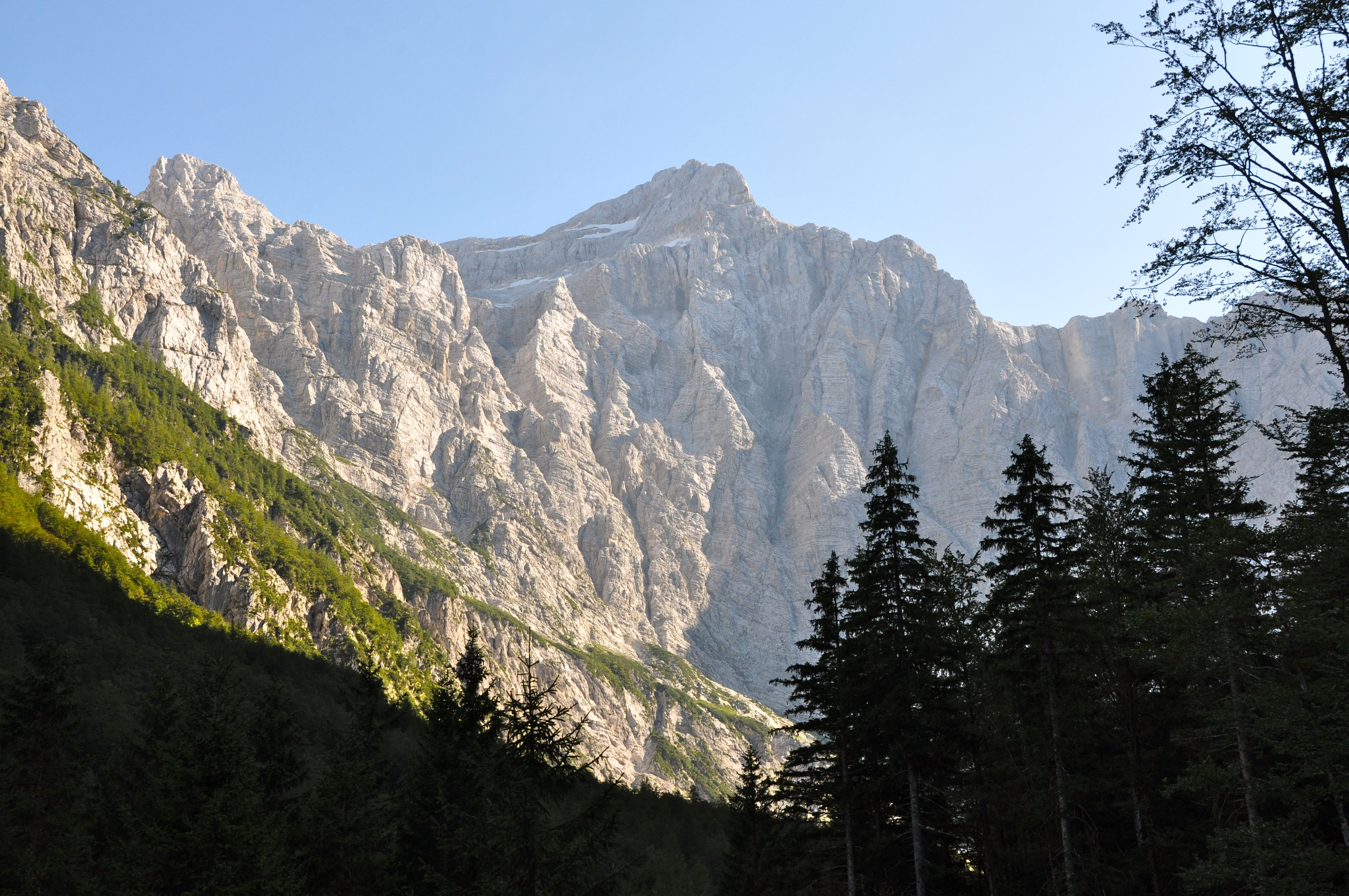
Northern wall of Mt. Triglav (Vrata Valley)

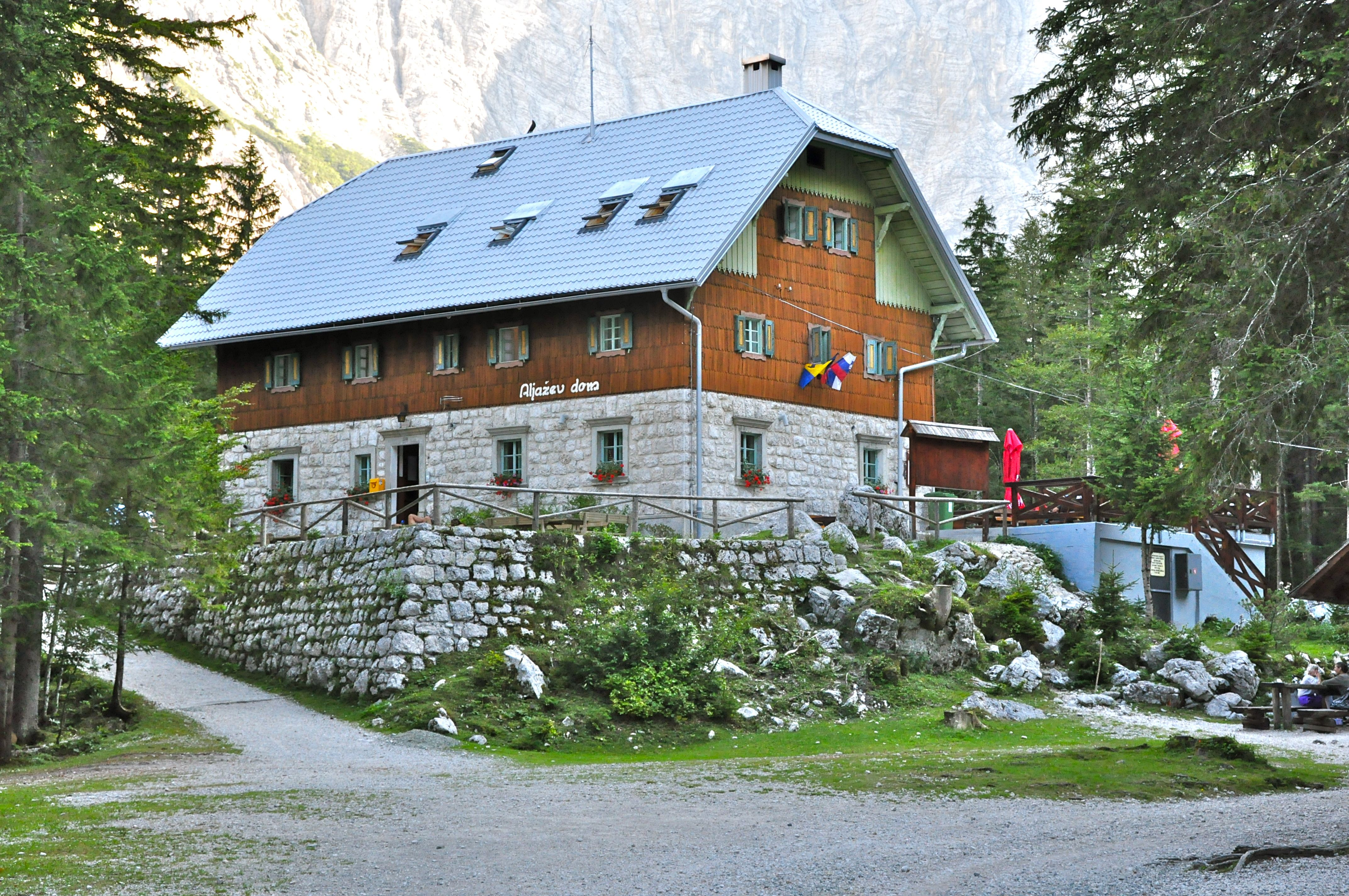
Aljaž Lodge (Vrata Valley)

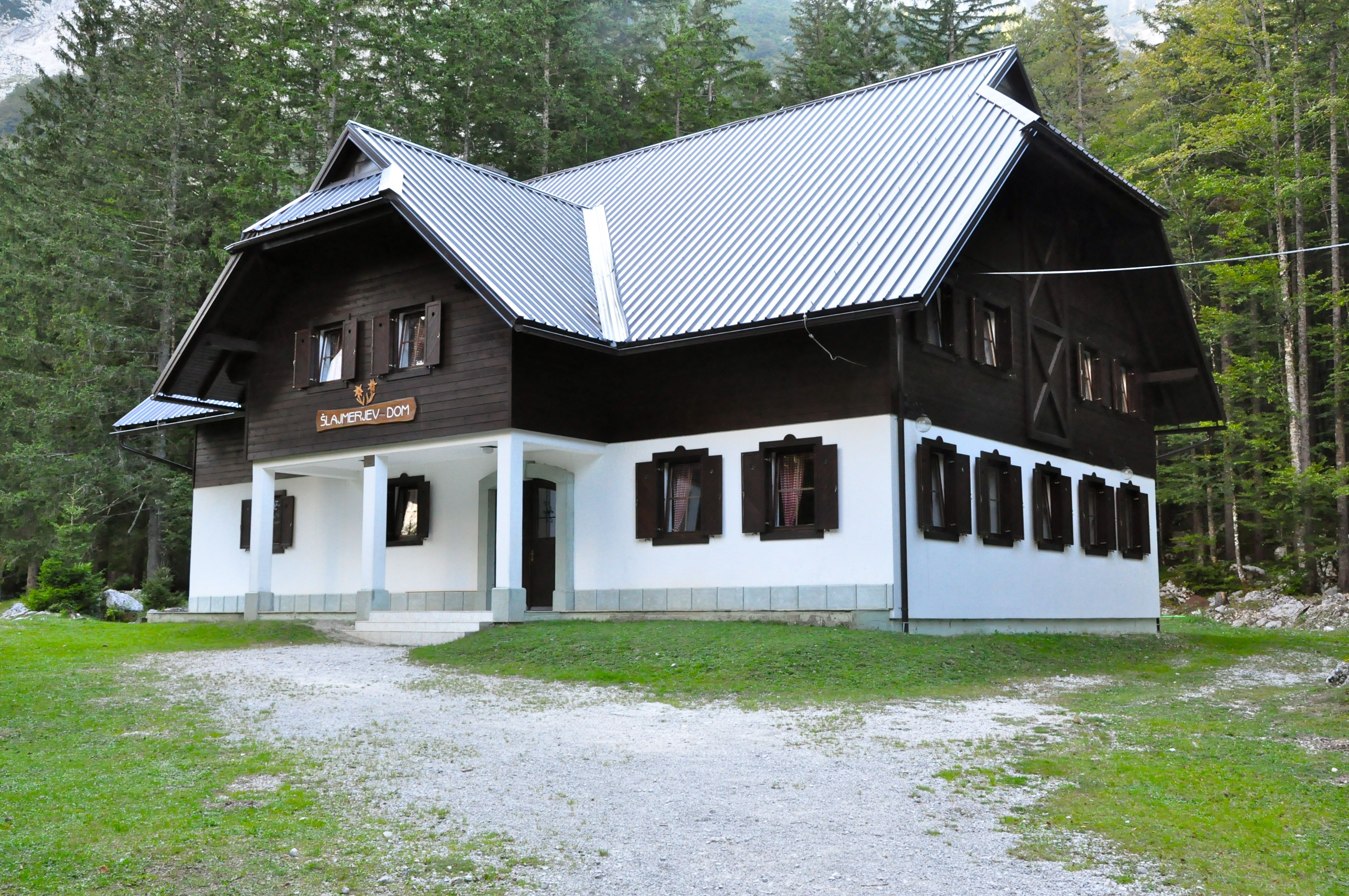
Šlajmer Lodge (Vrata Valley)

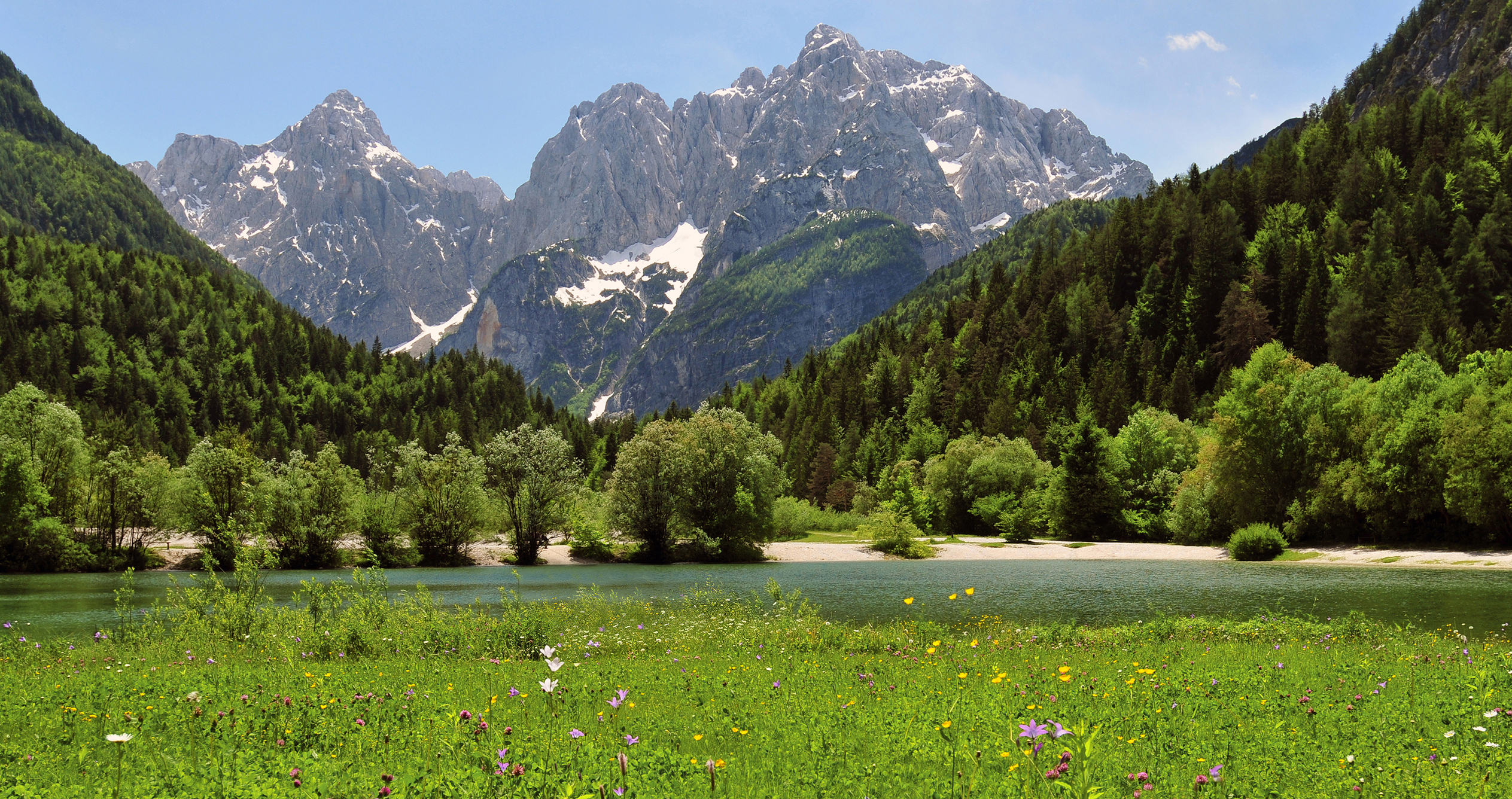
Julian Alps from Kranjska Gora, with Razor (left) and Prisojnik (right)

== See also ==
- Kranjska Gora Ski Resort
