= Zelenci =

Nature reserve in Slovenia

Coordinates: 46.492°N 13.7378°E

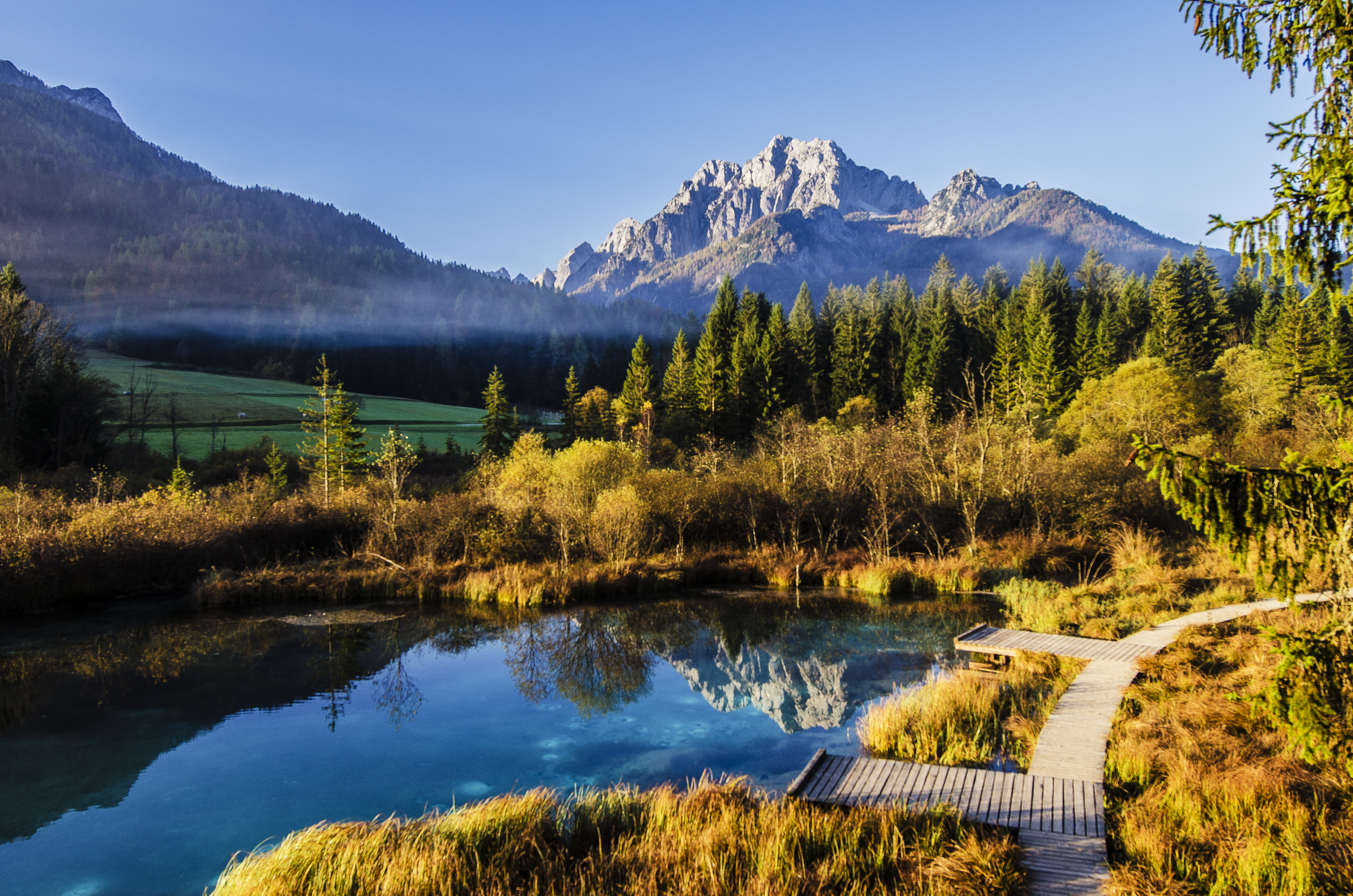
View towards the southwest: Lake Zelenci with the observation trail. In the background, the Ponce Mountains.

Zelenci Springs is a nature reserve near the town of Kranjska Gora, in the far northwestern corner of Slovenia. It is the source of the Sava Dolinka River, a tributary of the Danube.

At Zelenci Springs, water from underground Nadiža Creek (originating in the Planica Valley) re-emerges through the porous bottom of a 2 m deep lake, whose waters are noted for their deep, brilliant green. The spring and its surrounding area are named after this colour (Zelenci is a deadjectival plural noun from Slovene zelen 'green'.)

== Geology ==
Water jets on the lake bed

The Upper Sava Valley is the result of action by the Planica glacier, creeping from below Mount Jalovec, the Ponce Range, and Mount Mojstrovka. The area contains many lake sediments, suggesting that Zelenci Springs is a remnant of the once much larger Lake Koren, created by the retreat of the glacier, which carried along much debris. In retreat, the bulk of it was deposited at what is now Podkoren, damming the Sava with the Koren Pass, which hemmed in glacial melt and formed an extensive lake. The Sava then tunneled through this natural dam, lowering the water level of Lake Koren until only Zelenci Springs and its surrounding wetlands were left.

Zelenci Springs is considered the beginning of the longer of the two sources of the Sava, the longest Slovenian river at 221 km. The spring is actually the re-emergence of underground Nadiža Creek, whose first source is near the mountain lodge in the Tamar Valley, but which spends most of its course underground after disappearing at the Ledine gravel basin near Rateče.

The porous chalk of the Zelenci Springs lake bed allows the constant upwelling of groundwater in the form of tiny jets, a phenomenon unique in Slovenia. The lake formed by the springs has a constant year-round temperature of 5 to 6 °C. From the lake, the water flows into a stream, which empties eastward into the shallow Blata Marsh, which is 200 m wide and 1 km long. The actual riverbed of the Sava Dolinka does not begin until after this, at Podkoren beside the slopes of Mount Vitranc.

== History ==
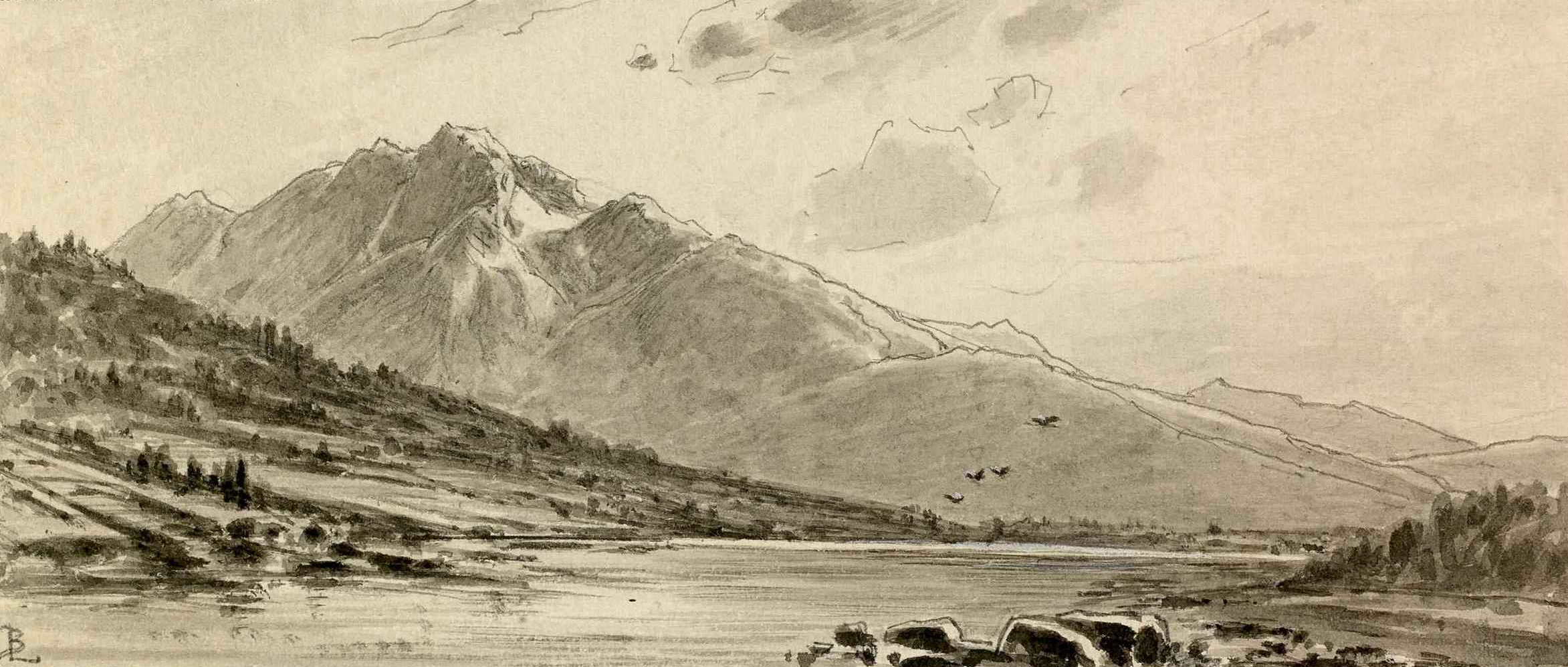
Zelenci Springs as depicted by Ladislau Benesch (1880–1900)

Zelenci Springs was declared a nature reserve in 1992, both for its geological interest and as home to numerous endangered animal and plant species. The area of the nature reserve is 47 ha. The maintained trails feature informational signage, as well as viewing bridges and an observation tower.

The natural environment, multiple springs and emerald-green lake also drew the attention of the painter Ladislau Benesch (1845–1922).

Sir Humphry Davy, the Cornish naturalist and a visitor to the area in the 19th century, wrote of it:

"The valley of the Save, with its cataracts and lakes, particularly struck me. I have seen nothing so beautiful in Europe."

== Flora ==
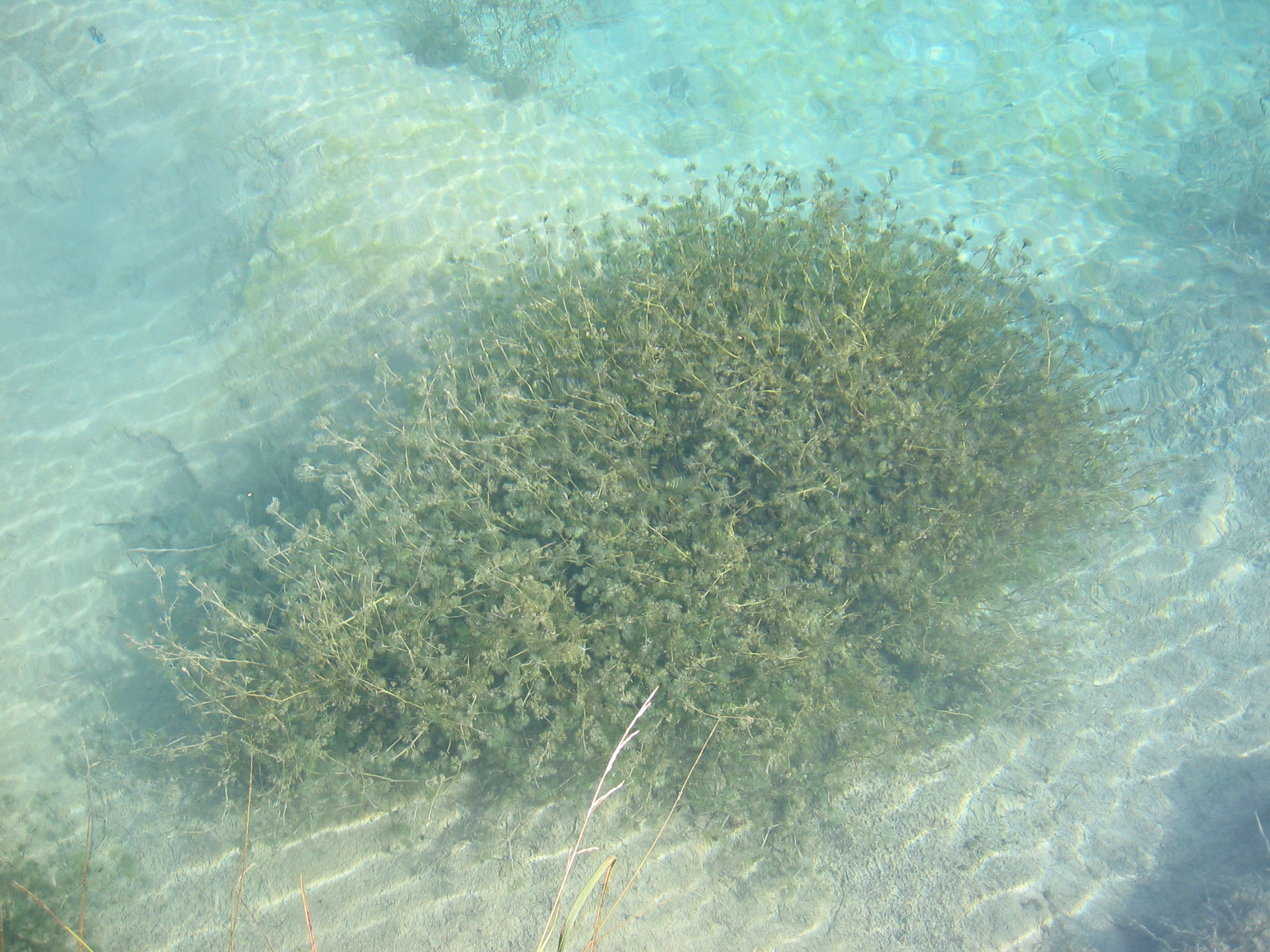
Baratrachium sp.

The surroundings of the spring are hospitable to plant life adapted to riparian habitats: carex, alder, and willows, and an assortment of flowering plants:

- Bogbean (Menyanthes trifoliata)
- Bog cotton (Eriophorum angustifolium)
- Marsh arrowgrass (Triglochin palustris)
- Marsh lousewort (Pedicularis palustris)
- Water crowfoot (Batrachium sp)

== Fauna ==
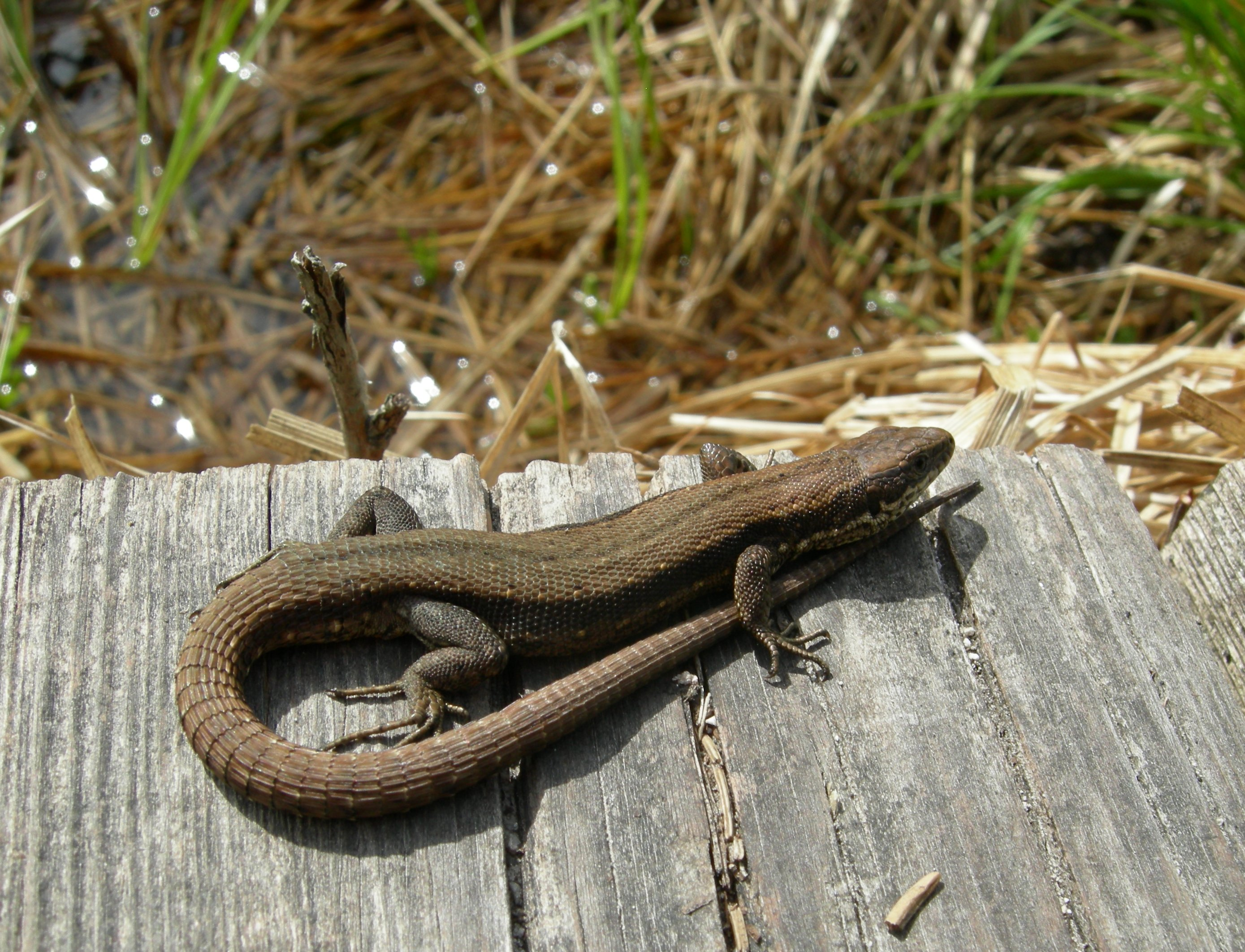
Viviparous lizard (Lacerta vivipara) on the trail

In addition to trout, which inhabit the lakes and feed on mayfly (Ephemeroptera) and stonefly (Plecoptera) larvae, the area has several endangered species on the Red List of Endangered Animal Species of Slovenia:

- Common rosefinch (Carpodacus erythrinus)
- Whiskered bat (Myotis mystacinus)
- Viviparous lizard (Lacerta vivipara)
- European adder (Vipera berus)
- Sand lizard (Lacerta agilis)

== Sources ==
- Decree on Declaration of Zelenci Springs as a Nature Reserve, Official Gazette nos. 53/92, 17/94, Official Gazette of Upper Carniola, no. 32/96 (Odlok o razglasitvi Zelencev za naravni rezervat, Uradni list št. 53/92, 17/94, Uradni vestnik Gorenjske, št. 32/96)
- Sinfo (Jan 2006) ISSN 1854-0805 http://www.ukom.gov.si/fileadmin/ukom.gov.si/pageuploads/Sinfo/2006-januar.pdf
