= Kranjska Gora Ski Resort =

Slovenian ski resort

Kranjska Gora
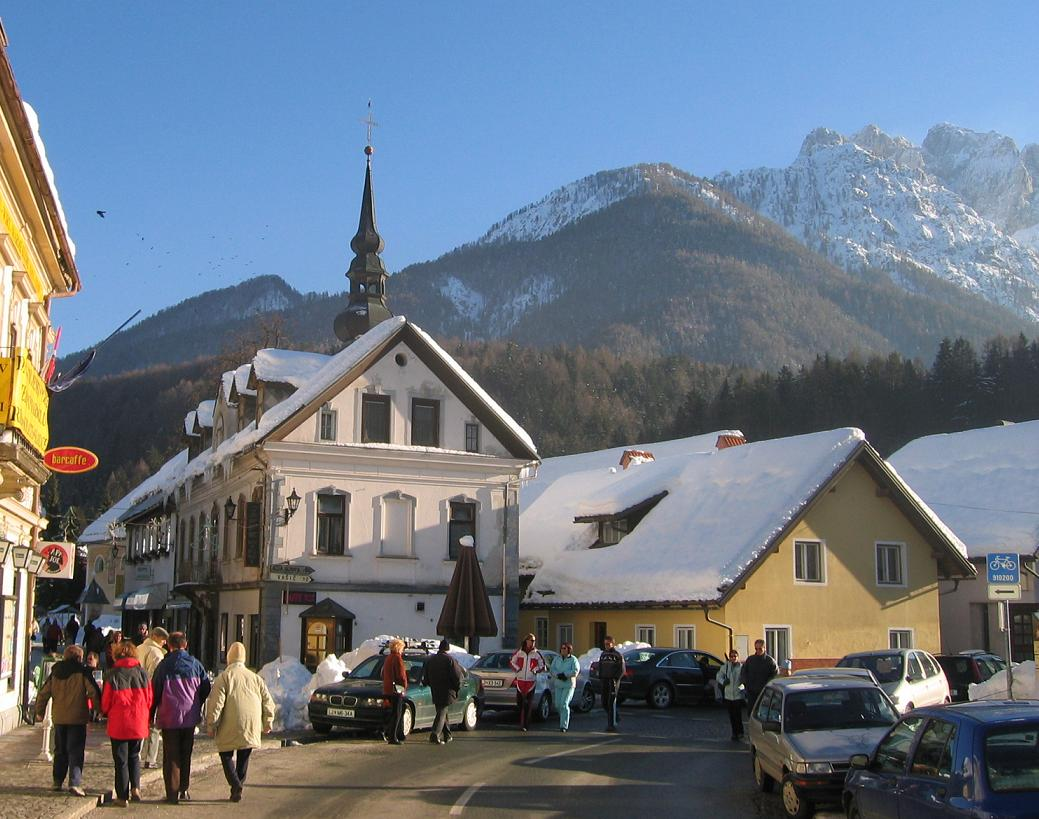
- Kranjska Gora old town center (2006)

- Location in the Alps Location in Slovenia
- Location: Kranjska Gora, Slovenia (Vitranc mountain)
- Nearest city: 57 km – Kranj; 61 km – Klagenfurt; 84 km – Ljubljana; 173 km – Trieste; 211 km – Maribor; 239 km – Venice; 341 km – Munich; 385 km – Vienna; 546 km – Budapest
- Coordinates: 46.485°N 13.779°E
- Vertical: 484 m (1,588 ft)
- Top elevation: 1,295 m (4,249 ft)
- Base elevation: 811 m (2,661 ft)
- Skiable area: 125 hectares (310 acres)
- Trails: 20 km (12 mi) in total: 10 km (6 mi); 8 km (5 mi); 2 km (1.2 mi)
- Longest run: 3.8 km (2.4 mi)
- Lift system: 19 lifts in total: 13 surface 1 onechair 1 doublechair 4 fourchair
- Lift capacity: 20,200 per hour
- Terrain parks: 1
- Snowmaking: yes
- Website: kr-gora.si

Kranjska Gora Ski Resort is Slovenia's oldest ski resort at Kranjska Gora, Upper Carniola, opened in 1948. It is divided into five different sections under the Vitranc Mountain, stretched throughout the whole valley of the same name municipality: Mojstrana, Kranjska Gora, Planica, Podkoren 1, and Podkoren 2. It has a total of 20 km (12 miles) of ski slopes, 40 km (25 miles) tracks for cross-country skiing, and Snow Fun Park.

Since 1961, resort is hosting Vitranc Cup, one of the oldest and most prestigious active alpine skiing competitions in the world, and being classic regular World Cup host since 1968 season.

"Podkoren 3", which is hosting World Cup events since 1983, is the steepest and most difficult groomed ski course in Slovenia with maximum incline at 30.5° degrees (59%).

== History ==
=== 1948: First ski lift in Slovenia ===
On 29 November 1948, first ever Slovenian ski resort and lift (surface) was officially opened at "Preseka" slope. It was 960 m long and 265 m different height, with lift capacity of 170 skiers per hour.

=== 1961: Vitranc Cup premiere ===
On 4–5 March 1961, first Vitranc Cup was held with men's giant slalom and slalom, both international "FIS 1A" events. Josef Stiegler (AUT) won GS and Ernst Falch (AUT) won SL next day. Start of first GS was at 1,552 metres, just under the top of Vitranc Mountain with Finish at 1,035 metres on the route of notorious "Bukovnik downhill". It was so steep, dangerous and scary, that it was too much even for the best skilled skiers in world. The whole upper slope was compared and known as "harakiri with acceleration". Even worse than Streif downhill course in Kitzbühel.

=== 1968: World Cup debut ===
On 10 March 1968, Kranjska Gora hosted first World Cup event at old extra demanding and steep course above ex gas station. French skier Patrick Russel won the World Cup slalom.

=== 1982: Record attendance ===
On 20 March 1982, domestic superhero Bojan Križaj took first ever World Cup victory for Slovenia in home country, winning SL by beating legendary Ingemar Stenmark, with record attendance of 32,000 people.

Until this day this is still the most attended alpine ski competition in Slovenia ever. It is part of Slovenian sport folklore and popculture, the most famous and worshiped alpine ski event in history of Slovenia.

== Ski slopes ==
Slope	Length	Level
↓ Kranjska Gora ↓
Kekec	730 m	
Dolenčev rut	1000 m	
Vitranc 1	1229 m	
Mojca 1	1254 m	
Mojca 2	448 m	
Rožle	550 m	
Preseka 2	806 m	
Tinkara	313 m	
Brsnina	452 m	
↓ Podkoren 1 ↓
Podkoren	1200 m	
Zelenci	398 m	
Ruteč 1	761 m	
↓ Podkoren 2 ↓
Velika dolina	1237 m	
Bedanec	754 m	
Kolovrat	497 m	
↓ Planica ↓
Slatna	270 m	
↓ Rateče ↓
Macesnovc	1070 m	
↓ Mojstrana ↓
Mojstrana	650 m	

== Resort statistics ==
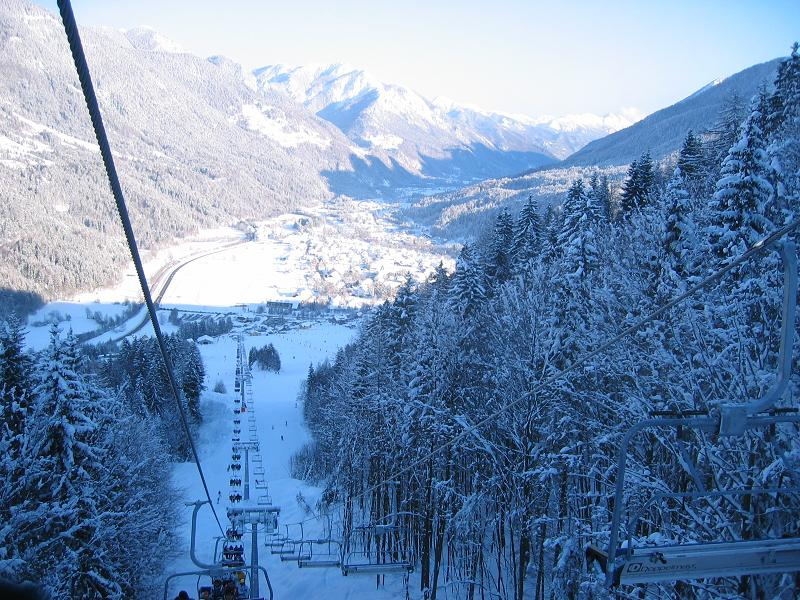
Vitranc 1 lift in 2005

Elevation
Summit - 1,623 m (5,325 ft), Base - 795 m (2,608 ft),

Ski Terrain
1.25 km^{2} (310 acres) - 19 named runs covering around 30 km (19 miles) on one mountain, but four different areas.

Slope Difficulty
- 2 slopes expert
- 5 slopes advanced
- 8 slopes intermediate
- 2 slopes beginner

Vertical Drop: 481 m (1,578 ft)

Longest Run: "Velika dolina" - 1.237 km (0.77 miles)

== Other activities ==
- Snow Fun Park/Halfpipe
- Cross country skiing (40 km (25 miles))
- Sledding, Bike Park, Tubing (only in summer) & hiking

== Club5+ ==
In 1986, elite Club5 was originally founded by prestigious classic downhill organizers: Kitzbühel, Wengen, Garmisch, Val d’Isère and Val Gardena/Gröden, with goal to bring alpine ski sport on the highest levels possible.

Later over the years other classic longterm organizers joined the now named Club5+: Alta Badia, Cortina, Kranjska Gora, Maribor, Lake Louise, Schladming, Adelboden, Kvitfjell, St.Moritz and Åre.

== See also ==
- Kranjska Gora
