= Log, Kranjska Gora =

Log
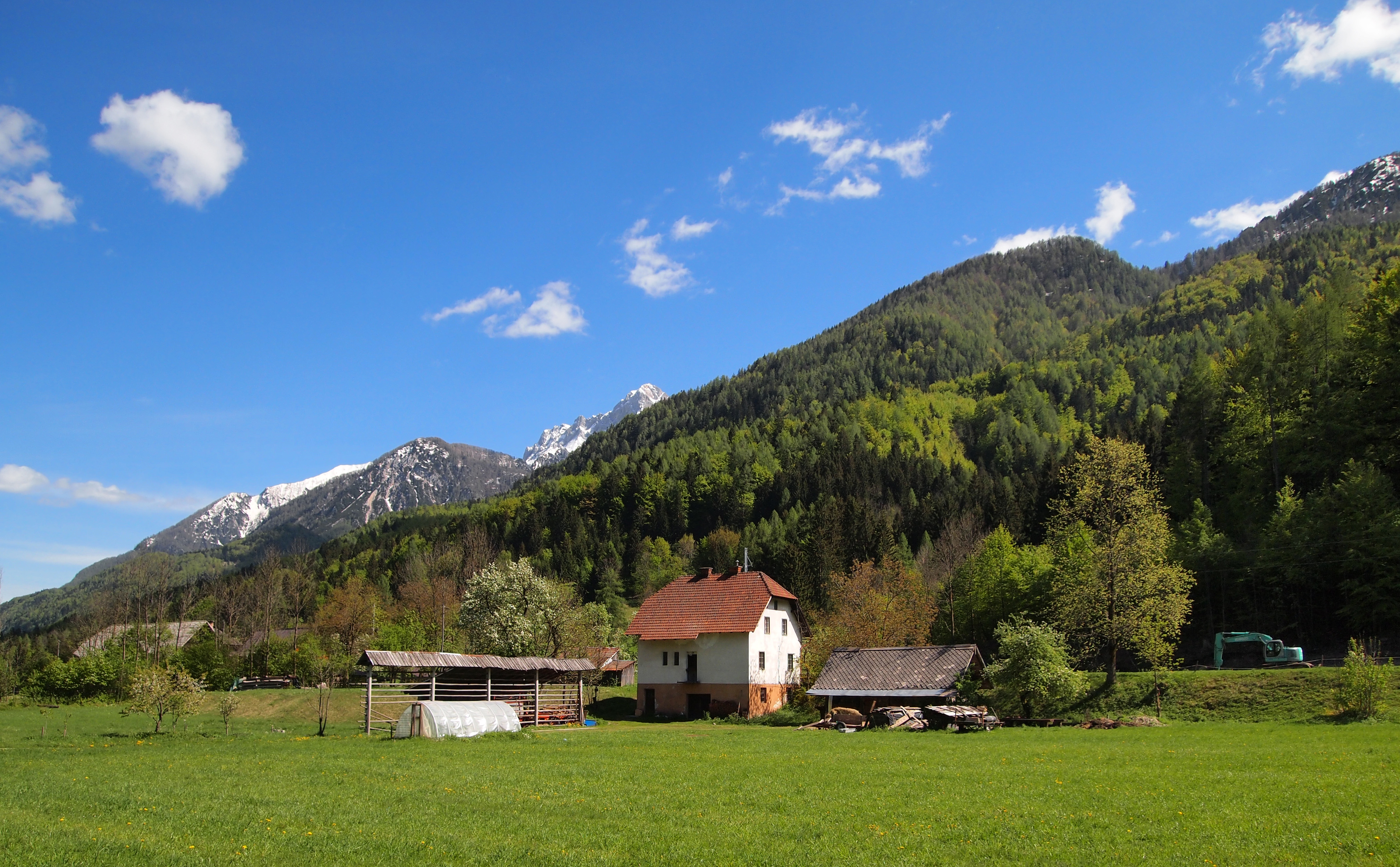
- House in Log

- Location in Slovenia
- Coordinates: 46°29′12.95″N 13°48′22.39″E
- Country: Slovenia
- Traditional region: Upper Carniola
- Statistical region: Upper Carniola
- Municipality: Kranjska Gora
- Elevation: 778.6 m (2,554 ft)

Population (2002)
  - Total: 80

Log (pronounced [ˈloːk]) is a settlement in the Municipality of Kranjska Gora in the Upper Carniola region of Slovenia. Development has resulted in a contiguous built-up area connecting Log and Kranjska Gora.
