= Belca =

- Location in Slovenia
- Coordinates: 46°28′30.71″N 13°54′38.84″E
- Country: Slovenia
- Traditional region: Upper Carniola
- Statistical region: Upper Carniola
- Municipality: Kranjska Gora
- Elevation: 692.4 m (2,272 ft)

Population (2002)
  - Total: 163

Belca (pronounced [ˈbeːltsa]) is a settlement in the Municipality of Kranjska Gora in the Upper Carniola region of Slovenia.

== History ==
In August 1963, the Belca Gorge north of the village was the site where the anti-communist revolutionary Janez Toplišek (1930–1965) was ambushed by the Yugoslav secret police and taken into custody. Toplišek had crossed the border from Austria with weapons and propaganda material, unwittingly accompanied by two Yugoslav secret police agents. After his arrest he was initially imprisoned with other enemies of the communist regime at the Goli Otok prison camp, and then moved to the Stara Gradiška prison, where he was killed during an escape attempt on November 15, 1965.
