= Wurzen Pass =

Mountain pass on the Austria-Slovenia border

Wurzenpass
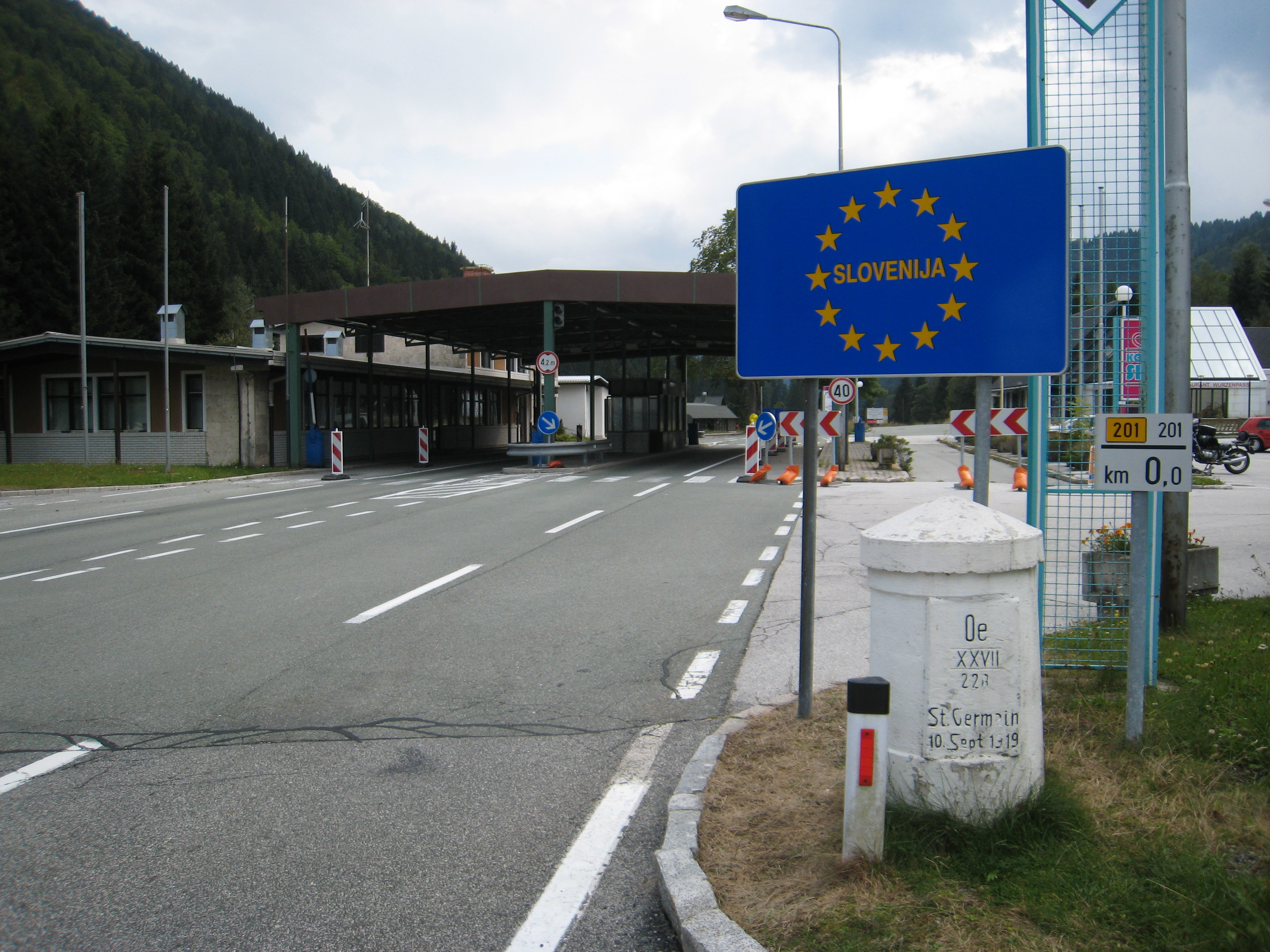
- Austria–Slovenia border with stone marker bearing "XXVII St. Germain 10. Sept. 1919"

- Location within Alps
- Elevation: 1,073 metres (3,520 ft)
- Traversed by: road

Third Approach
- Location: Austria–Slovenia border
- Range: Karawanks
- Coordinates: 46°31′19″N 13°45′9″E

The Wurzen Pass (German: Wurzenpass, Slovene: Korensko sedlo) is a mountain pass in a col of the Karawanks mountain range in the Southern Limestone Alps, on the border between Radendorf in the Austrian state of Carinthia and Kranjska Gora in Slovenia. It is named after the nearby village of Podkoren (Wurzen).

The pass connects the Austrian B109 Wurzenpass Straße from Villach with the Slovenian highway No. 201 to the A2 motorway and Ljubljana. Though its elevation of 1,073 m (3,520 ft) is relatively moderate, the road contains numerous curves and includes several steep ascents with a maximum grade of 18 percent.

== History ==
The Wurzenpass has been a historic crossing of the Karawanks, though the main trade route from the Duchy of Carinthia to Trieste, the Austrian Littoral and Carniola ran from Tarvisio along the Predil Pass and the high valley of Rateče that was much easier to traverse. Its importance increased with the lay out of a first paved road finished in 1734. During the Cold War the Austrian Armed Forces built several defence works and bunkers along the Wurzenpass Straße which today are open to the public in the context of a documentation centre.

Until the opening of the Karawanks Motorway Tunnel in 1991, the Wurzenpass along with the eastern Loibl (Ljubelj) was one of the main arteries for traffic from Austria through former Yugoslavia, starting point of the notorious autoput highway to Greece and Turkey. When Slovenia joined the European Union on 1 May 2004, customs controls were removed from the border. As Slovenia entered the Schengen Area in 2007, passport controls with police checkpoints were consequently abolished on 21 December 2007.

== See also ==
- List of highest paved roads in Europe
- List of mountain passes
