= Podkoren =

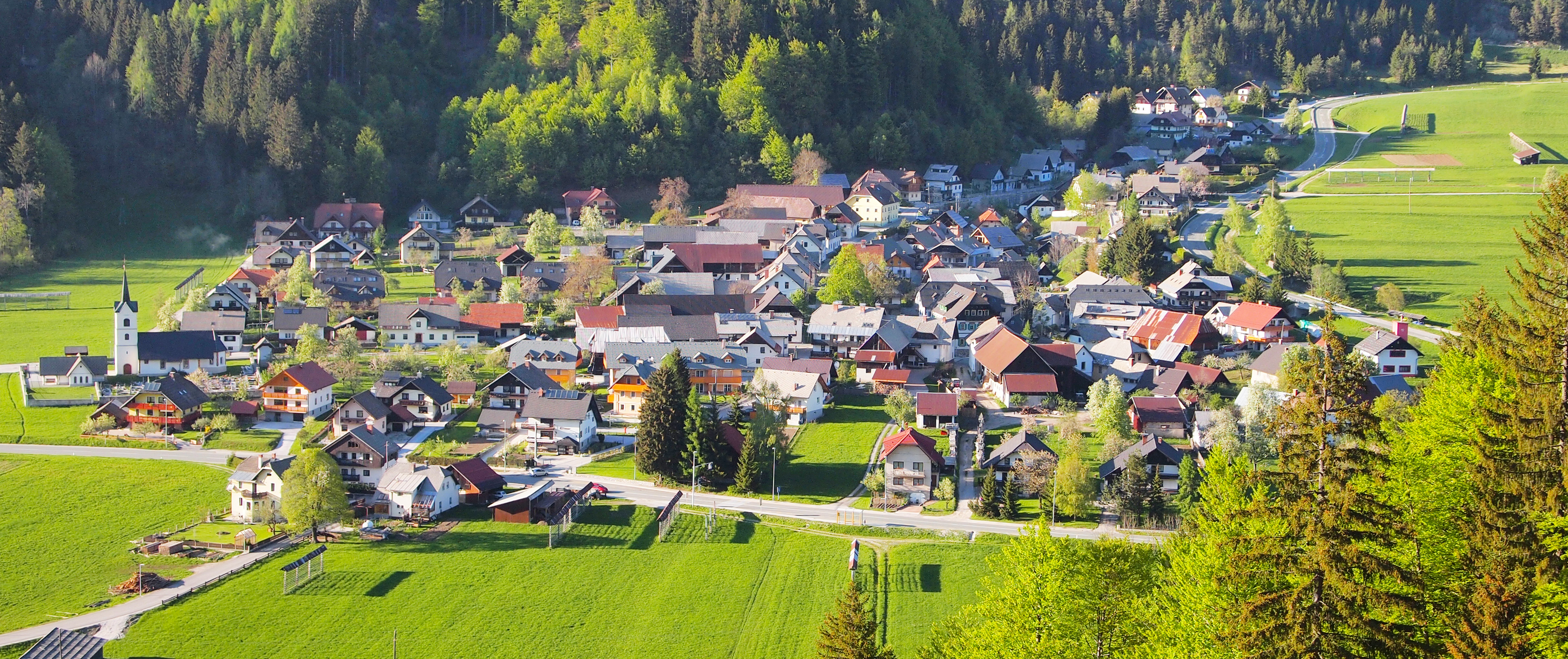
- View from south

- Location in Slovenia
- Coordinates: 46°29′41.8″N 13°45′21.67″E
- Country: Slovenia
- Traditional region: Upper Carniola
- Statistical region: Upper Carniola
- Municipality: Kranjska Gora
- Elevation: 860.6 m (2,823 ft)

Population (2002)
  - Total: 388

Podkoren (pronounced [pɔˈtkoːɾɛn], German: Wurzen) is a village in the Municipality of Kranjska Gora, in the northwestern Upper Carniola region of Slovenia.

== Geography ==
Podkoren is located directly beneath the Wurzen Pass ("Koren" in Slovene), which lends its name to the settlement ("below Koren"). It is technically the first human settlement of the Upper Sava Valley; the Zelenci nature reserve, the source of the Sava, is located just west of the village.

The village contains a roundabout where the Podkoren / Wurzen Pass road (spanning the Karawanks to the Austrian state of Carinthia) branches off from an extension of the A2 motorway (leading from the Ljubljana Basin to the Italian border.)

Dairy farming having declined, the economy of modern Podkoren is now heavily dependent on tourism. Skiing is the main attraction, with several popular pistes located on the slopes of the Karawanks directly above the settlement.

== History ==
From the 15th century onward, Podkoren—in the far northwest of the Duchy of Carniola—served as a toll station on the steep road across the Wurzen pass, for centuries the shortest and most direct link from the Littoral towns of Trieste and Gorizia to Villach in Carinthia. Today, the settlement's main link to the world is the A2 motorway, which runs to Austria through the Karawanks Tunnel a few kilometers to the east.

Podkoren was formerly served by the Tarvisio–Ljubljana Railway, inaugurated in 1870 by Austria-Hungary; the Slovene line was closed and dismantled in 1969, two years after Italian side had been shuttered due to Cold War tensions.

The village church is dedicated to Saint Andrew and is of late Gothic origin (as are many houses in the village) but has since been heavily refurbished in the Baroque style.

The pioneering British chemist and naturalist Humphry Davy (1778–1829) stayed i Podkoren during his several visits to the Upper Sava Valley, for whose natural beauty he expressed great admiration.

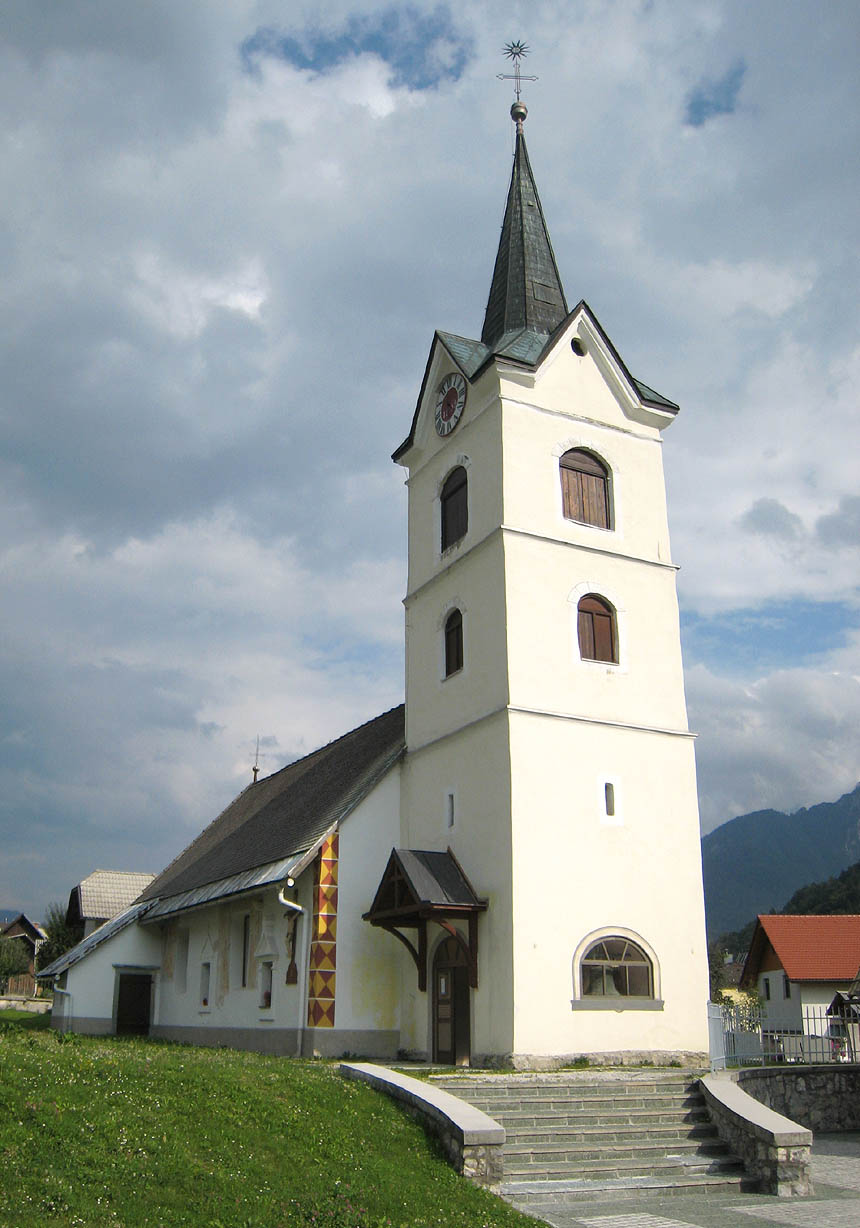
St. Andrew's Church, Podkoren

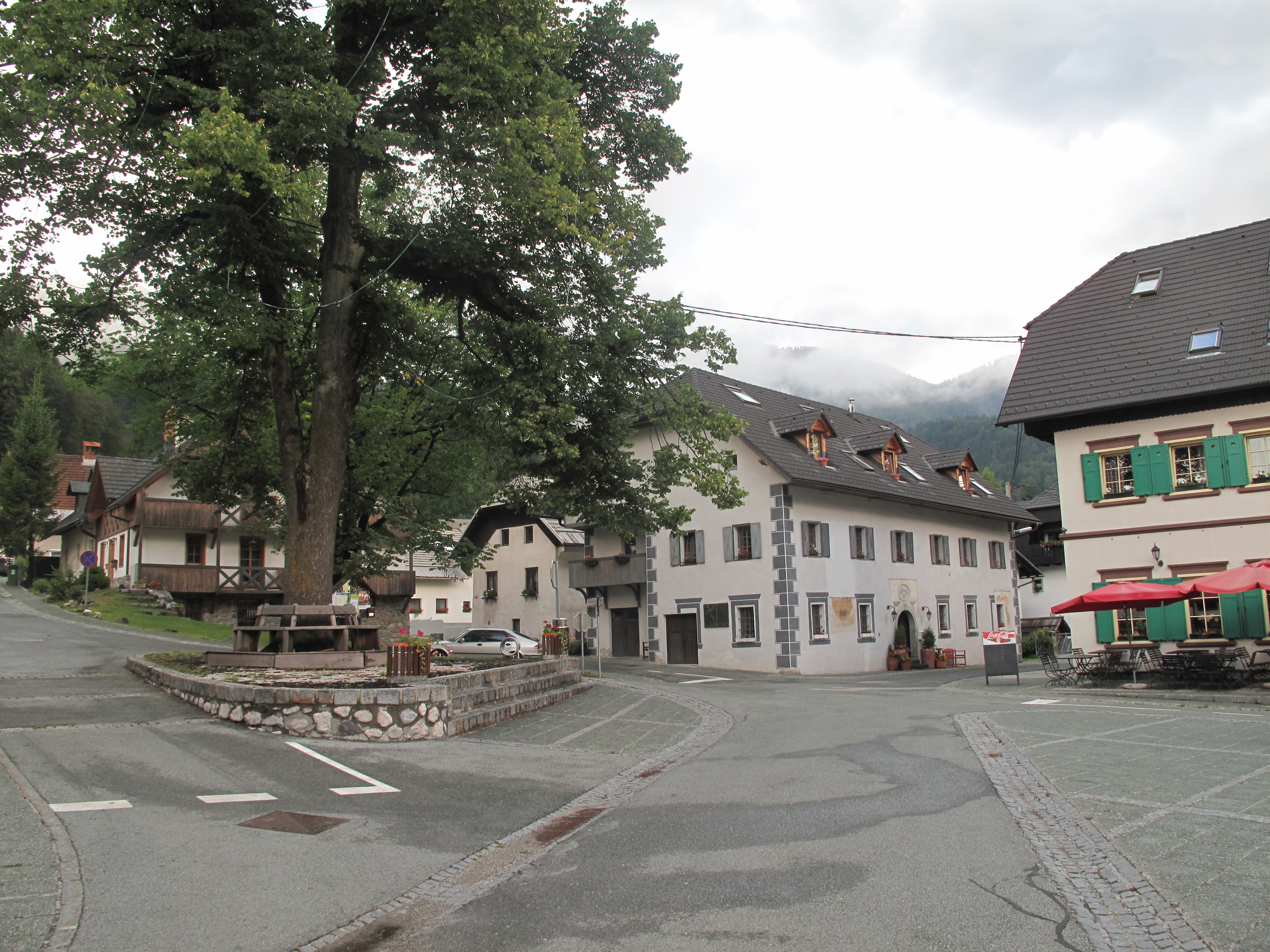
Podkoren, view of a street

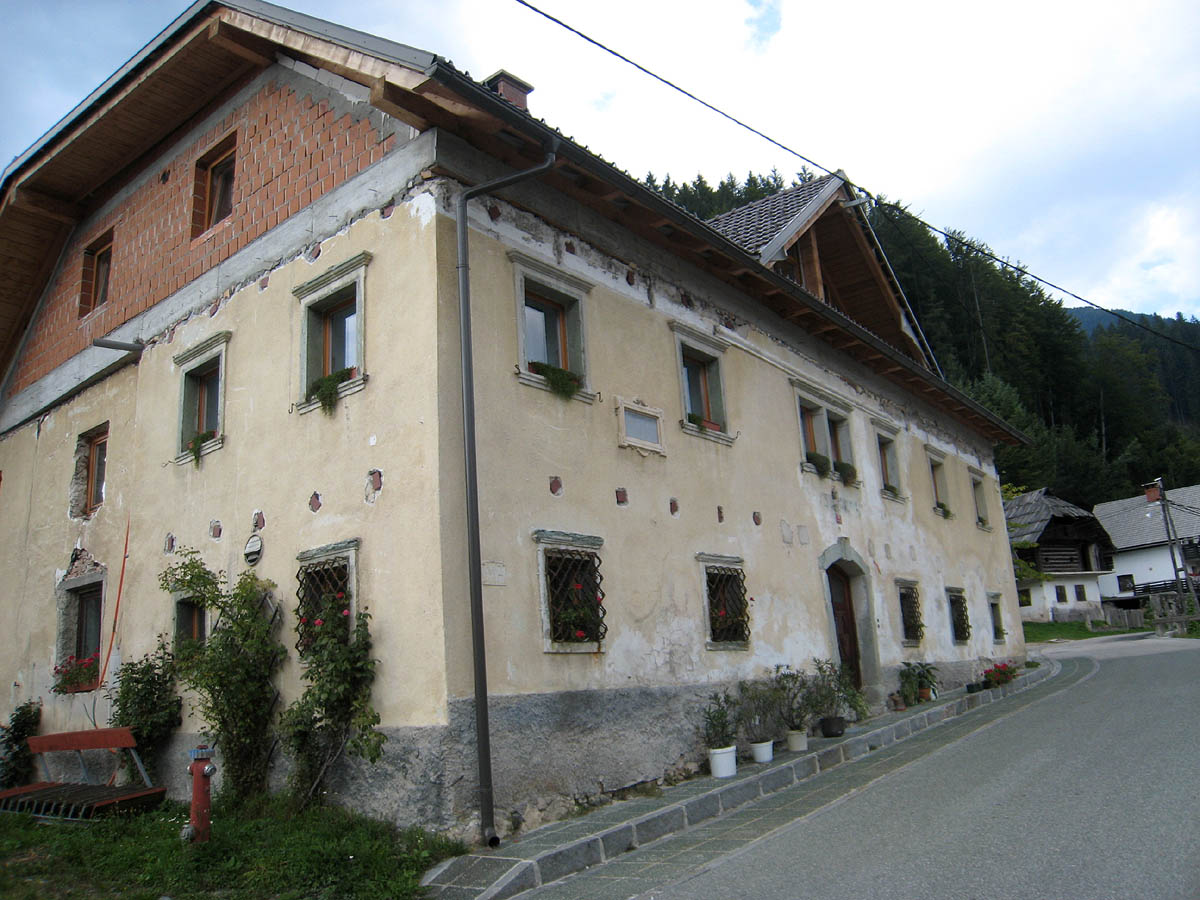
The house in which Humphry Davy stayed

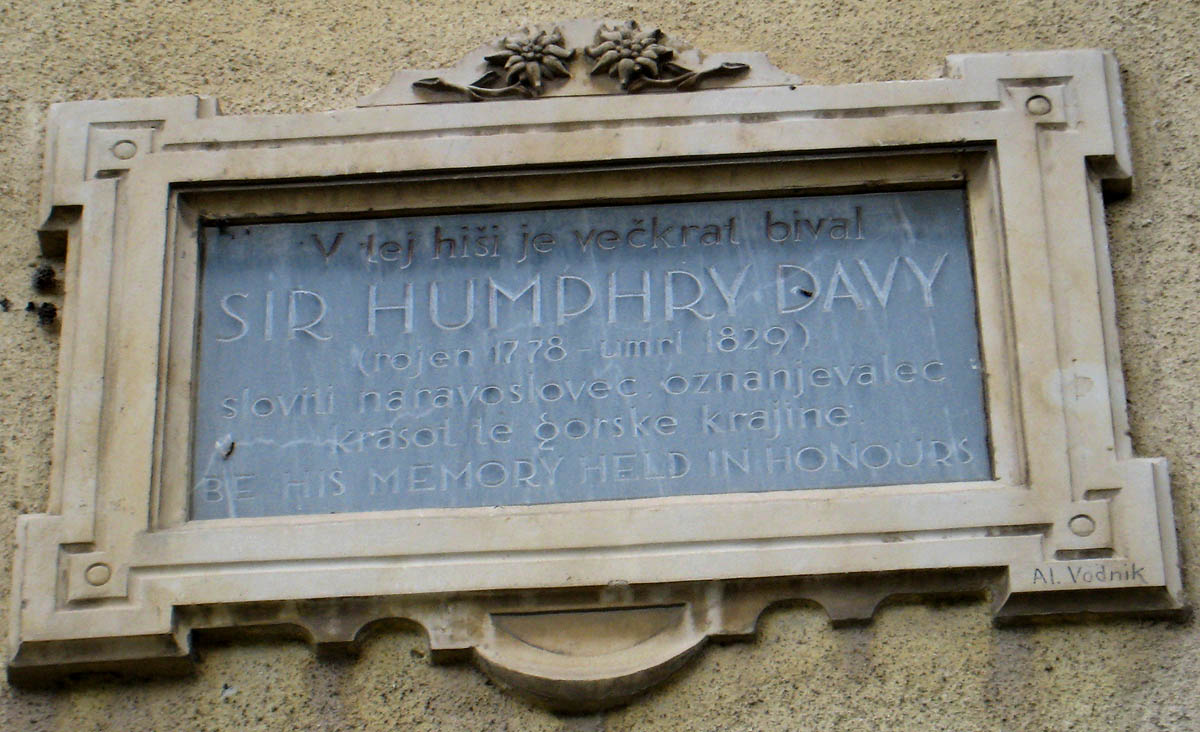
Plaque commemorating Humphry Davy's stay
