= Upper Sava Valley =

Region of northern Slovenia

Coordinates: 46°28′16″N 13°54′42″E

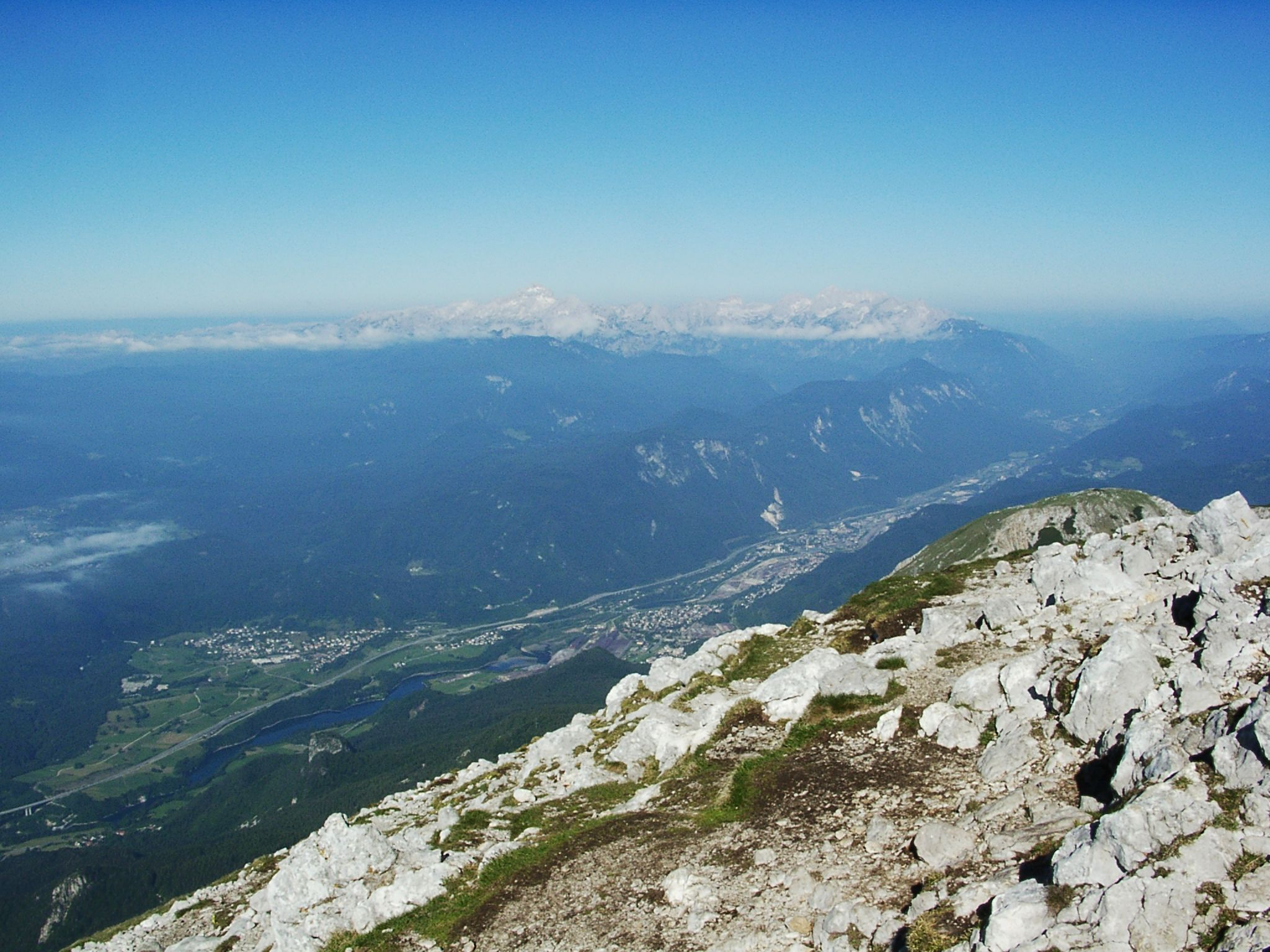
View up the Upper Sava Valley from Mount Stol

The Upper Sava Valley (Slovene: Zgornjesavska dolina) is an alpine valley in the Upper Carniola region of Slovenia. The Sava Dolinka River flows along it. It begins in Rateče at an elevation of 870 m and ends at Moste at 560 m. It is the geographical border between the Julian Alps and the Karawanks. It was created on a tectonic fault that runs down the middle of the valley. Its geomorphological forms are a result of the actions of the river and glaciers. A number of smaller valleys lead into it from both sides.

The largest settlements in the valley are Kranjska Gora and Jesenice. Some of the traditional and modern settlements are located on active alluvial fans that may cause a threat of the modelled torrents and debris flows.
