= Rateče =

Village in Upper Carniola, Slovenia

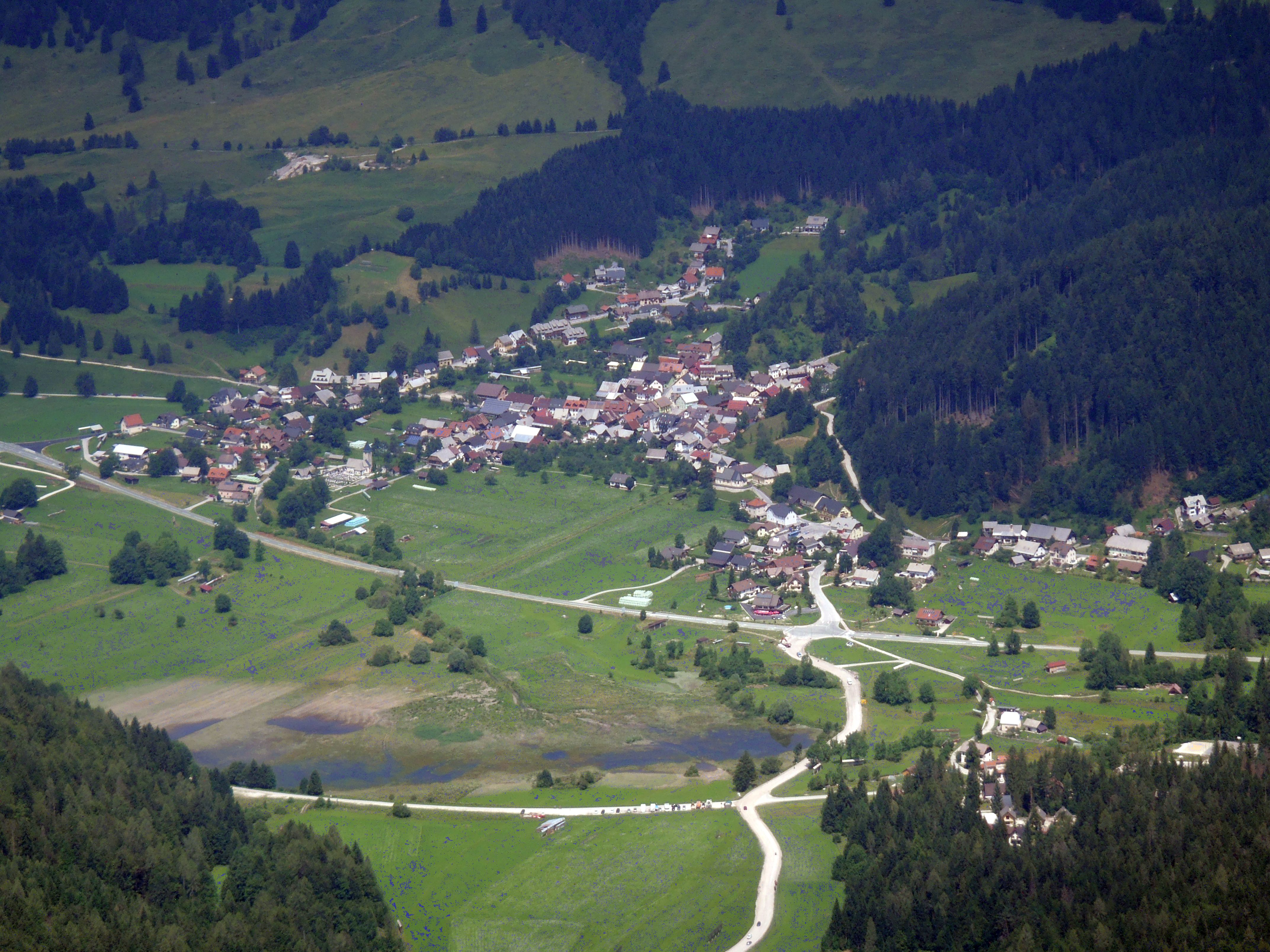
- Rateče, view from Mount Ciprnik (July 2016)

- Location in Slovenia
- Coordinates: 46°29′53″N 13°42′58″E
- Country: Slovenia
- Traditional region: Upper Carniola
- Statistical region: Upper Carniola
- Municipality: Kranjska Gora
- Elevation: 863.6 m (2,833 ft)

Population (2002)
  - Total: 639
- Postal code: 4382

Rateče (pronounced [ˈɾaːtɛtʃɛ]; Italian: Racchia, German: Ratschach) is a village in the Municipality of Kranjska Gora, in the far northwest corner of Slovenia. It is located in the upper part of the Upper Sava Valley, between the Sava Dolinka and Ziljica rivers, a tributary of the Drava. Further up the valley is the Rateče border crossing to Italy. Rateče is the closest Slovenian village to the summit of Mount Peč, also known in Slovene as Tromeja (or "tri-border", for the meeting point of the borders of Austria, Italy, and Slovenia at its summit.)

== History ==
The settlement was first mentioned in 1385. It still retains much of its historic character. One of the oldest surviving churches in Slovenia, the Saint Thomas's Church, is located in the village. The Rateče (or Klagenfurt) Manuscript, one of the earliest surviving Slovene texts, is thought to have been compiled in the Rateče area (possibly at Saint Thomas's Church) during the second half of the 14th century. The cadastral community of Rateče was split into two parts by the new Italian–Yugoslav border after the treaties that followed the First World War; Yugoslavia acquired the eastern portion, which includes the main settlement of Rateče, and Italy the western mountainous portion, which is still part of the municipality of Tarvisio.

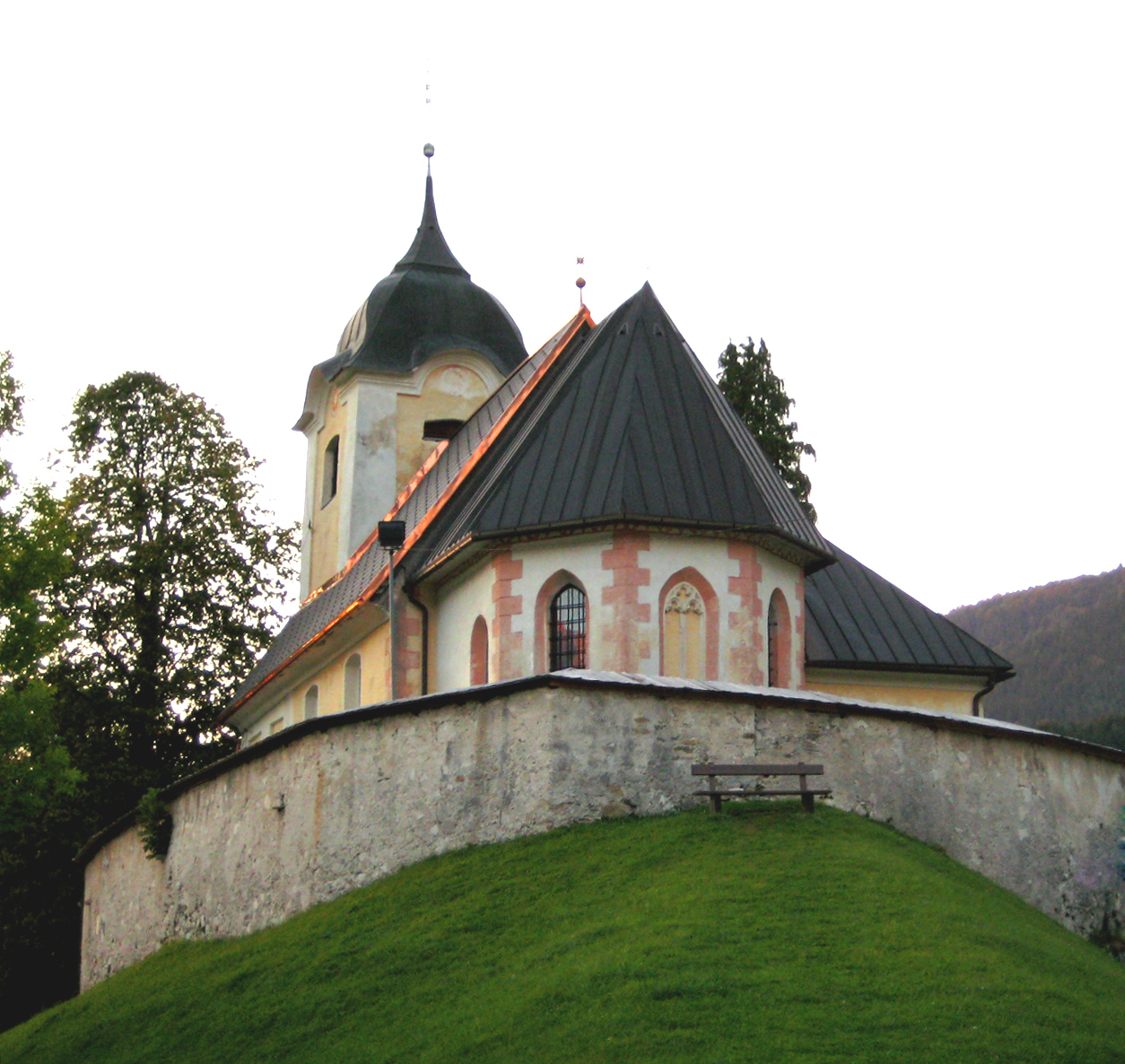
Holy Spirit Church

Other historic buildings include the late Gothic parish church dedicated to the Holy Spirit and an ethnographic museum in the Kajžnk House, a restored 19th-century farmhouse.

== Geography ==
Trebiža and Kravnjak creeks flow through the village. Their sources are on the slopes of Mount Peč (1,510 m) and Mount Petelinjek (1,552 m), constituting the extreme western part of the Karawanks range. Below the village and beside the main road from Jesenice to Tarvisio is the gravelly Ledine Basin, where Nadiža Creek disappears underground. The creek flows from the glacial Planica Valley. At times of heavy precipitation a small lake forms in Ledine, from which water filters through the gravel to rise again at Zelenci, a marshy wetland with an extraordinarily rich ecosystem, regarded as the permanent source of the Sava Dolinka River.

== Economy and tourism ==
The village is surrounded by fields, meadows, and pastures. Due to the harsh climate, the inhabitants are largely employed in livestock husbandry, relying on summer grazing in high pastures. Most local farmers are binational landowners, with meadows across the border in Italy.

Tourism is important to the economy, and there are many holiday homes in the area. Rateče is a starting point for hiking trips into the Julian Alps (through Tamar) and the Karawanks range. The lower Planica Valley hosts well-known ski-jumping competitions, where both the 100 meters (330 ft) and 200 meters (660 ft) benchmarks were first broken (in 1936 and 1994, respectively). Near the border crossing is the Macesnov'c ski area, with a 1,900 meters (6,200 ft) track.

Every year on 15 August a local event is held by the Rateče Tourist Association in the village square (in Gorica).

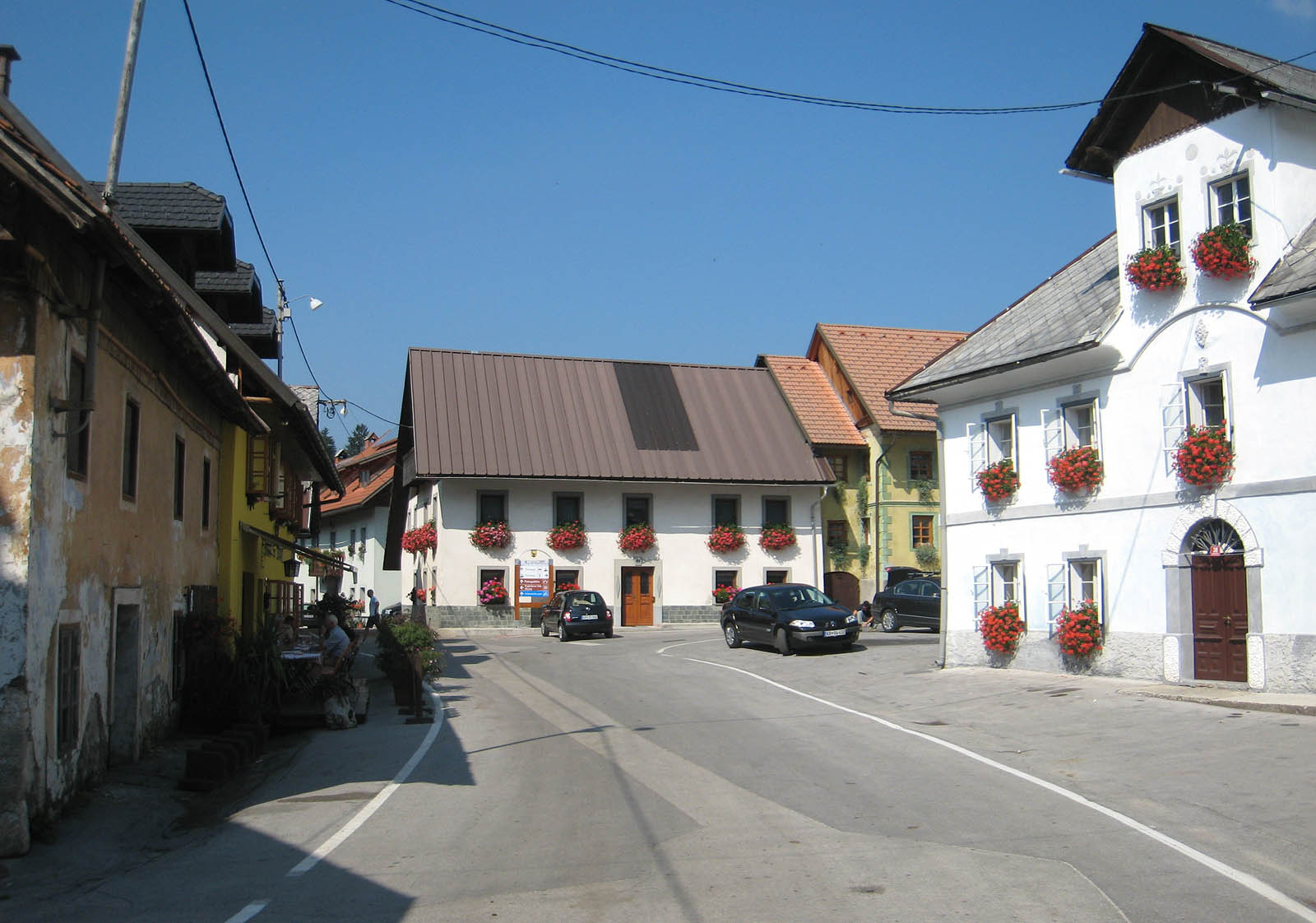
The centre of Rateče

== Climate ==
Rateče has a humid continental climate (Köppen Dfb).

Climate data for Rateče, 1991–2020 normals, extremes 1951–2020
Month	Jan	Feb	Mar	Apr	May	Jun	Jul	Aug	Sep	Oct	Nov	Dec	Year
Record high °C (°F)	14 (57)	18 (64)	21 (70)	26.3 (79.3)	29.3 (84.7)	35.5 (95.9)	36.3 (97.3)	35.8 (96.4)	28.9 (84.0)	24.8 (76.6)	20.1 (68.2)	13.5 (56.3)	36.3 (97.3)
Mean daily maximum °C (°F)	2.0 (35.6)	4.6 (40.3)	9.0 (48.2)	13.3 (55.9)	18.2 (64.8)	22.3 (72.1)	24.4 (75.9)	23.9 (75.0)	18.7 (65.7)	13.6 (56.5)	7.2 (45.0)	2.0 (35.6)	13.3 (55.9)
Daily mean °C (°F)	−3.2 (26.2)	−1.7 (28.9)	2.2 (36.0)	6.6 (43.9)	11.7 (53.1)	15.6 (60.1)	17.3 (63.1)	16.6 (61.9)	11.8 (53.2)	7.2 (45.0)	2.2 (36.0)	−2.7 (27.1)	7.0 (44.5)
Mean daily minimum °C (°F)	−7.1 (19.2)	−6.4 (20.5)	−2.9 (26.8)	0.9 (33.6)	5.3 (41.5)	9.2 (48.6)	10.8 (51.4)	10.8 (51.4)	6.8 (44.2)	2.9 (37.2)	−1.1 (30.0)	−6.1 (21.0)	1.9 (35.4)
Record low °C (°F)	−25.9 (−14.6)	−24.4 (−11.9)	−23.5 (−10.3)	−13.9 (7.0)	−10.5 (13.1)	−2.3 (27.9)	0.1 (32.2)	−0.7 (30.7)	−4.6 (23.7)	−12.6 (9.3)	−19.4 (−2.9)	−21.5 (−6.7)	−25.9 (−14.6)
Average precipitation mm (inches)	68 (2.7)	79 (3.1)	89 (3.5)	107 (4.2)	122 (4.8)	143 (5.6)	161 (6.3)	155 (6.1)	178 (7.0)	185 (7.3)	189 (7.4)	116 (4.6)	1,592 (62.6)
Average snowfall cm (inches)	40 (16)	56 (22)	35 (14)	18 (7.1)	0.5 (0.2)	0 (0)	0 (0)	0 (0)	0 (0)	5 (2.0)	27 (11)	53 (21)	234.5 (93.3)
Average extreme snow depth cm (inches)	24 (9.4)	34 (13)	22 (8.7)	3 (1.2)	0 (0)	0 (0)	0 (0)	0 (0)	0 (0)	0.3 (0.1)	3 (1.2)	16 (6.3)	34 (13)
Average precipitation days (≥ 0.1 mm)	9	9	11	14	16	16	15	14	12	12	13	10	151
Average snowy days (≥ 1 cm)	6	6	5	2	0.1	0	0	0	0	1	3	6	29.1
Mean monthly sunshine hours	91	116	160	164	189	209	235	225	175	140	81	62	1,847
Source: Slovenian Environment Agency (ARSO)
