= Sava Dolinka =

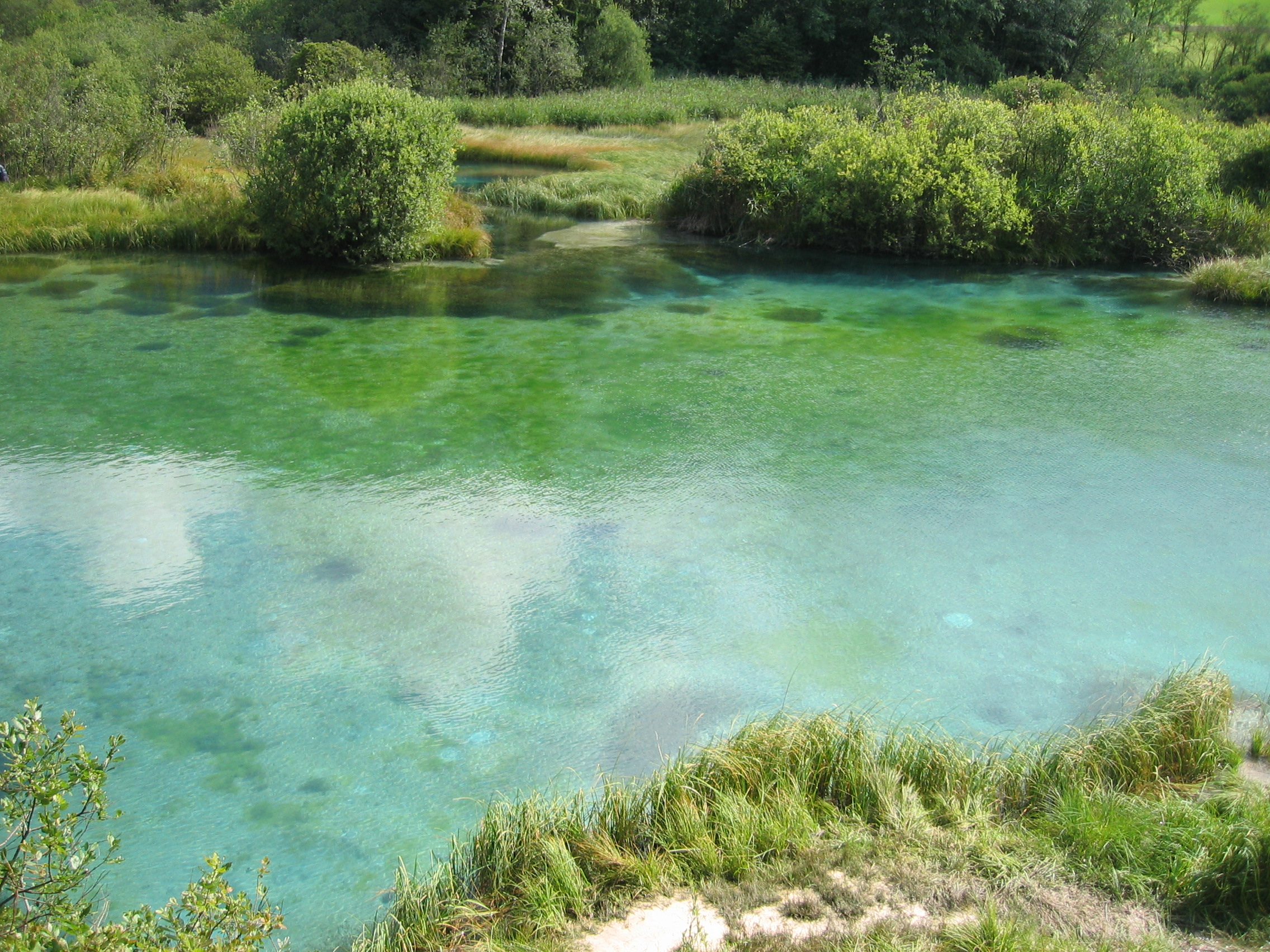
- Zelenci Springs, the source of the Sava Dolinka

Location
- Country: Slovenia

Physical characteristics
- Mouth
  - location: Sava
  - coordinates: 46.3442°N 14.1553°E
- Length: 45 km (28 mi)

Basin features
- Progression: Sava→ Danube→ Black Sea

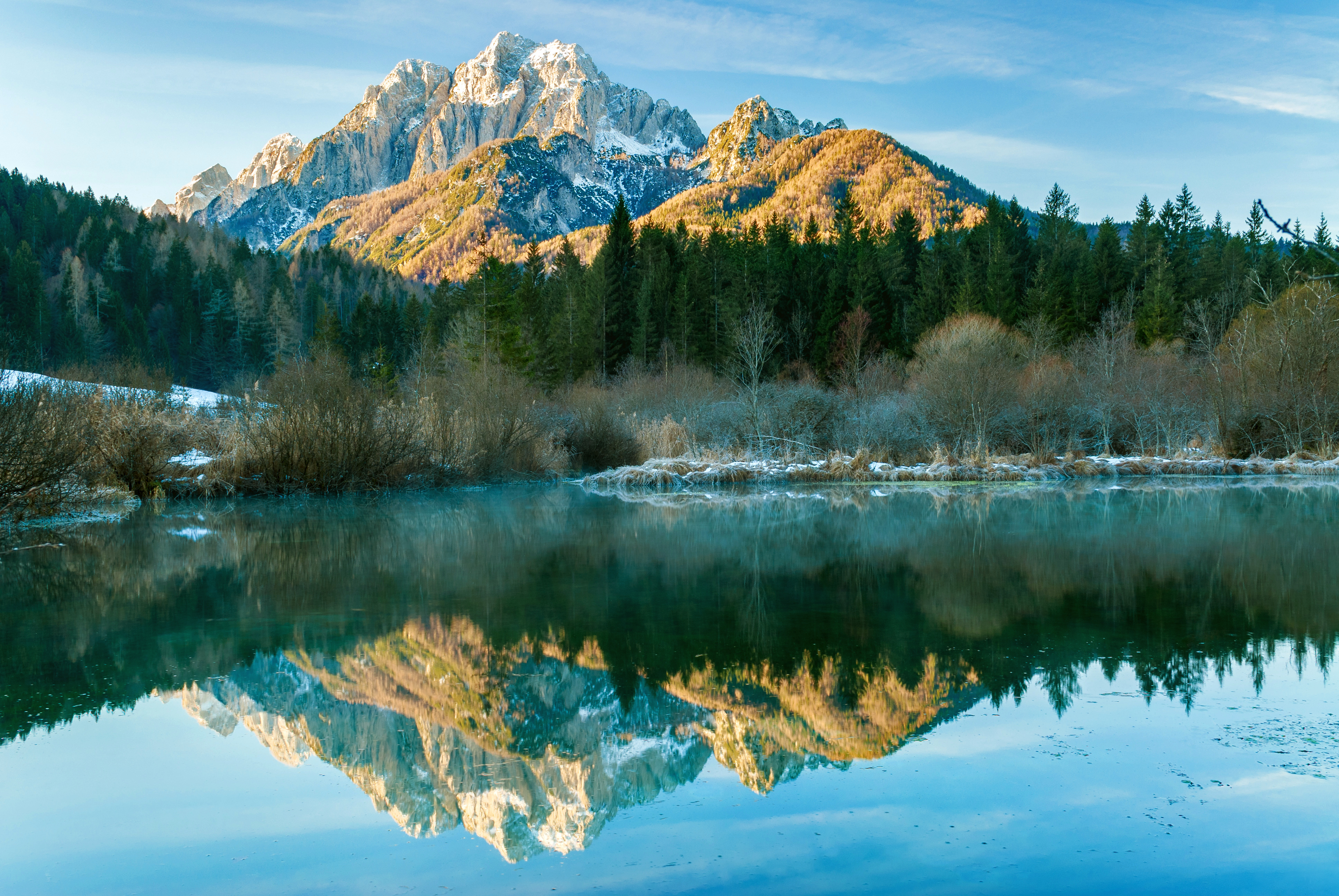
Zelenci in December 2015

The Sava Dolinka is a headwater of the Sava River in northwestern Slovenia. The 45-kilometer (28 mi) Sava Dolinka starts as Nadiža Creek in the Planica Valley below Mount Zadnja Ponca in the Julian Alps, at an elevation of 1,222 meters (4,009 ft), close to the Italian border. The stream goes underground soon after its source and breaks out again after 5 kilometers (3.1 mi) at an elevation of 842 meters (2,762 ft) in Zelenci, near Kranjska Gora. The Sava Dolinka flows through Kranjska Gora, Gozd–Martuljek, Jesenice, between Bled and Breg, and past the town of Lesce. The first in a series of hydroelectric power plants on the river, the Moste Hydro Power Plant (22.5 MW), is located near Žirovnica. It merges with the second major headwater of the Sava, the Sava Bohinjka, at Radovljica. Tributaries of the Sava Dolinka include the Triglav Bistrica at Mojstrana and the Radovna, which flows through the Vintgar Gorge near Bled.
