= List of museums in Slovenia =

This is a list of all museums, galleries, and museum collections in Slovenia that are open to the public, and in which professional care is taken of the material. They are recognized by "Slovenian Museums Association" and published in their Guide to Slovenian Museums and Galleries. The most recent version of this guide was published in 2008. All changes made afterward are noted in the table below.

== Museums and galleries recognized by "Slovenian Museums Association" ==
Slovenian name	English name	Location	Est.	Web	Collections
Muzej za arhitekturo in oblikovanje	Museum of architecture and design	Ljubljana	1972	www.mao.si	Architecture Museum of Ljubljana in Fužine Castle Arhitekturni muzej Ljubljana; Plečnik Collection in Plečnik House in Trnovo Plečnikova zbirka v Plečnikovi hiši
Belokranjski muzej Metlika	White Carniola Museum in Metlika	Metlika	1951	www.belokranjski-muzej.si	White Carniola Museum in Metlika Castle Belokranjski muzej Metlika; Kambič Gallery in Metlika Galerija Kambič; Oton Županičič Memorial Collection in Vinica Spominska zbirka Otona Župančiča; Local Museum Collection in Semič Krajevna muzejska zbirka Semič; Town Museum Collection in Črnomelj Mestna muzejska zbirka Črnomelj
Dolenjski muzej Novo mesto	Lower Carniola Museum in Novo Mesto	Novo Mesto	1950	https://www.dolenjskimuzej.si/si/	Lower Carniola Museum in Novo Mesto in Novo Mesto Dolenjski muzej Novo mesto; Jakac House in Novo Mesto Jakčev dom; Base 20 in Kočevski Rog Spomeniško območje Baza 20
Farmacevtsko-medicinska zbirka Bohuslava Lavičke	Bohuslav Lavička Pharmaceutical and Medical Collection	Ljubljana	1986	www.lek.si	--
Galerija Božidar Jakac, Kostanjevica na Krki	Božidar Jakac Art Museum, Kostanjevica na Krki	Kostanjevica na Krki	1974	www.galerija-bj.si	Božidar Jakac Art Museum Galerija Božidar Jakac; Lamut's Art Salon in Kostanjevica na Krki Lamutov likovni salon; Jože Gorjup Gallery in Kostanjevica na Krki primary school Gorjupova galerija v kostanjeviški osnovni šoli; Forma Viva Sculpture Park Park skulptur Forma viva
Galerija Murska Sobota	Murska Sobota Gallery	Murska Sobota		www.galerija-ms.si	--
Galerija-Muzej Lendava (Galéria-Múzeum Lendva)	Lendava Gallery-Museum	Lendava	1973	www.gml.si	Museum and Castle Gallery in Lendava Castle Galerija-Muzej Lendava; Citizenship, Typography and Umbrella Manufacturing in Lendava Meščanstvo, tiskarstvo in dežnikarstvo Lendave
Galerija Velenje	Velenje Gallery	Velenje	1976	www.galerijavelenje.si	Modern Slovenian Art - Permanent Gorenje Collection in Velenje Castle Stalna zbirka slovenskega slikarstva - Gorenje; Lojze Perko Collection in Velenje Castle Zbirka Lojzeta Perka
Gorenjski muzej Kranj	Gorenjska Museum	Kranj	1963	www.gorenjski-muzej.si	Kieselstein Castle Grad Kieselstein; Town Hall Mestna hiša Kranj; Prešeren House in Kranj Prešernova hiša; Charnel House in Kranj Kostnica; Prešeren's Birth House in Vrba Prešernova rojstna hiša; Finžgar Birth House in Doslovče Finžgarjeva rojstna hiša; Tomaž Godec Museum in Bohinjska Bistrica Muzej Tomaža Godca; Oplen House at Studor Oplenova hiša; Alpine Dairy Farming Museum in Stara Fužina Planšarski muzej
Goriški muzej	Gorica Museum	Kromberk	1952	www.goriskimuzej.si	Gorica Museum in Kromberk Castle Goriški muzej; Bartolomei Vila in Solkan Vila Bartolomei; Border-line in the Goriška region 1945 - 2004 in Nova Gorica railway station Muzejska zbirka Kolodvor; Military Watchtowers in Vrtojba Vojaški stražarski stolp; Zoran Mušič Gallery in Dobrovo Castle Galerija Zorana Mušiča; Ajdovščina Museum Collection in Ajdovščina Muzejska zbirka Ajdovščina; First World War Museum Collection on Sveta Gora Muzej 1. svetovne vojne; Alojz Gradnik Memorial House in Medana Spominska hiša Alojza Gradnika
Gornjesavski muzej Jesenice	Upper Sava Museum, Jesenice	Jesenice	1954	www.gornjesavskimuzej.si	Ironworking and Palaeontological Collection in Bucelleni-Ruard Manor, Jesenice Železarska in paleontološka zbirka v Ruardovi graščini; Ethnological Collection in Kasarna, Jesenice Etnološka zbirka v Kasarni; Kos Manor in Jesenice Kosova graščina; ~~Triglav Museum Collection, Mojstrana~~ since 2010 Slovenian Alpine Museum; Slovenian Alpine Museum in Mojstrana Slovenski planinski muzej; Liznjek Farm in Kranjska Gora Liznjekova domačija; Kajžnik House in Rateče Kajžnikova hiša
Javni zavod za kulturo Litja, OE Muzej	The museum of the Litija Public Institute of Culture	Litija	2006	www.jzk.si	--
Kobariški muzej	Kobarid Museum	Kobarid	1990	www.kobariski-muzej.si	--
Koroška galerija likovnih umetnosti	Carinthian Gallery of Fine Arts	Slovenj Gradec	1957	www.glu-sg.si	Carinthian Gallery of Fine Arts in Slovenj Gradec Koroška galerija likovnih umetnosti; Open-Air Gallery - Štibuh Park and Old Town Centre in Slovenj Gradec Galerija na prostem - park na Štibuhu in staro mesto
Koroški pokrajinski muzej	Carinthian Regional Museum	Slovenj Gradec	1951	www.kpm.si	Carinthian Region Archaeology in Slovenj Gradec Arheologija koroške krajine; Church of St. George in Legen Cerkev svetega Jurija; Pauček Partisan Hospitals in Legen Paučkove partizanske bolnišnice; Counts Andeški and Slovenj Gradec at Grad nad Starim trgom Grofje Andeški in Slovenj Gradec; Gestapo Prisons in Dravograd Gestapovski zapori; Dravograd, where the roads meet in Dravograd Dravograd na stičišču poti; Carinthian Plebiscite Museum in Libeliče Muzejska zbirka Koroški plebiscit; Food Culture of Inhabitants of Libeliče and its Surroundings in Libeliče Prehrambena kultura prebivalcev Libelič in okolice; Peasant Collection in Libeliče Kmečka zbirka; Hammer collection of Ferdinand Leitinger in Radlje Castle, Radlje ob Dravi Zbirka kladiv Ferdinanda Leitingerja; Open-Air Forma Viva (Kotlje, Ravne na Koroškem, Poljana, Mežica and Črna na Koroškem) Forma Viva; Mining Collection in Črna na Koroškem Rudarska zbirka; Ethnographical Collection in Črna na Koroškem Etnografska zbirka; Museum of stonecutting, glassmaking and forestry in Josipdol Muzej kamnoseštva, steklarstva in gozdarstva; Smokehouse in Libeliče Dimnica (črna kuhinja); Lapidary in Ravne castle Lapidarij v kapeli gradu Ravne; Open-Air Objects (Ravne na Koroškem); Prežih Cottage - Prežihov Voranc Memorial Museum in Kotlje Prežihova bajta
Kozjanski park	Kozjansko Park	Podsreda		kozjanski-park.si	Podsreda Castle at Podsreda Grad Podsreda; Pillory Pranger; Church of St. John the Baptist in Podsreda Cerkev sv. Janeza Krstnika; Slovenian Bavarian-House in Podsreda Slovensko-bavarska hiša; Levstik Mill in Podsreda Levstikov mlin; Javeršek Farm in Podsreda Javerškova domačija; Kolar Farm in Trebče Kolarjeva domačija
Loški muzej Škofja Loka	Loka Museum in Škofja Loka	Škofja Loka	1939	www.loski-muzej.si	Loka Museum in Škofja Loka Castle Loški muzej; Ivan Grohar Gallery in Škofja Loka Galerija Ivana Groharja; France Mihelič Gallery in Škofja Loka Galerija Franceta Miheliča; Cankar Battalion House in Dražgoše Spominska soba Cankarjevega bataljona
Mednarodni grafični likovni center	International Center of Graphic Arts	Ljubljana	1986	www.mglc-lj.si	--
Medobčinski muzej Kamnik	Kamnik Intermunicipal Museum	Kamnik	1961	www.muzej-kamnik-on.net	Kamnik Intermunicipal Museum in Zaprice Castle, Kamnik Medobčinski muzej Kamnik; Miha Maleš Gallery in Kamnik Galerija Miha Maleš
Mestna galerija Ljubljana	Ljubljana City Art Museum	Ljubljana	1963	https://mgml.si/sl/mestna-galerija/	Ljubljana City Art Museum in its original building at Mestni trg 5 Mestna galerija 1; Gallery's permanent collection at Cankarjevo nabrežje 11/I Mestna galerija 2; Bežigrad Gallery 1 at Dunajska 31 Bežigrajska galerija 1; Bežigrad Gallery 2 at Vodovodna 3 Bežigrajska galerija 2
Mestni muzej Idrija (muzej za Idrijsko in Cerkljansko)	Idrija Municipal Museum	Idrija	1953	www.muzej-idrija-cerkno.si	Idrija Municipal Museum in Gewerkenegg Castle, Idrija Mestni muzej Idrija; Miner's House (Ethnological Collection) in Idrija Rudarska hiša (etnološka zbirka); Francis' Shaft (Collection of Renovated Mining Machinery and Instruments) in Idrija Jašek Frančiške; Idrija Kamšt (Pumping Machine Used in Mining from 1790) in Idrija Idrijska kamšt; Slovenija Partisan Printing House in Vojsko Partizanska tiskarna Slovenija; Cerkno Museum in Cerkno Cerkljanski muzej; France Bevk Farm in Zakojca Domačija Franceta Bevka; Franja Partisan Hospital at Dolenji Novaki pri Cerknem Partizanska bolnica Franja
Mestni muzej Ljubljana	City Museum of Ljubljana	Ljubljana	1935	www.mestnimuzej.si	Ljubljana City Museum in Turjak Palace, Ljubljana Mestni muzej Ljubljana v Turjaški palači; Shield (conservatory centre) Ščit (konservatorsko središče Mestnega muzeja Ljubljana); Match Gallery in Ljubljana Galerija Vžigalica; Archaeological Park Early Christian Centre in Ljubljana Arheološki park Zgodnjekrščansko središče; Archaeological Park Emonian House in Ljubljana Arheološki park Emonska hiša; Ivan Cankar Memorial Room at Rožnik Spominska soba Ivana Cankarja; Tobacco Museum in Ljubljana Tobačni muzej
Mestni muzej Mengeš	Mengeš Town Museum	Mengeš	1995	www.muzej-menges.si	Old Beadle's House (Franc Jelovšek Birth House) in Mengeš Stara mežnarija - rojstna hiša Franca Jelovška; Beadle's House Gallery in Mengeš Galerija Mežnarija
Moderna galerija	Museum of Modern Art	Ljubljana	1947	www.mg-lj.si	Museum of Modern Art in Ljubljana Muzej moderne umetnosti; Small Gallery in Ljubljana Mala galerija; Museum of Contemporary Art on Metelkova Muzej sodobne umetnosti na Metelkovi
Muzej krščanstva na Slovenskem	Slovenian Museum of Christianity	Stična (Ivančna Gorica municipality)	1991	www.mks-sticna.si	--
Miklova Hiša - muzej, galerija	Mikl House - Museum, Gallery	Ribnica	1961	www.miklovahisa.si/muzej www.miklovahisa.si/galerija	Mikl House Museum in Ribnica Castle, Ribnica Miklova Hiša muzej; Mikl House Gallery Miklova Hiša galerija
Muzej na prostem Rogatec	Rogatec Open-Air Museum	Rogatec	1981	www.muzej-rogatec.si/	--
Muzej narodne osvoboditve Maribor	Maribor National Liberation Museum	Maribor	1958	www.muzejno-mb.si	Maribor National Liberation Museum in Maribor Muzej narodne osvoboditve Maribor; Photography Museum with Bohanc Camera Collection in Maribor Fotografski muzej z Bohančevo zbirko fotoaparatov; Partisan Pohorje Collection at Osankarica Razstava Partizansko Pohorje; Zidanšek Pohorje Brigade Exhibition (Saint Primus Primary School Pohorje) at Sveti Primož na Pohorju Zidanškova razstava – Pohorska brigada; Ribnica Through Time in Ribnica na Pohorju elementary school Ribnica skozi čas
Muzej novejše zgodovine Celje	Celje Museum of Recent History	Celje	1951	www.muzej-nz-ce.si	Celje Museum of Recent History Muzej novejše zgodovine Celje; Children Museum - Herman's Den Otroški muzej - Hermanov brlog; "Old Pot" - Memorial place for victims of Nazi violence Stari pisker - spominski prostor žrtev nacističnega nasilja; Josip Pelikan Photography Studios Fotografski atelje Josipa Pelikana
Muzej novejše zgodovine Slovenije	National Museum of Contemporary History	Ljubljana	1951	www.muzej-nz.si/en/	National Museum of Contemporary History in Cekin Castle, Ljubljana; Brestanica Unit in Castle Rajhenburg, Brestanica Enota Brestanica v gradu Rajhenburg
Muzej premogovništva Slovenije	Coal Mining Museum of Slovenia	Velenje	1957	muzej.rlv.si	--
Muzej slovenske policije	Slovenian Police Museum	Tacen	1947	www.policija.si	Slovenian Police Museum in Police Academy Tacen
Muzej športa, Ljubljana	Sports Museum	Ljubljana	2000	muzejsporta.si	--
Muzej Velenje	Velenje Museum	Velenje	1957	www.muzej-velenje.si	Velenje Museum in Velenje Castle Muzej Velenje; Museum of the Leather Industry in Slovenia in Šoštanj (since 2009) Muzej usnjarstva na Slovenskem; Kavčnik Farm in Zavodnje Kavčnikova domačija; Gril Farm in Lipje (since 2010) Grilova domačija; Memorial Room where partial German Capitulation was signed on 9th May 1945 in Topolšica Spominska soba podpisa delne nemške kapitulacije v Topolščici 9.maja 1945; Graška Gora Memorial Room in Graška Gora Spominska soba na Graški gori
Muzej Vrbovec (Muzej gozdarstva in lesarstva)	Vrbovec Museum (Museum of Forestry and Timber Industry)	Nazarje	2001	www.muzej-vrbovec.si	--
Muzej Železniki	Železniki Museum	Železniki	1969	www.zelezniki.si	--
Muzeji radovljiške občine	Radovljica Municipality Museums	Radovljica	1974	www.muzeji-radovljica.si	Apiculture Museum in Radovljica Čebelarski muzej; Town Museum in Radovljica Mestni muzej; Šivec House Gallery in Radovljica Galerija Šivčeva hiša; Smithery Museum in Kropa Kovaški muzej; Hostage Museum in Kacenštajn Castle, Begunje na Gorenjskem Muzej talcev
Narodna galerija	National Gallery of Slovenia	Ljubljana	1918	www.ng-slo.si	--
Narodni muzej Slovenije	National Museum of Slovenia	Ljubljana	1921	www.nms.si	National Museum of Slovenia - building on Prešeren Street and Metelko Street in Ljubljana Narodni muzej Slovenije; Bled Castle Collection Zbirka na blejskim gradu; Snežnik Castle Collection Zbirka na gradu Snežnik; Archaeological Collection in Hrušica (near Podkraj) Arheološka zbirka
Notranjski muzej Postojna	Inner Carniola Museum, Postojna	Postojna	1947	www.notranjski-muzej.si	Notranjska Museum Postojna in Postojna Notranjski muzej Postojna; Kravanja House in Cerknica Kravanjeva hiša; Iron Forge in Grahovo Fužina v Grahovem
Obalne galerije Piran	Littoral Galleries, Piran	Piran	1976	www.obalne-galerije.si	City Gallery in Piran Mestna galerija; Herman Pečarič Gallery in Piran Galerija Herman Pečarič; Loža Gallery in Koper Galerija Loža; Meduza Gallery 1 in Piran Galerija Meduza 1; Meduza Gallery 2 in Koper Galerija Meduza 2; Forma Viva - Open Air Stone Sculpture Collection in Seča at Portorož Forma Viva; A+A Gallery in Venice, Italy Galerija A+A
Pilonova galerija Ajdovščina	Pilon Gallery Ajdovščina	Ajdovščina	1973	www.venopilon.com	--
Podzemlje Pece (rudnik svinca in cinka Mežica kot turistični rudnik in muzej)	Peca Underground (Mežica Lead and Zinc Mine as Tourist Mine and Museum)	Mežica	1995	www.podzemljepece.com	--
Pokrajinski muzej Celje	Celje Regional Museum	Celje	1882	www.pokmuz-ce.si	Celje Regional Museum in "Old County" in Celje Pokrajinski muzej Celje v "Stari grofiji"; Potok Cave Potočka zijalka; Firšt Gallery in the Logar Valley Razstavišče Firšt; Gornji Grad Museum Collection in Gornji Grad Muzejska zbirka Gornji Grad; Schwentner House - Vransko Museum Collection Schwentnerjeva hiša - Muzejska zbirka Vransko; Risto Savin Birth House in Žalec; Leber Carriage Depot - Dobrna Museum Collection Depo kočije Leber - Muzejska zbirka Dobrna; Rifnik and its Treasures - Šentjur Museum Collection Rifnik in njegovi zakladi - Muzejska zbirka Šentjur; Šmid Ethnological Collection - Planina Museum Collection Etnološka zbirka Šmid - Muzejska zbirka Planina pri Sevnici; Glassworks in the Žusma Region Glažute na območju Žusma; Glassworks Church - Church of St. Leopold in Loka pri Žusmu Glažutarska cerkvica - Cerkev sv. Leopolda; Archaeological park Roman Necropolis in Šempeter v Savinjski dolini Arheološki park Rimska nekropola; Archaeological park Old Christian Complex in Rifnik Arheološki park Starokrščanski kompleks
Pokrajinski muzej Kočevje	Kočevje Regional Museum	Kočevje	1953	www.pmk-kocevje.si	Kočevje Regional Museum in Šešek House, Kočevje Pokrajinski muzej Kočevje v Šeškovem domu; Cultural House Predgrad in Predgrad Kulturni dom Predgrad
Pokrajinski muzej Koper	Koper Regional Museum	Koper	1911	www.pmk-kp.si	Koper Regional Museum in Belgramoni-Taco Palace, Koper Pokrajinski muzej Koper v Palači Belgramoni Tacco; New History Department in Koper Oddelek novejše zgodovine; Museum Gallery in Koper Muzejska galerija; Ethnological Department in Koper Etnološki oddelek; Tartini Memorial Room in Piran Tartinijeva spominska soba
Pokrajinski muzej Maribor	Maribor Regional Museum	Maribor	1903	www.pmuzej-mb.si	--
Pokrajinski muzej Murska Sobota	Murska Sobota Regional Museum	Murska Sobota	1955	www.pok-muzej-ms.si	Murska Sobota Regional Museum in Murska Sobota Castle, Murska Sobota Pokrajinski muzej Murska Sobota; Radgona Bridges - Museum Collection in "Špital", Gornja Radgona Radgonski mostovi; History of Health-Care in Pomurje - Museum Collection in Beltinci Castle, Beltinci Zgodovina zdravstva v Pomurju; Radenska Museum - Radenska Museum Collection in Radenci Muzej Radenske - muzejska zbirka Radenske; Oloris - Archaeological Collection (Lendava Gallery-Museum) in Lendava Oloris - arheološka zbirka (Galerija-Muzej Lendava)
Pokrajinski muzej Ptuj-Ormož (changed name since 2009)	Ptuj Ormož Regional Museum	Ptuj	1963	www.muzej-ptuj-ormoz.si	Ptuj-Ormož Regional museum in Ptuj Castle, Ptuj Pokrajinski muzej Ptuj Ormož; Former Dominican Cloister in Ptuj Nekdanji domonikanski samostan; Old Prisons in Ptuj Stari zapori; Povoden Museum in Ptuj Povodnov muzej; Orpheus Monument in Ptuj Orfejev spomenik; Roman Brickworks Kiln in Ptuj Rimska opekarska peč; First Mithraeum in Ptuj I. Mitrej; Third Mithraeum in Spodnja Hajdina III. Mitrej; Castle Ormož in Ormož (added in 2009) Grad Ormož; Castle Velika Nedelja in Velika Nedelja (added in 2009) Grad Velika Nedelja; Mihelič gallery (added in 2009) in Ptuj Miheličeva galerija
Pomorski muzej Sergej Mašera Piran (Museo del mare Sergej Mašera Pirano)	Sergej Mašera Maritime Museum Piran	Piran	1954	www2.arnes.si/~kppomm	Maritime Museum in Piran Pomorski muzej Sergej Mašera Piran; "Sea Gull" Sea Boat in Piran Jadrnica "Galeb"; Naval Collection in St. Mark Villa in Portorož Pomorska zbirka v Vili sv. Marka; Tona House - Ethnological Collection in Sveti Peter Tonina hiša - etnološka zbirka; Salt-Making Museum in Sečovlje Salina Nature Park Muzej solinarstva; Street Museum in Izola Ulični muzej; Ship Modeling Collection in Izola Zbirka ladijskega modelarstva
Posavski muzej Brežice	Lower Sava Valley Museum in Brežice	Brežice	1949	www.posavski-muzej.si	--
Prirodoslovni muzej Slovenije	Slovenian Museum of Natural History	Ljubljana	1821	www2.pms-lj.si	Slovenian Museum of Natural History in Ljubljana Prirodoslovni muzej Slovenije; Juliana Alpine Botanical Garden in Trenta Alpski botanični vrt Julijana
Slovenska kinoteka	Slovenian Cinematheque	Ljubljana	1996	www.kinoteka.si	Slovenian Cinematheque Hall in Ljubljana Dvorana Slovenske Kinoteke; Ita Rina in Škrateljn House in Divača Ita Rina v Škrateljnovi hiši
Slovenski etnografski muzej	Slovenian Ethnographic Museum	Ljubljana	1923	www.etno-muzej.si	--
Slovenski gasilski muzej dr. Branka Božiča	Branko Božič Slovenian Firefighter's Museum	Metlika	1969	www.metlika.si	--
Slovenski gledališki muzej	Slovenian National Theatre Museum	Ljubljana	1952	www.gledaliski-muzej.si	--
Slovenski šolski muzej	Slovenian School Museum	Ljubljana	1898	www.ssolski-muzej.si	--
Splošna knjižnica Ljutomer - OE Muzej	Ljutomer General Library - Museum	Ljutomer	1981	www.knjiznica-ljutomer.si	--
Tehniški muzej Slovenije	Slovenian Technical Museum	Bistra	1951	www.tms.si	Slovenian Technical Museum in Bistra Tehniški muzej Slovenije; Post and Telecommunication Museum in Polhov Gradec Castle, Polhov Gradec Muzej pošte in telekomunikacij Slovenije; Valvasor Graphic Workshop (Bogenšperk Public Institution) in Bogenšperk Castle, Bogenšperk Valvazorjeva grafična delavnica; Open-storage Depot in Soteska Ogledni depo
Tolminski muzej	Tolmin Museum	Tolmin	1950	www.tol-muzej.si	Tolmin Museum in Coronini Manor, Tolmin Tolminski muzej; Simon Gregorčič Birth House in Vrsno Rojstna hiša Simona Gregorčiča; Ciril Kosmač Farm in Slap ob Idrijici Domačija Cirila Kosmača; Archaeological Museum Most na Soči in Most na Soči Arheološki muzej Most na Soči; Museum Collection Podbrdo in Podbrdo Muzejska zbirka Podbrdo; Exhibition "Behind the Twilight of Centuries" in Kluže Fort at Bovec Razstava "Izza somraka stoletij" v trdnjavi Kluže; Permanent Exhibition of Jaka Čop Photographs in Old village Centre - Breginj Stalna razstava fotografij Jake Čopa; Stergulc House in Bovec (since 2009) Stergulčeva hiša; Jakovka House in Podbrdo (since 2008) Jakovkna hiša
Tržiški muzej	Tržič Museum	Tržič	1952	www.trziski-muzej.si	Tržič Museum in Pollak Hut, Tržič Tržiški muzej v Pollakovi kajži; Kurnik House in Tržič Kurnikova hiša; Partisan Technique of Kokrška Detachment above the Dovžan Gorge Partizanska tehnika Kokrškega odreda; Germovka (forge) in Tržič Germovka (kovačija)
Umetnostna galerija Maribor	Maribor Art Gallery	Maribor	1954	www.umetnostnagalerija.si	Maribor Art Gallery in Maribor Umetnostna galerija Maribor; Rotovž Exhibition Salon in Maribor Razstavi salon Rotovž
Vojaški muzej Slovenske vojske	Military Museum of Slovenian Armed Forces	Maribor	2004	www.vojaskimuzej.si	Military Museum of Slovenian Armed Forces in Military Academy, Maribor (transferred from Ljubljana in 2009) Vojaški muzej Slovenske vojske v kadetnici Maribor; Pivka Park of Military History in Pivka Park vojaške zgodovine
Zasavski muzej Trbovlje	Central Sava Valley Museum	Trbovlje	1986	www.zasavskimuzejtrbovlje.si	Central Sava Valley Museum Zasavski muzej Trbovlje; Miner's Dwellings on Njiva in Trbovlje Rudarski satnovanji na Njivi; Ethnologic Trail through Mining Colonies in Trbovlje Etnološka pot po rudarskih kolonijah; Memorial House of the Founding Congress of the Communist Party of Slovenia in Čebine Hiša ustanovnega kongresa KPS; Hrastnik Museum Collections in Hrastnik Muzejske zbirke Hrastnik
Zavod Celeia Celje - Center sodobnih umetnosti	Celeia Institute - Centre for Contemporary Arts	Celje		www.celeia.info	Centre for Contemporary Arts in Celje Center sodobnih umetnosti; Modern Art Gallery in Celje Galerija sodobne umetnosti; Fine Arts Salon Celje in Celje Likovni salon; Račka Gallery in Celje Galerija Račka
Zemljepisni muzej Slovenije GIAM ZRC SAZU	Slovene Geographical Museum GIAM ZRC SAZU	Ljubljana	1946	giam.zrc-sazu.si	--
Zgodovinski arhiv in muzej Univerze v Ljubljani	University of Ljubljana Historical Archives and Museum	Ljubljana		www.uni-lj.si	--
Železniški muzej Slovenskih železnic	Slovenian Railway Museum	Ljubljana		www.burger.si and www.slo-zeleznice.si	--

== Other museums and galleries ==
Slovenian name	English name	Location	Est.	Web
Čebelarski muzej Krapje	Apiculture Museum Krapje	Krapje	1997	www.cebelarski-muzej.si
Galerija Avgusta Černigoja	Avgust Černigoj Gallery	Lipica		www.lipica.org
Baragov dom	Baraga House	Knežja vas at Dobrnič		
Rojstna hiša Huga Wolfa	Birthplace of Hugo Wolf	Slovenj Gradec		www.slovenj-gradec.si
Rojstna hiša Janeza Jalna	Birthplace of Janez Jalen	Rodine		www.zirovnica.eu
Rojstna hiša Matije Čopa	Birthplace of Matija Čop	Žirovnica		www.zirovnica.eu
Kovaški muzej, Razkrižje	Blacksmith Museum, Razkrižje	Razkrižje	1997	www.jeruzalem.si
Pivovarski muzej	Brewery Museum	Ljubljana	1986	www.pivo-union.si
Časarov mlin	Časar Mill	Prosenjakovci	1999	www.casarov-mlin.com
Železna jama in zbirka v jamarskem domu	Cave Železna jama and Caving Collection	Gorjuša	1963	www.burger.si
Galerija DLUM	DLUM Gallery	Maribor		
Dominkova domačija	Dominko Farm	Gorišnica	1998	www.dedi.si
Spominska soba dr Frana Miklošiča	Franz Miklosich Memorial Room	Radomerščak		
Etnološka zbirka kmečkega orodja	Ethnological Collection of Agricultural Implements	Sveti Jurij ob Ščavnici		www.td-svetijurij.si
Mestna galerija Franc Riemer	Franc Riemer Municipal Gallery	Slovenske Konjice	1994	
Plinarniški muzej	Gasworks Museum	Ljubljana	1996	www.jh-lj.si
Grubelnikova zbirka	Grubelnik Collection	Ribnica na Pohorju	1987	
Domačija Miška Kranjca	Miško Kranjec Farm	Velika Polana	1964	www.velika-polana.si
Homogea (Stalna zbirka Lovci na mamute)	Homogea (Permanent collection Mammoth Hunters)	Tržič		
Ekomuzej hmeljarstva in pivovarstva Slovenije	Eco-Museum of Hop-Growing and Brewing Industry in Slovenia	Žalec	2009	www.ekomuzej-hmelj.si
Splavarski muzej Javnik	Javnik Wood Rafting Museum	Javnik	2001	www.dravski-splavarji.com
Sadnikarjeva muzejska zbirka	Josip Nikolaj Sadnikar Collection	Kamnik	1893	www.kks-kamnik.si/sadnikar
Spominska soba Jožeta Lacka	Jože Lacko Memorial Room	Ptuj		
Muzej Jezerski hram	Lake Shed Museum	Cerknica	1992	www.jezerski-hram.si
Muzej Laško	Laško Museum	Laško	1907	www.stik-lasko.si
Levstikov dom (Spominski sobi Frana Levstika in Josipa Stritarja)	Levstik House (Memorial Rooms of Fran Levstik and Josip Stritar)	Velike Lašče	1986	www.trubarjevi-kraji.si
Muzejska zbirka LGL - Lutkovna zapuščina Milana Klemenčiča	Ljubljana Puppet Theatre Museum Collection	Ljubljana	1990	www.lgl.si
Galerija Lojzeta Spacala	Lojze Spacal Gallery and the Karst House	Štanjel	1988	www.goriskimuzej.si/stanjel.html
Kraška hiša	Karst House	Štanjel		www.goriskimuzej.si/stanjel.html
Etnografska zbirka Marije Sušnik	Marija Sušnik Ethnographic Collection	Bizeljsko	1997	www.bizeljsko.com
Spominska soba generala Rudolfa Maistra	Memorial Room of General Rudolf Maister, a.k.a. Vojanov	Zavrh	1984	
Muzej medicine v okviru Inštituta za zgodovino medicine, Univerza v Ljubljana	Museum of Medicine, Institute for the History of Medicine	Ljubljana	1945	www.mf.uni-lj.si
Kovaški in gasilski muzej	Muta Forge Museum	Muta	1973	www.kpm.si
Domačija Petra Dajnka	Peter Dajnko Farm	Črešnjevci	2003	www.tic-radgona.si
Muzej na prostem Kartuzija Pleterje	Pleterje Charterhouse Open Air Museum	Drča		www.sentjernej.si
Pleteršnikova domačija	Pleteršnik Farm	Pišece	1994	
Pocarjeva domačija	Pocar Farm	Zgornja Radovna	1999	www.tnp.si
Kovaški muzej Podgoršek	Podgoršek Blacksmith's Museum	Pišece	1993	
Predjamski grad	Predjama Castle	Postojna		www.turizem-kras.si
Muzej Ralo	Ralo Museum	Ljutomer	1998	www.jeruzalem.si
Čevljarski muzej	Shoemaker's Museum	Turnišče	1979	www.turnisce.si
Škrabčeva domačija	Škrabec Farm	Hrovača	2002	www.skrabceva-domacija.com
Slomškova soba	Slomšek Room	Vuzenica	1999	www.vuzenica.eu
Grad Slovenska Bistrica	Slovenska Bistrica Castle	Slovenska Bistrica		www.zavod-ksb.si/ANG/castle.html
Sokličev muzej	Soklič Museum	Slovenj Gradec	1937	www.kpm.si
Etnološko-zgodovinska zbirka Stražna krajina	Stražna Krajina Ethnological and Historical Collection	Krplivnik	1997	
Vojaški muzej Tabor	Tabor Military Museum	Lokev	1995	www.kras-carso.com/muzej/tabor
Galerija likovnih samorastnikov Trebnje	Trebnje Gallery of Naïve Artists	Trebnje	1971	www.galerijatrebnje.si/en
Dom Trenta	Trenta Lodge TNP Information Centre and Museum	Trenta	1953	www.tnp.si
Trubarjeva domačija	Trubar Farm	Velike Lašce	1986	www.trubarjevi-kraji.si
Galerija ZDSLU	Union of Slovene Fine Arts Associations (ZDSLU) Gallery	Ljubljana		www.dlul-drustvo.si
Spominski dom na Vaneči	Vaneča Memorial Room	Vaneča	1984	
Foto muzej Vlastja	Vlastja Photographic Museum	Gorenja vas	1991	
Muzej motociklov Vransko	Vransko Motorcycle Museum	Vransko	1997	www.muzej-motociklov.com
Vojni muzej	War Museum	Logatec	1998	logatec.si
Zavod za kulturo, šport in turizem Žalec	Žalec Institution for Culture, Sport and Tourism	Žalec	1992	www.zkst-zalec.si/kultura
Muzej Žiri	Žiri Museum	Žiri	1970	www.lto-blegos.si
Dvorec Strmol	Strmol Mansion	Rogatec		
Grad Ravne	Ravne Castle	Ravne na Koroškem		
Sinagoga Maribor	Maribor Synagogue	Maribor	2001	www.pmuzej-mb.si
Sinagoga Lendava	Lendava Synagogue	Maribor	1994	
Muzej na prostem Račji dvor	Račji Dvor Open-Air Museum	Maribor		

== Sources ==
- Jana Šubic Prislan; Elizabeta Petruša-Štrukelj; Metka Fujs (2008). Guide to Slovenian Museums and Galleries. Ljubljana: Skupnost muzejev Slovenije. ISBN 978-961-91125-3-3.
- Jana Šubic Prislan; Elizabeta Petruša-Štrukelj; Metka Fujs (2008). Vodnik po Slovenskih muzejih in galerijah (in Slovenian). Ljubljana: Skupnost muzejev Slovenije. ISBN 978-961-91125-2-6.
- "Slovenia Cultural Profile (Museums in Slovenia)". the Ministry of Culture of Slovenia and the British Council Slovenia in co-operation with the Ministry of Foreign Affairs of Slovenia and the Government Communication Office of Slovenia. Archived from the original on 16 November 2010.
