= Drca =

Drca or DRCA may refer to:

- Distal right coronary artery, one of several coronary arteries.
- Drča (pronounced [ˈdəɾtʃa]) a village in the foothills of the Gorjanci Mountains in Slovenia
- sr:Drča, Serbian family name
  - Luka Drča Serbian basketball player
- Dutch Reformed Church in Africa, former denomination
