= Oslešica =

- Location in Slovenia
- Coordinates: 46°08′33″N 15°31′09″E
- Country: Slovenia
- Traditional region: Styria
- Statistical region: Savinja
- Municipality: Šentjur
- Elevation: 360 m (1,180 ft)

Oslešica (pronounced [ˈoːslɛʃitsa], German: Osleschitz) is a former settlement in the Municipality of Šentjur in eastern Slovenia. It is now part of the village of Loka pri Žusmu. The area is part of the traditional region of Styria. The municipality is now included in the Savinja Statistical Region.

== Geography ==
Oslešica lies in the hills south of the village center of Loka pri Žusmu. It is a scattered settlement along the headwaters of Virštanj Creek (Virštanjski potok) below the Rudnica Ridge, which stands to the northeast. Before it was annexed, it included the hamlets of Grmada, Javoršica, and Zavrečnica; these are all part of Loka pri Žusmu today.

== History ==
Oslešica was annexed by Loka pri Žusmu in 1953, ending its existence as an independent settlement.
