= Sveti Vid, Vuzenica =

Sveti Vid
- Location in Slovenia
- Coordinates: 46°36′13.12″N 15°11′17.69″E
- Country: Slovenia
- Traditional region: Styria
- Statistical region: Carinthia
- Municipality: Vuzenica

Area
  - Total: 10.15 km^{2} (3.92 sq mi)
- Elevation: 372.7 m (1,223 ft)

Population (2020)
  - Total: 426
  - Density: 42.0/km^{2} (109/sq mi)

Sveti Vid (pronounced [ˈsʋeːti ˈʋiːt]) is a settlement in the Municipality of Vuzenica in northern Slovenia. It has a population cluster lying on the right bank of the Drava River, and extends south and upwards, with dispersed properties in the heavily wooded Pohorje Hills. The settlement, and the municipality, are included in the Carinthia Statistical Region, which is in the Slovenian portion of the historical Duchy of Styria.

The local parish church, from which the settlement gets its name, is dedicated to Saint Vitus (Slovene: sveti Vid) and belongs to the Roman Catholic Archdiocese of Maribor. It was built in the early 15th century.
