= Šentjanž nad Dravčami =

- Location in Slovenia
- Coordinates: 46°34′38.78″N 15°8′40.95″E
- Country: Slovenia
- Traditional region: Styria
- Statistical region: Carinthia
- Municipality: Vuzenica

Area
  - Total: 14.47 km^{2} (5.59 sq mi)
- Elevation: 661 m (2,169 ft)

Population (2020)
  - Total: 238
  - Density: 16.4/km^{2} (42.6/sq mi)

Šentjanž nad Dravčami (pronounced [ʃɛnˈtjaːnʃ nad ˈdɾaːu̯tʃami]) is a settlement in the Pohorje Hills in the Municipality of Vuzenica in northern Slovenia. The settlement, and the municipality, are included in the Carinthia Statistical Region, which is in the Slovenian portion of the historical Duchy of Styria.

The local church, from which the settlement gets its name, is dedicated to John the Baptist (Slovene: sveti Janez Krstnik or Šentjanž) and belongs to the Parish of Vuzenica. It developed from an early 14th-century chapel that was extended in the 15th century.
