= Ravne Castle =

Coordinates: 46°32′31.08″N 14°57′27.08″E

Ravne Castle (Slovene: Grad Ravne, German: Streiteben) is a castle near the town of Ravne na Koroškem, in the Carinthia region of northern Slovenia.

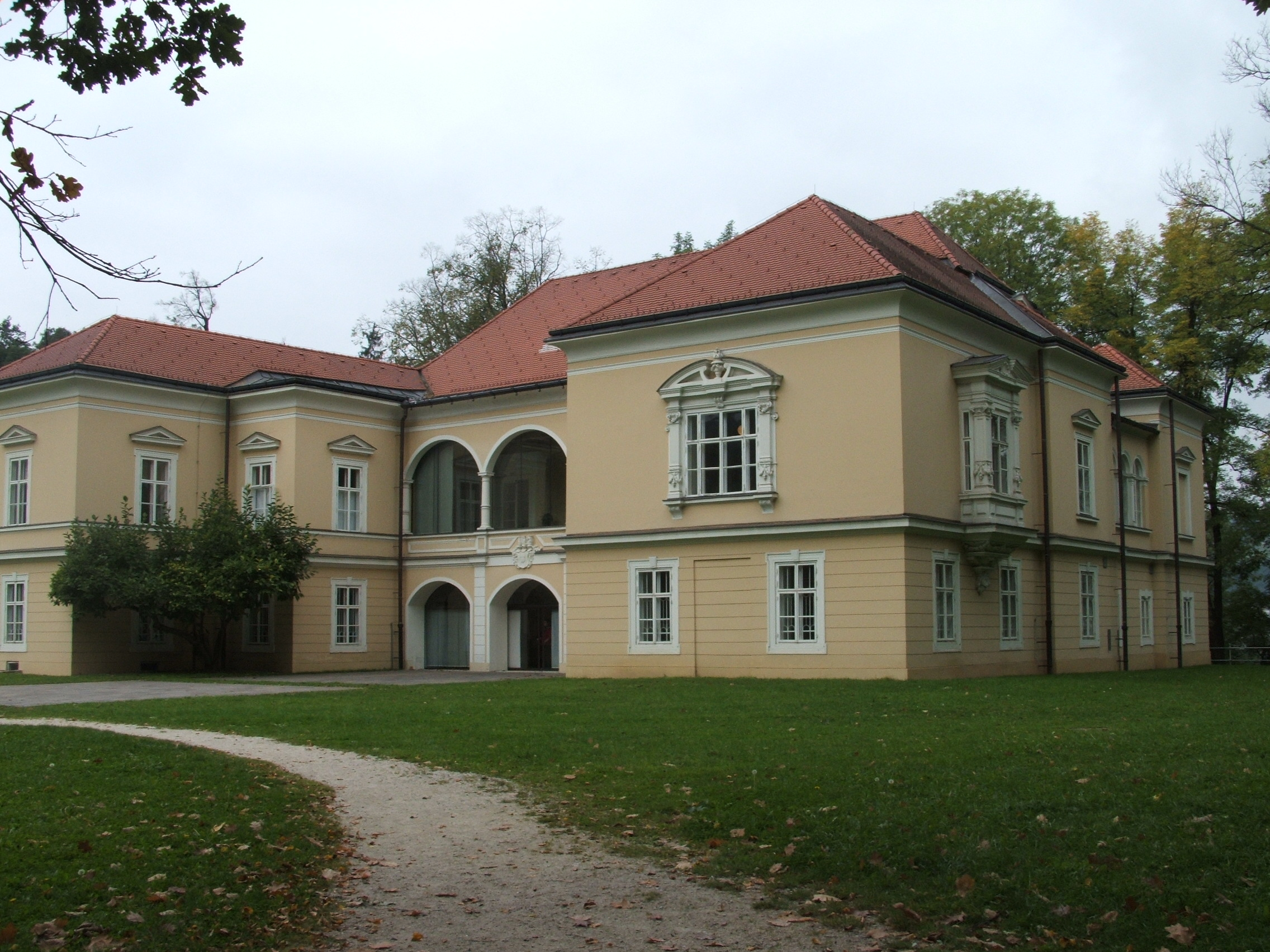
Ravne Castle

== History ==
The castle's German name is derived from the name of the Hebenstreit family, who built the castle in the 16th century. It is located on a gravelly terrace above the center of the town of Ravne na Koroškem, on the Ravne plateau near the banks of the Meža (German: Eben) River.

In the mid-17th century, the castle passed into the hands of the Sichten family, and a foundry was established on the terrace beside the river. From 1700 on it was owned by the Gačnik (German: Schlangenberg) family. In 1809 it was purchased by the Counts of Thurn, who rebuilt it into its current neo-Baroque form in 1863 and established the surrounding park.

The historian Johann Weikhard von Valvasor included an etching of the castle in his 1688 Topographia Archiducatus Carinthiae, the image likely reflecting the appearance of the original Hebenstreit building.

The castle's most recent renovation was conducted with respect to its cultural value. Since 1949 it has housed the Dr. Franc Sušnik Central Carinthian Library (Slovene: Koroška osrednja knjižnica dr. Franc Sušnik). The Art Salon (Likovni salon) shares the site, operating (under the auspices of the Ravne Museum) exhibits on the history of the town and the Meža Valley, as well as regular art exhibits. Since 1969, artistic retreats have been held at the castle; as a result, the castle exhibits include a rich collection of paintings and small sculptures.
