= Municipality of Vuzenica =

Municipality of Slovenia

Municipality of Vuzenica Občina Vuzenica
- Municipality
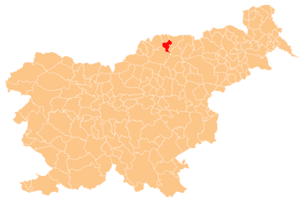
- Location of the Municipality of Vuzenica in Slovenia
- Coordinates: 46°34′N 15°09′E

Government
  - Mayor: Franjo Golob

Area
  - Total: 50.1 km^{2} (19.3 sq mi)

Population (2020)
  - Total: 2,649
  - Density: 52.9/km^{2} (137/sq mi)
- Time zone: UTC+01 (CET)
  - Summer (DST): UTC+02 (CEST)
- Website: www.vuzenica.si

The Municipality of Vuzenica (pronounced [ʋuzɛˈniːtsa]; Slovene: Občina Vuzenica) is a municipality in northern Slovenia. Vuzenica became a municipality in 1994. The seat of the municipality is the town of Vuzenica.

== Settlements ==
In addition to the municipal seat of Vuzenica, the municipality also includes the following settlements:

- Dravče
- Šentjanž nad Dravčami
- Sveti Primož na Pohorju
- Sveti Vid
