= Dravče =

- Location in Slovenia
- Coordinates: 46°35′21.27″N 15°7′44.69″E
- Country: Slovenia
- Traditional region: Styria
- Statistical region: Carinthia
- Municipality: Vuzenica

Area
  - Total: 6.1 km^{2} (2.4 sq mi)
- Elevation: 374.3 m (1,228 ft)

Population (2020)
  - Total: 131
  - Density: 21/km^{2} (56/sq mi)

Dravče (pronounced [ˈdɾaːu̯tʃɛ]) is a settlement in the Municipality of Vuzenica in northern Slovenia. It has a population cluster lying on the right bank of the Drava River, and extends south and upwards, with dispersed properties in the heavily wooded Pohorje Hills. The settlement, and the municipality, are included in the Carinthia Statistical Region, which is in the Slovenian portion of the historical Duchy of Styria.
