= Franz Miklosich =

Slovenian philologist (1813–1891)

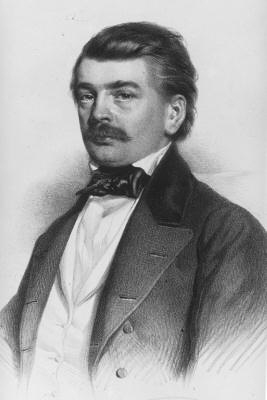
- Miklosich by Adolf Dauthage, 1853
- Born: 20 November 1813; Radomerščak, Ljutomer, Austrian Empire (now Slovenia)
- Died: 7 March 1891 (aged 77); Vienna, Austria-Hungary (now Austria)
- Other name: Franz Xaver Ritter von Miklosich
- Citizenship: Austrian
- Education: University of Graz (PhD); University of Vienna (Dr. iur.)
- Occupation: philologist

Franz Miklosich (German: Franz Ritter von Miklosich, Slovene: Franc Miklošič; 20 November 1813 – 7 March 1891) was a Slovenian philologist and rector of the University of Vienna.

== Early life ==
Miklosich was born in the small village of Radomerščak near the Lower Styrian town of Ljutomer, then part of the Austrian Empire, and baptized Franz Xav. Mikloschitsh. He graduated from the University of Graz with a doctor of philosophy degree.

== Career ==
He was a professor of philosophy at the University of Graz. In 1838, he went to the University of Vienna, where he received a doctor of law decree. During his studies, he became influenced by the works of the Slovenian philologist and linguist Jernej Kopitar. He abandoned law, devoting most of his later life to the study of Slavic languages.

In 1844, he obtained a post at the Imperial Library of Vienna, where he remained until 1862. In 1844, he published a review of Franz Bopp's book Comparative Grammar, which attracted attention from the Viennese academic circles. This publication then launched a long series of works, in which Miklosich showed immense erudition. His works led to a revolutionary change in the study of Slavic languages.

In 1849 Miklosich was appointed to the newly created chair of Slavic philology at the University of Vienna, and he occupied it until 1886. He became a member of the Academy of Vienna, which appointed him secretary of its historical and philosophical section, a member of the council of public instruction and of the upper house, and correspondent of the French Academy of Inscriptions and Humanities. His numerous writings deal not only with the Slavic languages, but also with Romanian, Aromanian, Albanian, Greek, and Romani.

Between 1850 and 1865 he was the Dean of the Faculty of Philosophy for three terms, and the Rector in 1853/1854.

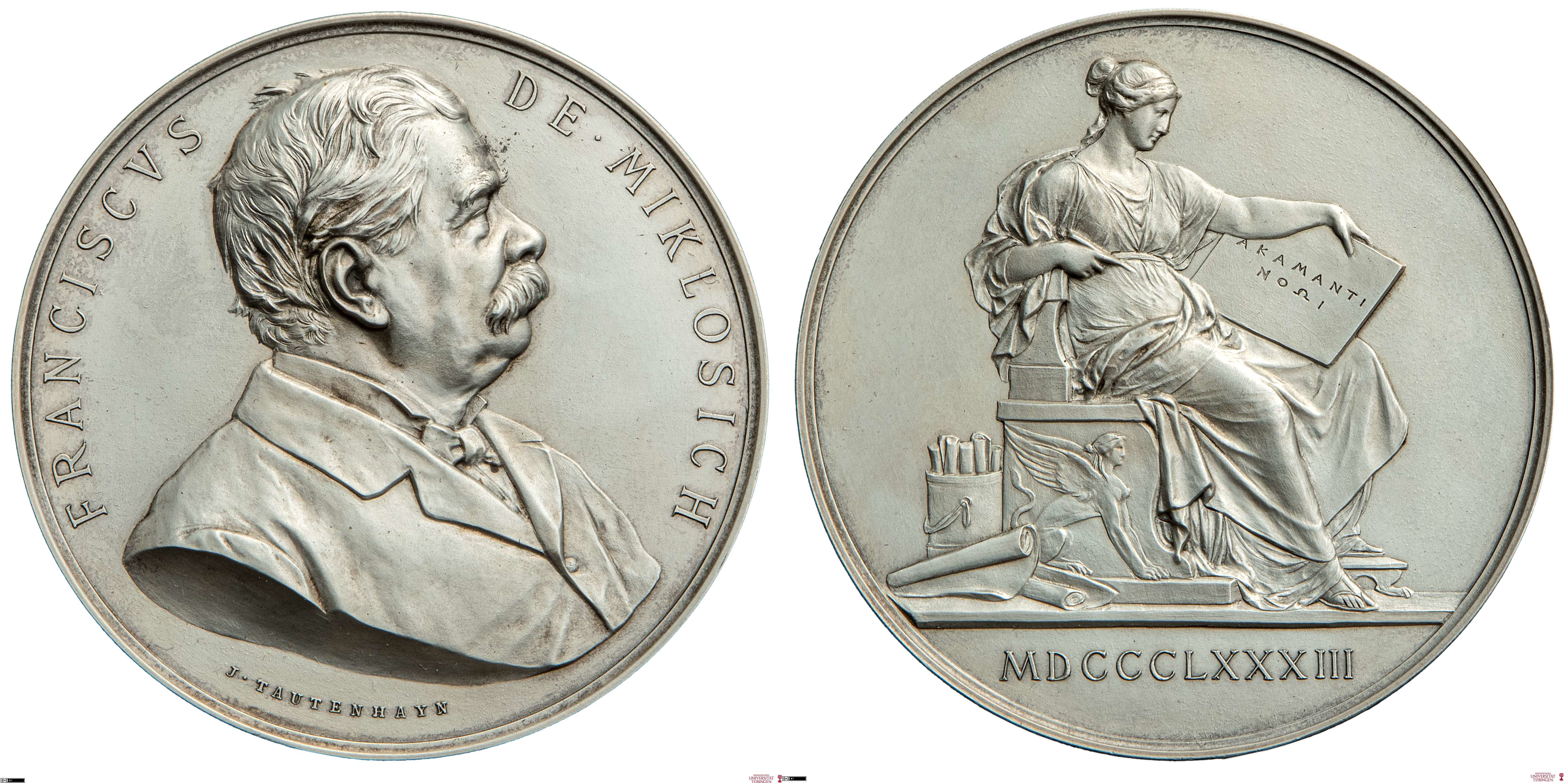
Franz von Miklosich medal, 1883

From 1872 to 1880, Miklosich published his original survey of Romani dialects, Über die Mundarten und Wanderungen der Zigeuner Europas. This work included a discussion of their origins, migration routes, an historical-comparative grammar, and a lexicon. He identified a substantial Greek element that was shared by the Romani dialects, and thus named a "Greek-speaking area" as the "European homeland of the Gypsies".

In 1883, on the occasion of his 70th birthday, he received a medal commissioned by the Austrian Academy of Sciences.

== Political engagement ==
In the Spring of Nations of 1848, Miklosich, who was 35 at the time, actively engaged in the Slovene national movement. He was the chairman of the political association, called Slovenija (Slovenia) organized by Slovene students that studied in Graz and Vienna. Together with Matija Majar and Lovro Toman, he was among the authors who elaborated the political demand for a United Slovenia. After the failure of the revolutionary requests, he again turned to exclusively academic activity.

== Selected bibliography ==
- Radices linguae Slovenicae. Veteris dialecti. Leipzig: In Libraria Weidmannia. 1845.
- Lexicon linguae Slovenicae. Veteris dialecti. Vienna. 1850.
- Vergleichende Formenlehre der slavischen Sprachen (in German). 1856.
- Monumenta Serbica Spectantia Historiam Serbiae, Bosniae, Ragusii (in Serbian). Vienna. 1858.
- Miklosich, Franz (1856). Die Sprache der Bulgaren in Siebenbürgen (in German). Vienna. pp. 105–146.
- "Die Bildung der slavischen Personennamen". Denkschriften der Kaiserlichen Akademie der Wissenschaften. Philosophisch-Historische Classe (in German). Vienna: Kaiserlich-Königliche Hof- und Staatsdruckerei. 1860.
- Lexicon palaeoslovenico-graeco-latinum: emendatum auctum. Vienna: Guilelmus Braumueller. 1862–1865.
- Die Bildung der Ortsnamen aus Personennamen im Slavischen (in German). Vienna. 1864.
- Die slavischen Monatsnamen (in German). Vienna. 1867.
- Über die Mundarten und die Wanderungen der Zigeuner Europa's (in German). Vienna. 1872.
- Altslovenische Lautlehre (in German). Vienna. 1878.
- Miklošič, Franc (1883). Geschichte der Lautbezeichnung im Bulgarischen (in German). Vienna.
- Etymologisches Wörterbuch der slavischen Sprachen (in German). Vienna. 1886.
- Vergleichende Grammatik der slavischen Sprachen (in German). Vol. 1. Vienna. 1879.
- Vergleichende Grammatik der slavischen Sprachen (in German). Vol. 2. Vienna. 1875.
- Vergleichende Grammatik der slavischen Sprachen (in German). Vol. 3. Vienna. 1876.
- Vergleichende Grammatik der slavischen Sprachen (in German). Vol. 4. Vienna. 1868–1874.

== See also ==
- Austroslavism
- Culture of Slovenia
- Vienna Literary Agreement
