= Vuzenica =

Town in Slovenia

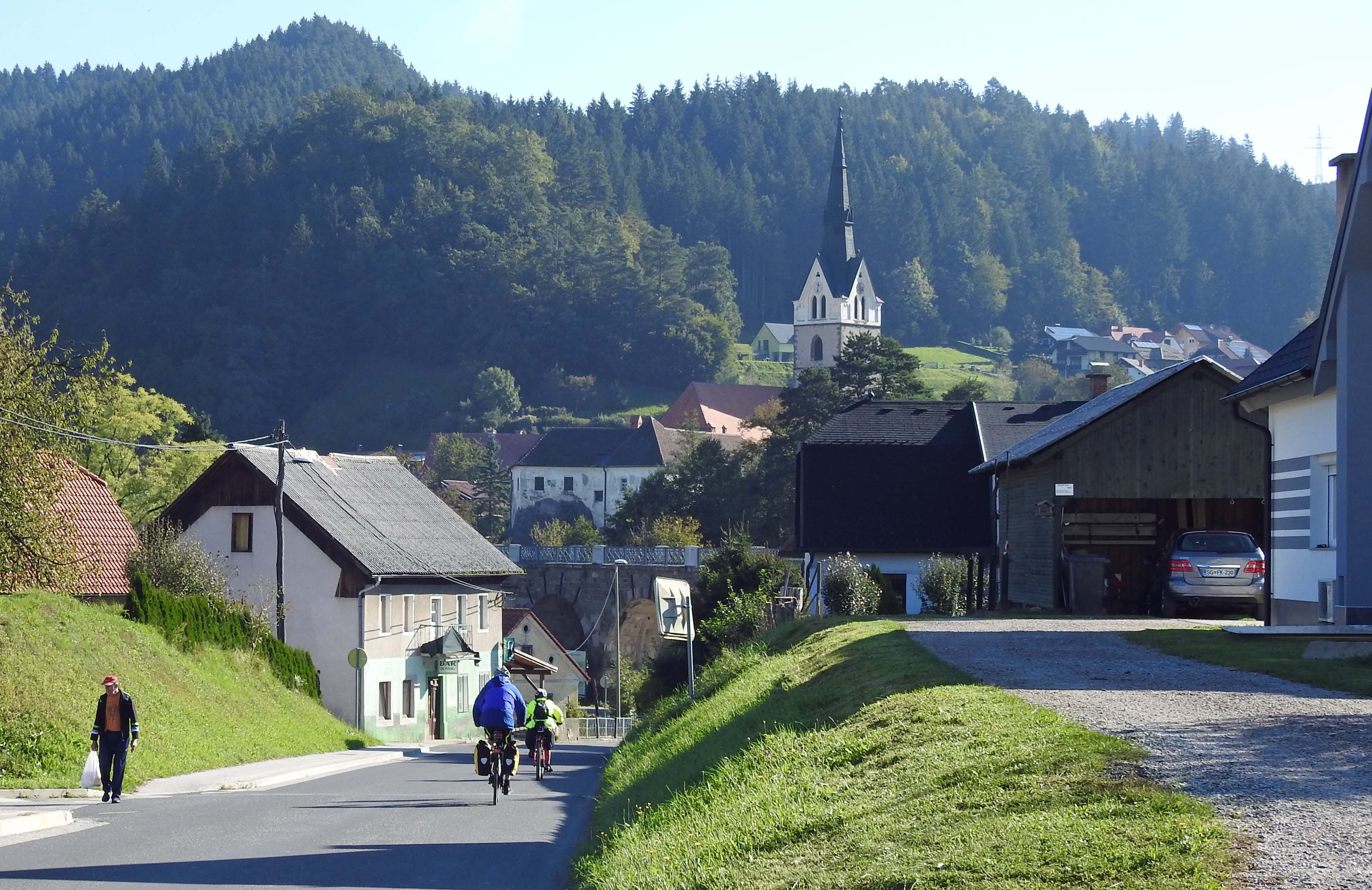

- Location in Slovenia
- Coordinates: 46°35′48″N 15°10′08″E
- Country: Slovenia
- Traditional region: Styria
- Statistical region: Carinthia
- Municipality: Vuzenica

Area
  - Total: 2.9 km^{2} (1.1 sq mi)
- Elevation: 364.9 m (1,197 ft)

Population (2020)
  - Total: 1,522
  - Density: 520/km^{2} (1,400/sq mi)

Vuzenica (pronounced [ʋuzɛˈniːtsa], German: Saldenhofen) is a major settlement in northern Slovenia. It is the seat of the Municipality of Vuzenica. It lies on the right bank of the Drava River and extends south into the Pohorje Hills. The municipality is included in the Carinthia Statistical Region, which is in the Slovenian portion of the historical Duchy of Styria. During the Middle Ages, Saldenhofen Castle was the seat of the imperial or ducal burgraves of Saldenhofen.

== Name ==
Vuzenica was attested in written sources as Saldenhouen in 1238, Saeldenhoven in 1248, and Seldenhoven in 1251. The Slovene name Vuzenica is derived from *(v)ǫziti 'to narrow' or *(v)ǫzina 'narrow area', referring to the narrow flat area between the Drava River and the Pohorje Massif where the settlement is located. The development of the pretonic vowel o (< ǫ) into u is a local dialect feature.

== History ==
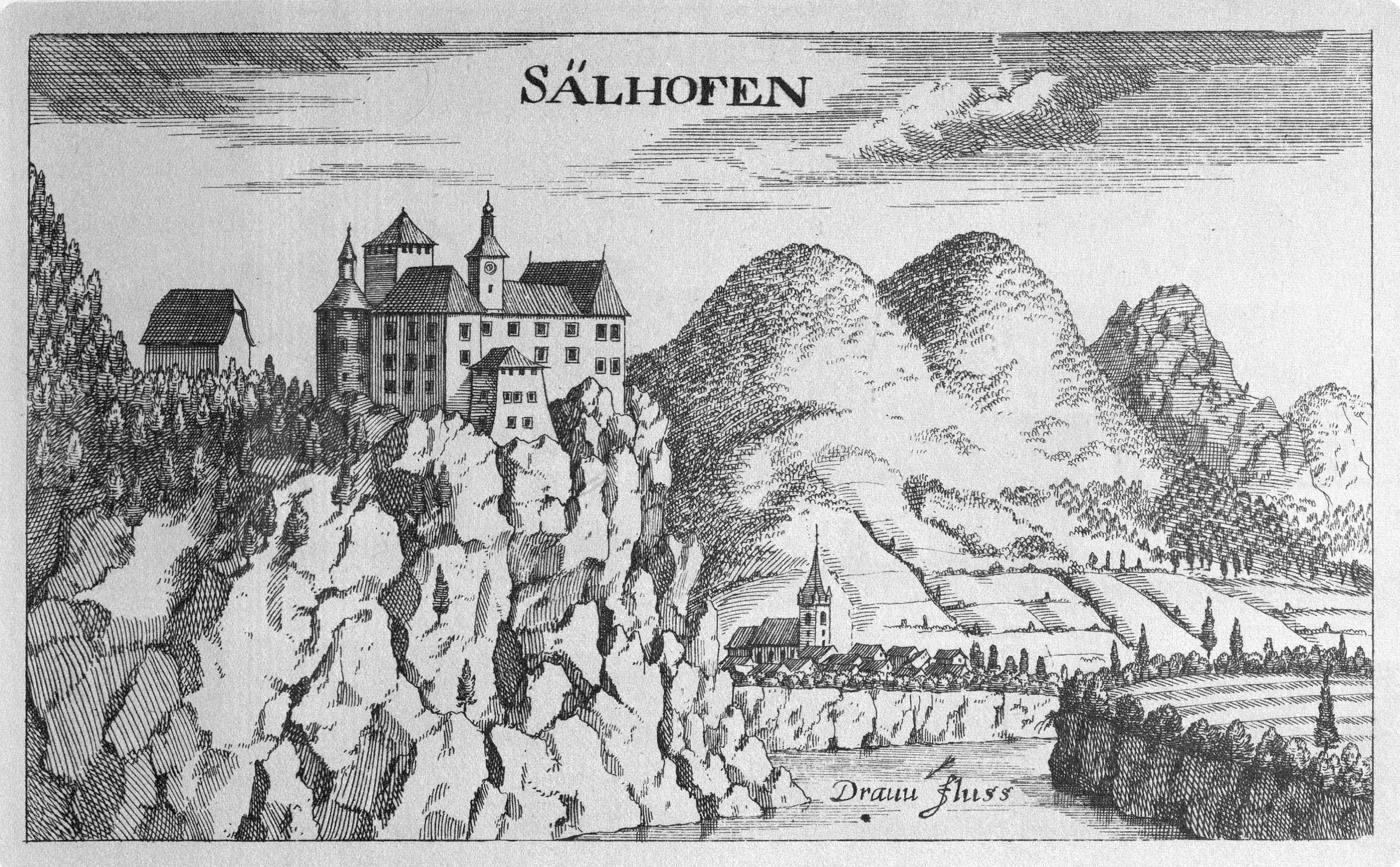
Saldenhofen (Vuzenica) Castle

Vuzenica was first mentioned as a settlement in written documents dating to 1238, but archaeological evidence shows the area was settled much earlier as a Roman period burial ground has been found there. Of the 13th-century castle above the settlement, the seat of the burgraves of Saldenhofen, only parts of the walls survive.

=== Burgrave of Saldenhofen ===
The Burgrave of Saldenhofen (German: Burggraf auf (von) Saldenhofen; title also used as Pfleger; sort of a viscount) was an Austrian-Styrian administrative title during the Middle Ages. During the 15th century, the Habsburg, the rulers of Austria (Styria), left Saldenhofen to the burgraves to administer and secure the valley.

==== House of Graben ====
The Graben zu Kornberg family held the title of Burgrave of Saldenhofen between 1494 and 1509. It started in 1494, when Wolfgang von Graben and his two brothers Wilhelm and Andree von Graben negotiated with the Roman-German King Maximilian I about the estimated value of their share in the Glauning forest (municipality of Sankt Peter am Ottersbach), including villages, farmers, and two ponds. In return, they came into possession of the lordship and Saldenhofen Castle. In 1498 Wolfgang was named imperial burggrave of Saldenhofen. With the handover to Sigmund von Eibiswald in 1509, the short-lived Graben-Saldenhofen line of ownership ended.

The Graben-titles Burggraf von (auf) Saldenhofen, Herr von Kornberg, Marburg, Obermarburg, Radkersburg, Neudenstein, Weinberg und Graben were not subsequently passed on from Wolfgang von Graben (died 1521) zu Kornberg to his son Peter von Graben (born 1450/60). In 1476, Wolfgang and young Peter went to Holland in the entourage of Archduke Maximilian of Austria (the later Holy Roman Emperor). Peter stayed in Holland and took the name (Pieter) Graeff, which in the 15th century was the Dutch translation of the German name Graben. For certain reasons (illegitimacy, renunciation?), Pieter was not entitled to inherit. The titles and honors excluded the Saldenhofen one and therefore passed to Wolfgang's younger brothers Andree von Graben (died 1521), possibly Georg von Graben (died 1522), and Wilhelm von Graben (died 1523).

==== Graben heirs ====
Pieter Graeff had one son, Jan Pietersz Graeff (before 1500 – 1553), who founded various lines of the mostly Dutch family De Graeff. The members of the older family lines had no known claim to these titles and honors of Wolfgang von Graben. The situation is different with the younger Austrian Gräff line, which has claimed several titles and honors since at least the early 19th century, including Burggraf von (auf) Saldenhofen. The claim to the inheritance of these titles can be traced back at least to Lambert Gräf(f), OSB (1848–1933). Because Lambert was childless, he bequeathed this claim to the descendants of his cousin. Although the titles are still claimed, they are now mainly mentioned within the Gräff family and are not used publicly. Since 2008, the claim has been maintained by Matthias Laurenz Gräff. Although he does not use the titles, he is considered a current title contender, even if his legacy is only theoretical.

=== Anton Martin Slomšek ===
Anton Martin Slomšek (1800–1864) was a renowned Slovenian figure who served as a dean and parish priest in Vuzenica from 1838 to 1844. He advocated for the use of Slovene in education and made significant contributions in various fields, including agriculture, law, spirituality, nationality, education, enlightenment, and literature. Known for his influential and educational sermons, Slomšek authored notable works such as Mnemosynon Slavicum – Spomin slovenski and the widely known educational manual Blaže and Nežica in Sunday School during his tenure in Vuzenica.

The memorial museum dedicated to Anton Martin Slomšek is housed within the historic Vuzenica rectory building. The museum showcases original objects from Slomšek's time, including his writing desk and bed. Notable achievements by Slomšek include the construction of the Wallner Chapel, restoration projects of local buildings and cemeteries, and his contributions to education. A feature of the museum is a Baroque wooden ceiling, known as the "Vuzenica ceiling," dating back to 1653, with diverse motifs from the Baroque era. In addition, the museum space, partially reconfigured, serves as a library originally arranged by Slomšek and hosts cultural events.

== Church ==
The parish church in Vuzenica is dedicated to Saint Nicholas and belongs to the Roman Catholic Archdiocese of Maribor. It was built in the mid-13th century on the site of a 12th-century church. It was partly rebuilt and extended in the 14th and 15th centuries. A second church is dedicated to the Virgin Mary and dates to the late 14th century.
