= Hebenstreit =

Hebenstreit (from German: heben (obsolete) "to begin", "to start" plus Streit "dispute", "fight", "argument", thus literally "quarrel-monger") is a German surname from a nickname denoting a quarrelsome, cantankerous person and may refer to:

== People ==
- Johann Ernst Hebenstreit (1703–1757), German physician and naturalist
- Michael Hebenstreit (1812–1875), Austrian Kapellmeister and composer for stage music
- Pantaleon Hebenstreit (1668–1750), German dance teacher, musician and composer
