= Belgramoni–Tacco Mansion =

Mansion

Coordinates: 45°32′53.75″N 13°43′41.25″E

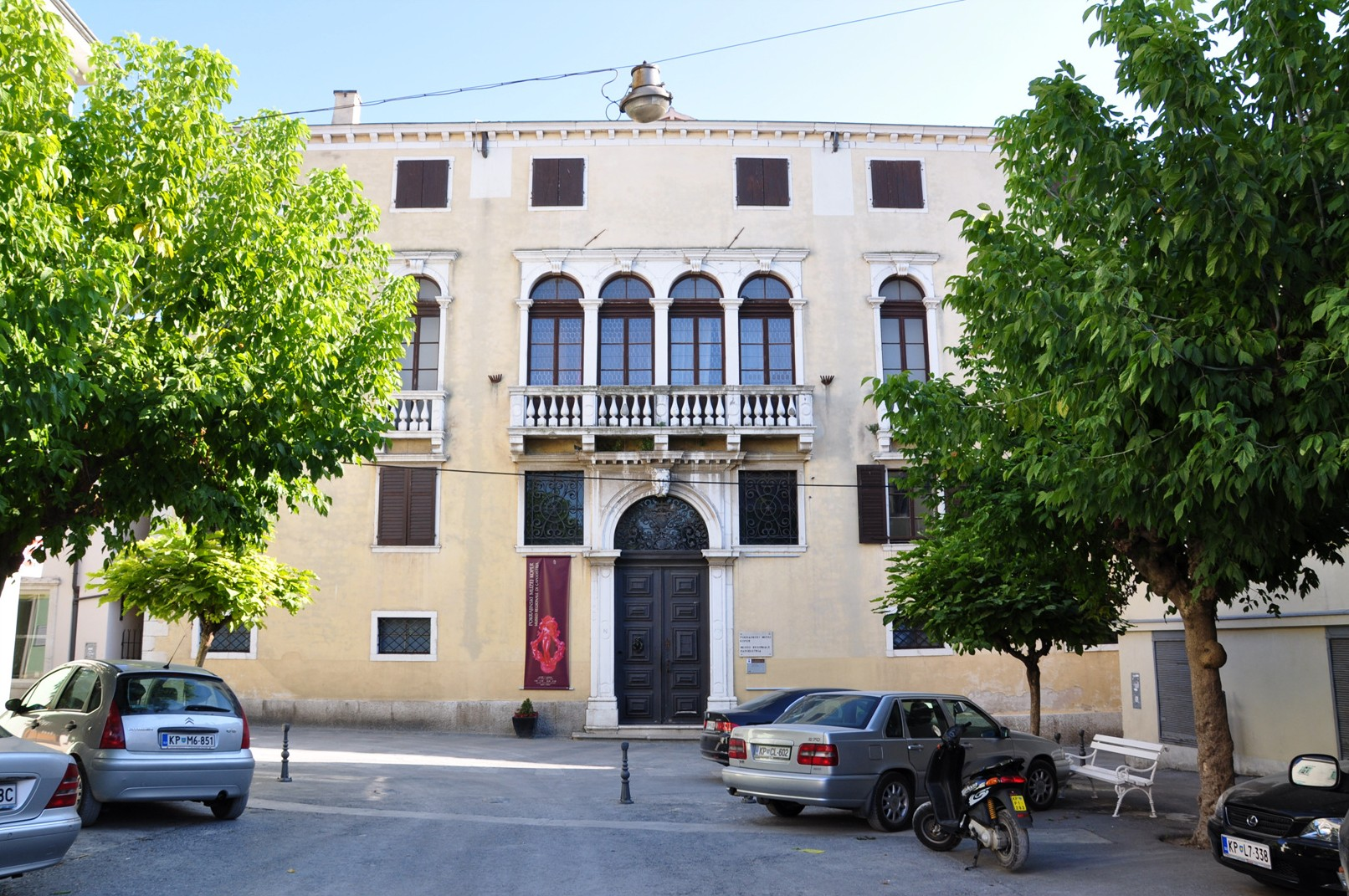
Belgramoni–Tacco Mansion

Belgramoni–Tacco Mansion (Slovene: palača Belgramoni-Tacco; Italian: palazzo Belgramoni-Tacco) is a mansion in the city of Koper, in southwestern Slovenia. It was built around 1600. It features elements of Renaissance and Baroque, but in general has been regarded as a Mannerist building. The mansion currently serves as the seat of the Regional Museum of Koper. It is protected as a cultural monument of local significance.
