= Liznjek Farm =

Museum in Kranjska Gora, Slovenia

Coordinates: 46°29′7.55″N 13°47′15.79″E

- Liznjekova domačija

General information
- Architectural style: Alpine architecture
- Location: Kranjska Gora, Slovenia
- Completed: 18th century
- Owner: Municipality of Kranjska Gora

The Liznjek Farm (Slovene: Liznjekova domačija) is an ethnographic museum housed in a renovated 18th-century farmhouse, located in the centre of the town of Kranjska Gora, Slovenia, at the street address 63 Borovška cesta. It is administered by the Upper Sava Museum, based in nearby Jesenice. The farm presents the living conditions of a wealthy peasant family of the mid-19th century.

The house is of mostly brick construction, with a wooden upper story; there is a furnished attic, and a full basement level, including a cellar and stable. A large barn across the courtyard is also part of the farm.

The interiors include the original furnishings, as well as items drawn from the collections of the Upper Sava Museum.

The basement features an exhibit on the life and work of the local writer Josip Vandot, author of the Kekec series of children's books.

== Gallery ==
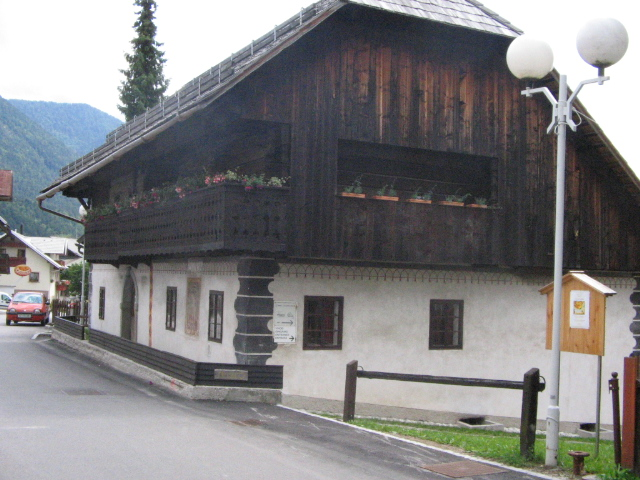
Front of house, facing road

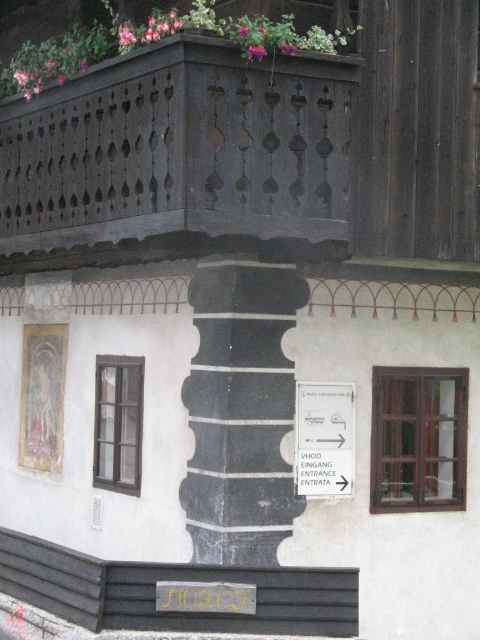
Corner stonework

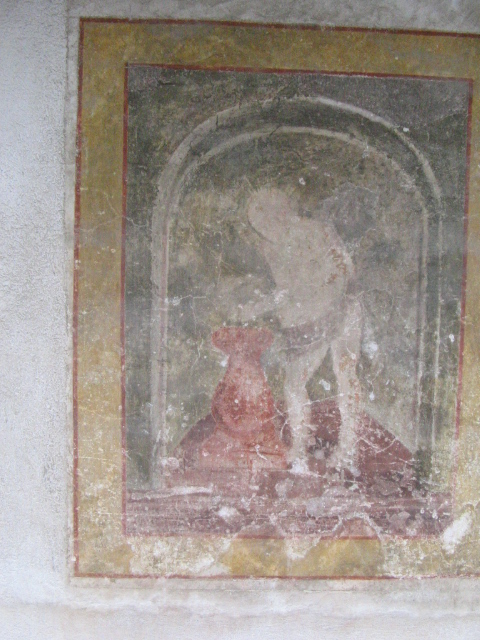
Fresco (facade)

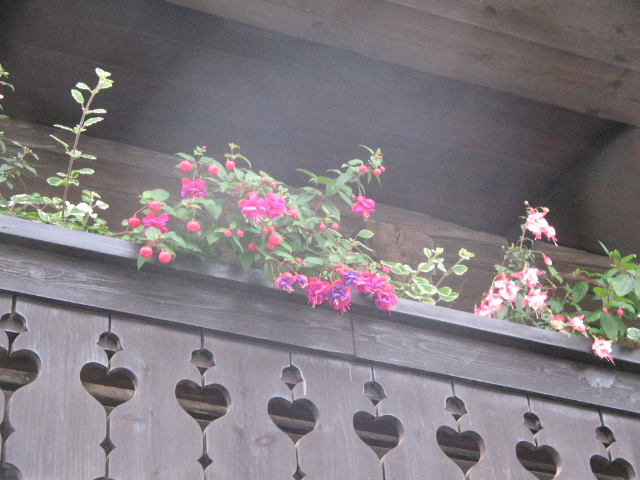
Balcony

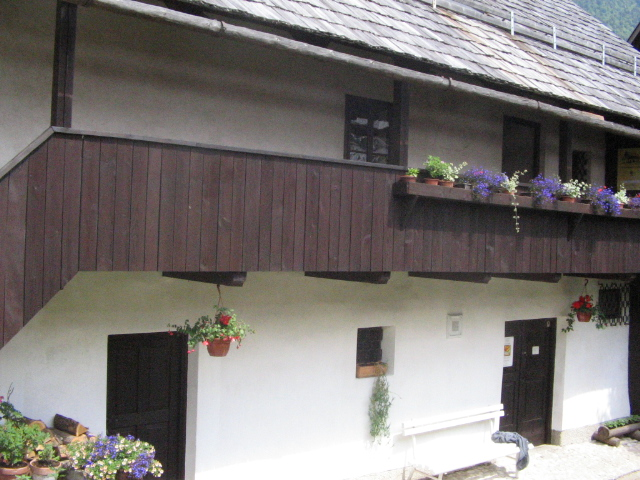
Courtyard side of house

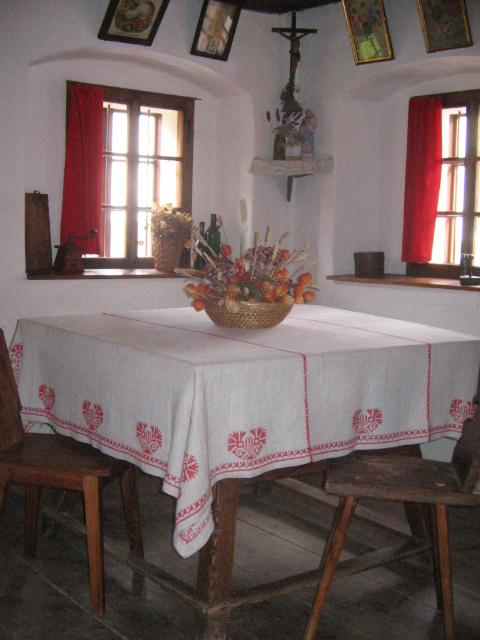
Shrine ("God's Corner")

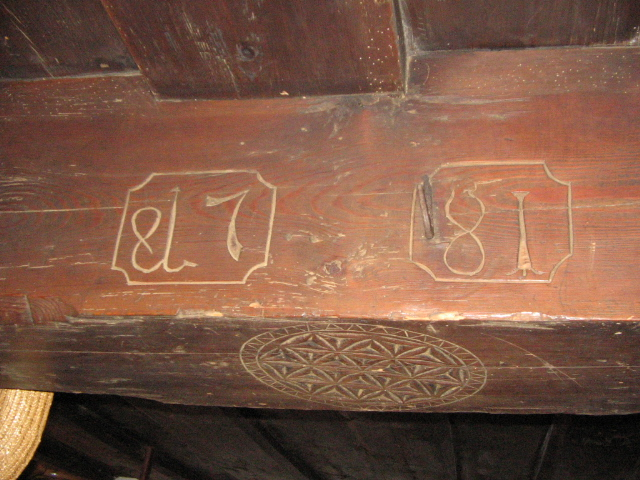
Date (1781) carving on interior beam

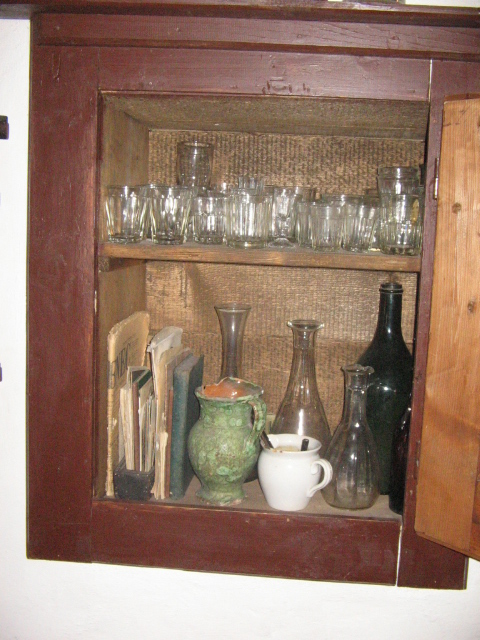
"Tabernacle" (closet)

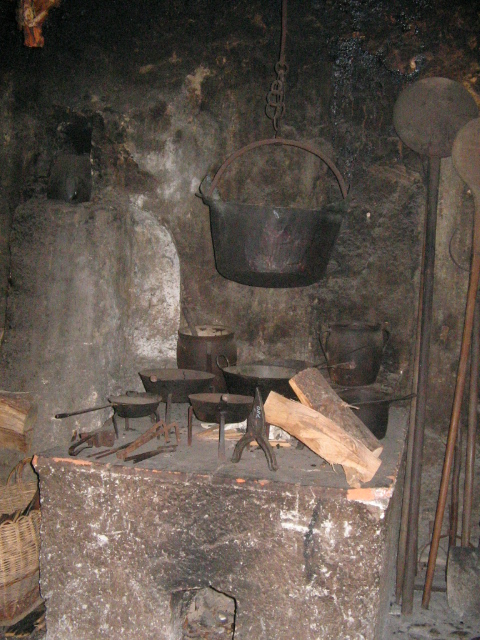
Open-fire kitchen

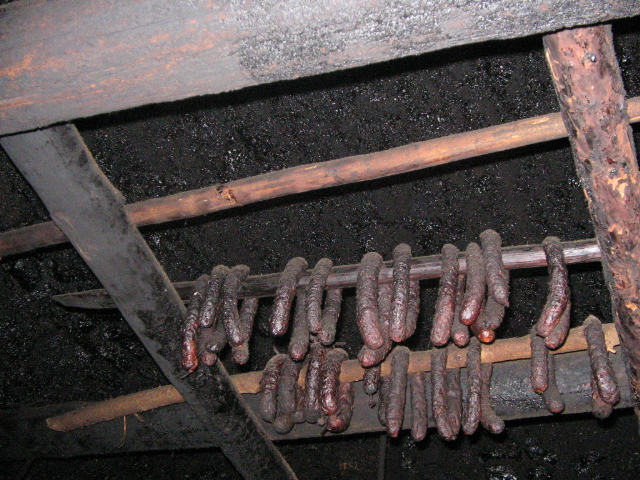
Smoked sausages, kitchen

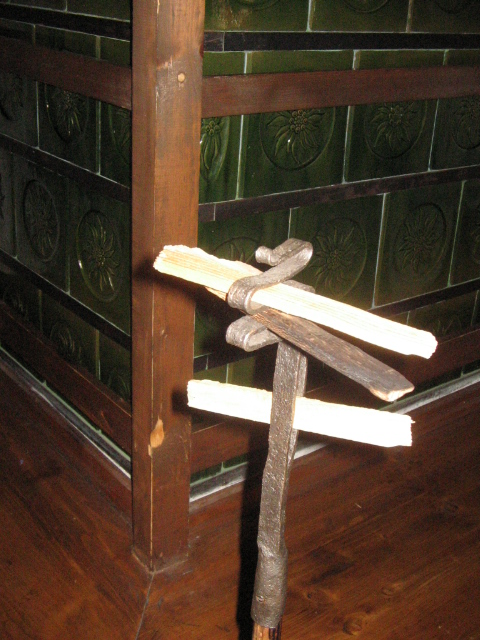
Drying armature, in front of fireplace

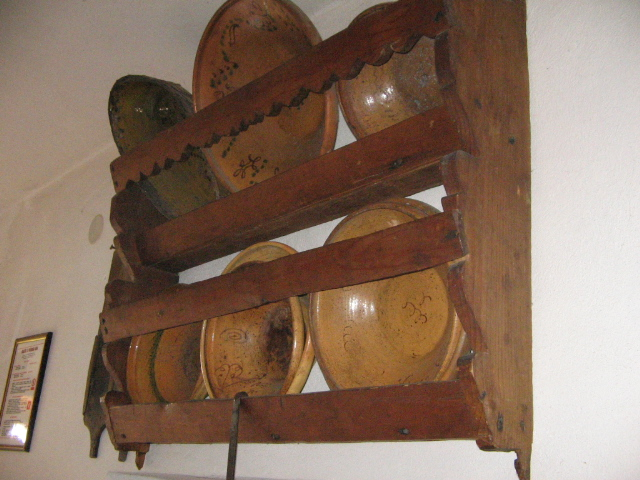
Dish caddy

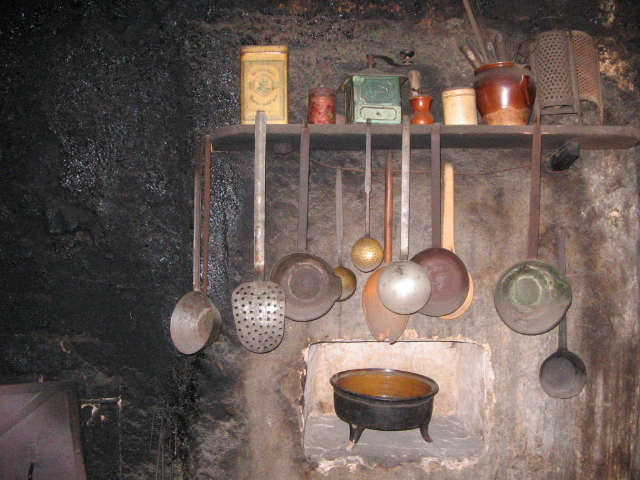
Ladles

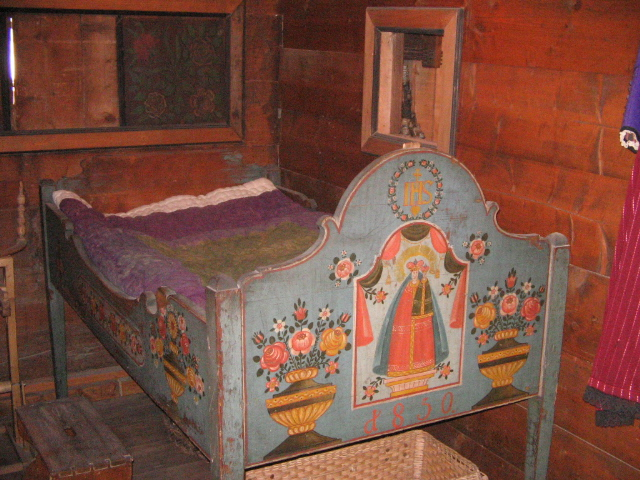
Bed

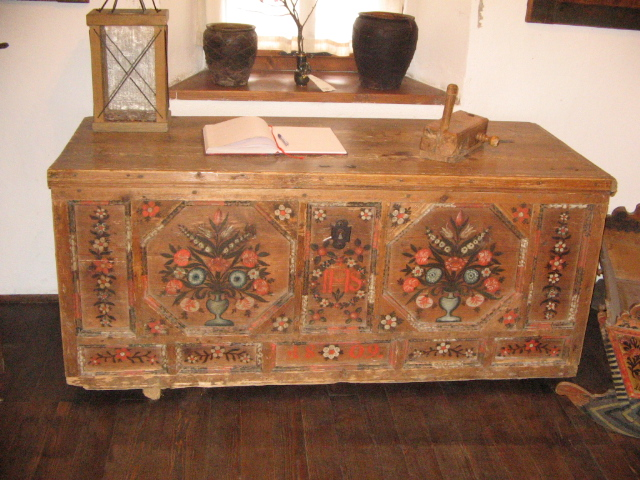
Painted chest

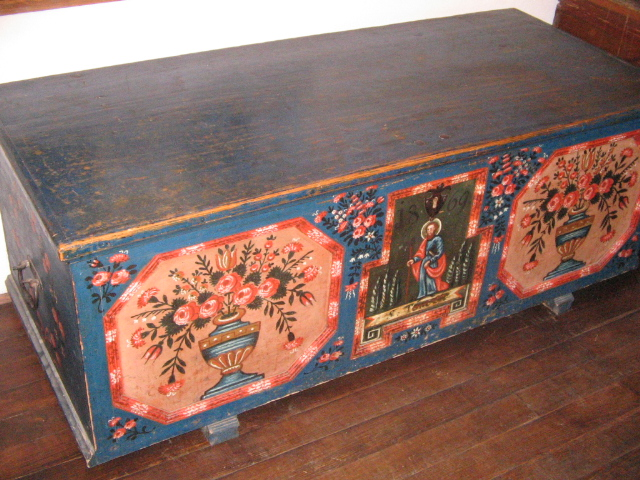
Painted chest

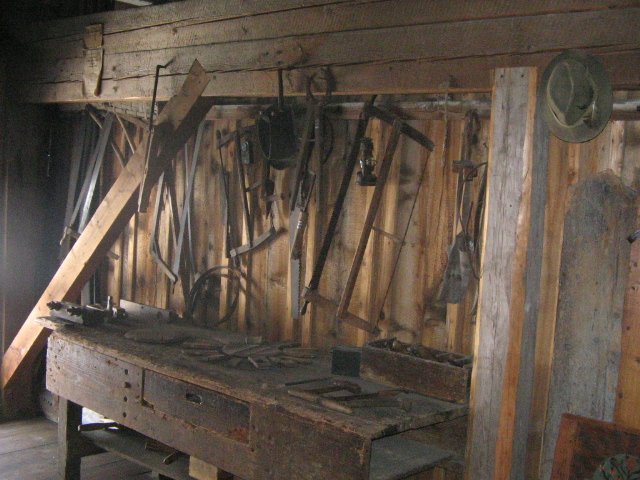
Carpentry tools

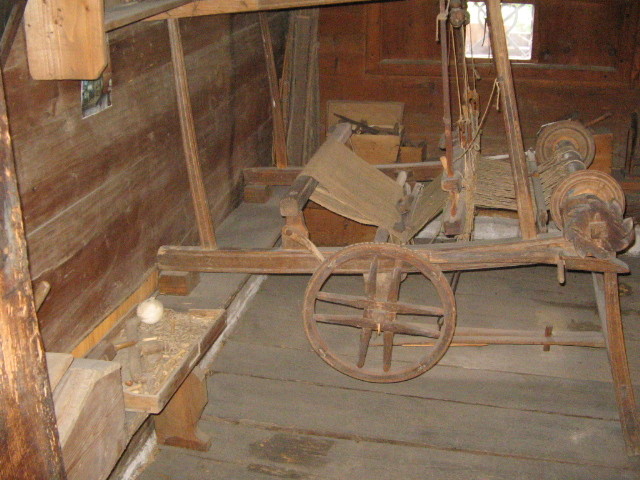
Loom

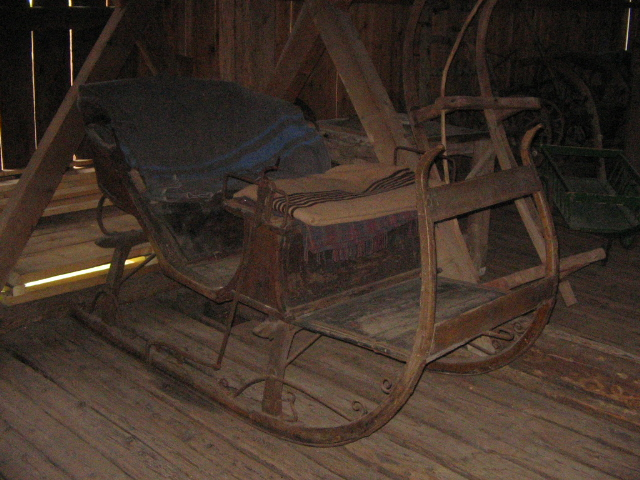
Sled
