= Radomerščak =

- Location in Slovenia
- Coordinates: 46°29′38.92″N 16°10′16.18″E
- Country: Slovenia
- Traditional region: Styria
- Statistical region: Mura
- Municipality: Ljutomer

Area
  - Total: 2.16 km^{2} (0.83 sq mi)
- Elevation: 287.8 m (944 ft)

Population (2002)
  - Total: 167

Radomerščak (pronounced [ˈɾaːdɔmɛɾʃtʃak], German: Pichelberg) is a settlement in the Municipality of Ljutomer in northeastern Slovenia. The area is part of the traditional region of Styria and is now included in the Mura Statistical Region.

The Slovene philologist Franz Miklosich was born in the village in 1813. The house where he was born is preserved as a museum. It dates to the 17th century and was expanded in 1926, when a commemorative plaque was also unveiled. It was restored in 1960 and again in 1991.

The chapel-shrine in the north of the settlement was built in the late 19th century.
