= Tolmin Museum =

Coordinates: 46°10′55.91″N 13°43′57.56″E

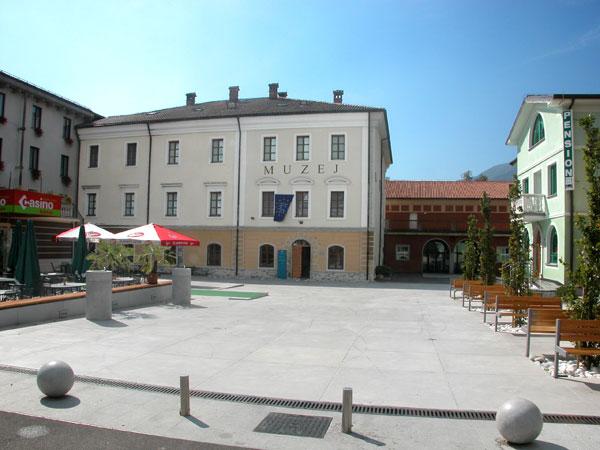
Tolmin Museum, city square, Tolmin

The Tolmin Museum is public institution which covers the areas of archaeology, ethnology, general history and history of arts at upper Soča Valley region in Slovenia. It is located in the Coronini mansion in Tolmin.

== History ==
The Tolmin Museum first opened to the public in 1951. In 1958, it became a part of the Gorizia Region Museum and remained under its auspices as the Tolmin Museum Collection for a full 42 years. In April 2000, the Tolmin Museum again became an independent public institution.

== Collections ==
The Tolmin Museum also maintains several external collections and buildings in addition to the collections and exhibitions in the main building. It administers the Archaeological museum and the foundations of the Roman house in Most na Soči, the memorial exhibitions on Simon Gregorčič in Vrsno, on Ciril Kosmač in Slap ob Idrijci, and on Simon Rutar in the village of Krn, the ethnological collections in the Triglav National Park lodge in Trenta, in the village core of Breginj, and in Robidišče, the wooden granary in Pečine, and the German ossuary at the confluence of the Soča and Tolminka rivers.
