= Slovenian Alpine Museum =

Mountaineering museum in Mojstrana, Slovenia

Coordinates: 46°27′28.76″N 13°56′9.93″E

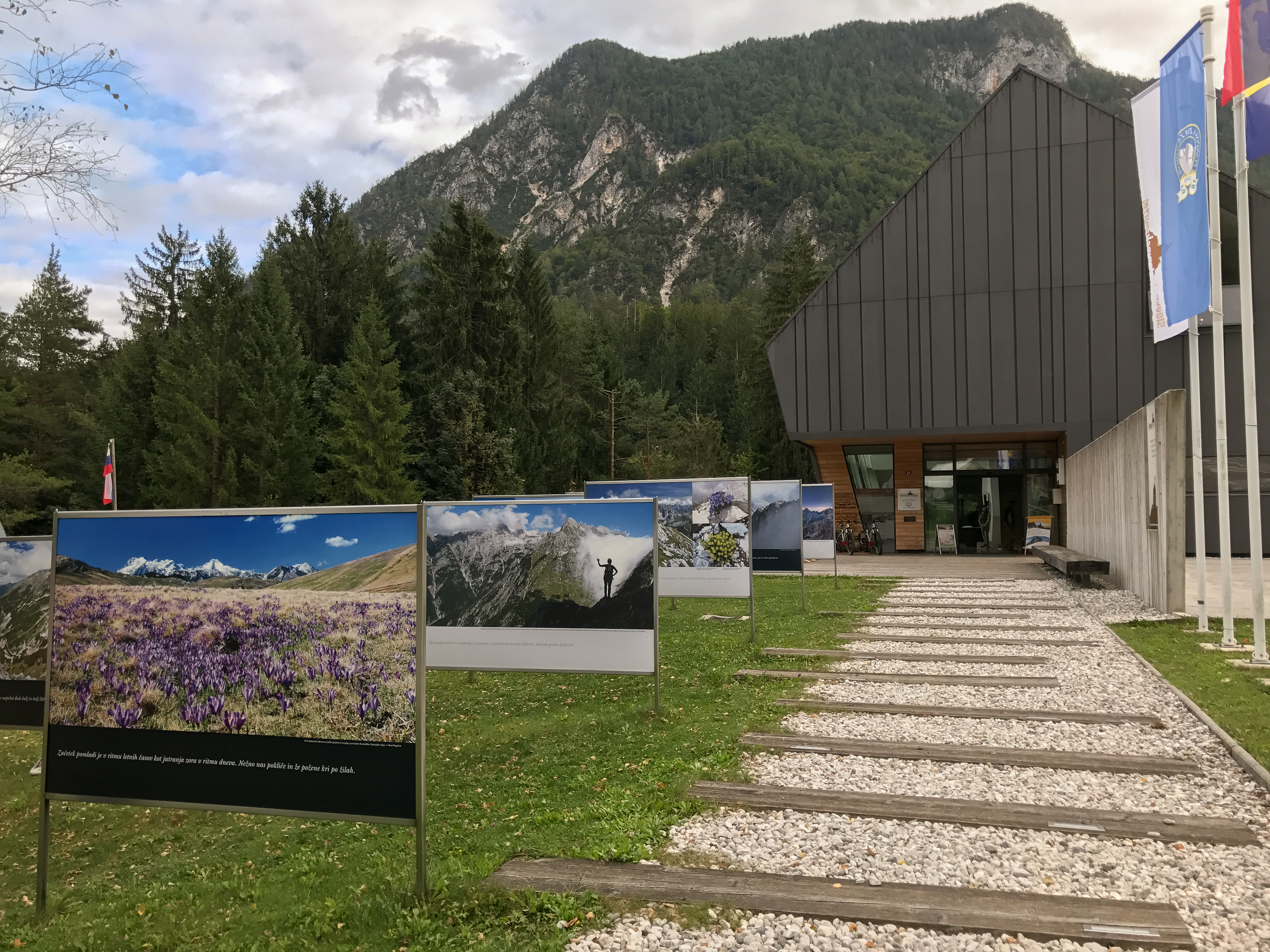
Slovenian Alpine Museum, Mojstrana

The Slovenian Alpine Museum (Slovene: Slovenski planinski muzej) is a mountaineering museum in Mojstrana in the vicinity of Triglav National Park (Julian Alps) in northwestern Slovenia. It was opened on 7 August 2010 by the president of Slovenia, Danilo Türk. It is operated by the Jesenice Upper Sava Museum. In June 2016, the Swiss King Albert I Memorial Foundation bestowed it the Albert Mountain Award for its important contribution to the sustainable development of the Alpine space.
