= Jesenice Upper Sava Museum =

Local museum in Slovenia

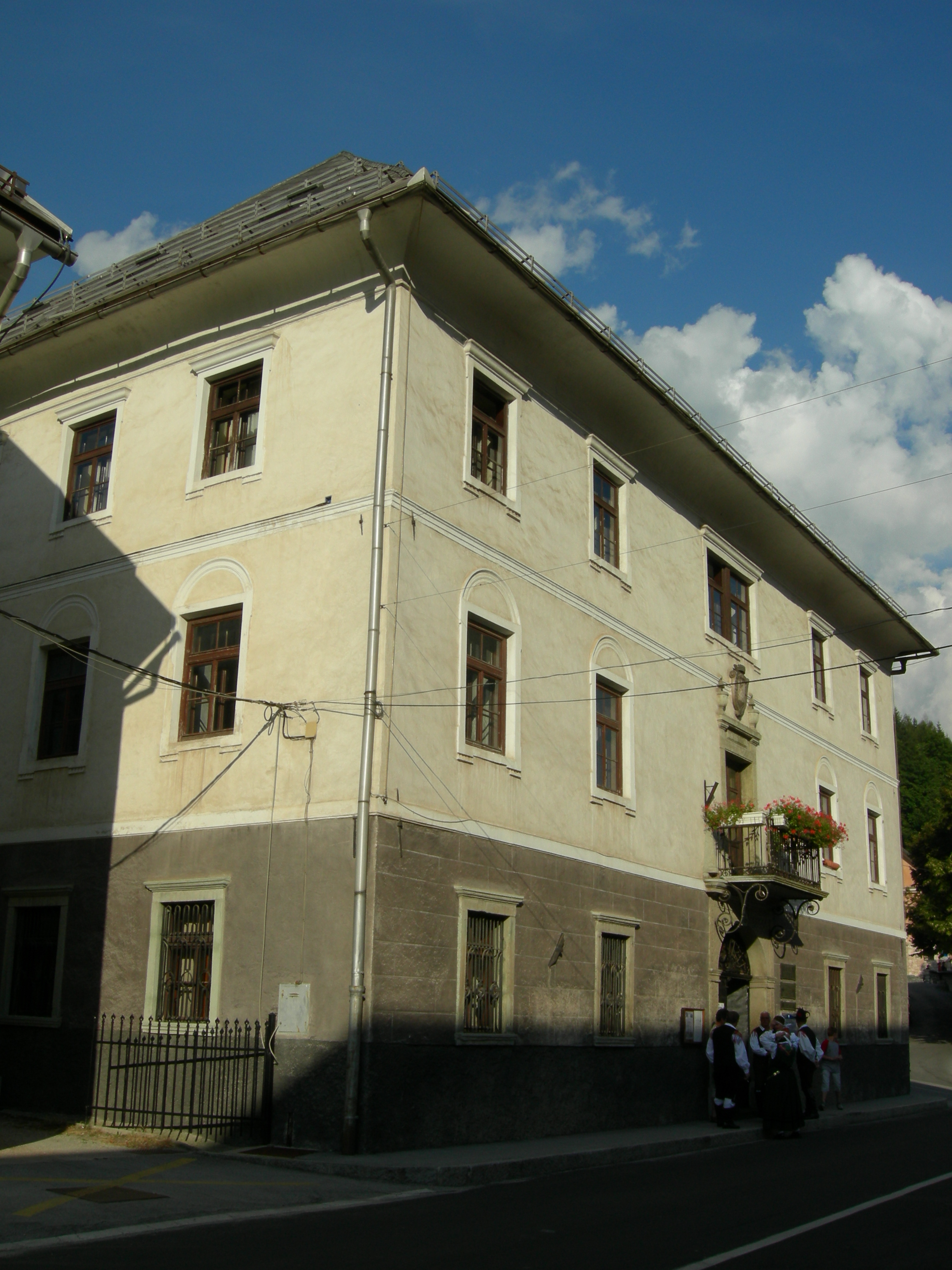
- Location: Slovenia
- Coordinates: 46°26′N 14°04′E
- Website: www.gmj.si
- Location of Jesenice Upper Sava Museum

The Jesenice Upper Sava Museum (Slovene: Gornjesavski muzej Jesenice) is a regional museum based in the town of Jesenice and the neighboring Municipality of Kranjska Gora, both in northwestern Slovenia. The museum's name refers to the general area it documents, the upper Sava Dolinka Valley. Its holdings include two restored historic farmhouses, the archives of the KID company, and display spaces in the two surviving "ironworks castles" (of the original four), manors built in the area during the 16th and early 17th centuries by the owners of local iron-mining and iron-processing works. The museum was established in its present form in 1992, although several of its constituent facilities operated independently beforehand.

Located in Jesenice;

- Bucellini–Ruard Manor (45 France Prešeren Street): museum headquarters, history of the regional ironworks, paleontological collection
- Kos Manor (64 Marshal Tito Street): art gallery, museum of local history
- Workers' Barracks (48 France Prešeren Street): ethnographic collection, reconstructed early-20th century workers' residential block

Located in Mojstrana:

- Slovenian Alpine Museum (49 Triglav Street): collection on the history of Slovene mountaineering, 18th century–World War II, information station of Triglav National Park

Located in Kranjska Gora:

- Liznjek Farm (64 Borovec Street): authentic Slovene alpine farmhouse, renovated into an ethnographic museum in 1983. The basement contains an exhibit on the local writer Josip Vandot and a gallery.

Located in Rateče:

- Kajžnk House (43 Rateče): renovated building preserving regional folk architecture. Exhibits on local history, handicrafts, and folk costume
