= Most na Soči =

Most na Soči Sveta Lucija ob Soči (until 1955)
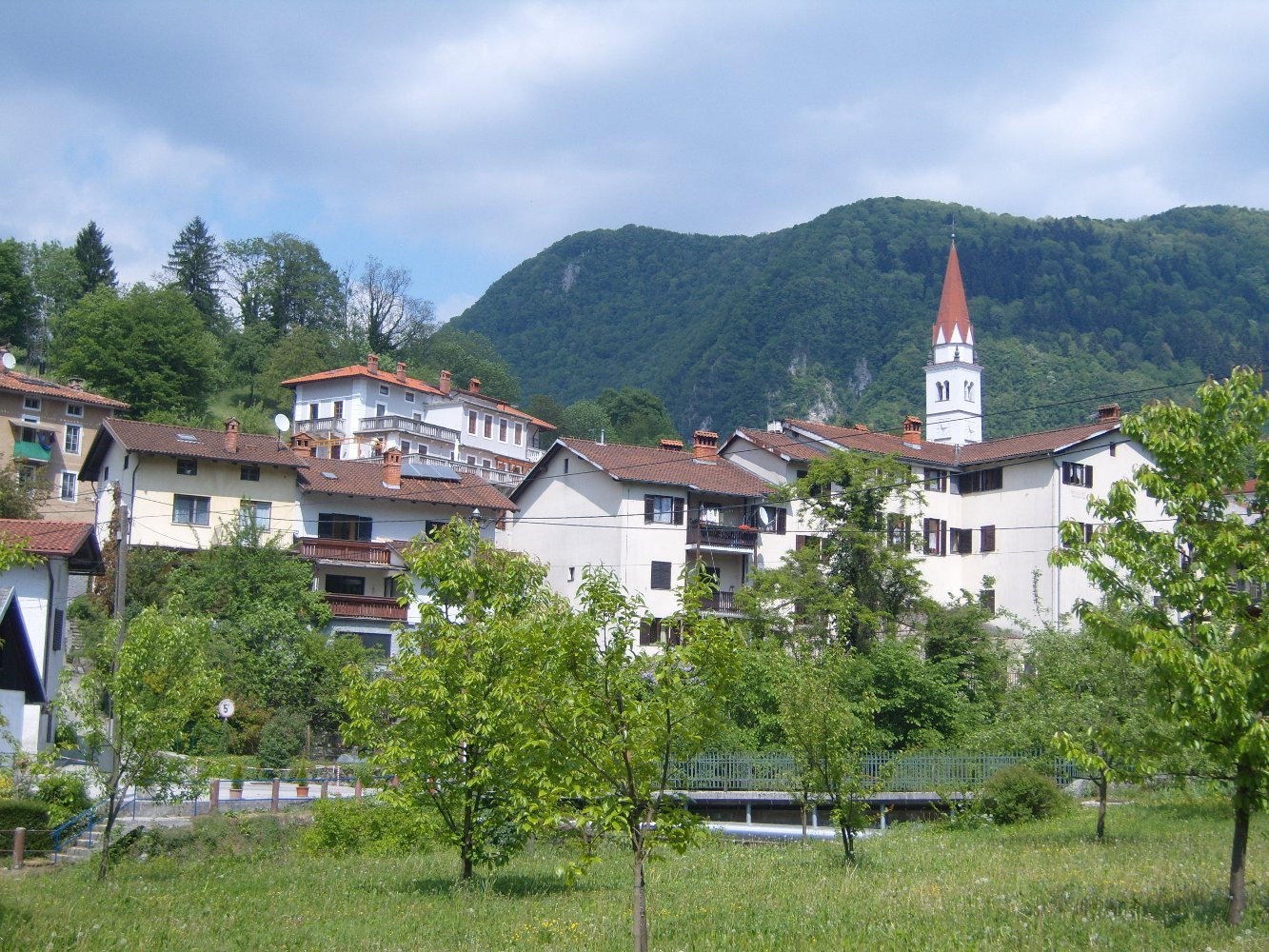

- Location in Slovenia
- Coordinates: 46°9′8.24″N 13°44′39.6″E
- Country: Slovenia
- Traditional region: Slovenian Littoral
- Statistical region: Gorizia
- Municipality: Tolmin

Area
  - Total: 1.57 km^{2} (0.61 sq mi)
- Elevation: 179 m (587 ft)

Population (2002)
  - Total: 236

Most na Soči (pronounced [ˈmoːst na ˈsoːtʃi]; formerly Sveta Lucija or Sveta Lucija na Mostu, German: Sankt Luzia) is a town in the Municipality of Tolmin in the Littoral region of Slovenia. It is located on a rocky crest above the confluence of Soča and Idrijca rivers. In the past these two riverbeds, deeply carved into the rocky slopes, provided the settlement with excellent protection from intruders. Due to the nearby Doblar hydro plant, the basins of the river were entirely inundated and below the settlement a vast reservoir was formed, which now attracts both fishermen and visitors, who can stroll along some well-kept panoramic paths.

== Name ==
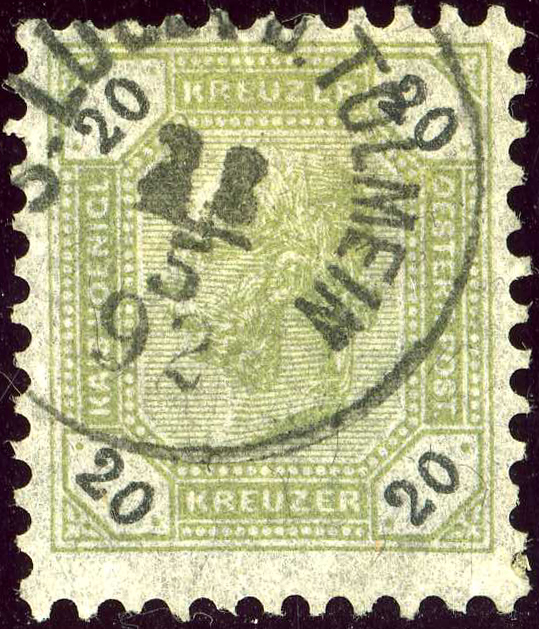
The German name S. Lucija b. Tolmein on an 1892 postmark

Most na Soči was first attested as In Ponte Sancti Mauri (literally, 'at Saint Maurus' bridge') in reference to the local church. In the 17th century, the name ad Pontem 'at the bridge' was recorded, and a church built between 1584 and 1612 was the source of the name Sveta Lucija (na Mostu) 'Saint Lucy (on the bridge)'. Under Italian administration, the settlement was known as Santa Lucia (di Tolmino) 'Saint Lucy (of Tolmin)', and after the Second World War the Slovene name Sveta Lucija ob Soči 'Saint Lucy on the Soča River' was established. Other historical names include German St. Luzia and Maurus Brücke. The name of the settlement was changed from Sveta Lucija ob Soči to Most na Soči (literally, 'bridge on the Soča River') in 1955. The name was changed on the basis of the 1948 Law on Names of Settlements and Designations of Squares, Streets, and Buildings as part of efforts by Slovenia's postwar communist government to remove religious elements from toponyms.

== History ==
Exceptional archaeological finds – more than 7,000 grave sites discovered so far – rank this location among the most important prehistoric settlements in Europe. Rich finds date back in the period from the late Bronze Age to Roman period. Most of them originate from an Iron Age community which was named the Sveta Lucija Culture. The finds are on display at many museums, i.e. in Vienna, Trieste, and Tolmin. Archeologists from the Tolmin Museum are still discovering stunning finds.

== Cultural heritage ==
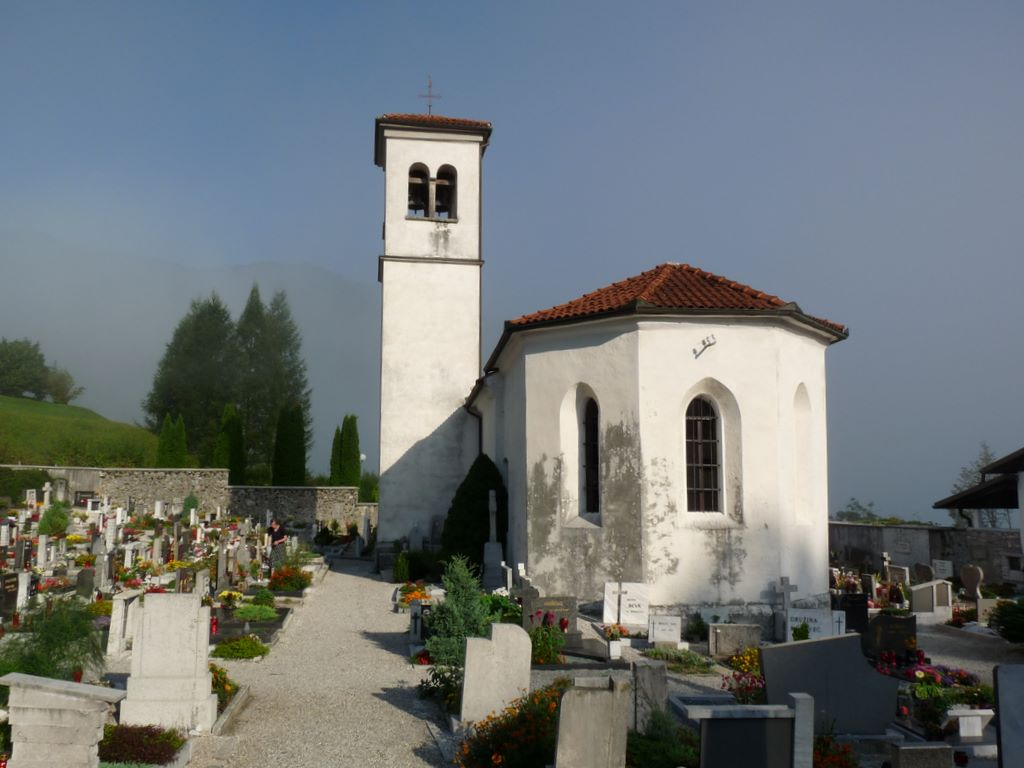
Saint Maurus's Church at the cemetery in Most na Soči

The restored and protected remains of a Roman house are located in Most na Soči. The parish church in the settlement is dedicated to Saint Lucy and belongs to the Diocese of Koper. A second church in the parish is dedicated to Saint Maurus (Slovene: sveti Maver). The first written record of the church dates from 1192. Another interesting site is a monument to soldiers from World War I at Postaja.

The birthplace of the writer Ciril Kosmač is part of the Genius Loci European program, which connects birthplaces of famous artists: Giotto, Goya, Lorca, Novalis, and Kosmač.

== Natural heritage ==
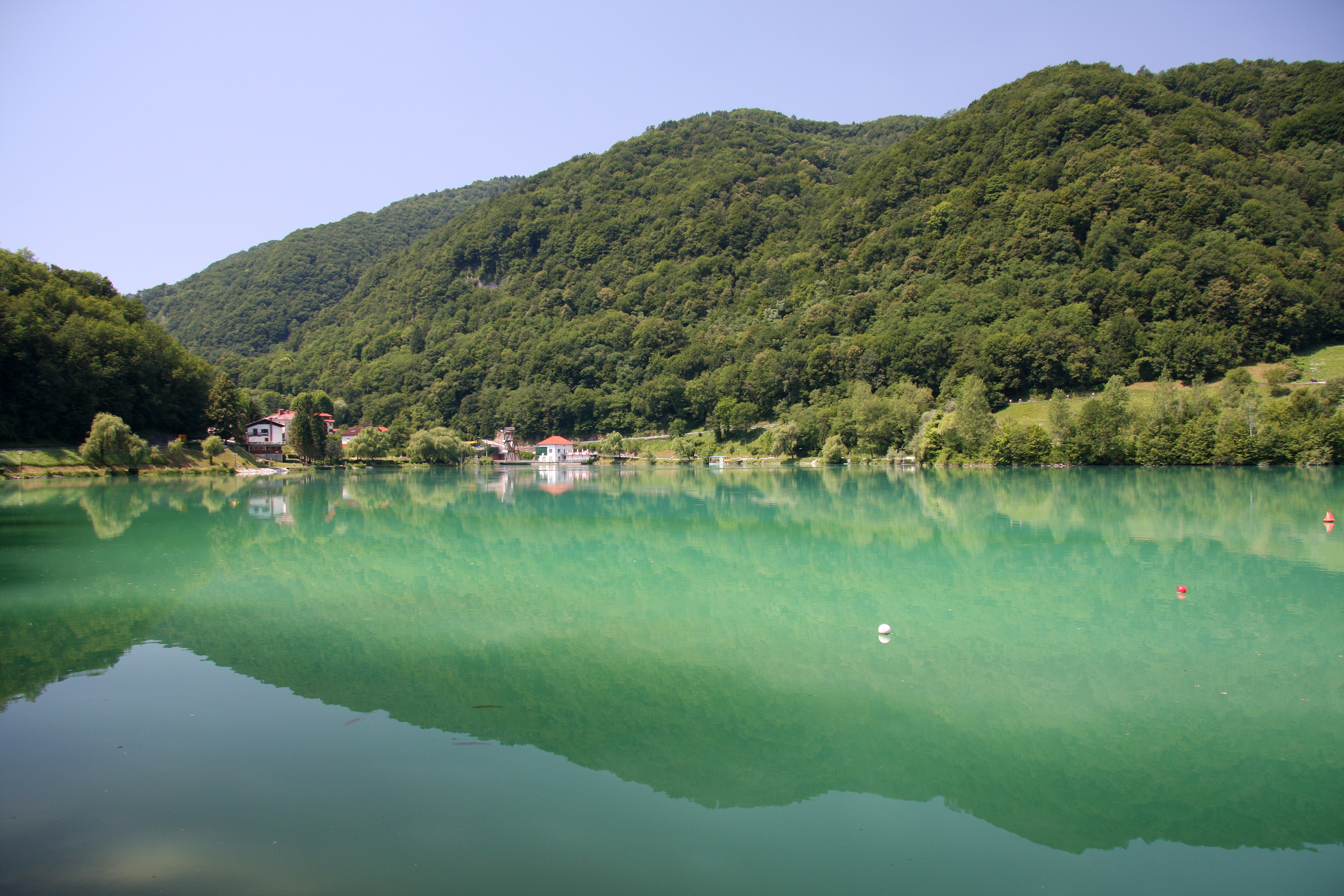
The reservoir on the Soča River in Most na Soči

The principal natural feature of Most na Soči is its lake. Although artificial, it is the same unique color as the Soča. It gives the settlement an atmosphere of tranquility and softness and offers many opportunities for recreation.

Flat limestone layers at Pod Ključem are a feature of geological interest.
