= Koper Regional Museum =

Museum in Koper, Slovenia

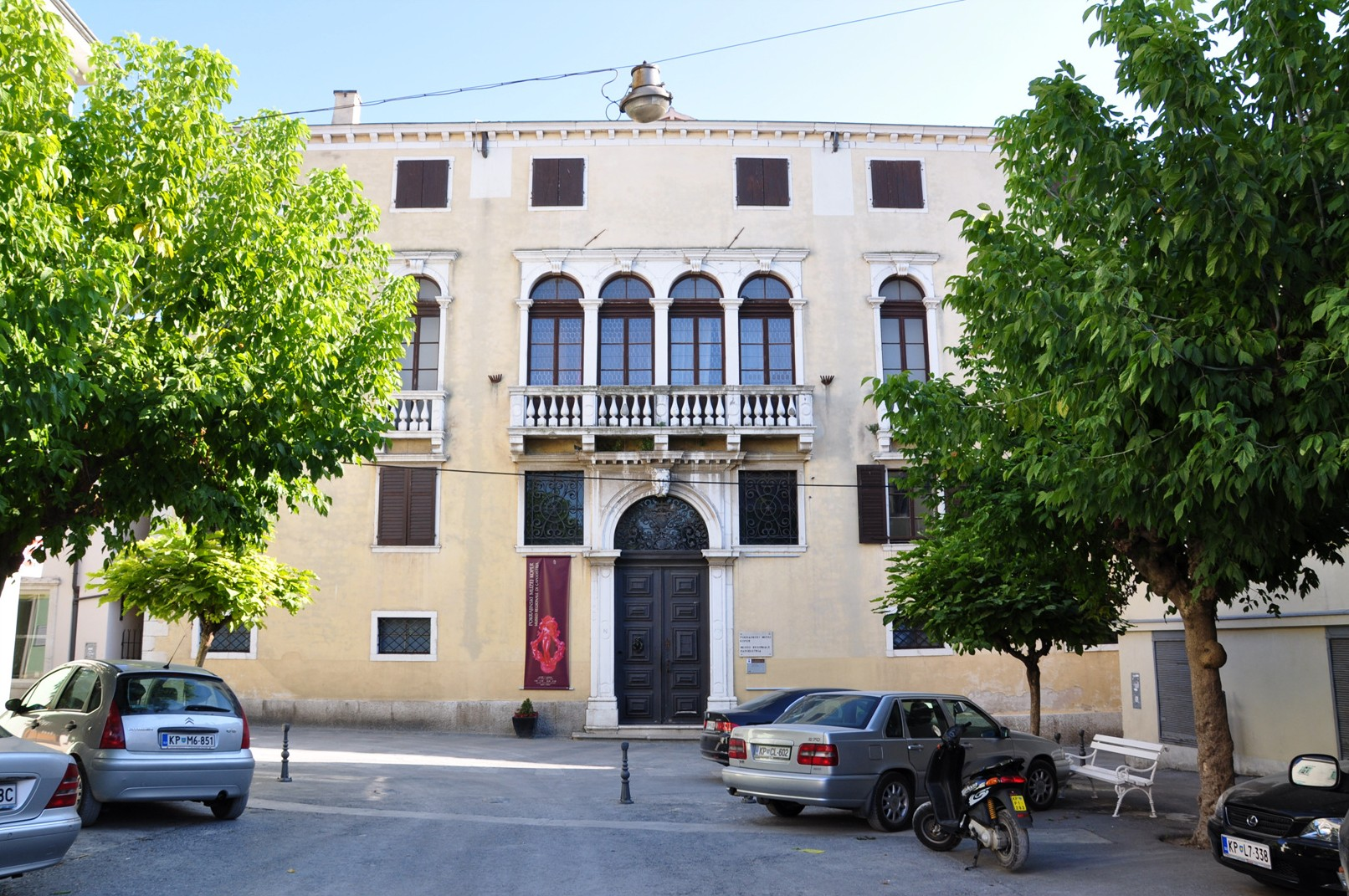
- Koper Regional Museum
- Interactive fullscreen map
- Location: Koper, Slovenia
- Coordinates: 45°32′54″N 13°43′41″E

The Koper Regional Museum (Slovene: Pokrajinski muzej Koper; Italian: Museo regionale di Capodistria) has been housed since 1954 in the spacious early 17th century Belgramoni Tacco Palace, and is responsible for the movable cultural heritage in Primorska region of Slovenia. The museum originated in 1911 as the Municipal Museum of History and Art (Museo Civico di Storia e d'Arte). At its centenary in 2011, the museum opened a new permanent exhibition Between the Serenissima, Napoleon and the Habsburgs and enriched its collection.

== History ==
The first initiatives to establish a museum in Koper-Capodistria took place as early as the late 18th century, but the main push for its foundation was provided by the first exhibition of the Istrian Region in Koper (Prima Esposizione Provinciale Istriana) in 1910. One year later the then Municipality of Koper-Capodistria established the Municipal Museum of History and Art (Museo Civico di Storia e d'Arte), and after the First World War the spacious early 17th century Belgramoni Tacco Palace building was set aside for use as a museum.

During the Second World War, the permanent collection was seriously impaired when many precious works of art were evacuated to Friuli (Villa Manin in Passariano). When 'Zone B' was incorporated into Slovenia in 1954, the museum was renamed the District Museum, and in 1967 its name was changed to Koper Regional Museum (Museo Regionale di Capodistria). From 1981 to 1985, the museum's central building was completely renovated and this made it possible to expand the museum's activities and to rearrange its collections.

== Mission ==
The museum has a wide scope of coverage, mainly concerning Primorska region: archaeology, history, art and cultural history, ethnology and cultural heritage of coastal and karst areas. Important attention is being paid to participation in cultural, scientific and educational establishments and associations, with particular emphasis on cooperation with Slovenian institutions abroad and Italian and Croatian institutions in Istria and Dalmatia.

Today, the parent museum building presents an archaeological collection and collections covering the history of culture, art and history of Istria from its very beginning to the end of the 19th century. The conservation restoration workshop preserves the museum material and organizes the technical days and workshops at the temporary exhibitions in the context of educational activities.

== Venues ==
The museum manages three satellites; in 1983 the Ethnological Collection of Koper Regional Museum was established as an independent branch, and in 1990 the museum also assumed responsibility for the Tartini Memorial Room, housed in the Piran birthplace of composer and violinist Giuseppe Tartini. The third satellite collection was opened in Prem Castle in 2008, presenting castles and building sites in the Reka river basin.

== Collections ==
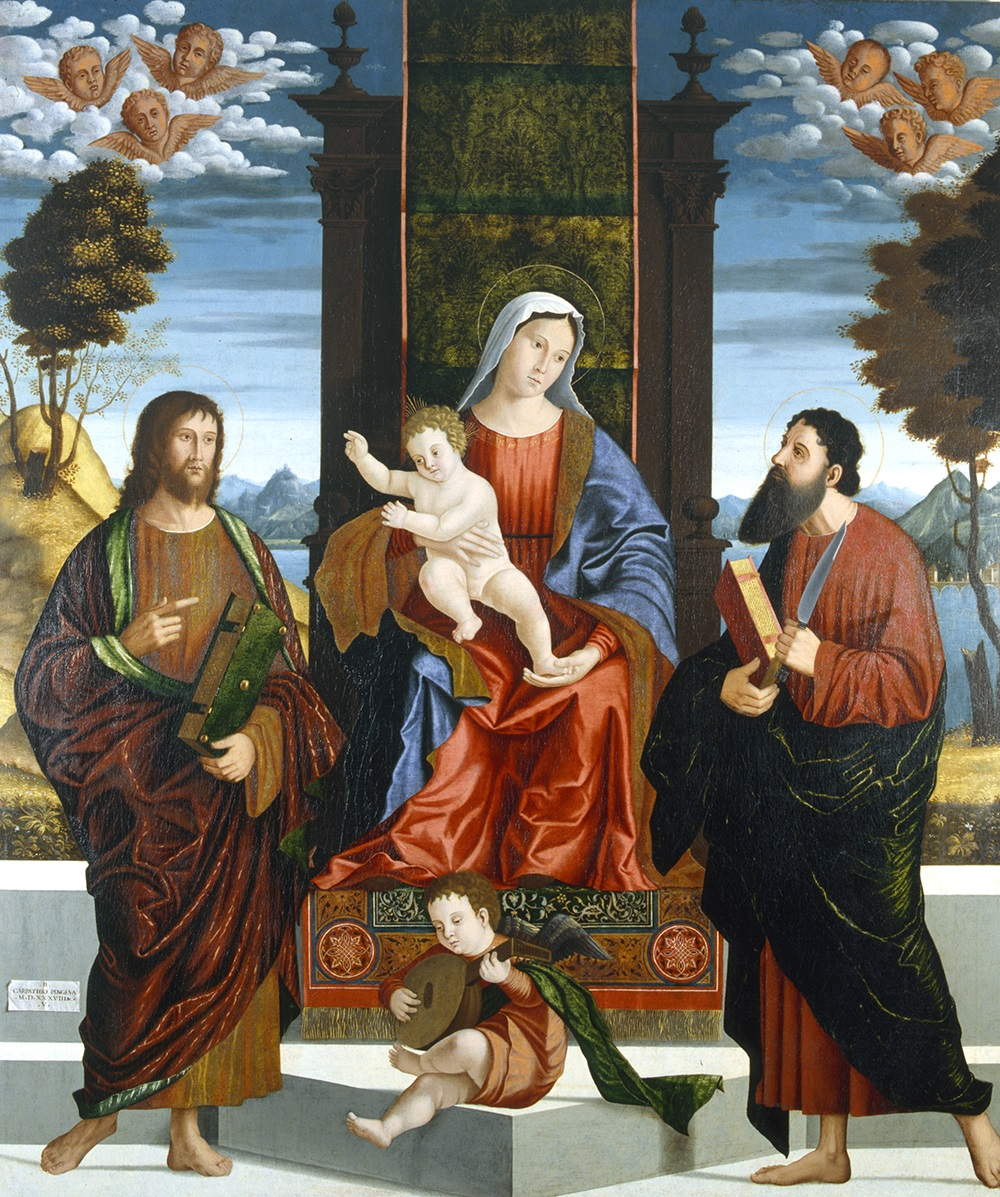
Virgin between Saints Bartholomew and Thomas by Benedetto Carpaccio

The recent permanent exhibition Between the Serenissima, Napoleon and the Habsburgs covers the period from 16h to 19th century and presents some of the most prominent residents such as the bishops Paolo Naldini and Pier Paolo Vergerio jr. (1498–1565), Santorio Santorio (1561–1636), a doctor and researcher who invented the thermometer, and the writer and historian Giovanni Rinaldo (1720–1795). The display includes the weapon collection, presented for the first time.

Both the lapidary collection and the open air collection in the palace garden present the oldest material culture of the coastal and karst areas. The culture and art history collection consists of sculptures, paintings and arts and crafts products, arranged in chronological order and by theme, from early medieval sculptures with guilloche ornamentation (9th–11th centuries) to a fresco copy of The Dance of Death from Hrastovlje and inscriptions in the Glagolitic alphabet.

Pinakoteka presents paintings, sculptures and products of the arts and crafts, complemented by 17th- and 18th-century furnishings from the Venetian cultural area, while historical material from the 18th and 19th centuries presents some eminent figures from the fields of medicine, pharmacy, the Enlightenment and political life in the Koper area.

In the pavilion along the museum's lapidary, a collection of the recent history of the Southern Primorska region is presented, the fight for survival in Brkini, Slovenska Bistrica and Istra, portrayed also on Rapallo painting by Tone Kralj, while at Gramsci Square an ethnological collection is on permanent display.

== Exhibitions ==
The museum presents several own and travelling exhibitions through the year. In 1995–1998 an exhibition of recent history was assembled in the pavilion adjacent to the museum's lapidary collection, presenting the national and political struggle of the Istrian Slovenes and people from Primorje (the coast land) at the turn of the 20th century. This exhibition covers the periods from the national awakening of the Istrian Slovenes before the First World War up to the incorporation of Zone B of the Free Territory of Trieste and the diplomatic struggle for the incorporation of the area into the Slovene homeland (London Memorandum 1954).

In February 2010 a joint exhibition of Koper Museum and several other Slovenian museums, together with a Town Museum Trieste With a Fibula into Fable is being planned. The exhibition presents brooches which were found in Western Slovenian area, adjacent to the Friuli region. It follows the development of fibulae in that area from prehistoric to Roman times and the early Middle Ages.

== See also ==
- Belgramoni-Tacco Palace
