= Pleterje Charterhouse =

Carthusian monastery in Slovenia

Coordinates: 45°49′N 15°21′E

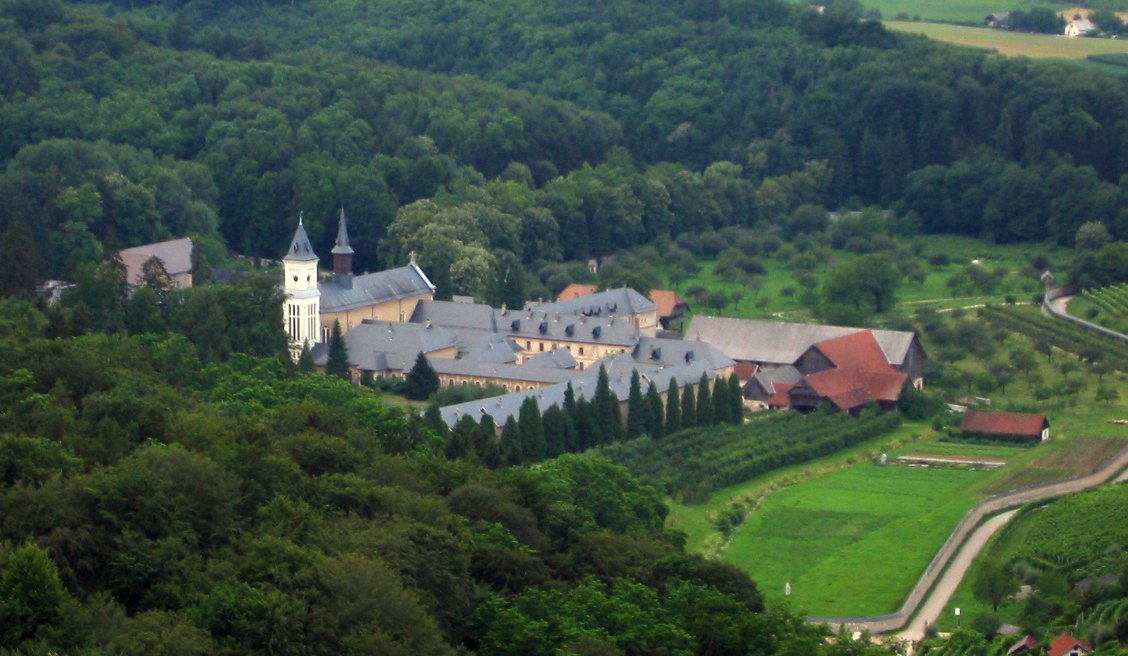
Pleterje Charterhouse

Pleterje Charterhouse (Slovene: Kartuzija Pleterje; German: Kartause Plettriach, also Pleterjach, Pletriach, or Pleteriach) is a Carthusian monastery, or charterhouse, in the village of Drča near Šentjernej in Slovenia, the only extant monastery of that order in the country.

== History ==
=== First foundation ===
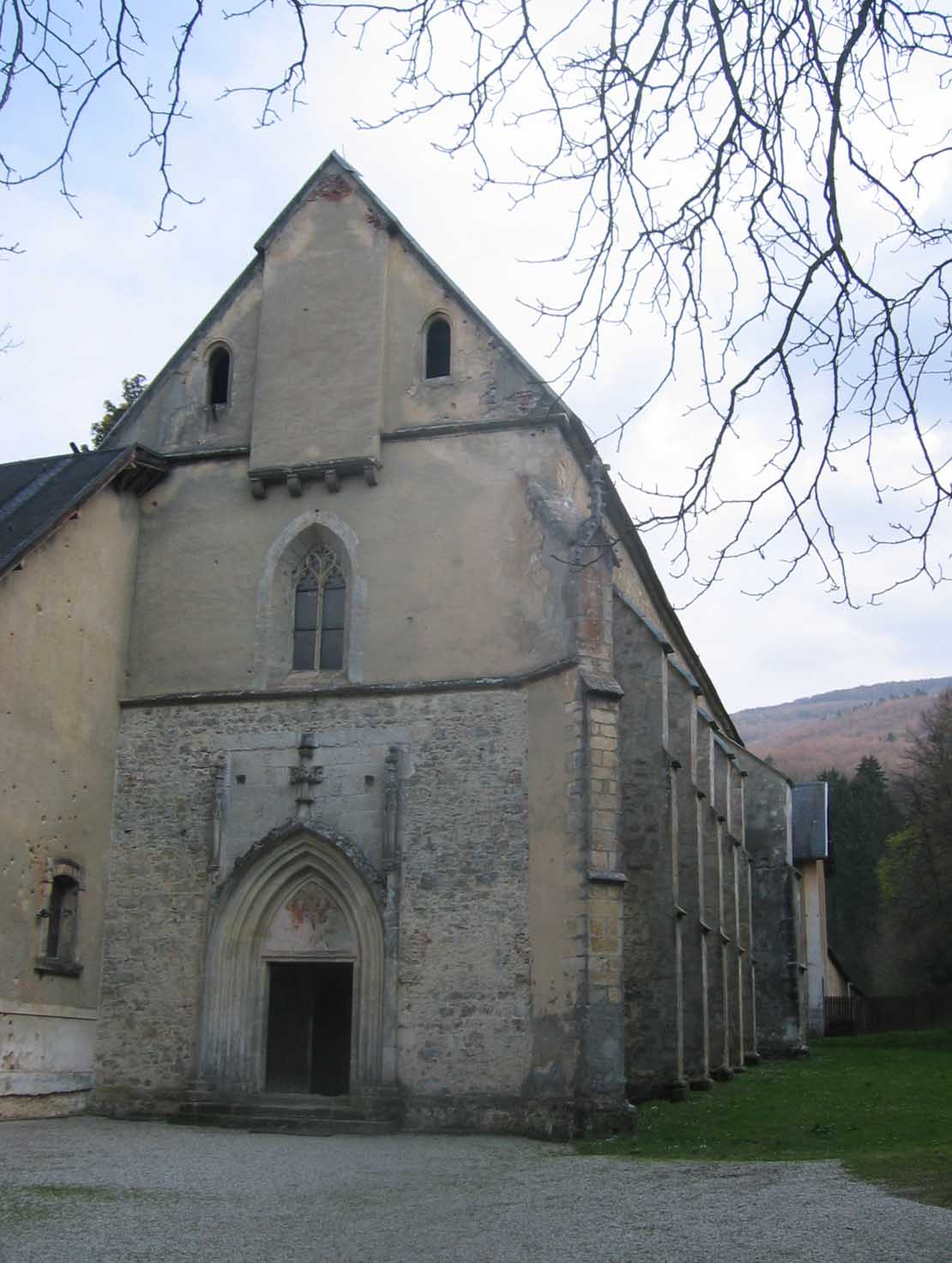
Pleterje Charterhouse: the medieval church

The monastery, situated in a valley at the foot of the Gorjanci Mountains, was founded in 1403 by Count Hermann II of Celje, and its construction completed by 1407.

The Austrian mystic and theologian Nikolaus Kempf was prior here from 1447 to 1451 and again from 1462 to 1467.

In 1471 an Ottoman raid destroyed the buildings, which were reconstructed in a much stronger and more easily defensible manner.

After a long period of decline Archduke Ferdinand II of Inner Austria gave the monastery in 1595 to the Jesuits of Ljubljana. When the Jesuits were suppressed in 1772, Pleterje became state property. In 1839 it passed into private hands.

=== Second foundation ===
In 1899 the Carthusians reacquired the site and began construction of a new monastery, which was completed five years later.

During World War II, the charterhouse suffered severe damage when it was set on fire by Communist Partisans on February 21, 1943. The fire destroyed 17 monastic cells.

== Present day ==
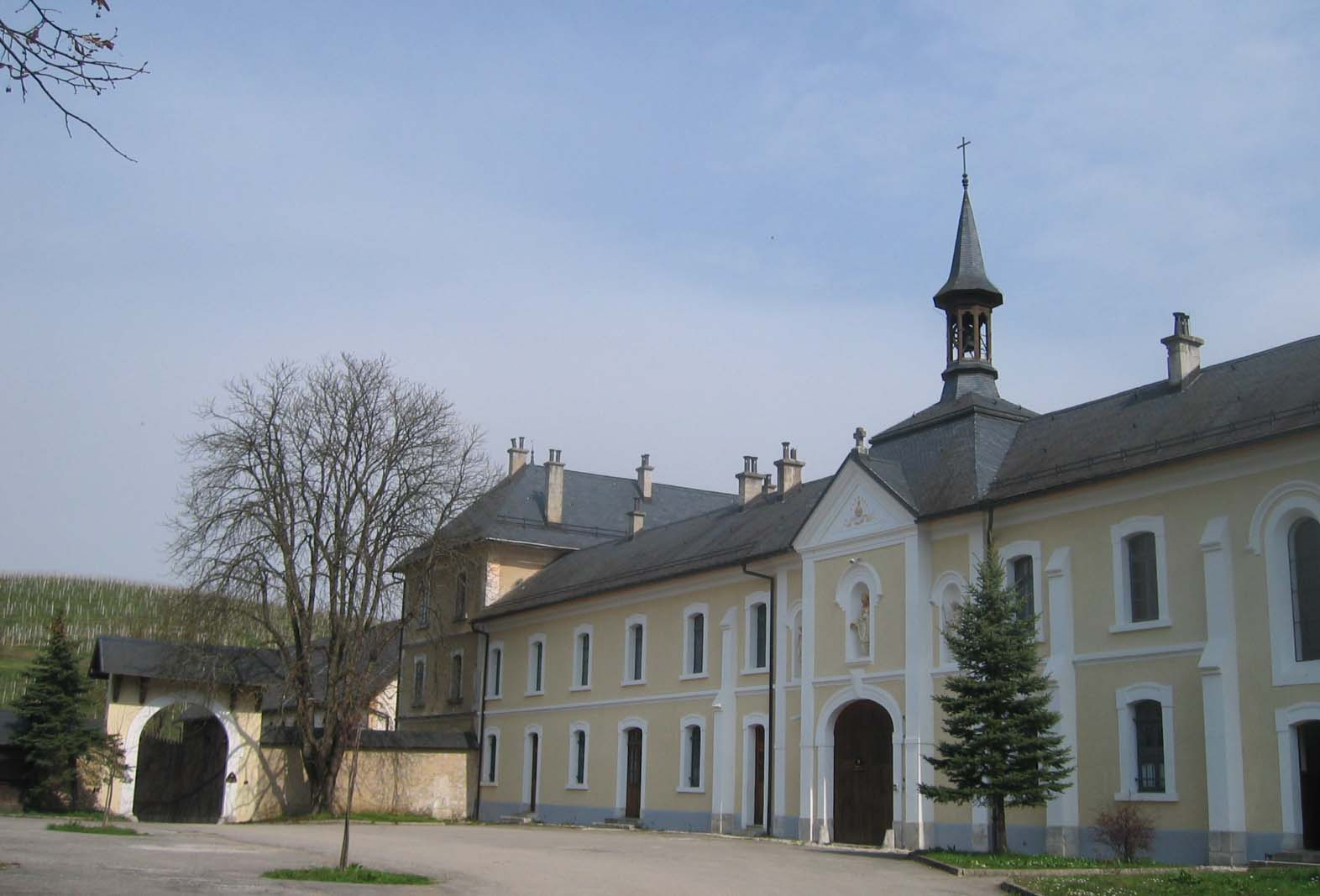
Pleterje Charterhouse: monastery buildings

The charterhouse has remained a Carthusian monastery to this day. The buildings date from the second foundation in the late 19th century, except for the Gothic church, dedicated to the Holy Trinity, which survives from the earlier monastery.

=== Produce ===
The monks cultivate 30 hectares of land, mostly for fruit and honey, which they sell, and from which they also produce wine, fruit spirits (especially pear brandy), mead and beeswax candles.

=== Art collection ===
The community at Pleterje are the owners of a significant collection of several dozen paintings, which for the sake of the peace of the community have been deposited on permanent loan for exhibition in a gallery in Kostanjevica na Krki. The paintings date from the 17th and 18th centuries, and are attributed to Flemish, French, Italian and German artists. They seem mostly to have reached Pleterje with refugee monks from Bosserville Charterhouse in Lorraine, who were given shelter in Pleterje in 1904.

=== Museums ===
The monastery accommodates a display of items from the collections of the Dolenjska Museum of local history, and on part of its lands stands the Pleterje Charterhouse Open Air Museum of typical Slovenian peasant buildings.
