= Kajžnk House =

Slovenian ethnographic museum

Coordinates: 46°29′51.14″N 13°42′58.09″E

The Kajžnk House or Kajžnik House (Slovene: Kajžnkova hiša, Kajžnikova hiša) is an ethnographic museum in a restored Alpine farmhouse in the village of Rateče, in the northwest Slovenian Municipality of Kranjska Gora.

The house is a well-preserved example of rural architecture, and was long the home of a typical middle-class farming family. Notable feature include the stonework door casing, as well as the frescoes of St. Florian and sundial on the exterior walls.

The Municipality of Kranjska Gora purchased the fire-damaged property in 1995; with the assistance of the Carniolan Agency for the Protection of Cultural Heritage, renovations were completed in 2004. The following year, the Upper Sava Museum began establishing an ethnological collection, focusing on folk customs, dress, and handicrafts of the Rateče area.

The house is furnished with authentic period furniture; two mannequins display several rotating examples of traditional regional costume. The attic contains an ethnological archive, including a rare 80-year-old film recording of village life.
