= Sveti Primož na Pohorju =

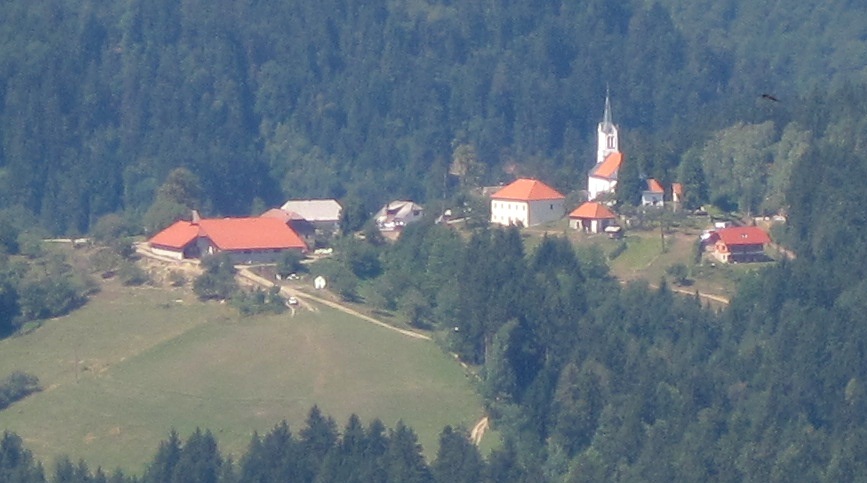

- Location in Slovenia
- Coordinates: 46°33′4.42″N 15°9′57.22″E
- Country: Slovenia
- Traditional region: Styria
- Statistical region: Carinthia
- Municipality: Vuzenica

Area
  - Total: 16.46 km^{2} (6.36 sq mi)
- Elevation: 679.7 m (2,230 ft)

Population (2020)
  - Total: 332
  - Density: 20.2/km^{2} (52.2/sq mi)

Sveti Primož na Pohorju (pronounced [ˈsʋèːti ˈpɾìːmɔʃ na ˈpóːxɔɾju]) is a settlement in the Municipality of Vuzenica in northern Slovenia. It lies south of the town of Vuzenica, a dispersed settlement in the western Pohorje Hills. The settlement, and the municipality, are included in the Carinthia Statistical Region, which is in the Slovenian portion of the historical Duchy of Styria.

The local parish church, from which the settlement gets its name, is dedicated to Saint Primus and belongs to the Roman Catholic Archdiocese of Maribor. It was built in 1789 near the site of an earlier Gothic building mentioned in written documents dating to 1436.
