= Drča =

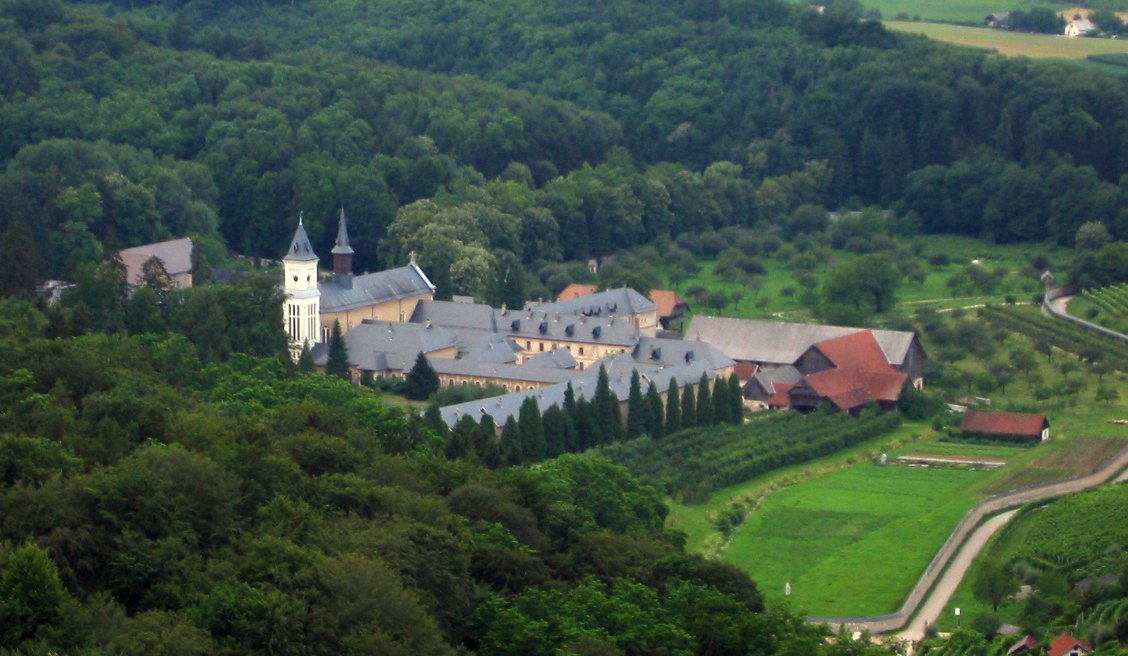
- Pleterje Charterhouse in Drča

- Location in Slovenia
- Coordinates: 45°49′4.54″N 15°21′46.84″E
- Country: Slovenia
- Traditional region: Lower Carniola
- Statistical region: Southeast Slovenia
- Municipality: Šentjernej

Area
  - Total: 1.34 km^{2} (0.52 sq mi)
- Elevation: 246.2 m (808 ft)

Population (2002)
  - Total: 28
- Postal code: 8310

Drča (pronounced [ˈdəɾtʃa]) is a village in the foothills of the Gorjanci Mountains in the Municipality of Šentjernej in southeastern Slovenia. The area is part of the traditional region of Lower Carniola. It is now included in the Southeast Slovenia Statistical Region.

It is best known as the location of the Pleterje Charterhouse, a monastery founded in 1407 with a walled enclosure that includes a Gothic church, dedicated to the Holy Trinity and a newer part of the monastery including its library, built between 1899 and 1904.
