= Loka pri Žusmu =

- Location in Slovenia
- Coordinates: 46°9′34.31″N 15°30′50.53″E
- Country: Slovenia
- Traditional region: Styria
- Statistical region: Savinja
- Municipality: Šentjur

Area
  - Total: 8.92 km^{2} (3.44 sq mi)
- Elevation: 246.9 m (810 ft)

Population (2020)
  - Total: 374
  - Density: 41.9/km^{2} (109/sq mi)

Loka pri Žusmu (pronounced [ˈloːka pɾi ˈʒuːsmu]) is a village, and one of the most populous settlements, in the Municipality of Šentjur, eastern Slovenia. The settlement, and the entire municipality, are included in the Savinja Statistical Region, which is in the Slovenian portion of the historical Duchy of Styria.

The local church is dedicated to Saint Leopold and belongs to the Parish of Žusem. It was built between 1870 and 1871.
