= Trupejevo Poldne =

Mountain in the countries of Slovenia and Austria

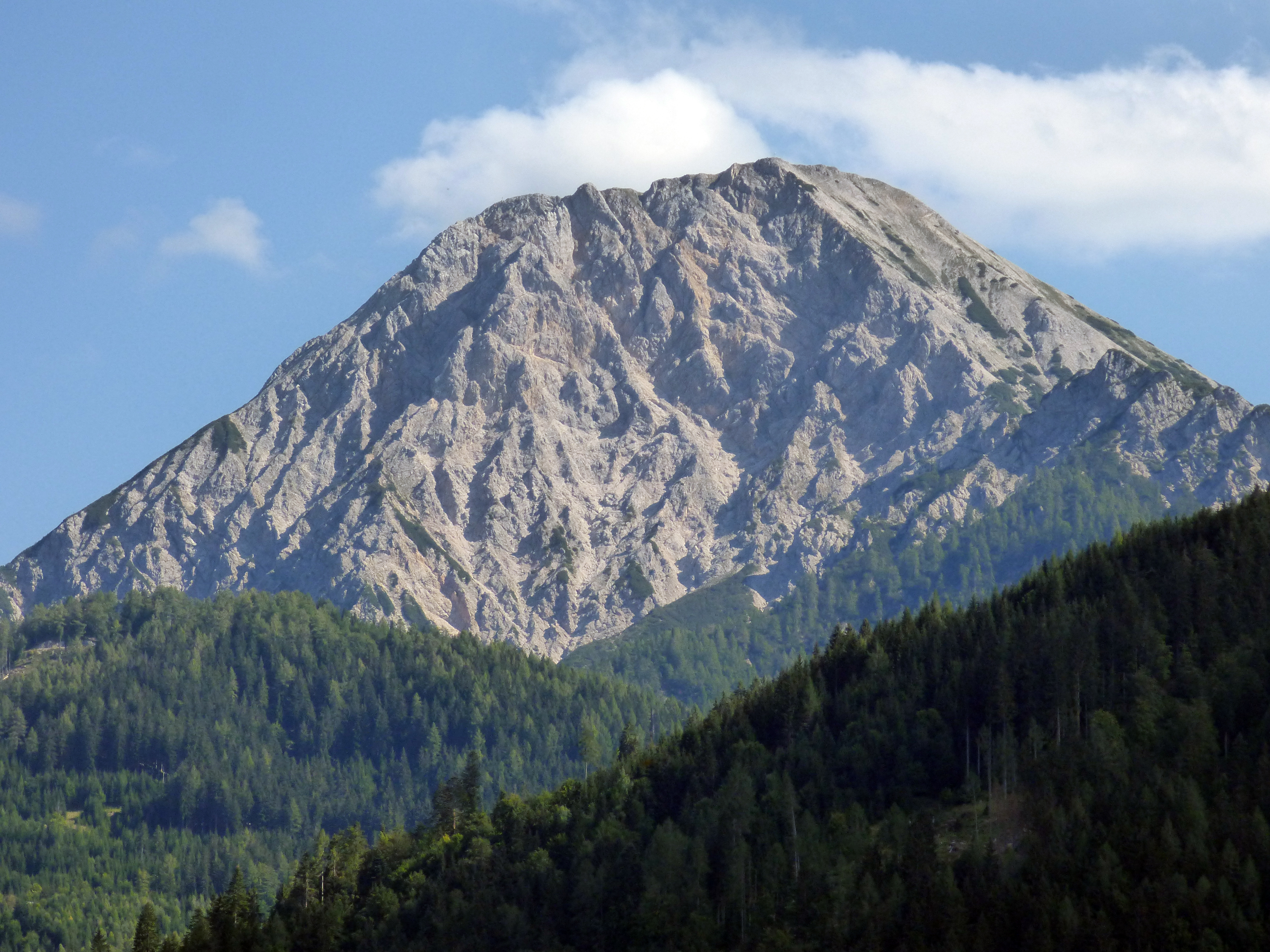

Highest point
- Elevation: 1,931 m (6,335 ft)
- Coordinates: 46°30′48″N 13°51′16″E

Geography
- Location within Slovenia
- Location: Slovenia – Austria
- Parent range: Karawanks

Trupejevo Poldne (1931 m) (German: Techantinger Mittagskogel) is a peak in the Western Karawanks, on the border between Slovenia and Austria. From the Slovene side, it is accessible from the settlement of Gozd–Martuljek via Srednji vrh. From the Austrian side a road from the village of Tetchanting, south of Villach, from which it gets its German name, leads to mountain pastures under the peak. It gets its Slovene name from the Trupej (German: Truppe) farmstead to the north of the summit, on the Austrian side. It is visited by hikers and is also suitable for ski touring in winter and spring.

The summit offers nice views across the Upper Sava Valley towards Špik in the Julian Alps on the Slovene side and into Carinthia on the Austrian side. Neighbouring peaks in the Karawanks include Maloško Poldne / Mallestiger Mittagskogel (1828 m) and Kepa/Mittagskogel (2143 m) to the east and Mojstrovica (1816 m) and Visoki Kurji vrh (1828 m) to the southeast.
