= Hrušica, Jesenice =

Hrušica
- Location in Slovenia
- Coordinates: 46°26′45.25″N 14°0′46.76″E
- Country: Slovenia
- Traditional region: Upper Carniola
- Statistical region: Upper Carniola
- Municipality: Jesenice
- Elevation: 590.7 m (1,938 ft)

Population (2002)
  - Total: 1,843

Hrušica (pronounced [ˈxɾuːʃitsa], German: Birnbaum) is a settlement 3 kilometres (1.9 mi) west of Jesenice along the main road to Kranjska Gora in the Municipality of Jesenice in the Upper Carniola region of Slovenia.

== Geography ==
Hrušica lies above the left bank of the Sava River below Hrušica Peak (Slovene: Hruški vrh, 1,176 m [3,858 ft]) in the Karawanks to the north, and Mount Kisovec (1,289 m [4,229 ft]) and the Mežakla Plateau to the south. Dobršnik Creek, which has its source below Hrušica Peak, flows through the western part of the settlement. The Hrušica Pasture (Slovene: Hruševska planina or Hruška planina, 1,207 metres [3,960 ft]) and Petelin Pasture (1,400 m [4,600 ft]) lie above Hrušica in the Karawanks.

== History ==
In 1906 the 7,976-metre-long (26,168 ft) two-rail track Karawanks railway tunnel was built at Hrušica and in 1991 the 7,864-metre-long (25,801 ft) road tunnel was completed.

=== Mass graves ===
Hrušica is the site of three mass graves from the period immediately after the Second World War. All of the graves contain the remains of Home Guard prisoners of war who were repatriated from Austria after the war and murdered. Each site contains the remains of an unknown number of victims. The Hrušica No. 56 Mass Grave (Slovene: Grobišče za hišo Hrušica 56) is located behind the house at Huršica no. 56. The Hrušica 1 Mass Grave (Grobišče Hrušica 1) lies 40 metres (130 ft) east of the house at Hrušica no. 83, and the Hrušica 2 Mass Grave (Grobišče Hrušica 2) lies on the slope above it.

== Notable people ==
Notable people that were born or lived in Hrušica include:

- Anže Kopitar (born 1987), NHL player
- Stanko Klinar (1933–2023), translator and linguist
- Ivan Krivec (a.k.a. Pavle) (1906–1944), Partisan and communist party secretary
