= Rožca =

Mountain pass between Slovenia and Austria

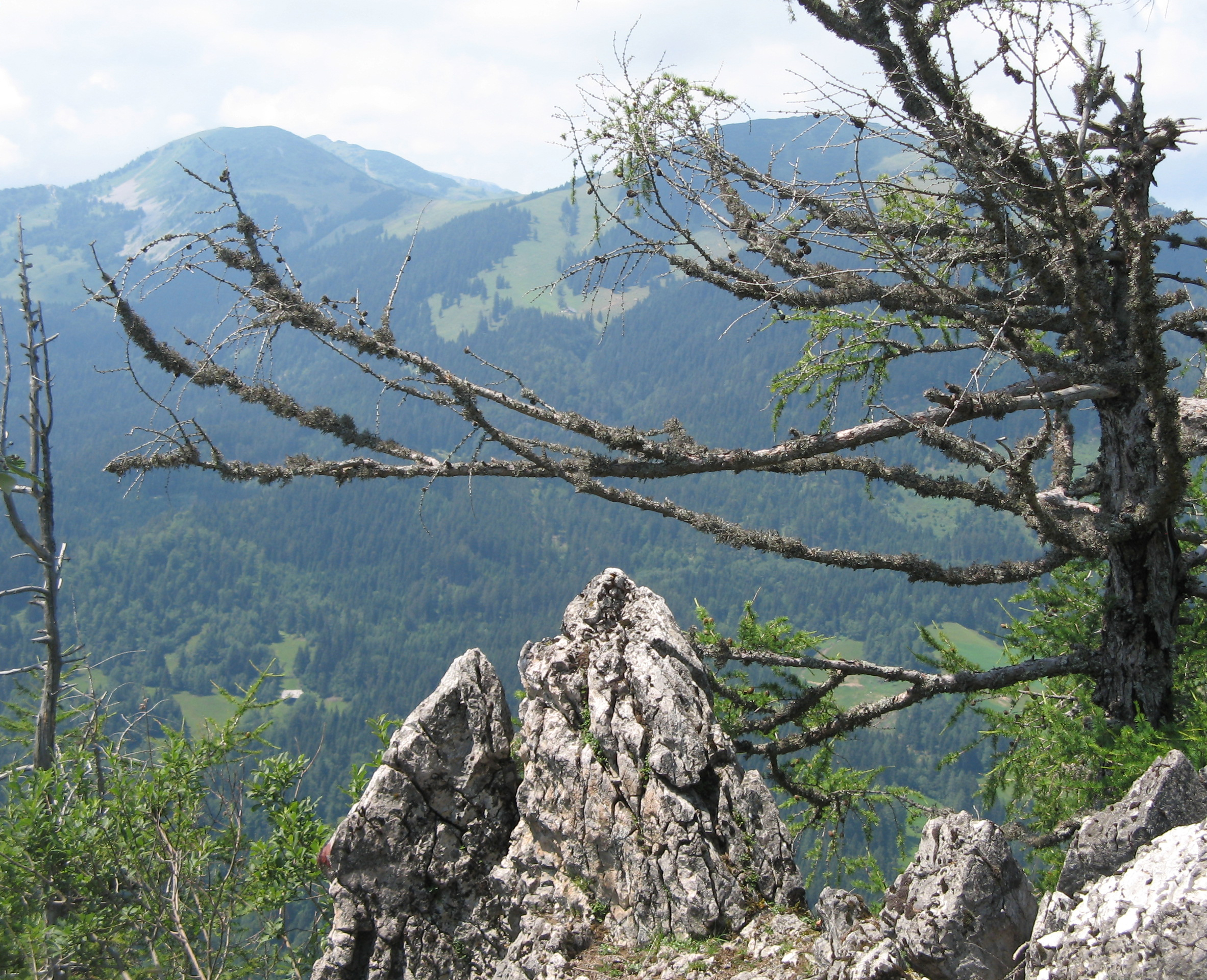
- View towards Rožca from Black Peak (Črni vrh)

Highest point
- Elevation: 1,587 m (5,207 ft)
- Coordinates: 46°28′50″N 14°1′10″E

Geography
- Location within Alps
- Location: Slovenia
- Parent range: Karawanks

Rožca (in older sources also Rožčica; German: Rosenbachsattel) is a grassy high-elevation mountain pass over the western Karawanks. The saddle is located between Hrušica Peak (Slovene: Hruški vrh) and Mount Klek, and straddles the border between Slovenia and Austria, above the town of Jesenice. Its slopes serve as sheep pastures.
