= Bodental =

Valley in Austria

Coordinates: 46.480°N 14.232°E

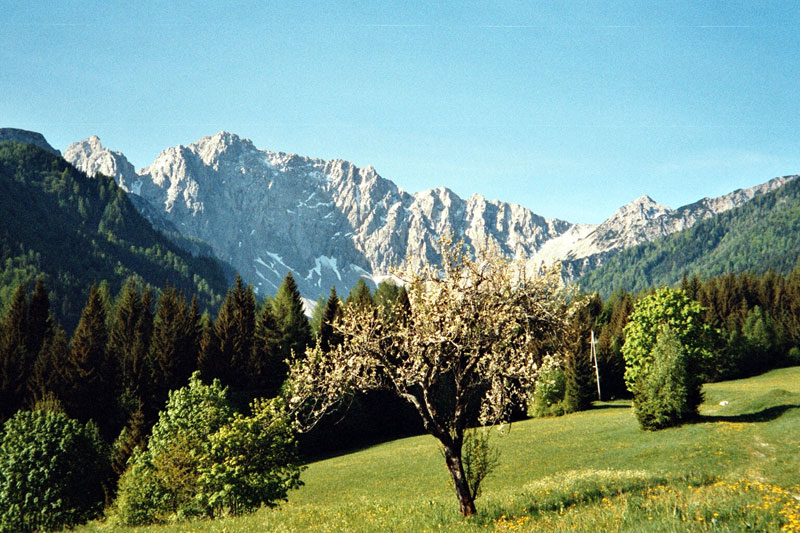
Valley closure from Schoschelz

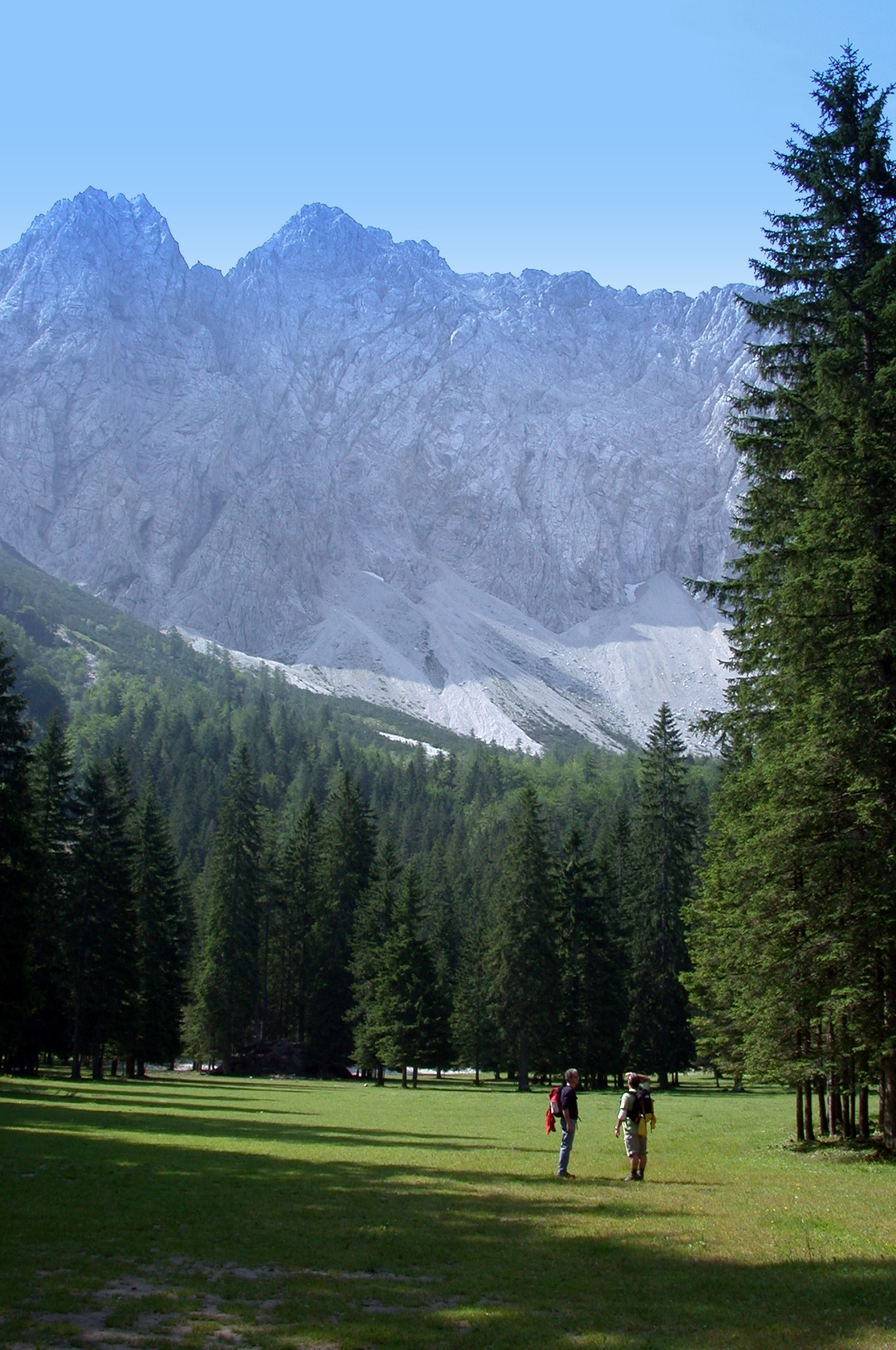
Märchenwiese (Fairytale Meadow) with the Vertatscha

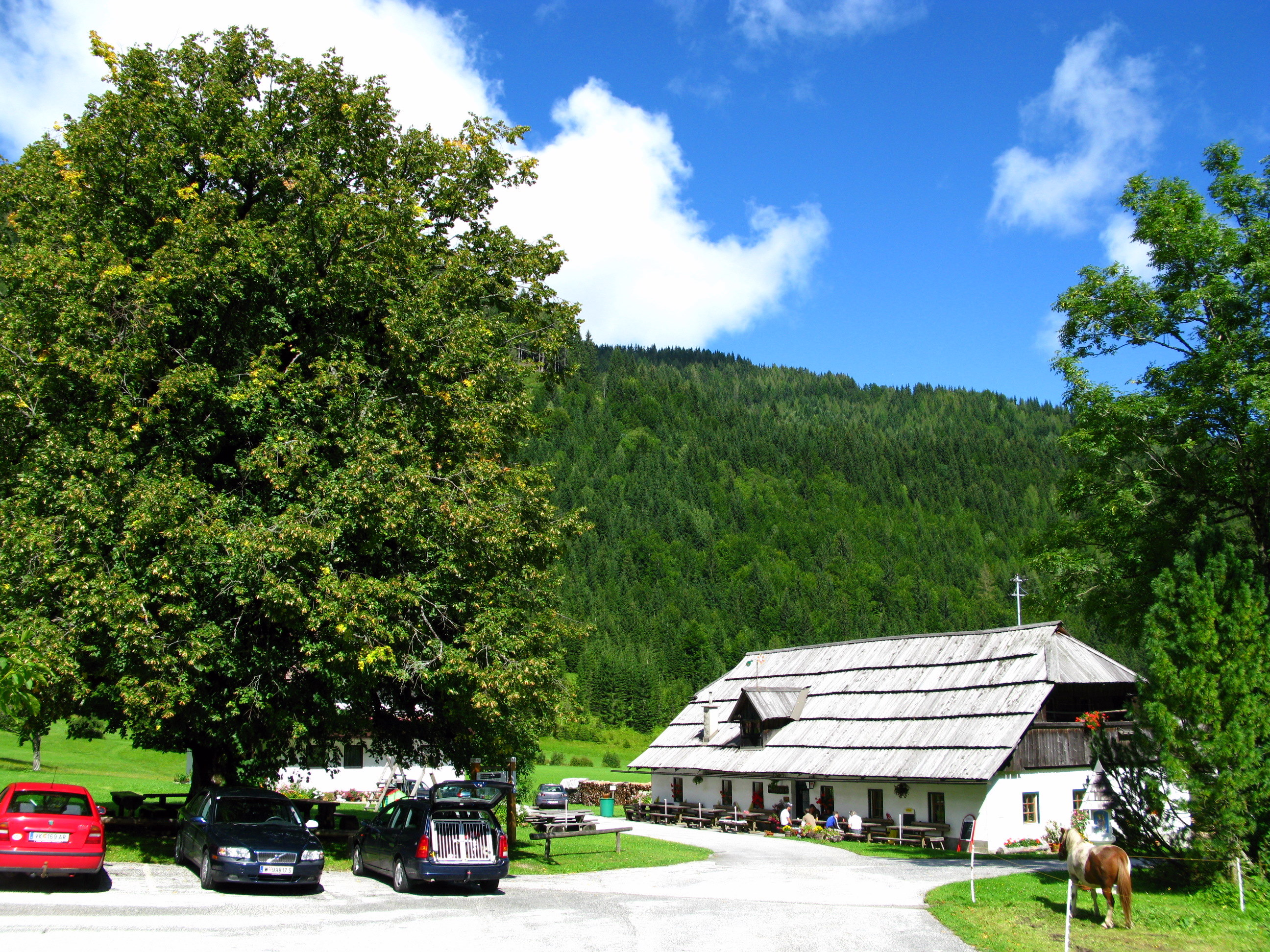
Gasthaus Bodenbauer, Summer 2008

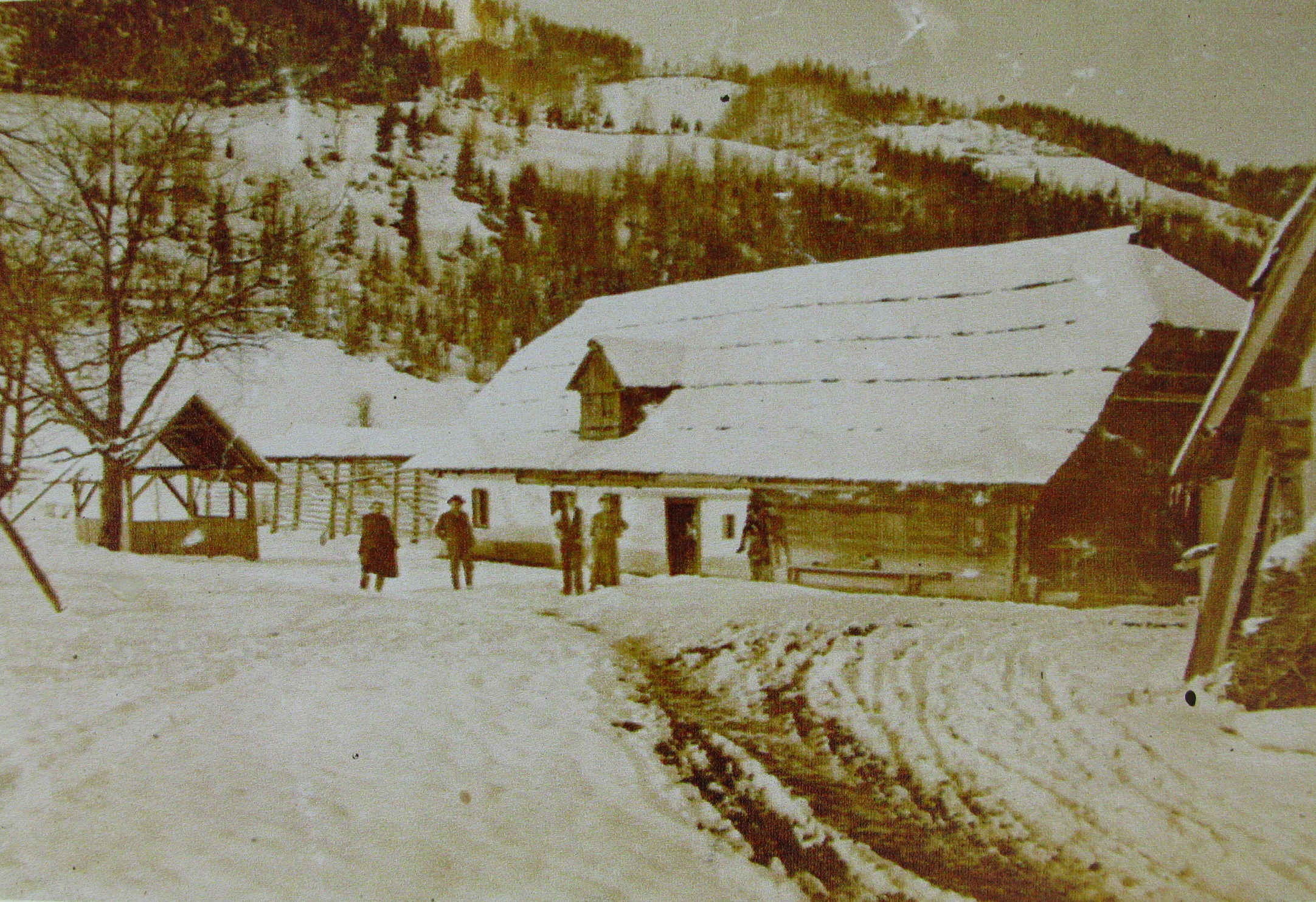
Taverne Bodenbauer, Late Autumn 1910

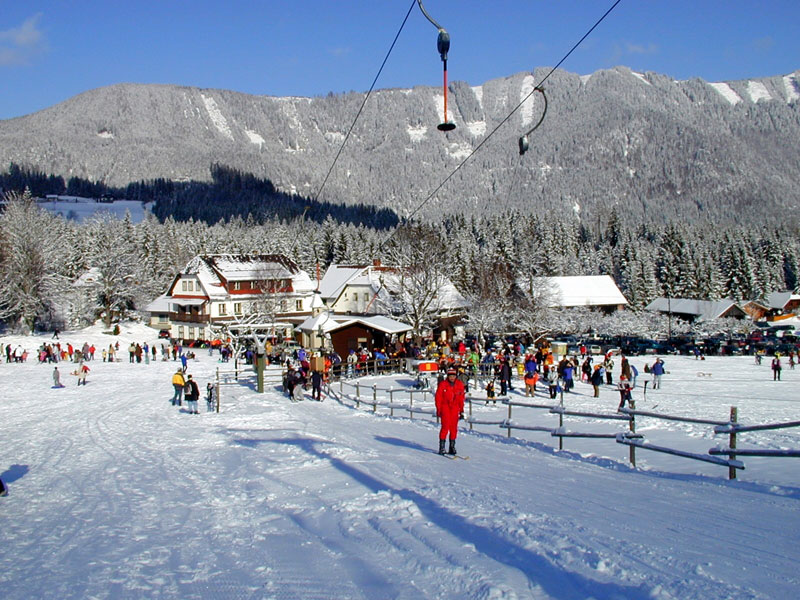
Ski piste at Sereinig

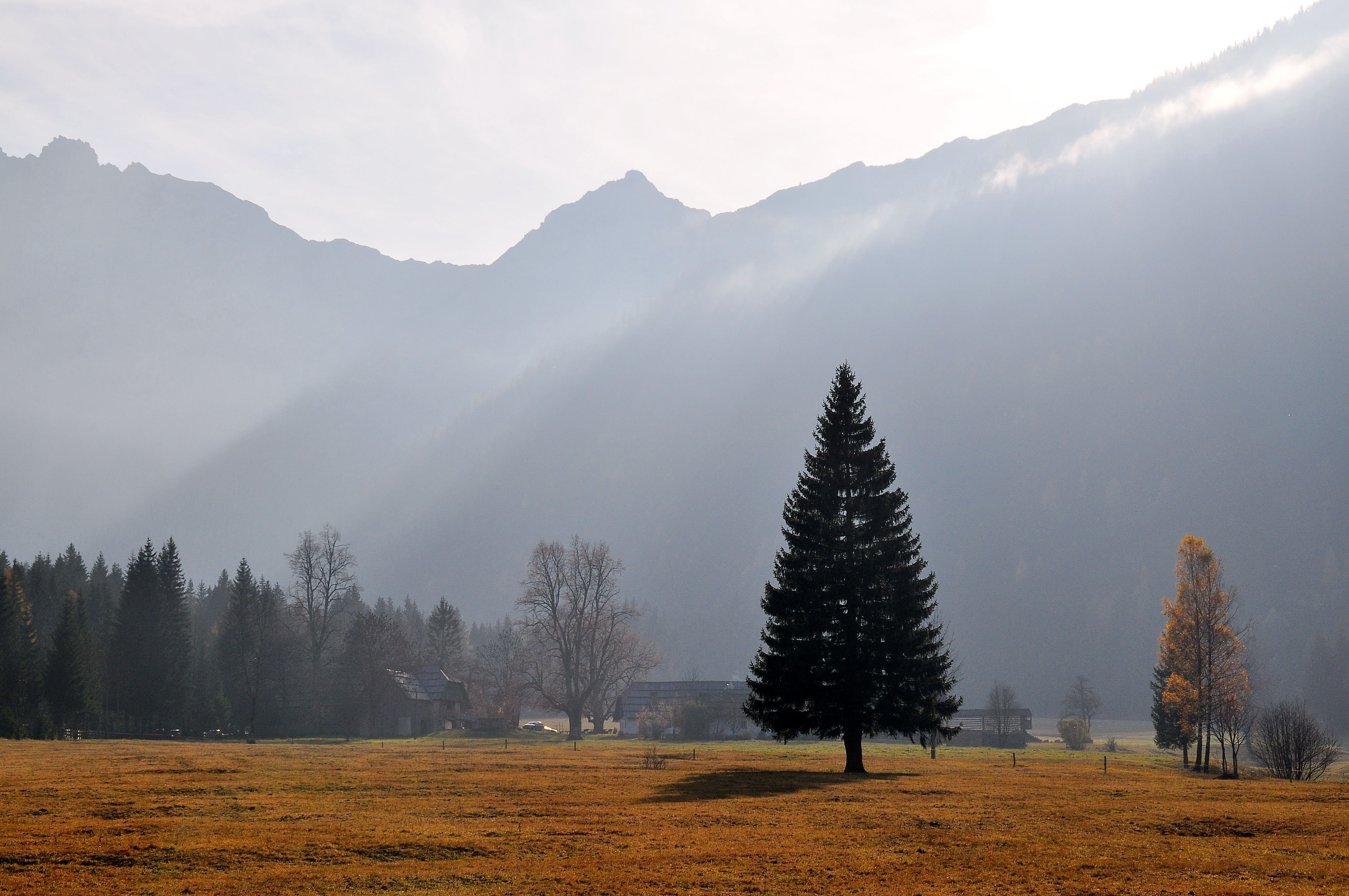
Autumnal Bodental at Bodenbauer

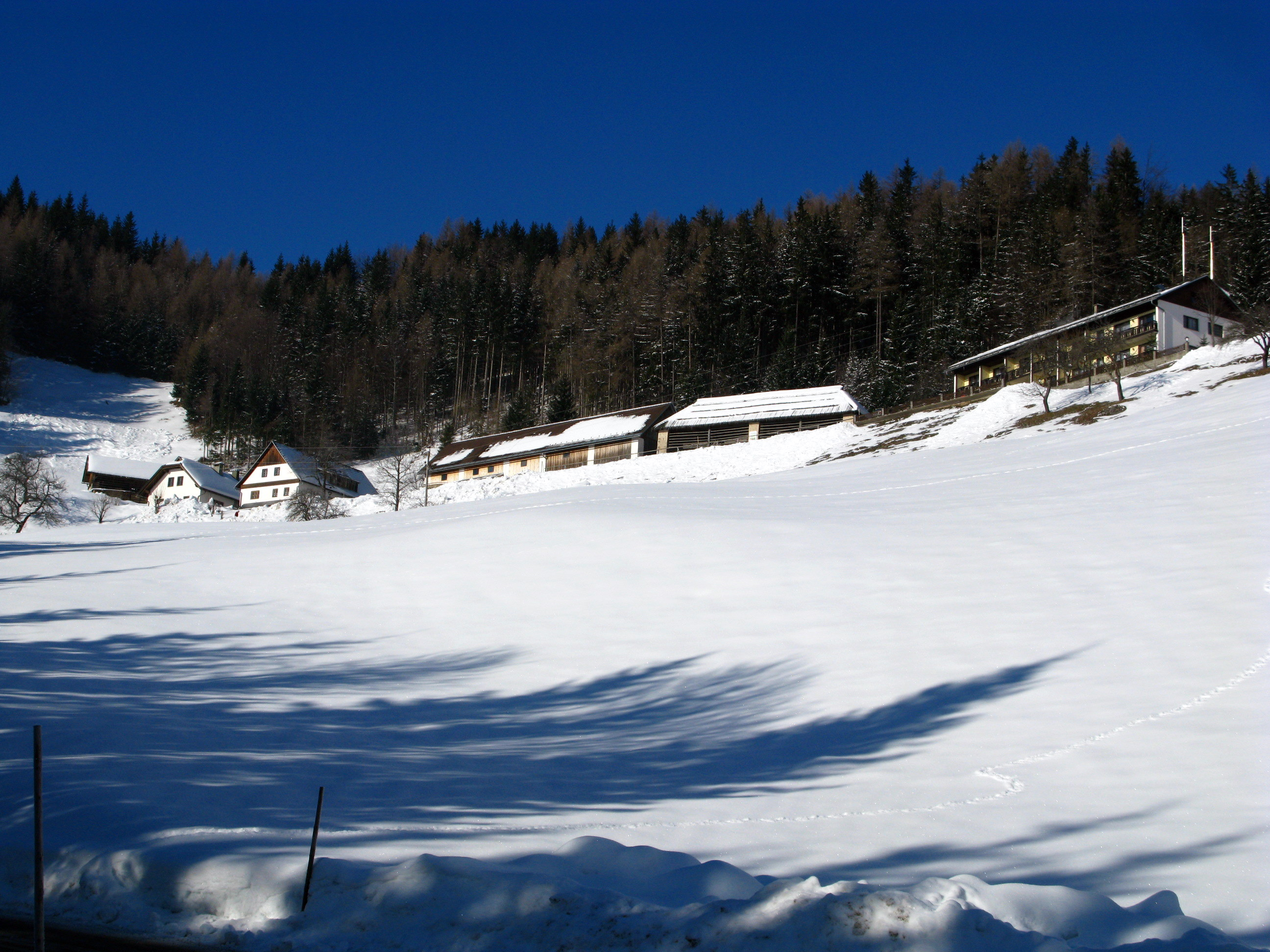
Lausegger in winter

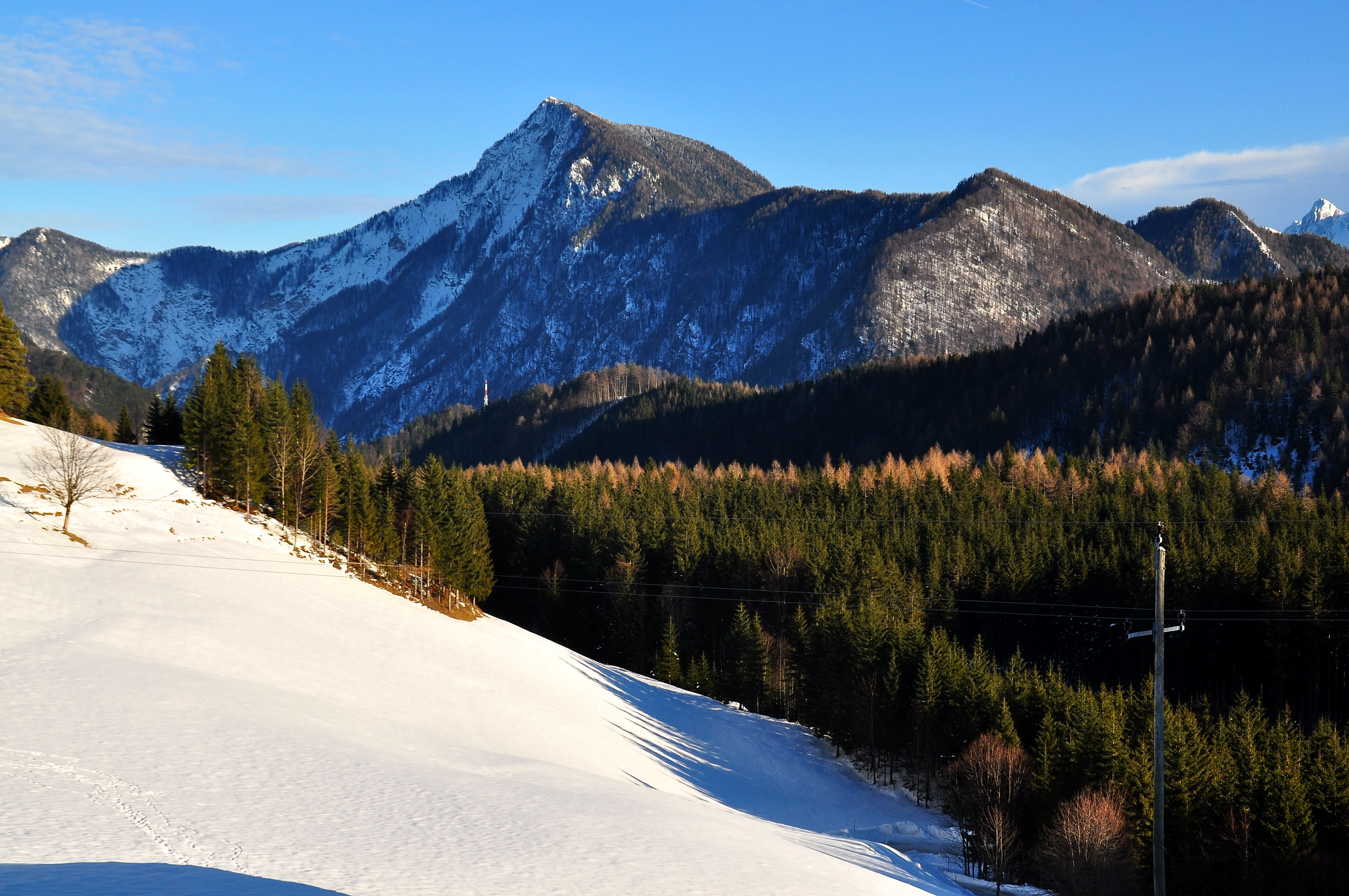
Lausegger - view east to the Ferlacher Horn

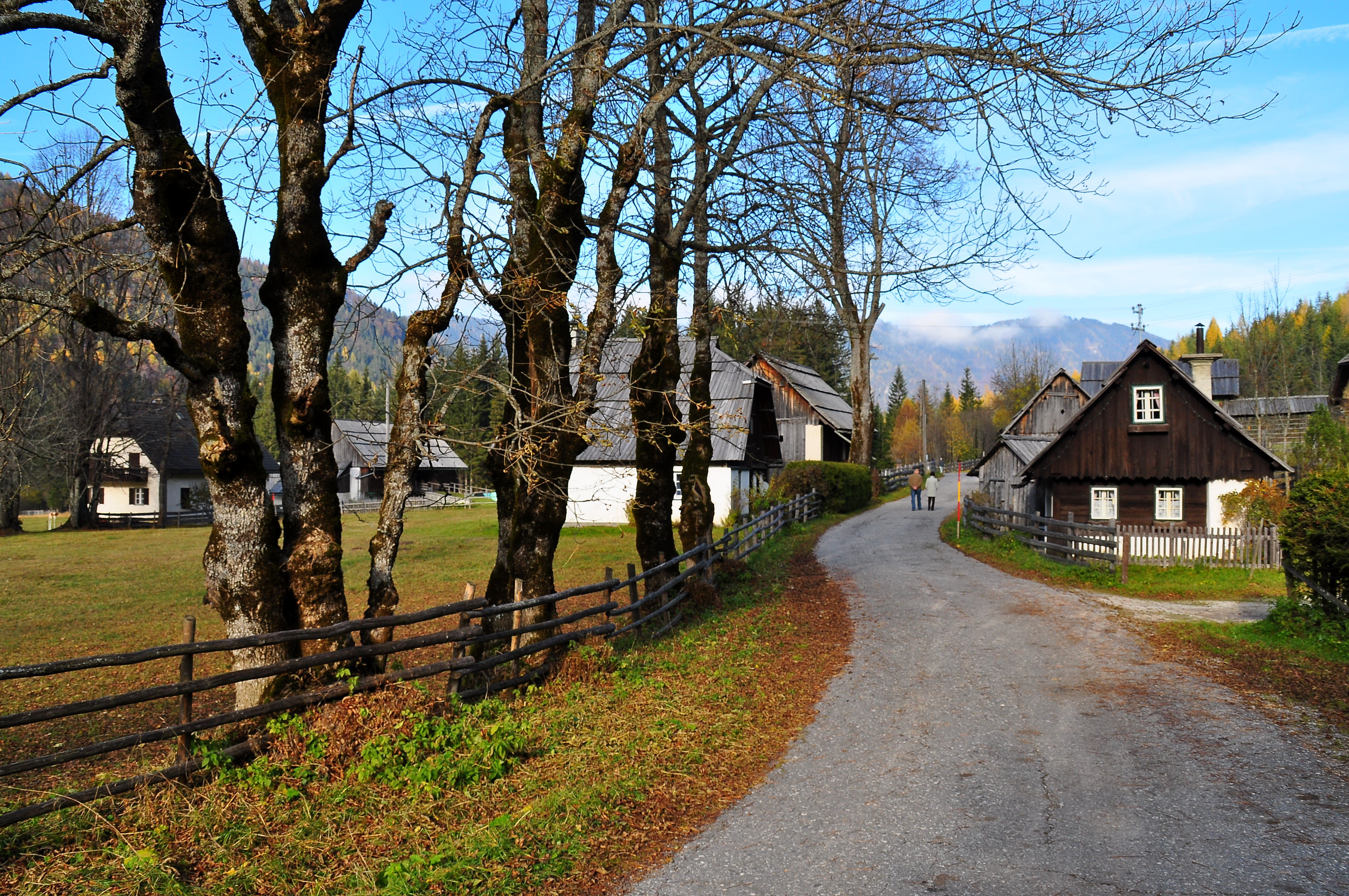
Autumnal landscape on the road leading to Bodenbauer

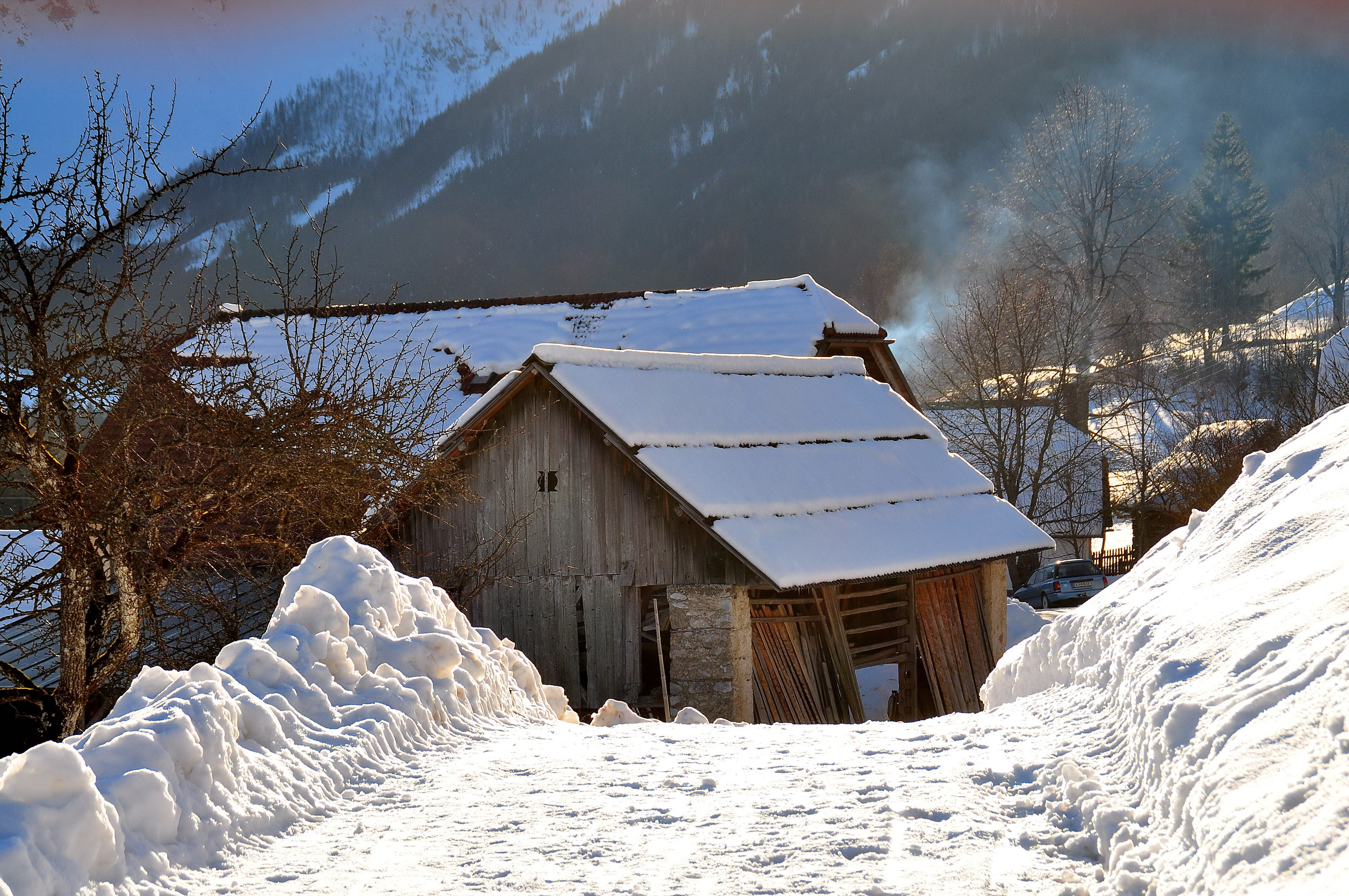
Hayrack in Bodental

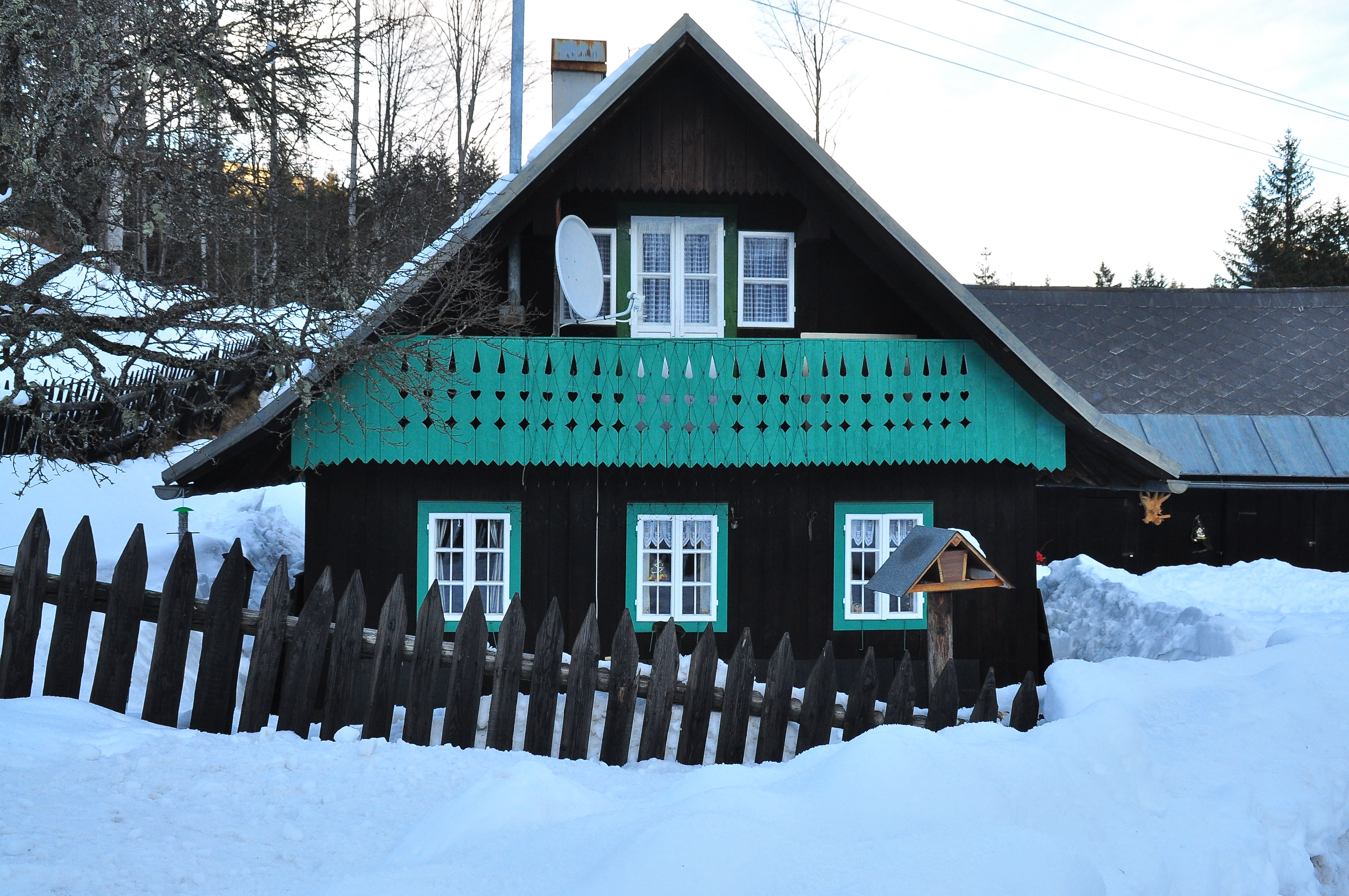
Traditional mountain hut in Bodental

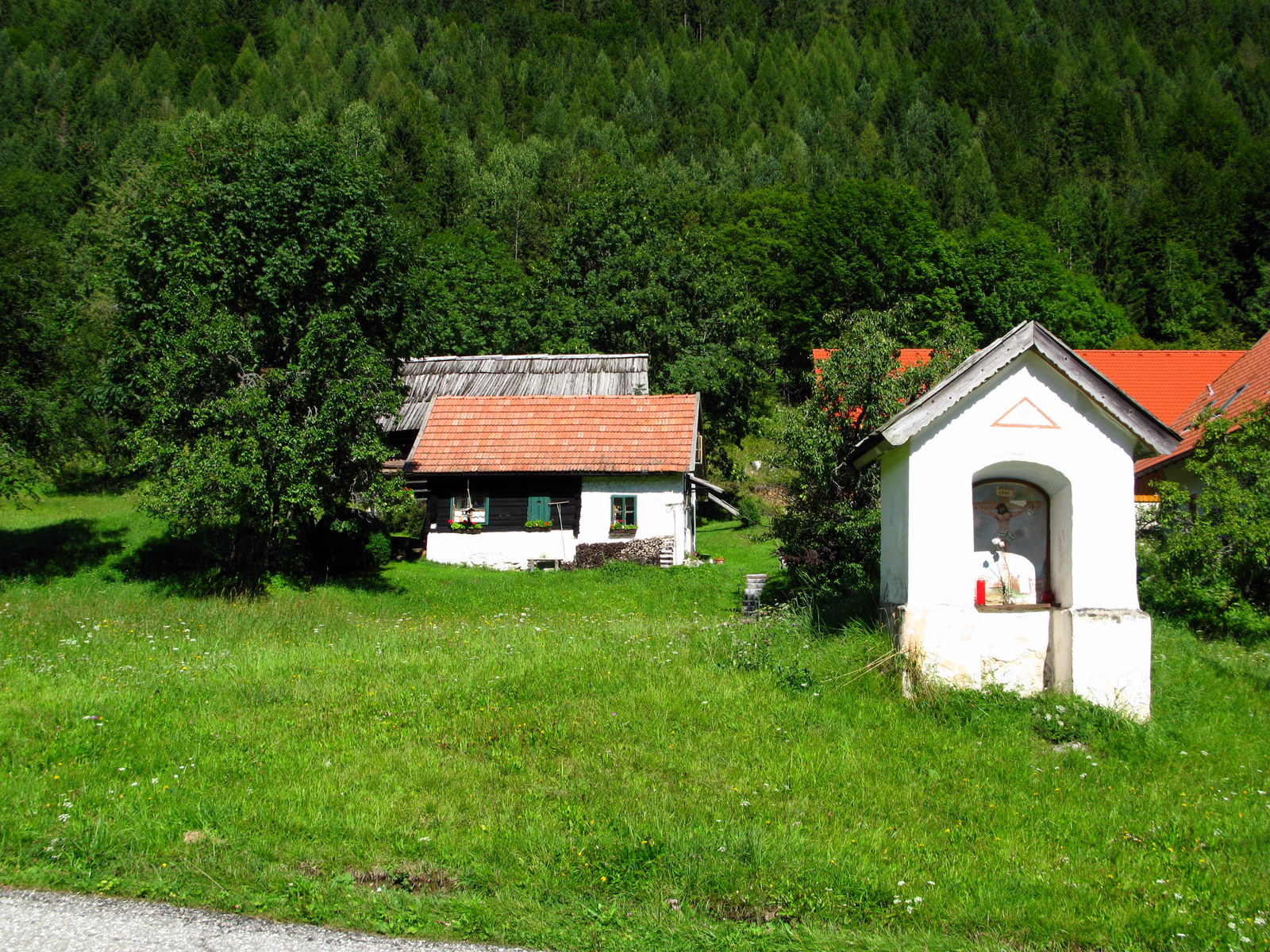
Old farmbuilding in Bodental

The Bodental (Slovene: Boden, Carinthian Slovene: Póden) is a remote mountain valley in the Karawanks in the south of Carinthia, Austria. Located at just over 1,000 metres above sea level, the valley extends southwesterly and can be reached by road or walking trail from the Loibl Pass road. The area is part of the cadastral community of Windisch Bleiberg, and since the beginning of 1973 it has been part of the municipality of Ferlach. The valley is drained via Boden Creek (German: Bodenbach, Slovene: Žabnica), which flows over Tschauko Falls in the Tscheppa Gorge.

Having one of the most beautiful valley closures of the Limestone Alps, the formerly agricultural 4 km-long mountain valley has developed into a popular leisure area. In summer there is hiking – for example, in the nature reserve or to the Klagenfurt Lodge (German: Klagenfurter Hütte). In winter, the valley is one of the few winter sport regions of the Karawanks with ski slopes, cross-country skiing, winter hiking, and sleigh riding.
