= Hrušica Peak =

Hrišica Peak (Hruški vrh, Rosenkogel)
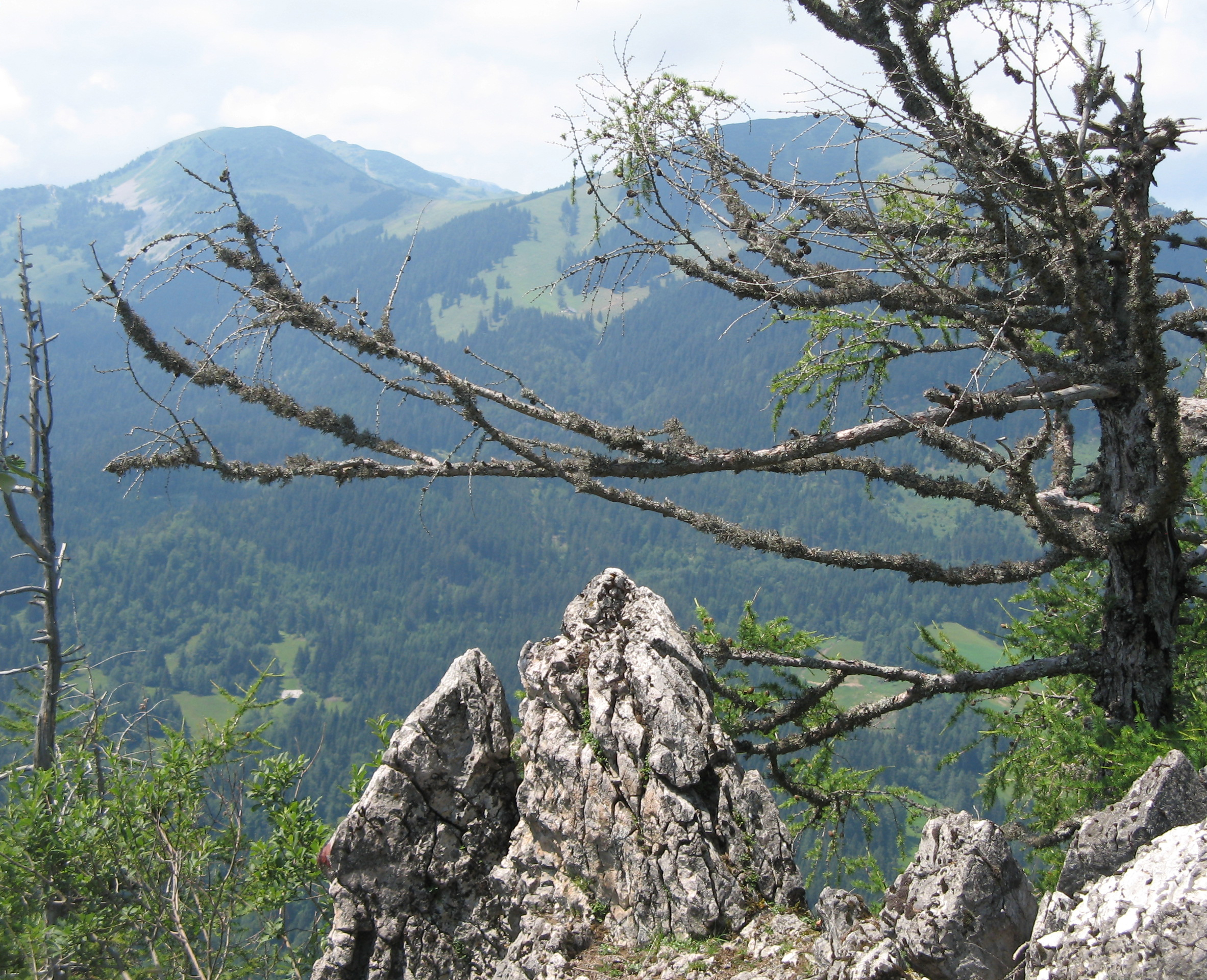
- View towards Rožca and other mountain tops

Highest point
- Elevation: 1,776 m (5,827 ft)
- Coordinates: 46°28′51″N 14°0′10″E

Geography
- Location: Slovenia
- Parent range: Karawanks

Hrušica Peak (Slovene: Hruški vrh, in older sources also Rožčica; German: Rosenkogel; 1,776 m or 5,827 ft) is a peak in the Western Karawanks between Dovška Baba and Mount Klek.
