= Monte Forno =

Monte Forno may refer to the following mountains of the Alps in Italy:

- Monte del Forno (3,214 m), a mountain in the Bregaglia Range
- Monte Forno (Leone-Gotthand Alps) (2,590 m), a mountain in the Leone-Gotthard range
- Monte Forno (Vicentine Alps) (1,911 m), a mountain in the Vicentine range
- Monte Forno (Karawanks) (1,508 m), which forms the tripoint between Austria, Italy and Slovenia
