= Wertatscha =

Mountain in Austria and Slovenia

Wertatscha / Vrtača
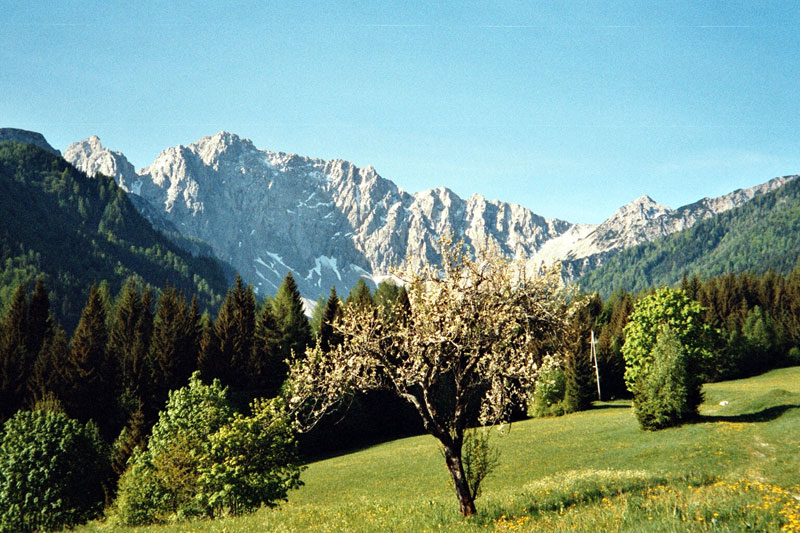
- Wertatscha from the north from the Bodental

Highest point
- Elevation: 2,180 m (AA) (7,150 ft) (2,181 m)
- Prominence: 2,180-1,840 m ↓ Bielschitza Saddle
- Isolation: 2.8 km → Hochstuhl
- Coordinates: 46°26′23″N 14°12′45″E

Geography
- Location within Alps
- Location: Carinthia, Austria and Slovenia
- Parent range: Karawanks

Geology
- Rock type: Dachstein limestone

Wertatscha (also Vertatscha) or Vrtača is a mountain, 2,180 m above sea level (AA), in the Karawanks on the border between Austria and Slovenia. In the old German Alpine dialect it was also called the Deutscher Berg ("German Mountain", Slovenian Nemška gora) or Zinnenwand. Other names are Meniška gora (Mönchsberg) and Rtača.

== Location and surrounding area ==
Wertatscha stands on the main chain of the Karawanks, which marks the border here between Austria (municipality of Ferlach) and Slovenia (municipality of Žirovnica). To the north the mountain drops in steep, up to 600-metre-high, rock faces into the valley of Bodental above Windisch Bleiberg; the southern side is gentler. To the west the massif of Wertatscha is bounded by the Bleischitz Saddle (1,840 m); below which is the Klagenfurter Hut an important base for an ascent of the mountain. To the northeast the chain continues over the col of Pautzscharte (1,950 m) to the Pautz/Zelenjak (2,024 m) and the 2,025 m-high Selenitza/Palec. To the east Wertatscha drops down a rock face to the cirque of Suho ruševje. To the southeast lies the mountain hut of Dom na Zelenici, another important starting point, at 1,536 m-high on the Selenitza Saddle.

== Routes to the summit ==
From the Bielschitza Saddle a discernible path leads to the top in about two hours passing across the schrofen covered southwest slopes. The rather longer climb from the Selenitza Saddle over the southern mountainside is partially waymarked. A ravine from the northwest from the Suho-ruševje cirque, climbing grade II, the southeast arête (also II) and the crumbly western arête from the Bielschitza Saddle (III) are much more difficult.

The north face of Wertatscha has special significance for alpinism. In 1902 Eduard Pichl succeeded in making the first ascent of this face which has a climbing grade of IV. Today there are many other climbing routes, many at grades IV and V. Historically important was the first ascent of the northwest pinnacle by Kurt Maix in 1925. This was the first time that a grade V climb was achieved in the Karawanks. The east face offer several shorter climbing routes, which were opened in the late 20th century.

== Incidents ==
On 21 September 2016 there were rockfalls in the Wertatscha Cirque. The dust cloud reached as far as the Klagenfurter Hut and hiking trails were closed as a precaution.

== Literature ==
- Hans M. Tuschar (1990), Österreichischer Alpenverein (ed.), Alpine Club Guide Karawanken (in German), München: Bergverlag Rother, pp. 227–237, ISBN 9783763312627 – via Google Books
