= Loibl Pass =

Mountain pass between Austria and Slovenia

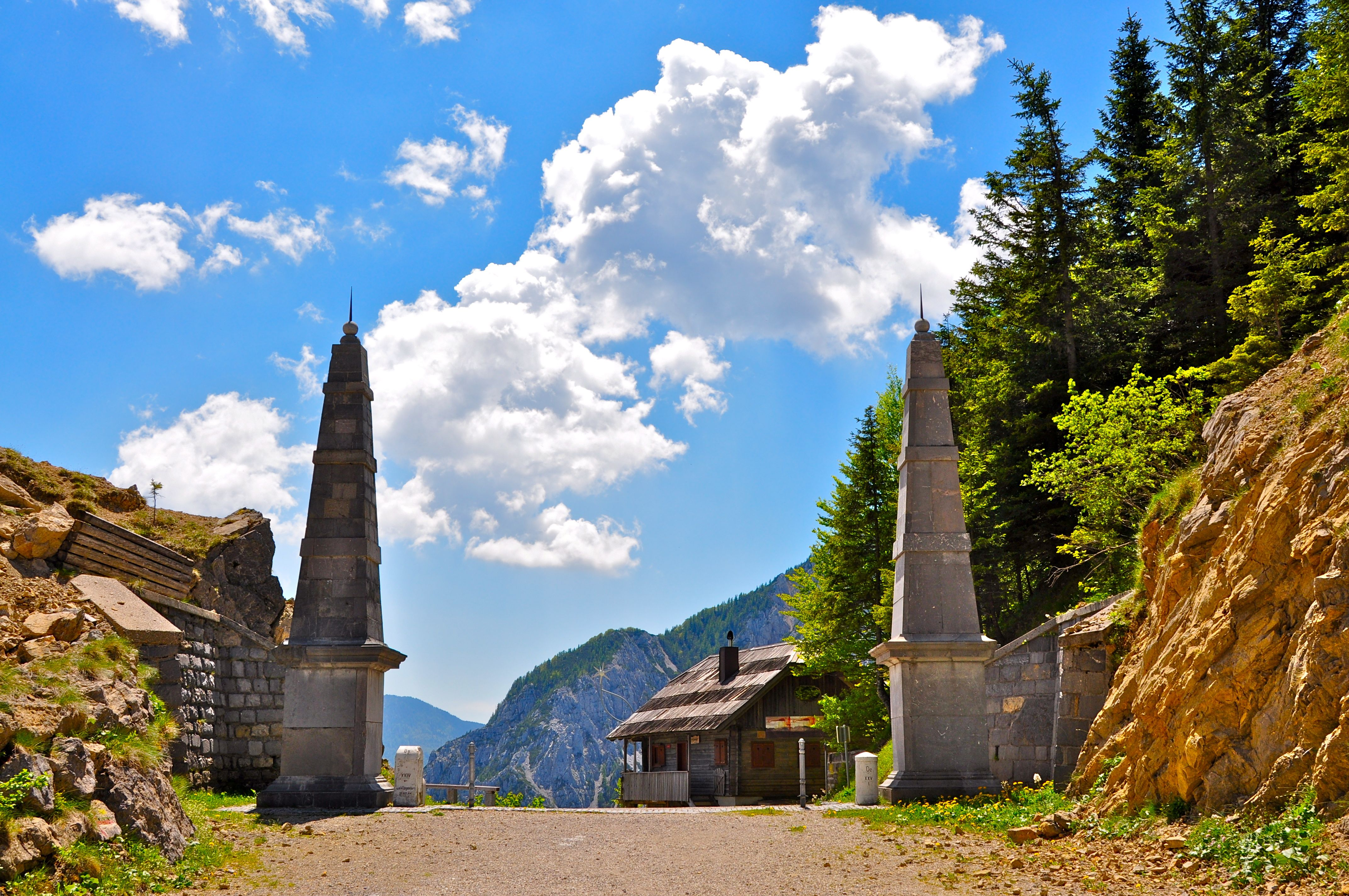
- Top of historic Loibl Pass with obelisks

- Location within Alps
- Elevation: 1,367 m (4,485 ft)
- Traversed by: road

Location
- Location: Austrian–Slovenian border
- Range: Karawanks
- Coordinates: 46°26′30″N 14°15′19″E

The Loibl Pass (German: Loiblpass) or Ljubelj Pass (Slovene: prelaz Ljubelj) is a high mountain pass in the Karawanks chain of the Southern Limestone Alps, linking Austria with Slovenia. The Loibl Pass road is the shortest connection between the Carinthian town of Ferlach and Tržič in Upper Carniola and part of the European route E652 from Klagenfurt to Naklo.

== Geography ==
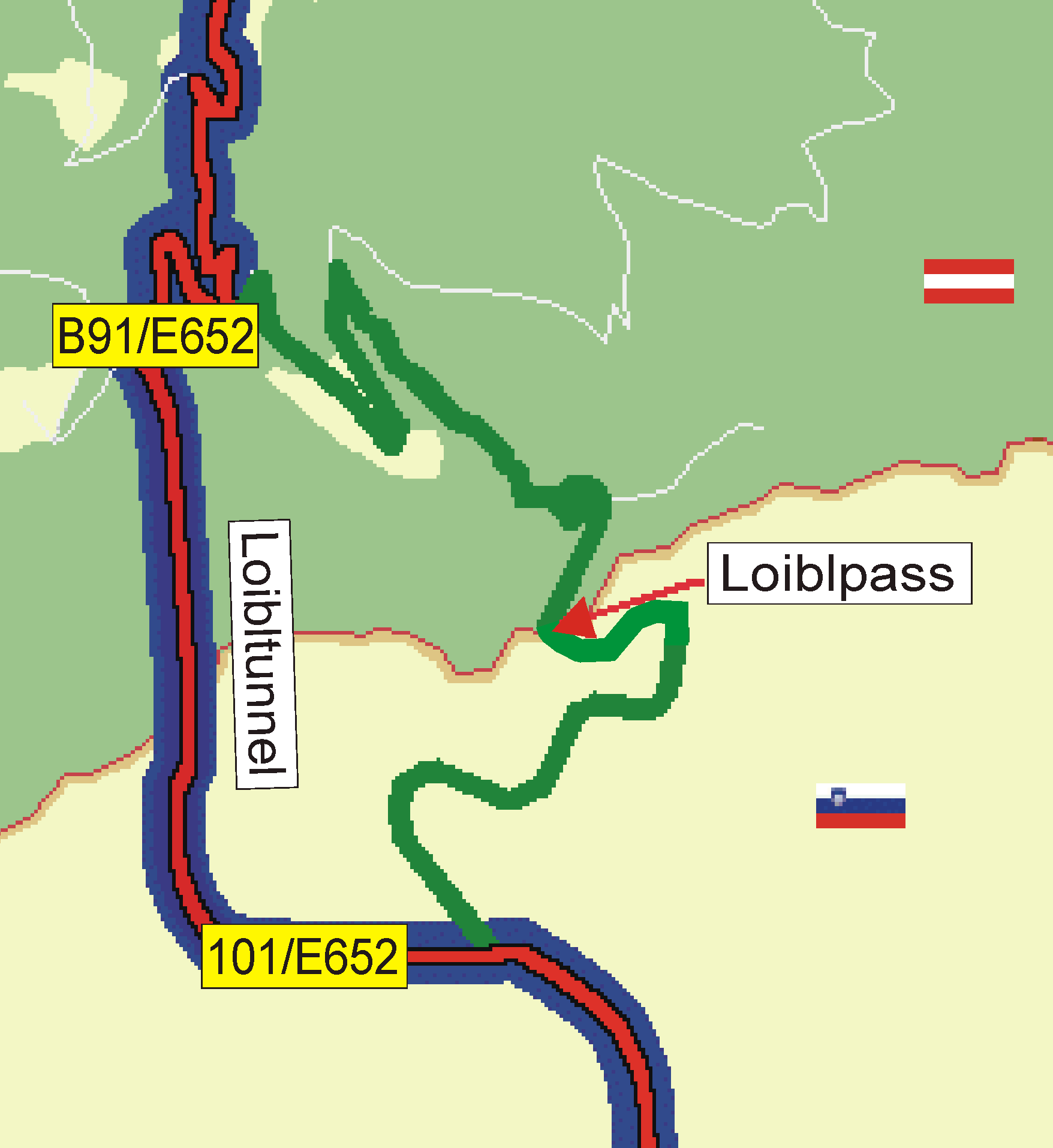
Loibl Tunnel and historic pass road

The mountain pass is located just on the Austrian-Slovenian border at 1,367 metres above the Adriatic (4,485 ft), east of the Stol massif. The mountain road (Loiblpass Straße, B 91), one of the steepest in the Eastern Alps, winds up from the broad Drava valley in numerous hairpin curves to the top of the pass, parallel to the Loiblbach brook and the picturesque Tscheppa (Čepa) gorge with several waterfalls. From the Kleiner Loibl (Sapotnica) pass, a small road branches off to the remote Bodental valley. Since 1963-64 the traffic passes through a two-lane tunnel at 1,069 m (3,507 ft) underneath the mountain crest. South of the pass, the road (No. 101) runs down via Podljubelj to Tržič in the Sava valley and further to the A2 motorway. Nearby mountain passes are Wurzen Pass in the west and Seeberg Saddle in the east.

Formerly one of the most important road connections between the Carinthian capital Klagenfurt and Kranj in Carniola, the significance of Loibl Pass has diminished since 1991, when the 7,864 m (25,801 ft) long Karawanken Motorway Tunnel, connecting the Austrian Karawanken Autobahn (A 11) from Villach with the Slovenian A2 motorway to Ljubljana, was opened. Today the pass road is closed for heavy traffic. Border controls were abolished when Slovenia joined the Schengen Area effective from 21 December 2007, but have been restored temporarily for entry to Austria in the wake of an increased number of illegal border crossings during the "European migrant crisis" of 2015–2016.

== History ==
Different trails were used since ancient times, connecting Virunum in the Roman province of Noricum with Emona (at present-day Ljubljana). In medieval times, the strategic importance of Loibl Pass increased again, when in the 11th century Emperor Henry III separated the southeastern March of Carniola from the Carinthia. The Patriarchs of Aquileia, governing the margraviate from 1077, entrusted the maintenance of the pass road to the Cistercian monks of newly established Viktring Abbey, who had a hospitium and a chapel dedicated to Saint Leonard erected. Nevertheless, the monks had to rival with claims raised by the local Lords of Hollenburg (Humberk) Castle, who took over the possessions by 1488. Since 1335, both the Carinthian and Carniolan Imperial estates in the north and south were ruled by the Habsburg dukes of Austria.

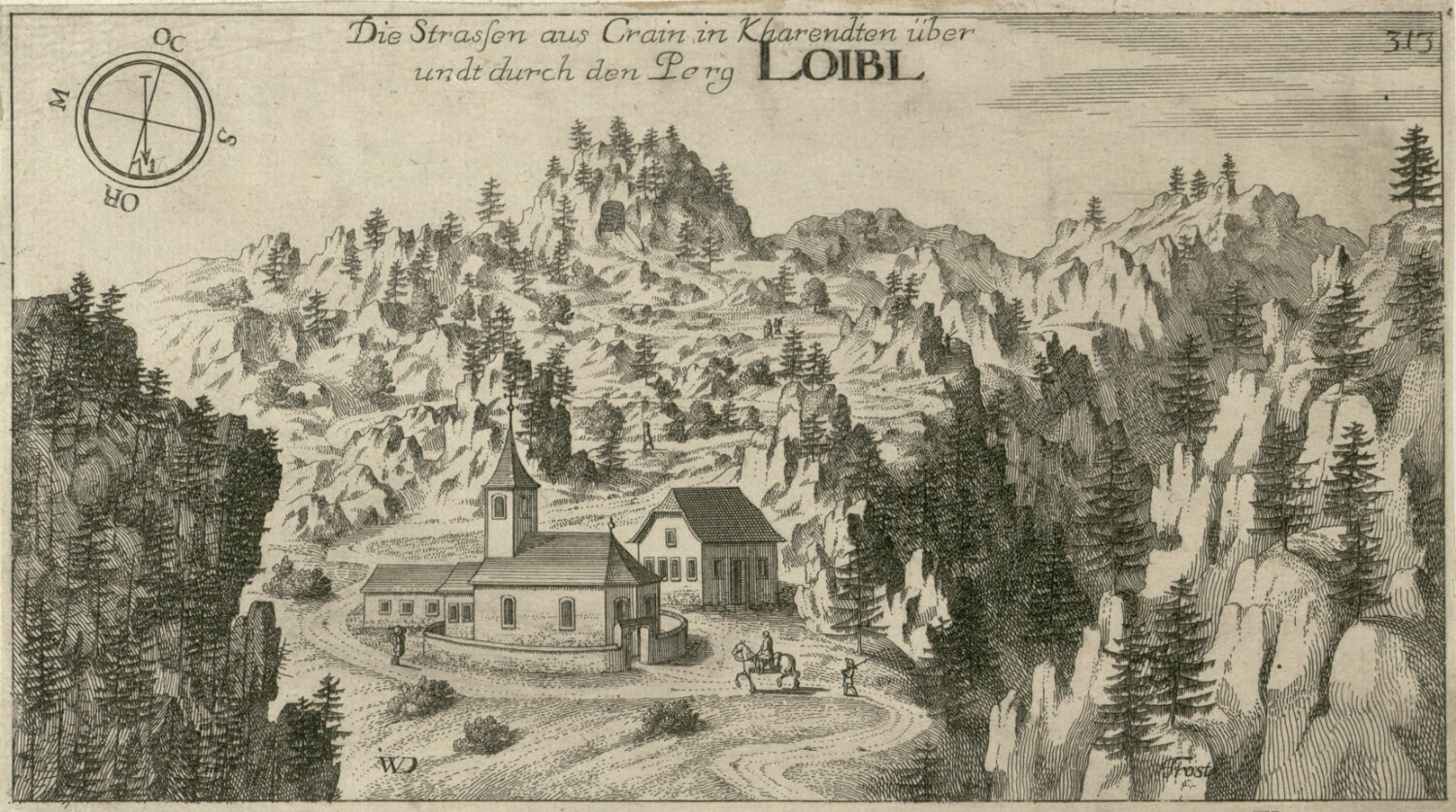
Road and tunnel "over and through Loibl Berg", engraving by Johann Weikhard von Valvasor, 1679

The pass became an important trade route after the City of Trieste went under the umbrella of the Habsburg archdukes in the late 14th century. From about 1560 the Carinthian estates had the former bridle path extended and a 150 m (500 ft) long tunnel built underneath the Karawanks ridge, an early example of modern engineering that later had to be removed due to lack of safety. Another attempt was planned in the 17th century; however, when in 1728 Emperor Charles VI toured the lands of the Habsburg monarchy, he still had to travel over the Loibl summit, stopping by the Deutscher Peter tavern north of the pass. Thereafter he ordered the expansion of the mountain road as part of the long-distance route from the Austrian capital Vienna to the Port of Trieste. Two obelisks were erected at the top of the pass to commemorate his stay.

== Loibl Tunnel ==
During World War II, a 1,570 m (5,150 ft) long tunnel was built at 1,068 m (3,504 ft) above sea level by command of the Nazi Gauleiter of Carinthia, Friedrich Rainer, to bypass the steep upper parts of the mountain road. Work was performed by the Viennese Universale Hoch- und Tiefbau construction company, employing 660 civilian workers, several posted by the Service du travail obligatoire of Vichy France, and 1,652 forced labourers supplied by contract with the SS. These prisoners were interned in two minor subcamps of the Mauthausen-Gusen concentration camp, one on each side of the pass. They were put under the command of Obersturmführer Julius Ludolf, who served in Mauthausen since 1940 and was notorious for his excessive beatings.

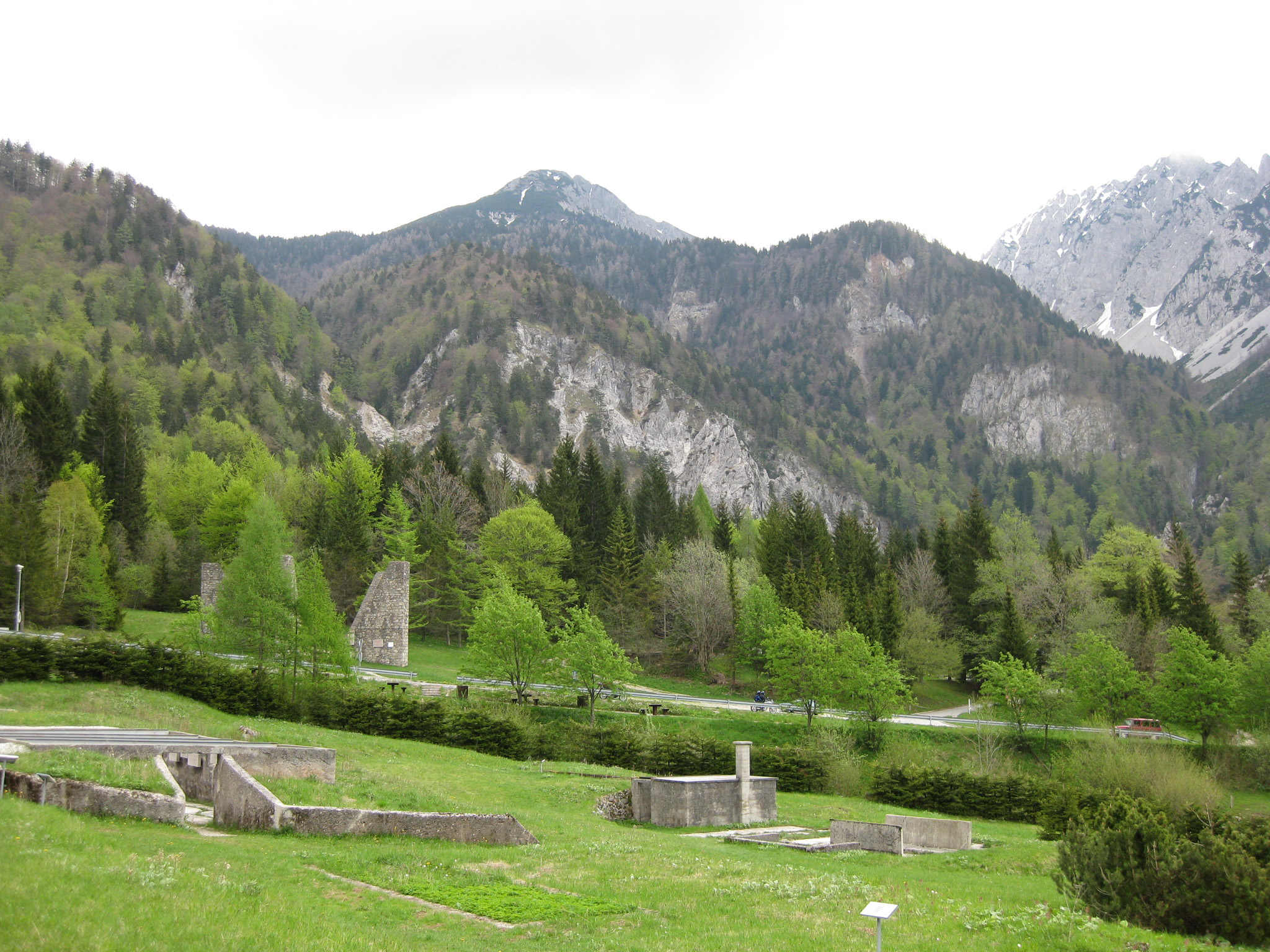
Loibl subcamp memorial

Tunnel construction started on the south side in March 1943. The first forced labourers arrived at Tržič in June and were immediately transported to Loibl Pass by SS personnel. Most of the inmates were POWs and political prisoners. They were interned with German and Austrian criminals who assumed Kapo functions. Under inhumane conditions, about 40 forced labourers died either from starvation and exhaustion, or were killed by mistreatment, work-related accidents and rockfalls. By August, Ludolf was removed from his post after the construction company complained about the number of inmates that became incapable of working due to beatings and torture. To keep the work force efficient, hundreds of injured or sick prisoners were sent back to the main camp, or if unable to be transported were murdered on-site by camp physician Sigbert Ramsauer by petrol injection.

The breakthrough of the tunnel happened in December 1943. Rainer and several high-ranking SS members came to inspect the project. The first Wehrmacht army vehicles passed through the very tight tunnel on 4 December 1944. Military traffic, German soldiers retreating from the Yugoslav Front and refugees used the tunnel until it was closed in 1947. At the end of the war, on 7 May 1945, the surviving 950 prisoners from the two camps were largely abandoned by the guards and began marching down to Feistritz im Rosental, where they met Yugoslav Partisans on the following day. As the survivors had in effect 'freed themselves', theirs were the only subcamps of Mauthausen-Gusen not to be either evacuated or liberated.

An American military court sentenced commandant Julius Ludolf to death on 13 May 1946. He was executed on 28 May 1947. British military courts sentenced two other SS commanders of the camps, Jakob Winkler and Walter Briezke, to death on 10 November 1947, and sentenced camp physician Sigbert Ramsauer to life imprisonment on 10 October 1947. Ramsauer was released in 1954, however, and soon obtained an employment at the Klagenfurt state hospital. Today plaques at the Austrian tunnel portal and a memorial on the Slovenian side, erected at the site of the southern Loibl camp, commemorate the injustices. A joint memorial service was held on 13 June 2015.

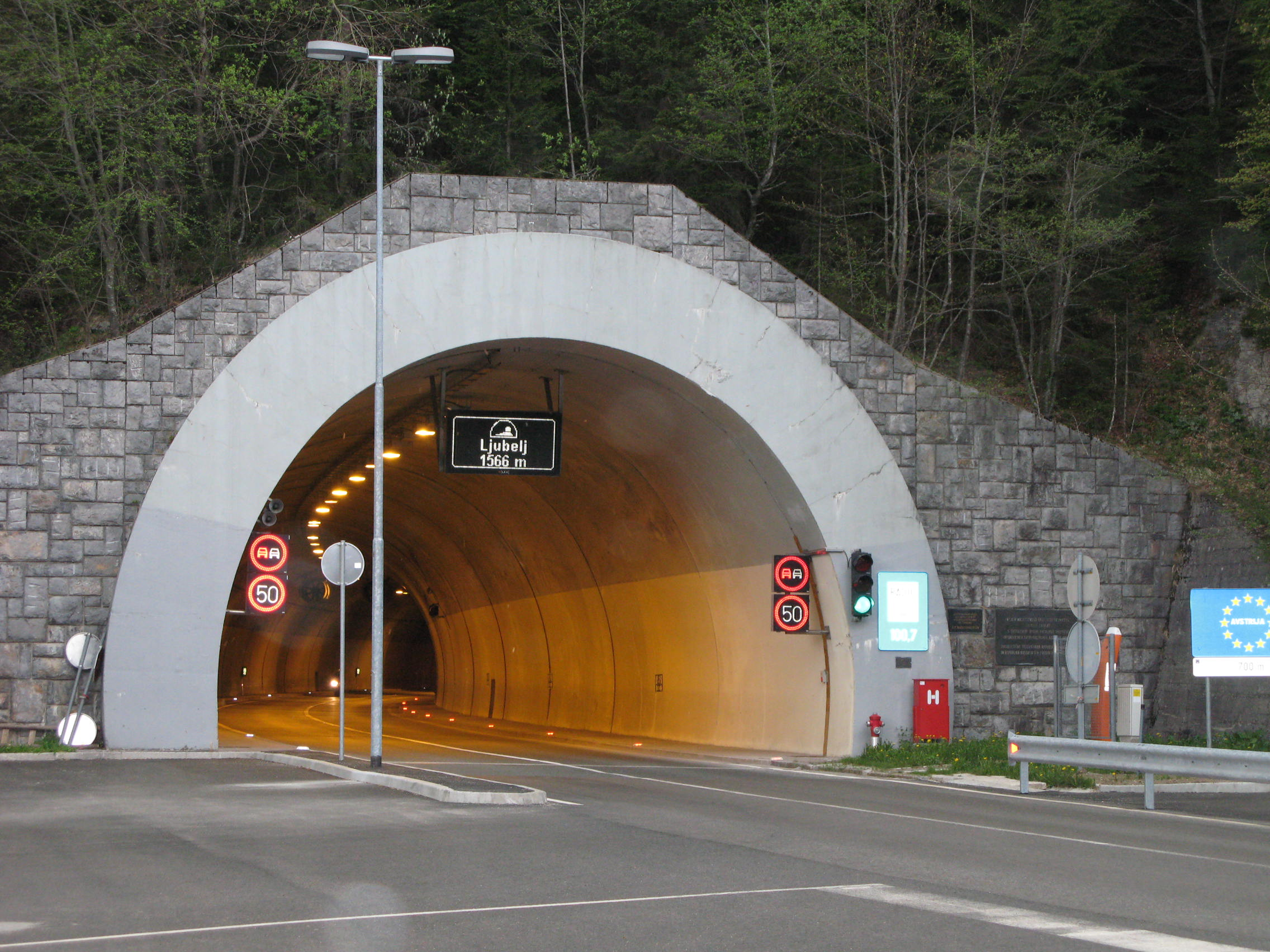
Slovenian side of the present Loibl Tunnel

Memorial plaques on the Slovenian side to internees that built the tunnel

The tunnel reopened as a border crossing between Austria and the Federal People's Republic of Yugoslavia in 1950 and expanded in the early 1960s to two lanes in November 1963. The old road over the summit of the mountain pass has been closed to motor traffic since 1967.

== Recreation ==
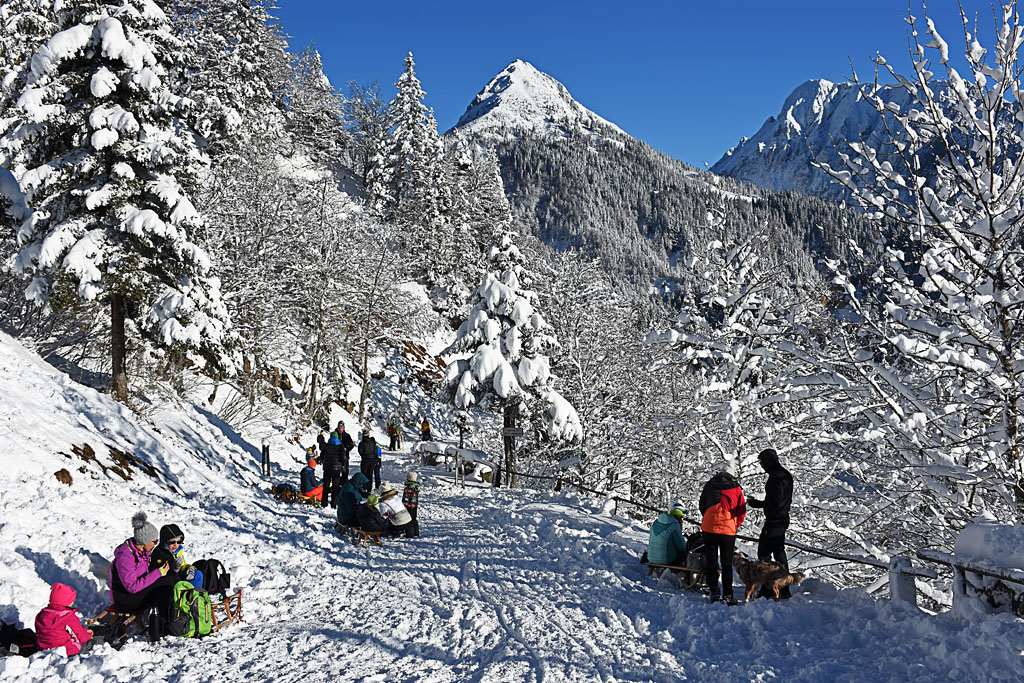
Sledge piste after December snow fall.

In summer, the old road pass provides access to hiking routes along the main ridge of Karawank Mountains. Almost every winter a sled run is set up on the southern (Slovenian) side of the pass.

== See also ==
- List of highest paved roads in Europe
- List of mountain passes
