= Visoki Kurji vrh =

Mountain in the country of Slovenia

Highest point
- Elevation: 1,828 m (5,997 ft)
- Coordinates: 46°29′47″N 13°53′6″E

Geography
- Location: Slovenia
- Parent range: Karawanken Alps

Visoki Kurji vrh (1822 m), also just Visoki vrh is a peak in the Western Karawanks in Slovenia.
