= Begunjščica =

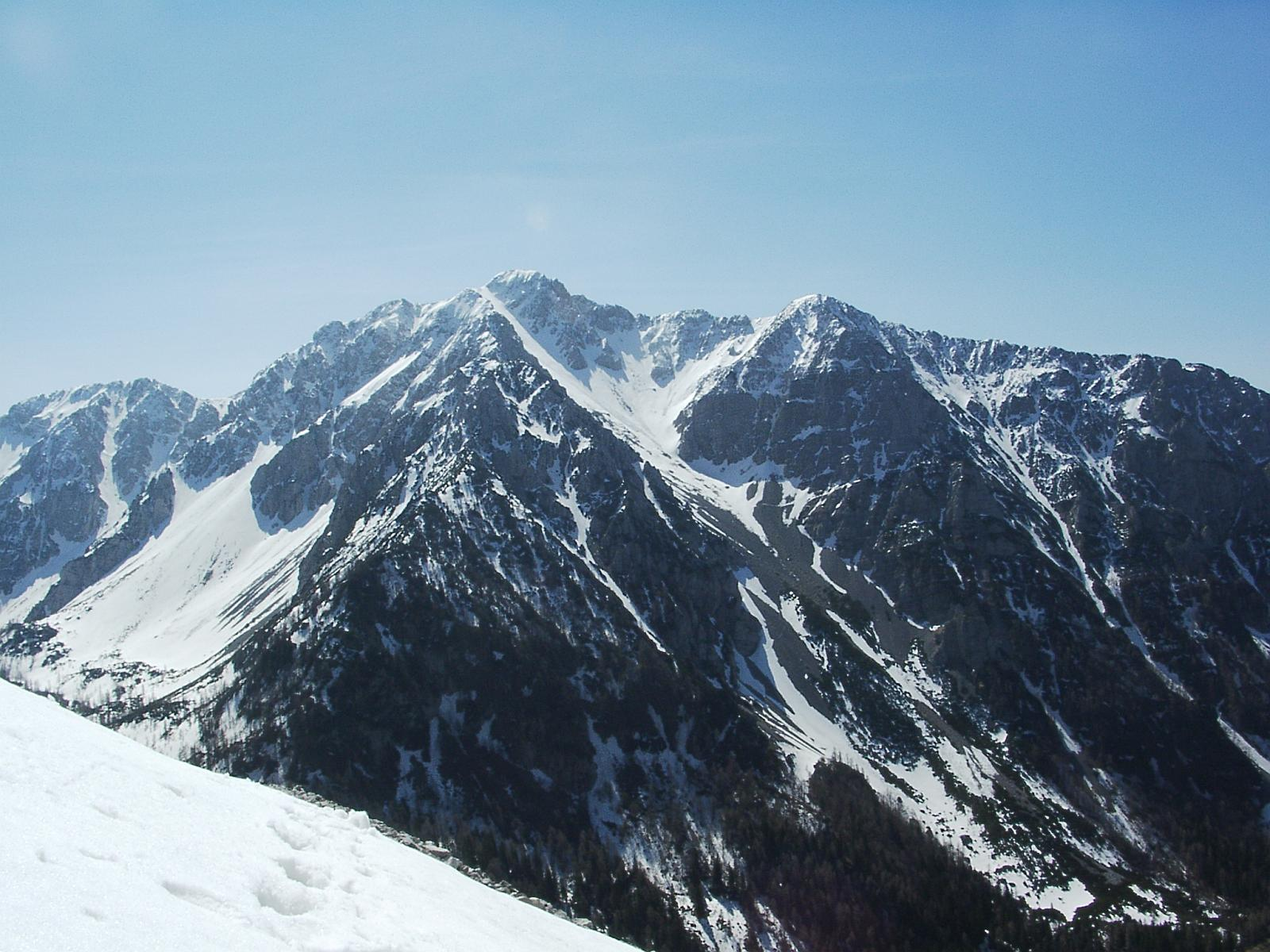
- Begunjščica

Highest point
- Elevation: 2,060 m (6,760 ft)
- Prominence: 518 m (1,699 ft)
- Coordinates: 46°25′17.076″N 14°13′45.5154″E

Geography
- Location within Alps
- Location: Slovenia
- Parent range: Karawanks

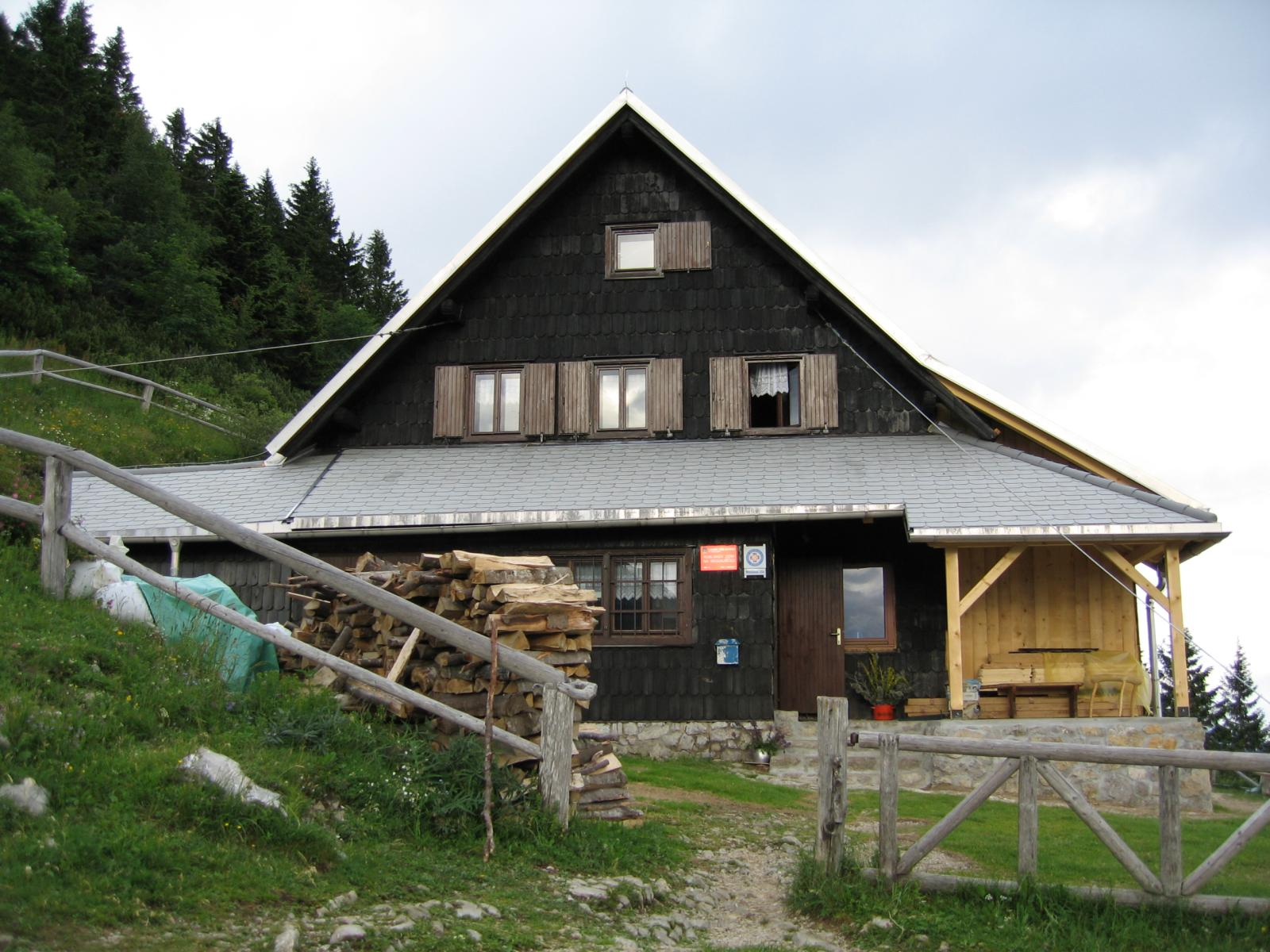
Roblek Lodge at Begunjščica

Begunjščica is a ridge mountain in the Karawanks. It rises from the western Smokuč mountain pasture (Slovene: Smokuška planina) to St. Anne (Sv. Ana) on its eastern side. The mountain has three main peaks, the highest being Big Peak (Veliki vrh, 2,060 metres or 6,760 feet). The western Middle Peak (Srednji vrh) lies a little lower, and the lowest is Begunje Mount Vrtača (Begunjska Vrtača, 1,997 m or 6,552 ft). Its southern slopes rise over the Draga Valley. The ascent of the mountain is relatively easy and possible throughout the year. In the winter and early spring conditions are favourable for ski touring.

== Starting points ==
- 4½ hrs from Begunje (616 m or 2,021 ft), over the Preval Pass and Begunje Mount Vrtača.
- 3½–4 hrs from Podljubelj, over the Preval Pass and Begunje Mount Vrtača.
- 2½ hrs from the Zelenica Lodge (Planinski dom na Zelenici; 1,536 m or 5,039 ft) and across the Slovene Mountain Hiking Trail.
- 1 hr from the Roblek Lodge at Begunjščica (Roblekov dom na Begunjščici; 1,657 m or 5,436 ft), across the Slovene Mountain Hiking Trail.

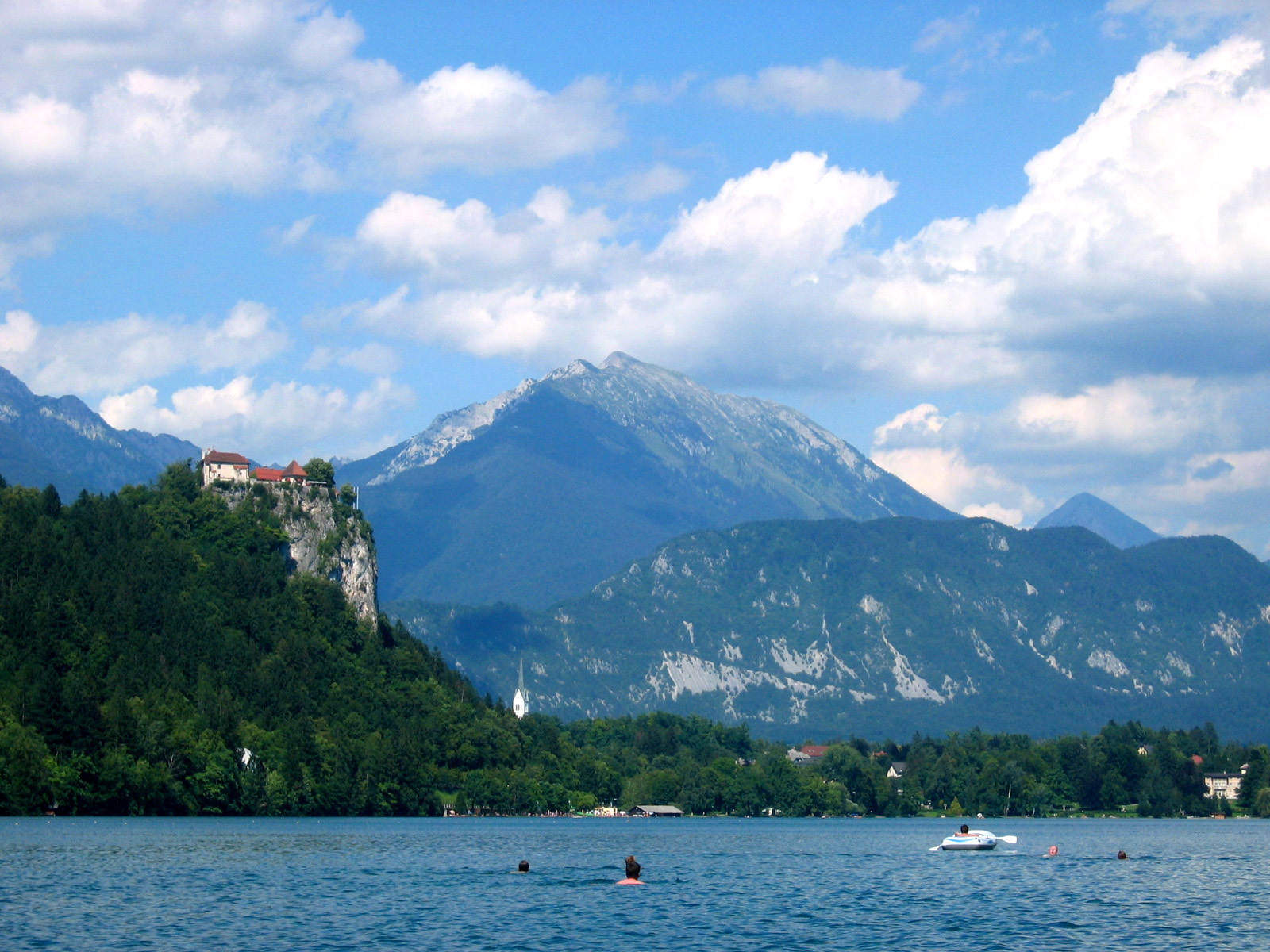
Begunjščica from Bled

== Panoramic view ==
There is a nice panoramic view from the summit. Towards the west there is Bohinj with its lake, Lake Bled, and Triglav. The Martuljek Group with Škrlatica, Stol, Vrtača and Košuta can be seen to the north. On the eastern side lie the Kamnik Savinja Alps with Storžič prominent, and the Ljubljana Basin can be seen to the south.

== Manganese ore ==
Begunjščica was once an important mining area for manganese ore in Slovenia. These mines contributed to 79% of all Slovene manganese ores processed in the ironworks of Jesenice. They were used in 1872 by the engineer Lambert von Pantz to make ferromanganese, a manganese and iron alloy, in a blast furnace, with significantly higher manganese content than was previously possible (37% instead of the previous 12%). This won the Carniolan Industrial Company 22 international recognitions, including a gold medal at the 1873 World Exposition in Vienna and an award at the Centennial Exposition in Pennsylvania in 1876. The manganese ore was dug at Begunjščica until 1915. Altogether 130,000 metric tons (130,000 long tons; 140,000 short tons) were dug, containing on average 30% manganese.
