= Klek (Karawanks) =

Highest point
- Elevation: 1,754 m (5,755 ft)
- Coordinates: 46°29′4″N 14°1′31″E

Geography
- Location: Slovenia, Austria
- Parent range: Karawanks

Klek (1,754 meters or 5,755 feet; German: Hahnkogel), also known as Petelin or Petelinjek to locals from the villages on the Slovene side below its summit, is a peak in the Western Karawanks, between Golica/Kahlkogel to the east and Dovška Baba (German: Frauenkogel) to the west. It lies on the border between Slovenia and Austria above the town of Jesenice. On the northern side towards Carinthia the peak itself is very steep and mostly composed of brittle rock and scree, and is accessible from Rosenbach on the Austrian side only via Rožca Saddle. Due to their inaccessibility, its northern slopes are known for their alpine flora, particularly the protected edelweiss. It is more easily accessible from the Slovene side from Planina pod Golico.

The Karawanks Tunnel crosses the border between Austria and Slovenia almost right underneath Klek.
