= Maloško Poldne =

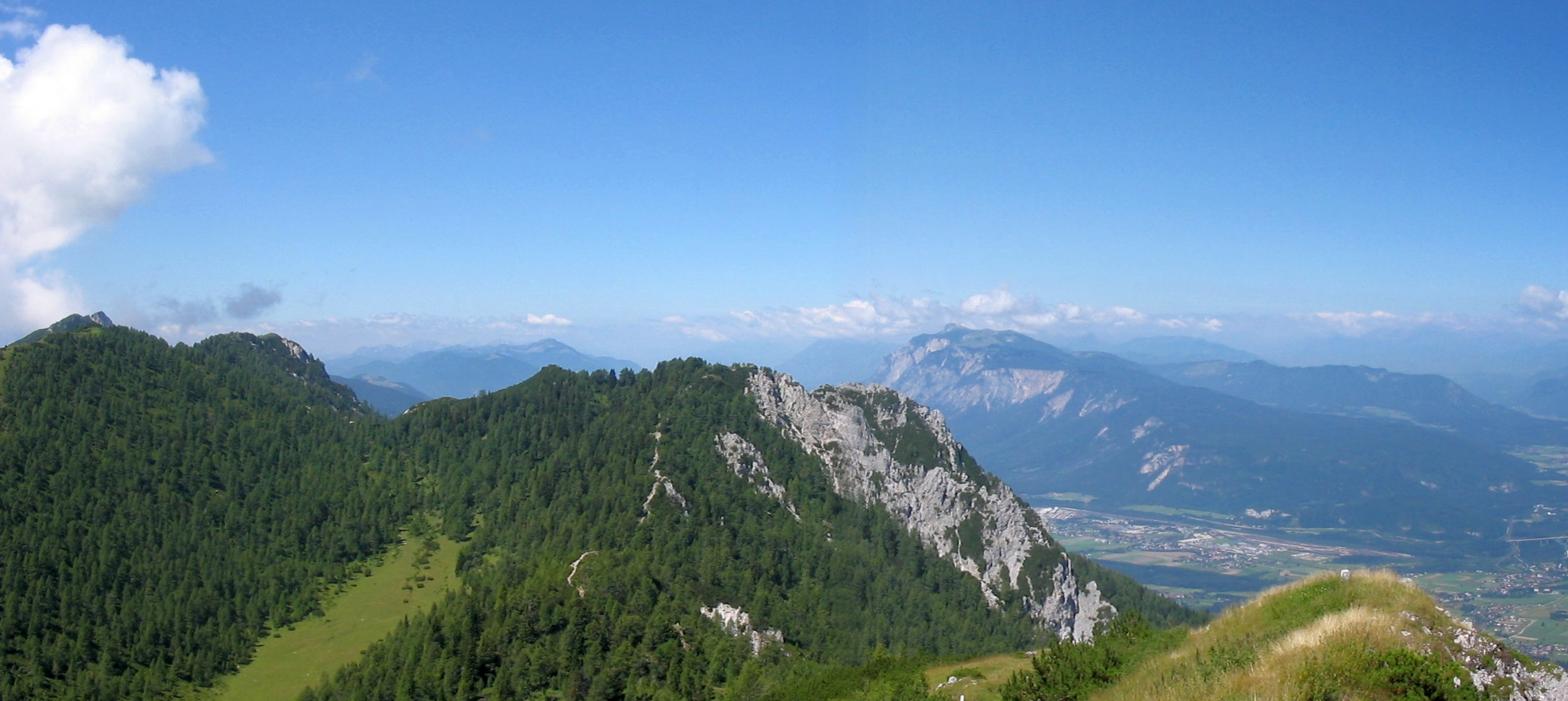

Highest point
- Elevation: 1,823 m (5,981 ft)
- Coordinates: 46°31′19″N 13°52′51″E

Geography
- Countries: Slovenia and Austria
- Parent range: Karawanks

Maloško Poldne (German: Mallestiger Mittagskogel) is a peak in the Western Karawanks, on the border between Slovenia and Austria.
