= European route E652 =

Road in trans-European E-road network

E652

Route information
- Length: 52 km (32 mi)

Major junctions
- From: Klagenfurt
- To: Naklo

Location
- Countries: Austria, Slovenia

Highway system
- International E-road network; A Class; B Class

European route E 652 is a European B class road in Austria and Slovenia, connecting the cities Klagenfurt – Naklo

== Itinerary ==
The E 652 routes through two European countries:

- Austria
  - B 91: Klagenfurt ( E66) - Loibltunnel
- Slovenia
  - G101: Predor Ljubelj - Naklo ( E61)
