= Stanko Klinar =

Slovenian translator and linguist (1933–2023)

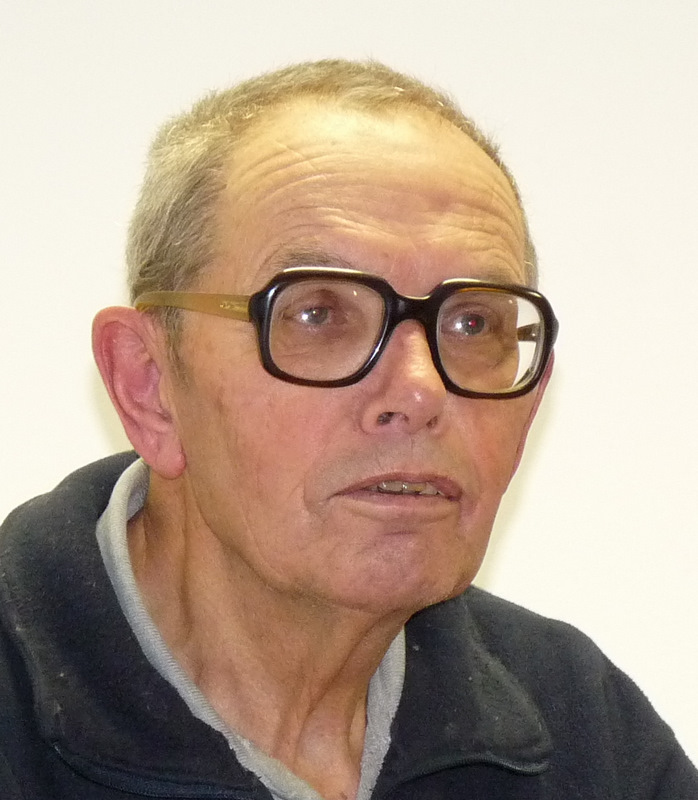
- Klinar in 2011
- Born: Stanislav Klinar; April 29, 1933 Hrušica, Kingdom of Yugoslavia
- Died: April 13, 2023 (aged 89) Ljubljana, Slovenia
- Occupation: English specialist; translator; mountain hiking author
- Language: Slovene; English

Stanislav "Stanko" Klinar (April 29, 1933 – April 13, 2023) was a Slovene English-language specialist, translator, and author of literature about mountain hiking.

== Life ==
Stanko Klinar was born in Hrušica in northwestern Slovenia. He graduated from high school in Jesenice and then studied English and German at the University of Ljubljana's Faculty of Arts, graduating in 1956.

Klinar performed his military service in 1957/58, and then from 1958 to 1960 he taught English and history at Prežihov Voranc Primary School in Jesenice. From 1960 to 1968 he was a teacher of English, German, and Slovene at Jesenice High School and at the same time at some other secondary schools in Upper Carniola and for continuing education courses in Jesenice. In 1968, he became a lecturer of modern English at the Department of English and American Studies at the University of Ljubljana's Faculty of Arts, and in 1985 he was appointed a senior lecturer in English. He lectured on translation and mountaineering and the connection between them (nomenclature, orthography, and terminology) in various courses and at various educational institutions, especially for the Slovenian Association of Scientific and Technical Translators (DZTPS) and for mountain guides, he participated in compiling the multilingual Planinski terminološki slovar (Mountain Terminology Dictionary, 2002), and he wrote forewords to volumes on mountain hiking by other authors—for example, Tone Škarja's Kangčendzenga – Gora usode (Kangchenjunga: Mountain of Destiny) and Jože Mihelič's Dober dan, Triglavski narodni park (Hello, Triglav National Park). In his youth, he himself was a mountaineer and mountain guide, as well as a competitive skier. He received his doctorate in 1996, and he became an assistant professor in 1997.

Klinar translated four volumes of fiction into Slovene, including by Arthur Conan Doyle and Zane Grey, and he translated the book Zakladi Slovenije (Treasures of Slovenia) into English.

Stanko Klinar had four children and six grandchildren, and he lived in Ljubljana and Mojstrana. He died in Ljubljana on April 13, 2023, at the age of 89.

== Bibliography ==
=== Linguistics ===
- Aspects of English Word Formation (Ljubljana: Filozofska fakulteta, 1974)
- A Guide to Irregular Verbs in Modern English (Ljubljana: Filozofska fakulteta, 1975)
- Slovenski toponimi v nemških besedilih (with Käthe Grah; Ljubljana: Univerza v Ljubljani, 1982)
- Gradivo za vaje iz prevajanja v angleščino (Ljubljana: Filozofska fakulteta, 1982)
- Slovenska zemljepisna imena v angleških besedilih (Ljubljana: Filozofska fakulteta, 1988)
- Prispevki k tehniki prevajanja iz slovenščine v angleščino (Radovljica: Didakta, 1996)

=== Mountaineering ===
- Karavanke: Planinski vodnik (Ljubljana: PZS, 1971)
- How to Climb Triglav: A Short Guide to Triglav (compiler and translator; Ljubljana: Planinska založba, 1979)
- Sto slovenskih vrhov (Ljubljana: Prešernova družba, 1991)
- Neznana Slovenija (with France Stele; Ljubljana: Cankarjeva založba, 1991)
- Aljažev zbornik (coauthor; Celje: Mohorjeva družba, 1993)
- Kdo je skrivnostni Slavin? Aljažev zbornik (Celje: Mohorjeva družba, 1993)
- Valentin Stanič: Prvi alpinist v Vzhodnih Alpah: Ob dvestoletnici njegovih vzponov na Veliki Klek in Watzmann leta 1800: Zbornik (editor; Ljubljana: Planinska zveza Slovenije, 2000)
- Slomškova pot: Priročnik za pešpotnike in romarje (Celje: Mohorjeva družba, 2002)
- "Leposlovna žetev zadnjega desetletja." Planinski zbornik 2003: 103–119)
- 55-krat Karavanke: Izletniški vodnik (2005)
- Dovje in Mojstrana: Vodnik za izletnike in planince (Celje: Mohorjeva družba, 2007); English translation: Walks and Climbs around Dovje and Mojstrana: A Tourist Guide (2008); German translation: Dovje und Mojstrana: Führer für Ausflügler und Bergsteiger (2009)
