= Dreiländereck =

Mountain in the Karawanks

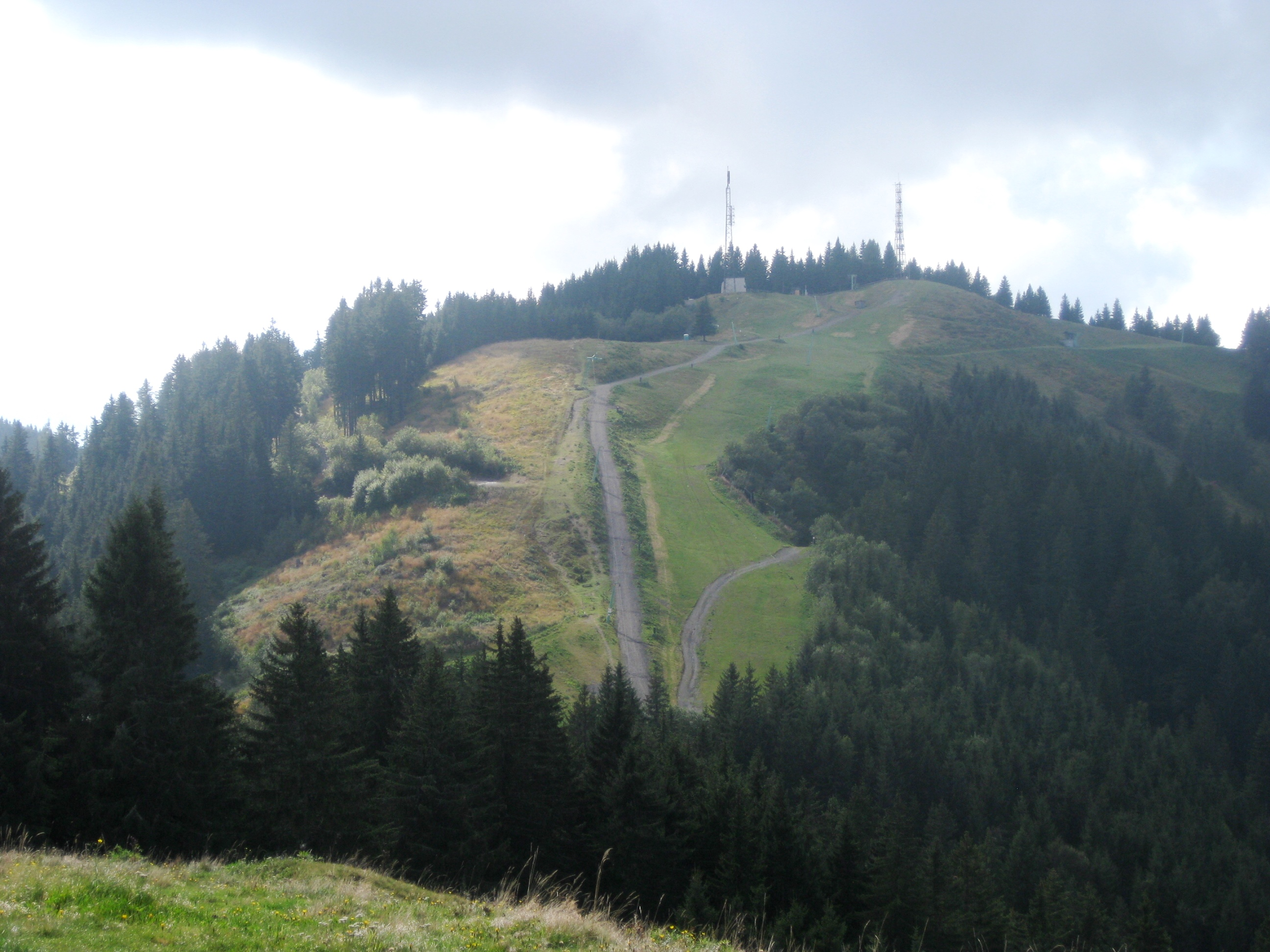
- Dreiländereck / Monte Forno / Peč

Highest point
- Elevation: 1,508 m (AA) (4,948 ft)
- Prominence: 100 m
- Isolation: 1.4 km → Hahnenwipfel
- Coordinates: 46°31′23″N 13°42′51″E

Geography
- Location within Austria
- Location: Austro-Italo-Slovenian border
- Parent range: Karawanks

Geology
- Rock type: Sandstone

Climbing
- Access: Skilifts

The Dreiländereck (also Ofen; Slovene: Peč; Italian: Monte Forno) is a mountain in the Karawanks whose summit is the tripoint of the countries of Austria, Italy, and Slovenia. It thus is also the meeting point of three languages: German, Italian, and Slovene. The height of the summit is 1,508 m (AA).

== Geography ==
The municipalities that meet at the tripoint are Arnoldstein in the Austrian state of Carinthia, Kranjska Gora in the Upper Carniola region of Slovenia, and Tarvisio in the Italian autonomous region of Friuli-Venezia Giulia.

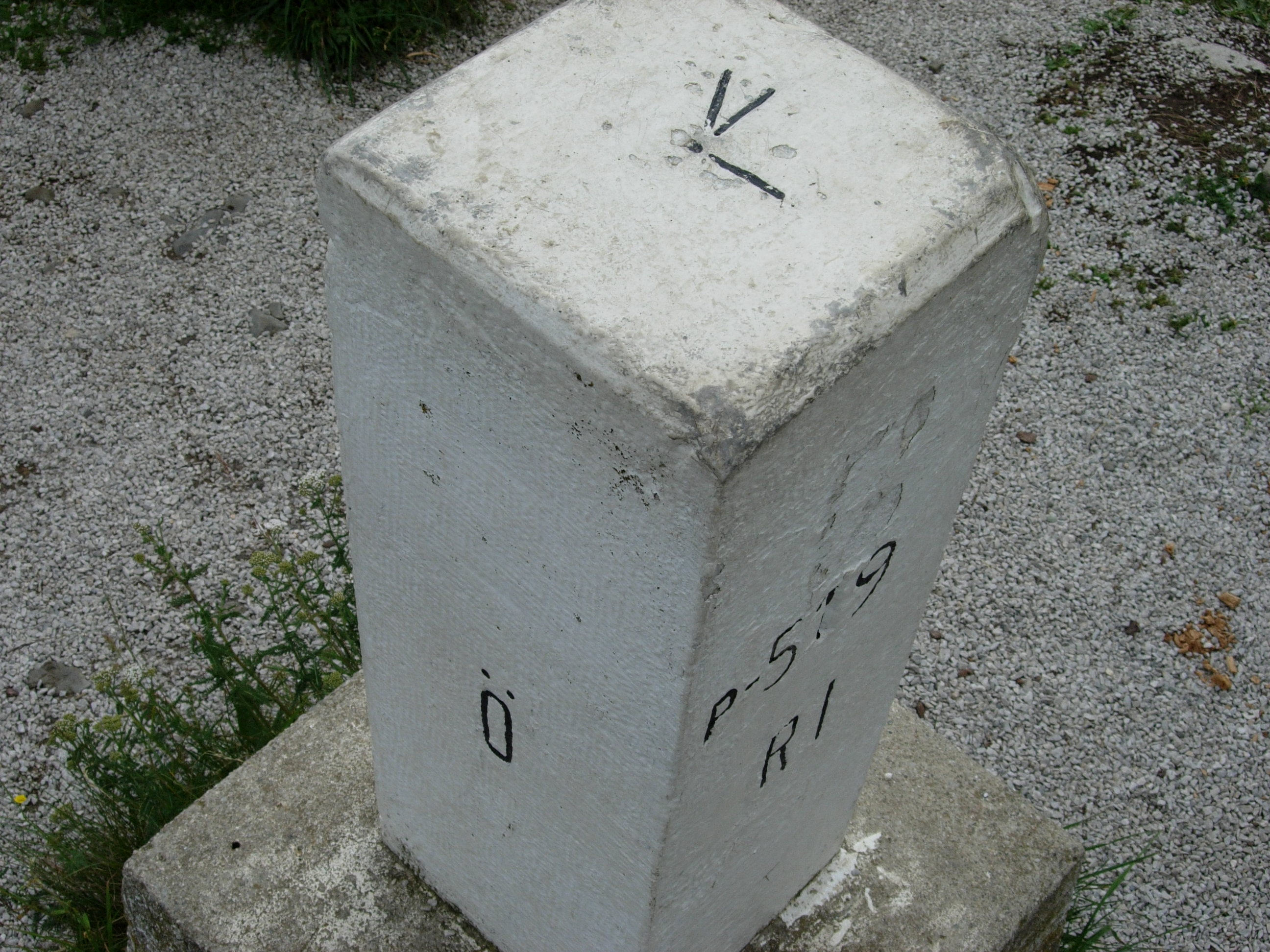
Boundary stone

== Name and languages ==
The mountain's German and Slovene names Ofen and Peč both mean 'cliff' or 'cave', although the Slovene word peč (which is also present in German as the loanword Pötsche) can secondarily mean 'oven'. The mountain's Italian name, Forno, means 'oven'. The contemporary German name Dreiländereck (literally, 'three-land corner'; i.e., 'tripoint') is a modern creation, as is the similar Slovene Tromeja (literally, 'tri-border').

Because three linguistic regions meet here, the mountain is comparable to the Dreisprachenspitze (German for 'three-language peak') on the Stilfser Joch.

== Development ==
The mountain has been developed into a skiing area with eight lifts and 17 km of piste served by the Dreiländereck Lift System (Dreiländereck Bergbahnen).
