= Dovška Baba =

- Frauenkogel
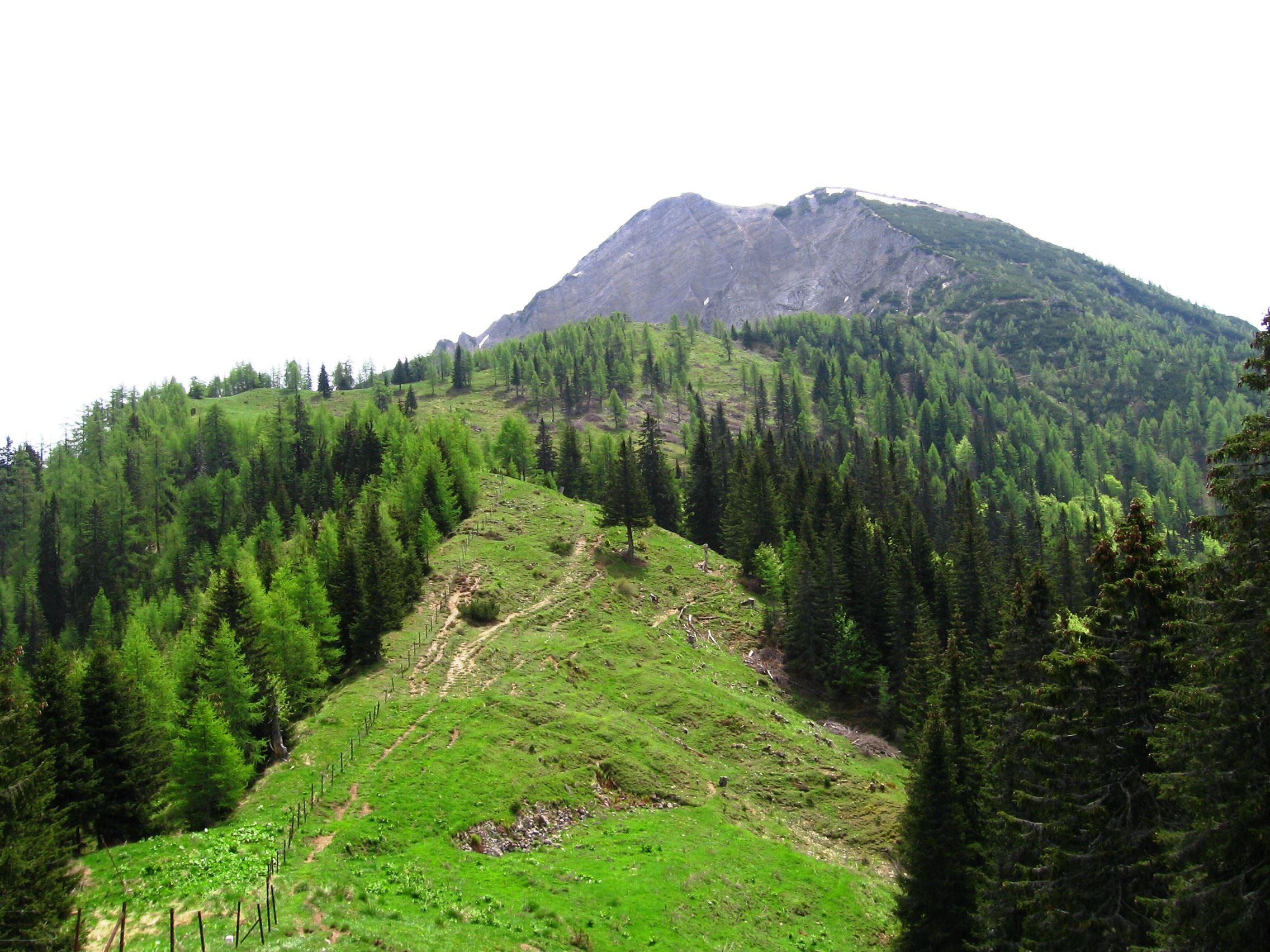

Highest point
- Elevation: 1,891 m (6,204 ft)
- Coordinates: 46°29′10″N 13°59′32″E

Geography
- Location: Slovenia - Austria
- Parent range: Karawanks

Dovška Baba (1,891 m), (German: Frauenkogel), also sometimes known as Dovška Rožca although this actually refers to a pasture some 200 m below the summit, is a peak in the Western Karawanks. It lies on the border between Slovenia and Austria, above the village of Dovje. It is known as an ideal peak for ski touring.

The German and Slovene names are etymologically related: Frauenkogel means 'Woman's Peak', while Dovška Baba means 'Woman of Dovje'. (Dovška Rožca means 'Little Flower of Dovje'.)
