= Karawanks =

Mountain range along the Austria–Slovenia border

- Karavankas, Karavanks
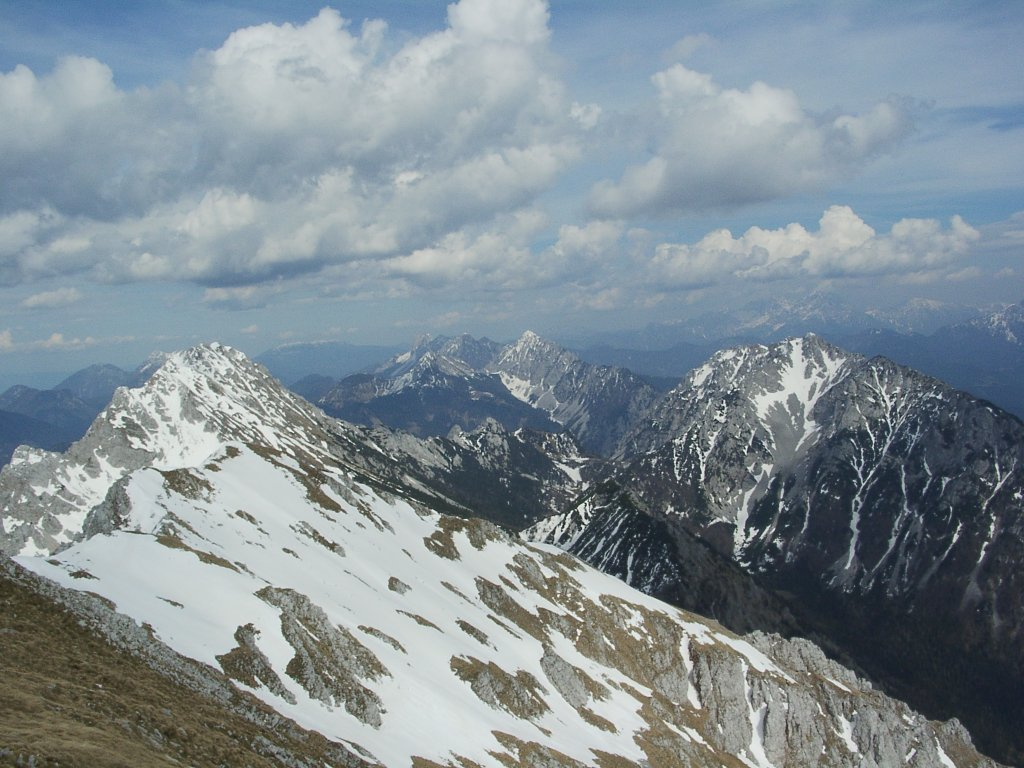
- View of the Eastern Karawanks from Hochstuhl/Stol

Highest point
- Peak: Hochstuhl / Veliki Stol
- Elevation: 2,236 m (7,336 ft)
- Coordinates: 46°26′3″N 14°10′24″E

Dimensions
- Length: 120 km (75 mi)

Geography
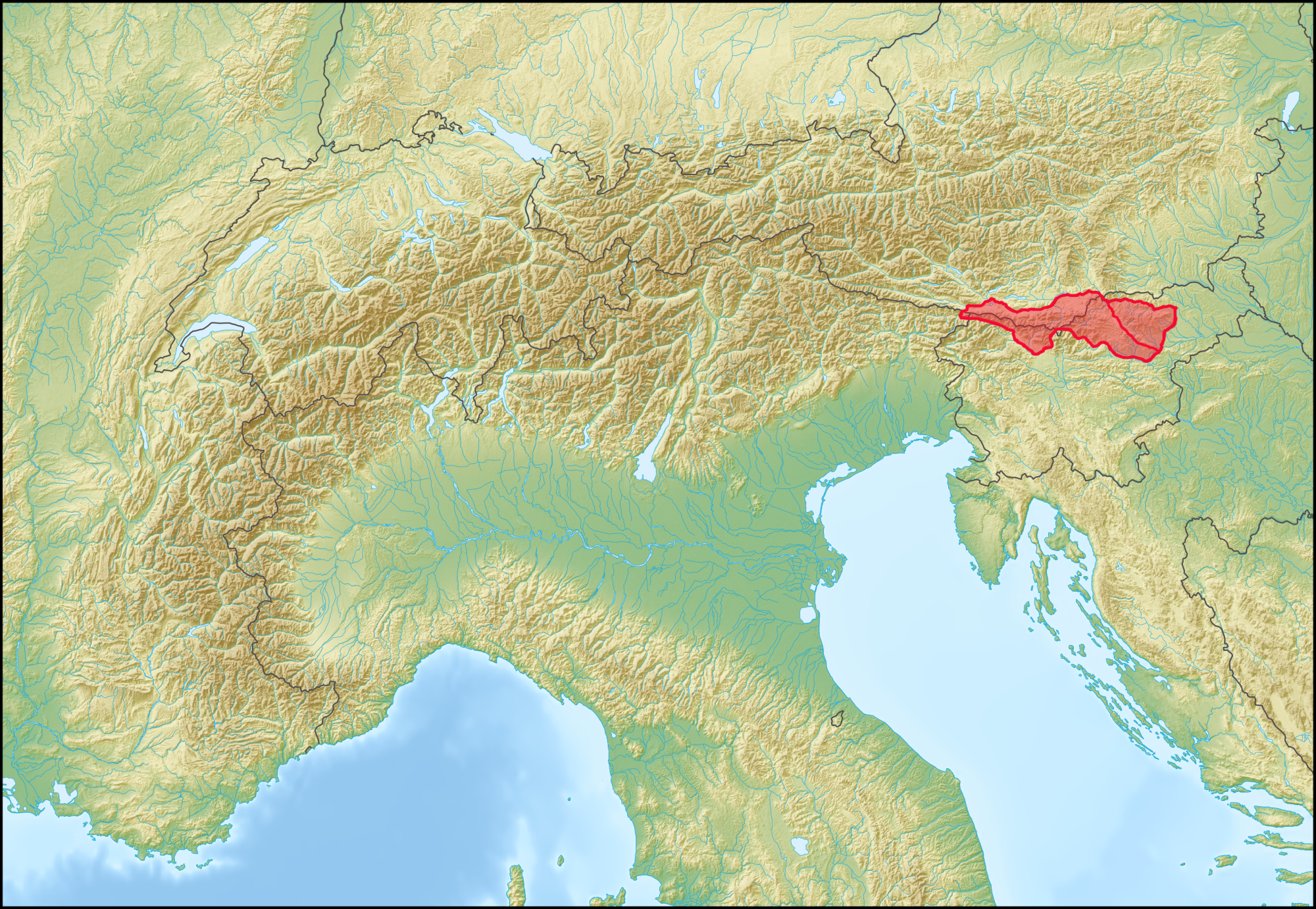
- The Karawanks (red, left) and Pohorje (red, right)
- Countries: Slovenia; Austria; Italy
- Range coordinates: 46°25′N 14°25′E
- Parent range: Southern Limestone Alps; Carinthian-Slovenian Alps

The Karawanks or Karavankas or Karavanks (Slovene: Karavanke; German: Karawanken, German pronunciation: [kaʁaˈvaŋkŋ̍]) are a mountain range of the Southern Limestone Alps on the border between Slovenia to the south and Austria to the north. With a total length of 120 kilometres (75 mi) in an east–west direction, the Karawanks chain is one of the longest ranges in Europe. It is traversed by important trade routes and has a great tourist significance. Geographically and geologically, it is divided into the higher Western Karawanks and the lower-lying Eastern Karawanks. It is traversed by the Periadriatic Seam, separating the Apulian tectonic plate from the Eurasian Plate.

Near the summit of the Dreiländereck (1,508 m) is the tripoint of the three countries: Austria, Italy and Slovenia.

== Geography ==
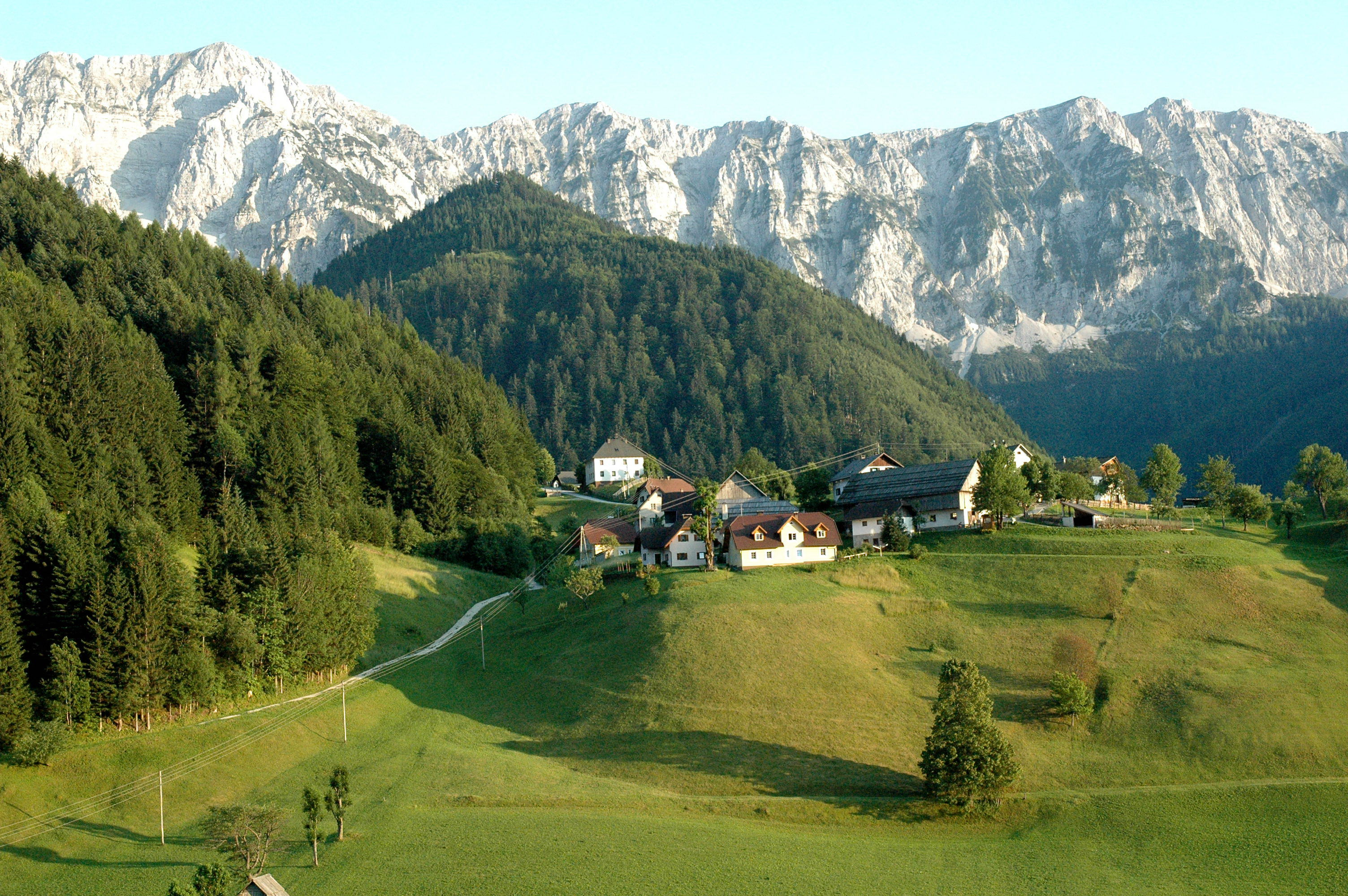
Koschuta/Košuta massif near Zell

The Karawanks form the continuation of the Carnic Alps east of the Slizza stream near the tripoint of Austria, Slovenia and Italy at Arnoldstein. They are confined by the Drava Valley in the north (called Rosental/Rož) and the Sava in the south, separating it from the adjacent Julian Alps. In the east, they border on the Kamnik–Savinja Alps and Pohorje ranges.

A number of mountain passes on important trade routes cross the range, like Wurzen (Korensko sedlo), Loibl (Ljubelj) or Seeberg (Jezersko), which have been used since prehistory. Nowadays the Austrian Karawanken Autobahn (A11) runs from Villach to the Karavanke motorway tunnel, which traverses the Western Karawanks connecting it with the Slovenian A2 motorway at Jesenice. A parallel railway line crosses the range through the Karawanks railway tunnel.

The Karawanks are a popular mountaineering area with numerous mountain huts. Many of the peaks offer a good view of the Klagenfurt basin on the Austrian side and the Ljubljana basin on the Slovene side. The northern Austrian side is rocky and precipitous while the Slovenian side is less steep, covered with spruce forests and low bushy pine at lower elevations with grass higher up.

== History ==
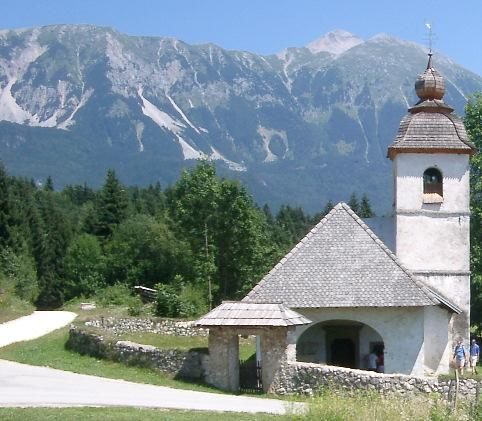
Hochstuhl / Veliki Stol, view from Zasip

The Karawanks were settled already in the Stone Age, as indicated particularly by findings from Potok Cave. In Roman times, they represented the southern border of the Noricum province, and later, of the Slavic principality of Carantania. The ancient geographer Claudius Ptolemy mentioned the Karwankas mountains about 150 AD. The name probably is derived from Celtic karv 'deer', a connection that has survived in the Košuta (Slovene for 'hind') massif.

From the first half of the 11th century, the Karawanks formed the border between the territory of the Duchy of Carinthia and the adjacent March of Carniola in the south. After Carniola had been elevated to a duchy in 1364, both lands became part of Inner Austria and were crown lands of the Habsburg monarchy from 1526 up to World War I. The northern slopes of the Karawanks had been historically settled by Carinthian Slovenes, nevertheless in October 1920, the Carinthian Plebiscite decided that the crest was the border between the Kingdom of Serbs, Croats and Slovenes (later Yugoslavia); only the municipality of Jezersko had already passed from Carinthia to Yugoslavia.

In the final weeks of the Second World War the Karawanks passes witnessed intense fighting. The 24th SS Kampfgruppe (battlegroup) commanded by SS-Brigadeführer und Generalmajor der Waffen-SS (Brigadier) Heinz Harmel was ordered to keep the Karawanken passes open between Yugoslavia and Austria. This task was critical in allowing German forces to withdraw from Yugoslavia in order to surrender to British rather than Yugoslav forces. The Kampfgruppe succeeded in its final task, and was one of the last German units to surrender, when it encountered the British 6th Armoured Division on 9 May 1945.

After World War II the Karawanks remained the border between Austria and the Socialist Federal Republic of Yugoslavia, and finally the independent Slovenia from 1991. Since the entry of Slovenia to the Schengen Area in 2007, a free movement of people and goods across the Karawanks has been allowed, and the two countries started to aim for an economic integration of their border areas.

== Notable peaks ==
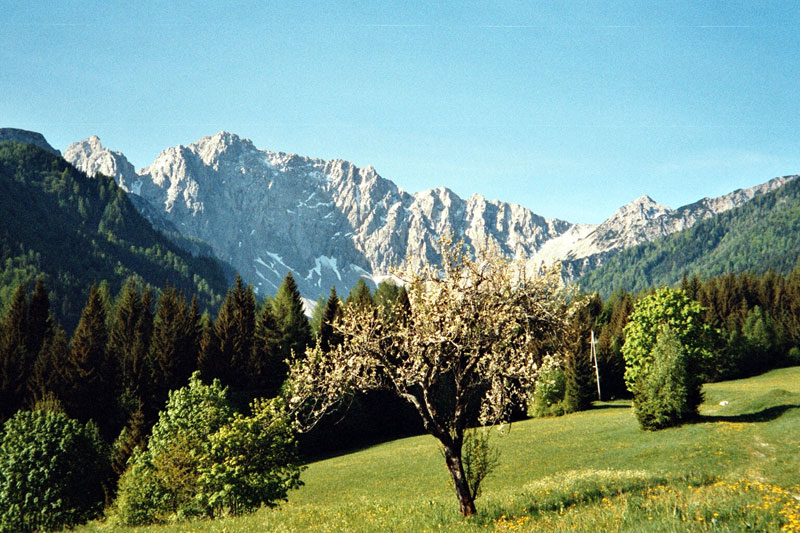
Boden Valley and Wertatscha

The place names have German as well as Slovenian names, and today the peaks along the main chain of the Karawanks are usually displayed in Slovene and German on hiking maps:

Peak	Elevation	
Hochstuhl / Veliki Stol	2,236 m	7,336 ft
Wertatscha/Vrtača	2,180 m	7,150 ft
Mittagskogel/Kepa	2,143 m	7,031 ft
Petzen/Peca	2,125 m	6,972 ft
Golica/Kahlkogel	1,836 m	6,024 ft
Wertatscha/Vrtača	2,181 m	7,156 ft
Koschuta/Košuta	2,133 m	6,998 ft
Begunjščica/Begunschitza	2,060 m	6,760 ft
Loibler Baba / Košutica	1,968 m	6,457 ft
Techantinger Mittagskogel / Trupejevo Poldne	1,931	6,335 ft
Ouschewa/Olševa	1,929 m	6,329 ft
Frauenkogel / Dovška Baba	1,891 m	6,204 ft
Hahnkogel/Klek	1,753 m	5,751 ft
Dreiländereck/Peč	1,508 m	4,948 ft

== See also ==
- List of mountains in Slovenia
- List of mountains in Austria
- Slovenian Mountain Hiking Trail

== Bibliography ==
- Poljak, Željko (February 1959). "Karavanke". Kazalo za "Hrvatski planinar" i "Naše planine" 1898—1958 (PDF). Naše planine (in Croatian). Vol. XI. pp. 29–30. ISSN 0354-0650.
