= Goldhorn =

Fictional animal character

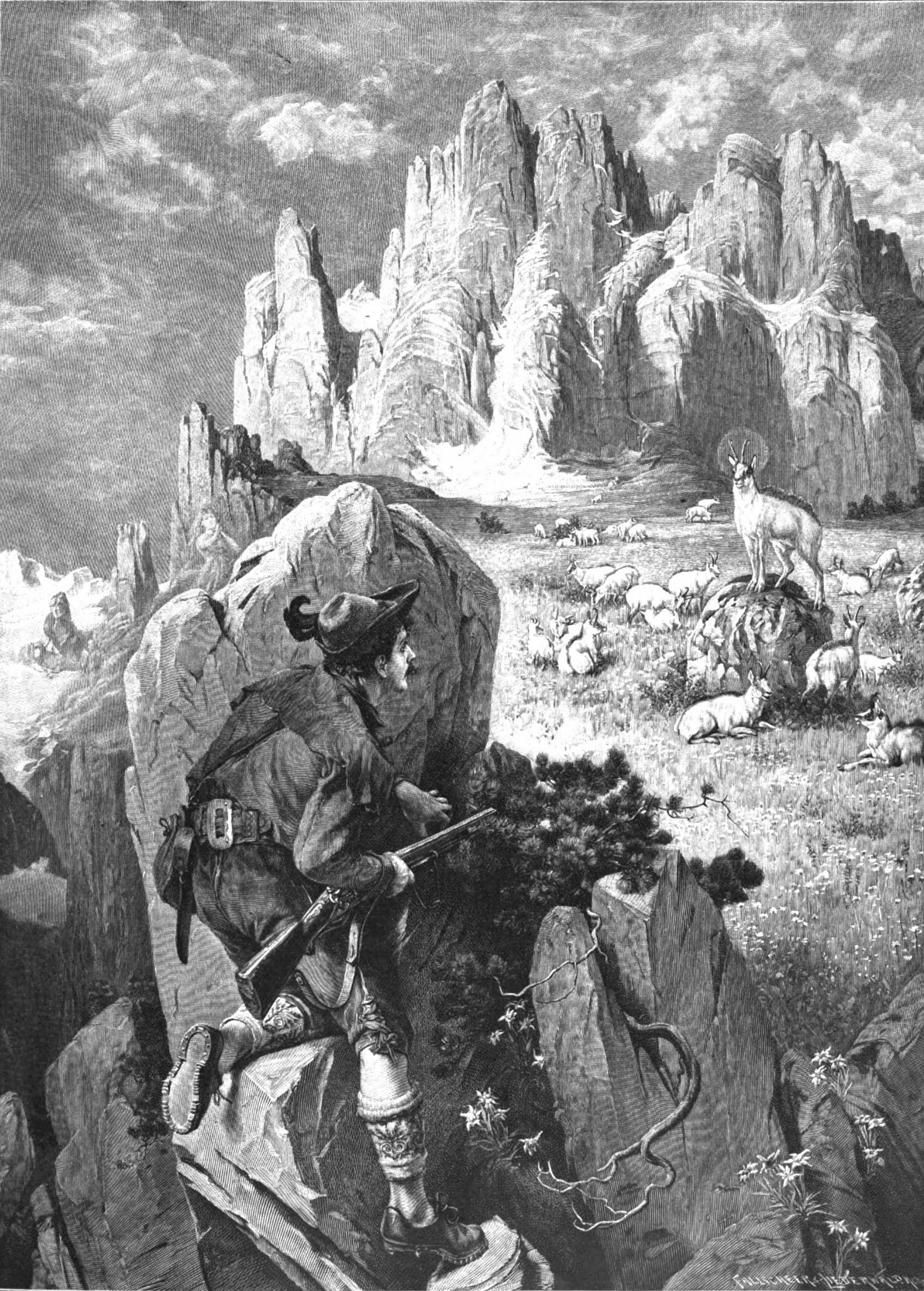
1899 illustration

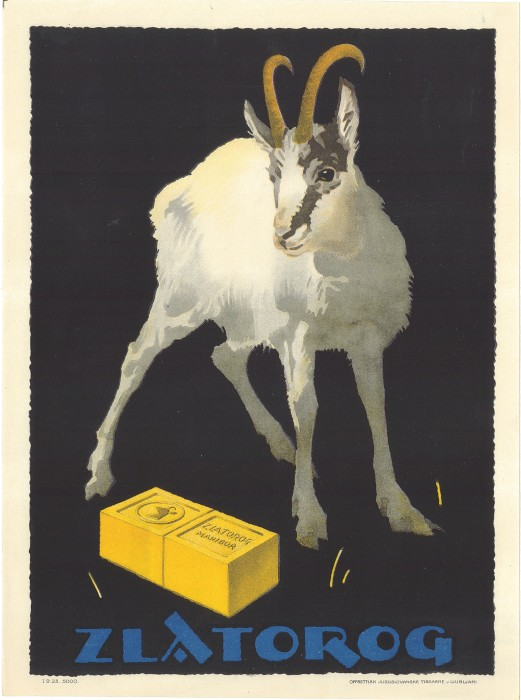
Zlatorog poster from Yugoslav Slovenia, 1920

Potentilla nitida, pink cinquefoil, aka "Triglav rose"

The Zlatorog (Slovene: Zlatorog, lit. 'Golden Horn'; (Note: Watling (1958): "Zlato" meant Golden, and "rog " meant Horn: The Golden Horn.) German and English: Goldhorn or Goldenhorn; German: Goldkrickel), in Slovene folklore, is a legendary white chamois buck (Note: Or an Alpine ibex. Kelemina (1930)'s version also makes the Zlatorog a kozol "goat", and the wild species of the Capra genus would be an kozorog "ibex", not a chamois which belongs to the genus Rupicapra.)),

Its realm lay in the heights of Mount Triglav, the highest mountain in Slovenia and the highest peak of the Julian Alps (Cf. § Geographical identifications).

Its glowing horn is supposed to be the key that gains entry into a cave in Mt. Bogatin (lit. 'Rich Man's Mountain', in Upper Carniola) filled with a hoard of gold and silver, guarded by a multi-headed serpent.

In the romantic tale, the Trentajäger (Trenta hunter) suffers a tragic death by fall in his attempt to hunt the Zlatorog's golden horn, the key to the treasure trove. He had hoped to obtain the treasures so he could impress his sweetheart with the wealth.

Nowadays, the legend is well known throughout Slovenia (especially Carinthia).

== Summaries ==
=== Deschmann (1868) ===
The Zlatorog's golden horns were reputed to be the key to a hidden treasure of Mount Bogatin. A young hunter from the Trenta Valley won the heart of a beautiful girl at a popular inn in the Bovec area, bringing her game (ordinary chamois and capercaille (Note: German: Auerhahn.)) and bunches of flowers. She got a bit arrogant, and when wooed by a rich merchant from Venice who showed her a golden ring a strand of pearls, she mocked her boyfriend for not having brought her the "rose of Triglav". The youth retorted that he could obtain the key to the treasure (Zlatorog's horn) and while he becomes richer and grander than the Venetian, she can stay the barmaid. He left the inn sore-hearted. Along the way, he encountered the Green Hunter (grüne Jäger), with a reputation of sending many upstanding youths to their grave, and at the nefarious man's instigation, he decided to take up the hunt in earnest. By the morning, they have tracked down the Zlatorog, and the hunter's bullet stuck its mark. The wounded chamois fled along the precarious icy, rocky path. The Trenta Hunter noticed an edelweiss which he used to gather to make an eye tonic for her blind widowed mother. The memory of her voice seemed to counsel him to abandon the hunt, and just gather the Triglav roses, and his sweetheart will surely come to her senses. But the Green Hunter egged him forward, to catch the Goldhorn in time. They followed the trail of bloodstained roses, but it was too late: the Zlatorog had already eaten the miraculous balm (i.e., the leaves of the Triglav rose) and was revitalized. The chamois's golden horns gleamed brighter than ever, and the dazzled hunter fell into the abyss. In the springtime, the Isonzo (Soča) river swollen from the snowmelt brought his corpse ashore, holding a bouquet of the roses of Triglav. (Note: Briefly summarized by Stanonik (1962))

Deschmann also inserts a different legend which does not fit into the above plotline, though it involves a Venetian merchant. The gold and silver hoard was guarded by a multi-headed serpent (mnogoglavakača ) in Mt. Bogatin (lit. 'Rich Man's Mountain'). A gold-seeker from Venice hid at the entrance of Mt. Bogatin, and witnessed the zlatorog touch the serpent and tame it into a docile state, permitting the chamois to dip its horn into the golden stream that ran through the cavern. The snooper later found a piece of horn scraped off on a rock by the animal, and with that "key", obtained the gold cache.

=== Baumbach (1877) ===
In Rudolf Baumbach's Zlatorog (1877) the storyline is as follows:

A white-coated and gold-horned chamois buck (Note: German: Gemsbock<German: Gemse "chamois" + Bock "buck, ram, billy".) serves as guardian of the Alpine terrain, which is also occupied by fairies called the Rojenice (cf. § Rojenice below). The chamois's golden horns are the only key to the treasure cavern, but the beast drives away any intruders with the flashes of his horn. If injured by hunters, it recovers by eating the magic red rose of Mt. Triglav that grows from the spot where it has dripped its blood. The daring Trentajäger (hunter of Trenta Valley), who is a favorite of the Rojenice, seeks to hunt the Goldhorn in order to win the treasure for his sweetheart, disregarding the warnings of the fairies. The hunter is killed; the dismayed fairies depart from the paradisal land, and the chamois kicks down a pile of rock to bury and seal the place.

== Geographical identifications ==
The basic plotline and Geographical settings (Jeserzathal/Jezéra/Triglav Lakes Valley, (Note: Jeserzathal mentioned in the opening of Deschmann, translated into Slovene as Dolina Zajézeram.) (Note: Kropej translates this opening as "Jezéra (mountain pasture by the Triglav Lakes)"; she further glosses in her Slovenian work that this was "formerly known as Planina Jezéra or Pri Jezérih; today, it is a flat area near the hut by the Triglav Lakes".) Trenta Valley, Mt. Triglav, in the Julian Alps) are the same in either Deschmann's or Baumbach's version.

Thus the protagonist is the Trentajäger (Trenta hunter), and the magic healing plant is the Triglav-rose (German: Triglaurosen, Triglavrose; Slovene: Triglavska roža), identified as the "pink cinquefoil" (Potentilla nitida).

While Mt. Triglav spans over the Littoral and Upper Carniola regions, the legend was half-forgotten, except locally in the pocket around Trenta Valley in the Goriška (Northern Littoral) region, (Note: Such as the bolški (Bovec, Littoral) herdsmen) until commemorated in the romantic tale published in German by Karl Deschmann (1868), and subsequently in verse by Rudolf Baumbach (1877), the latter of which became better known and became the basis of § Musical adaptations.

== Character study ==
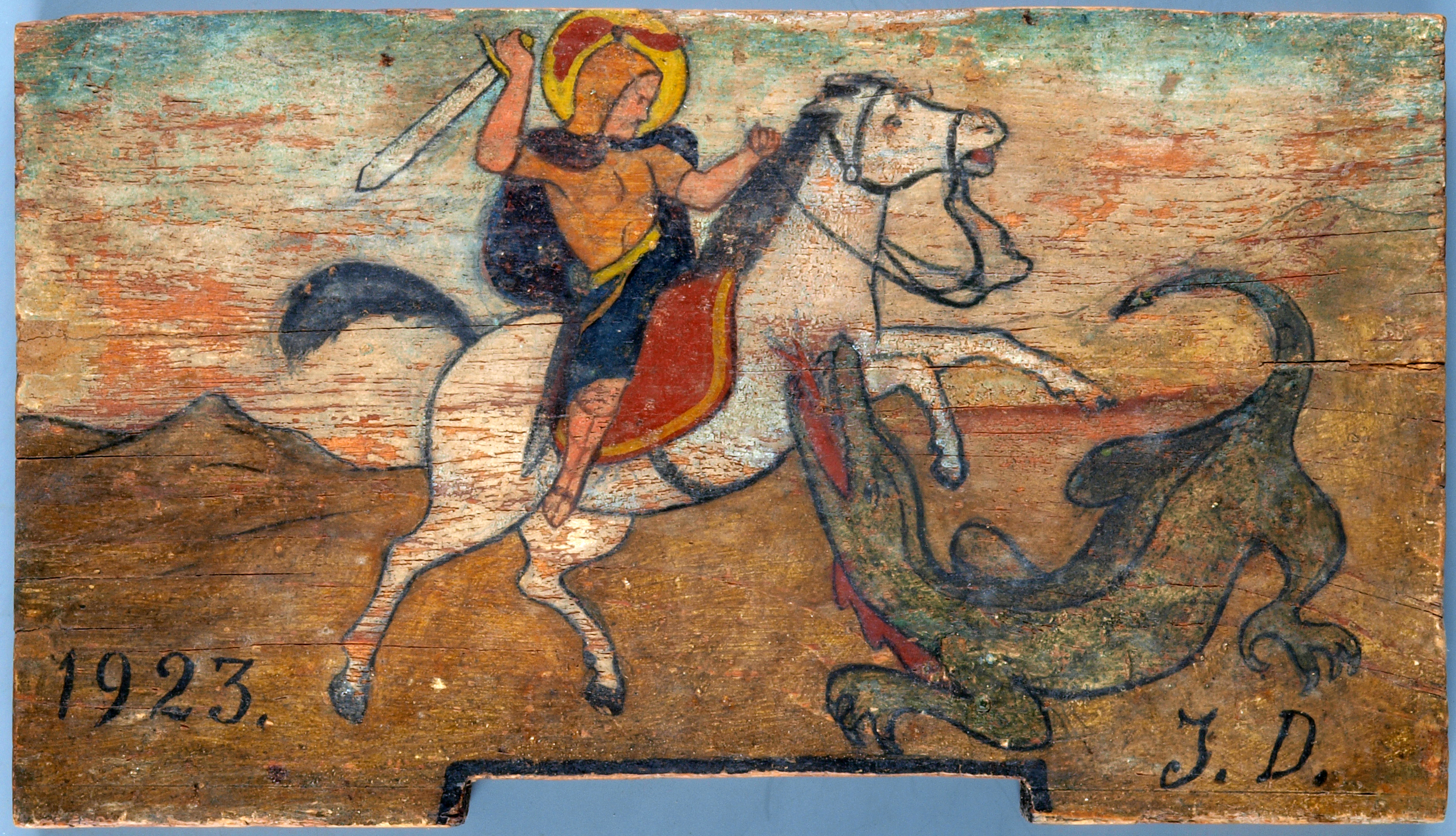
Saint Jurij against the zmaj dragon. —Beehive panel painting, 1923

Baumbach replaced the figure of the sinister Green hunter (German: Der grüne Jäger, Slovene: Zeleni lovec) with the "Brown Špela" (German: die braune Špela) a type of alpine dairymaid.

It is commented that the Green hunter is such a fixture in the myth, that Baumbach's replacement was really untenable. Jakob Kelemina has explained that the Green Hunter actually represents Jarnik the poacher, the evil half-brother of Green George (Zeleni Jurij, conflated with St. George). Jarnik, having killed his elder brother, is condemned to hunt forever in the night, herding a pack of wolves. Kelemina also argues that Zlatorog represented Jarnik's older brother, and the representation would have been a gold-horned stag (jelen), though this has been regarded skeptically. (Note: Since all the Alpine attestations say it was a chamois. A deer would only make sense if it were the folklore of the lowlands, since Alpine habitat is not conducive of deer behavior.)

=== Rojenice ===
The tragic hero Trenta-hunter is under the protection of mountain spirits who are called in Slovene the Rojenice (rendered in German as the Weiße Frauen by Deschmann (Note: Deschmann gives "Weiße Frauen" in the main text, but he footnotes the Slovene name.) (Note: Some Slovene source refer to the White Ladies (bele žene) in describing the Zlatorog legend.)). They are said to be three sisters. (Note: One sets the yarn, the second spins it, and the third cuts it at the time of death. This suggest comparison with the Old Norse nornir.) Other sources identify the Slovene Rojenice as fate-goddesses (the Fates), (Note: Schicksalsgöttinnen "Fate-goddesses", as Baumbach provides in his appended remarks.) (Note: Valjavec (1857) translated into German by Klun, cf. Brednich (2020), p. 133, n55.) but another source finds better analogy with the Salige Frau of Alpine folklore. (Note: Deschmann footnotes that the Rojenice is identifiable with the vila of Serbian and Bulgarian folklore, but Baumbach in disagreement considers the vile to be closer to the Valkyries of old and thus different.)

== Printing history ==
The story about Zlatorog was first written down, in a version "infused with Romantic embellishment" by the learned Slovenian Karl Deschmann (Karel Dežman) (Note: Kretzenbacher (1968), p. 137 "Deschmann-Fassung herum, auch wenn in sie ganz offenkundig vieles an romantischer Ausschmückung hinein vermengt ist") in the Laibacher Zeitung, no. 43, on 21 February 1868.

The poet Rudolf Baumbach subsequently published a version in verse Zlatorog (1877), which became his first successful work. (Note: After the court actor Joseph Lewinsky began reciting it in public, the reprint came into high demand and some 20,000 copies were printed.) The knowledge of Zlatorog becoming widespread is owed to Baumbach's version, and while some sources assumed this was taken from Deschmann, (Note: Insinuated by Josef Šuman (1881) that the Baumbach's adaptation had its original form in Deschmann (whose version he subsequently quotes).) other sources accepted on surface that Baumbach obtained the Zlatogrog material from local acquaintances during his sojourn to Trieste. (Note: Now part of Italy, but then part of the Habsburg Empire. Just as Deschmann was a politician in Slovenia under the Austrian regime.) In fact, Baumbach had been introduced to Deschmann's text by Viljem Urbas, a high school teacher in Triest, as clarified by Monika Kropej.

Baumbach's work was translated into Slovene by Anton Funtek in 1886.

The Slovenian poet Anton Aškerc wrote a fairy-tale play, Zlatorog: Narodna pravljica izpod Triglava ("Goldhorn: A Folk Tale from beneath Mount Triglav"), published in Ljubljana in 1904, which more freely took creative license than Baumbach.

It is argued that the phenomenon called the folkloristic "feedback loop" (Rücklauf) is at work here, where folkloric material treated literarily is injected back to the "folk" in a more refined shape than the crude original.

Thus, when the Slovene folklorist Jakob Kelemina included a version in his Bajke in pripovedke slovenskega ljudstva ("Myths and Legends of the Slovenian People"), a book meant for the general audience, the story was nothing more than a retelling of Deschmann's, except for a few minor changes.

== Musical adaptations ==
This was subsequently adapted into an opera Der Trentajäger ("The Deer Hunter") by composer Albert Thierfelder, and libretto in German by Ludwig Ottomeyer, based on Baumbach's poem. First performed 1 August 1883 in Brandenburg.

Subsequently Viktor Gluth composed another opera, under the title Der Trentajäger using Baumbach's text, in 1864/1865 and rewritten in 1911.

Then Hans Schmitt wrote the opera Bruna (1894) loosely based on Baumbach's text. Georg Wilhelm Rauchenecker wrote one as well (Zlatorog, 1903).

The Austrian-Croatian poetess Camilla Lucerna crafted the Baumbach's verse into a Singspiel libretto c. 1900, to which her composer brother Eduard Lucerna provided the score, to complete the opera.

Viktor Parma also wrote an opera, in 1919.

== Cultural references ==
The first Slovene-language, full-length film, directed and shot in 1931 by Janko Ravnik bore the title V kraljestvu Zlatoroga ("In the Kingdom of the Goldhorn") in reference to the beast.

Zlatorog is also a brand of beer produced by the Laško Brewery.

== See also ==
- Carbuncle (legendary creature) – one of the South American legendary creature whose glow or light is said to indicate the whereabouts of treasure
- Heathen Maiden
- White stag
- Wild man and Wild woman - general category including protectors of the chamois such as:
  - Fängge
  - Salige Frau
  - Wildmannli
