= Razor (mountain) =

Mountain in Slovenia

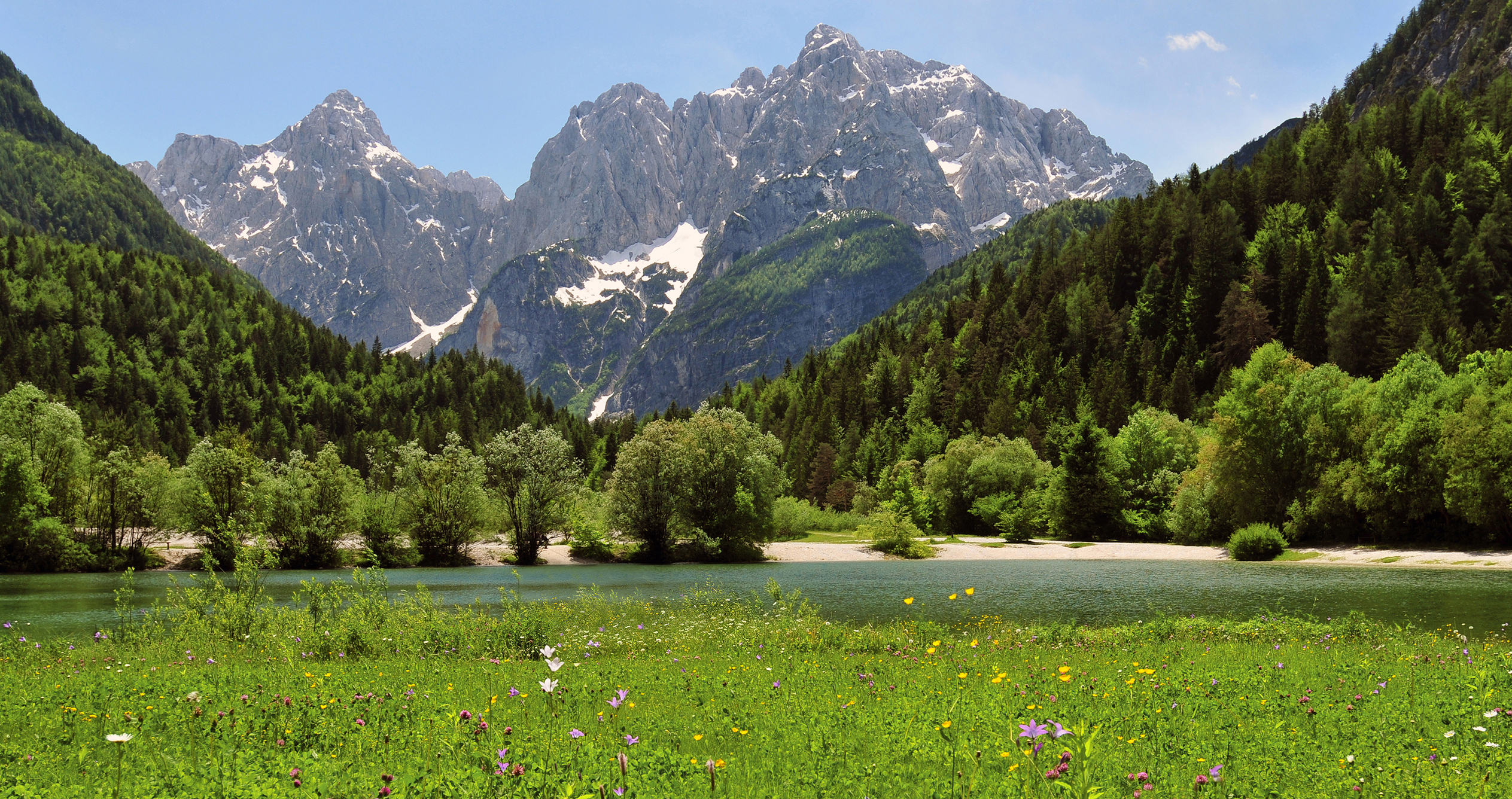
- Razor (left) and Prisojnik (right) from Lake Jasna near Kranjska Gora

Highest point
- Elevation: 2,601 m (8,533 ft)
- Prominence: 332 m (1,089 ft)
- Coordinates: 46°24′47″N 13°47′20″E

Geography
- Location within Alps
- Location: Slovenia
- Parent range: Julian Alps

Geology
- Mountain type: Pyramidal peak

Climbing
- First ascent: 1842, Otto Sendtner

Razor (2,601 metres or 8,533 feet) is a pyramidal mountain in the Julian Alps and the sixth-highest mountain in Slovenia. First ascended by Otto Sendtner in 1842, it is now frequently ascended, with numerous mountain huts available for climbers.

== Location and description ==
Razor is part of the Julian Alps in Slovenia, and is bordered by the Luknja and Vršič passes to the east and west, and the Krnica and Trenta valleys to the north and south. Together with its neighbouring mountain Prisojnik, it serves to connect Triglav and Jalovec. It is included in Triglav National Park and is administratively part of Kranjska Gora.

The mountain is located in a limestone karst region, with the Križ Plateau (Kriški podi) below it being a typical example. The area has been heavily shaped by erosion, caused by glaciation, rivers, and precipitation; as a result, it has many caves, sinkholes, and limestone pavements.

== Climate ==
Razor is snow-covered from November to early June.

Climate data for Kredarica, Slovenia (station located at Triglav)
Month	Jan	Feb	Mar	Apr	May	Jun	Jul	Aug	Sep	Oct	Nov	Dec	Year
Mean daily maximum °C (°F)	1 (34)	3 (37)	8 (46)	12 (54)	17 (63)	21 (70)	22 (72)	22 (72)	18 (64)	13 (55)	6 (43)	1 (34)	12 (54)
Mean daily minimum °C (°F)	−5 (23)	−4 (25)	−1 (30)	3 (37)	8 (46)	11 (52)	12 (54)	12 (54)	8 (46)	6 (43)	1 (34)	−4 (25)	4 (39)
Source: Weather Underground

== Ascent ==
Razor was first ascended in 1842 by botanist Otto Sendtner. Since then, numerous mountaineers have ascended the mountain. The more challenging routes are located on the mountain's northern and western faces (1,200 and 900 metres (3,900 and 3,000 ft) high respectively) and have via ferrata sections, while the southern and eastern (600 metres (2,000 ft)) faces are considered non-technical ascents. The most common routes are from the west, south, and east.

Although Razor can be ascended year-round, its ascent is easier between mid June to October. At other times, the snowy conditions call for specialized equipment. There are six mountain huts on Razor, at heights ranging from 1,015 to 2,050 metres (3,330 to 6,726 ft). The main hut is the Pogačnik Lodge on the Križ Plateau (Pogačnikov dom na Kriških podih), standing on its southern side. The climber and writer Julius Kugy gave Razor the nickname "The Royal of the Julian Alps".
