= Prisojnik =

Mountain in Slovenia

Prisank
- Prisojnik
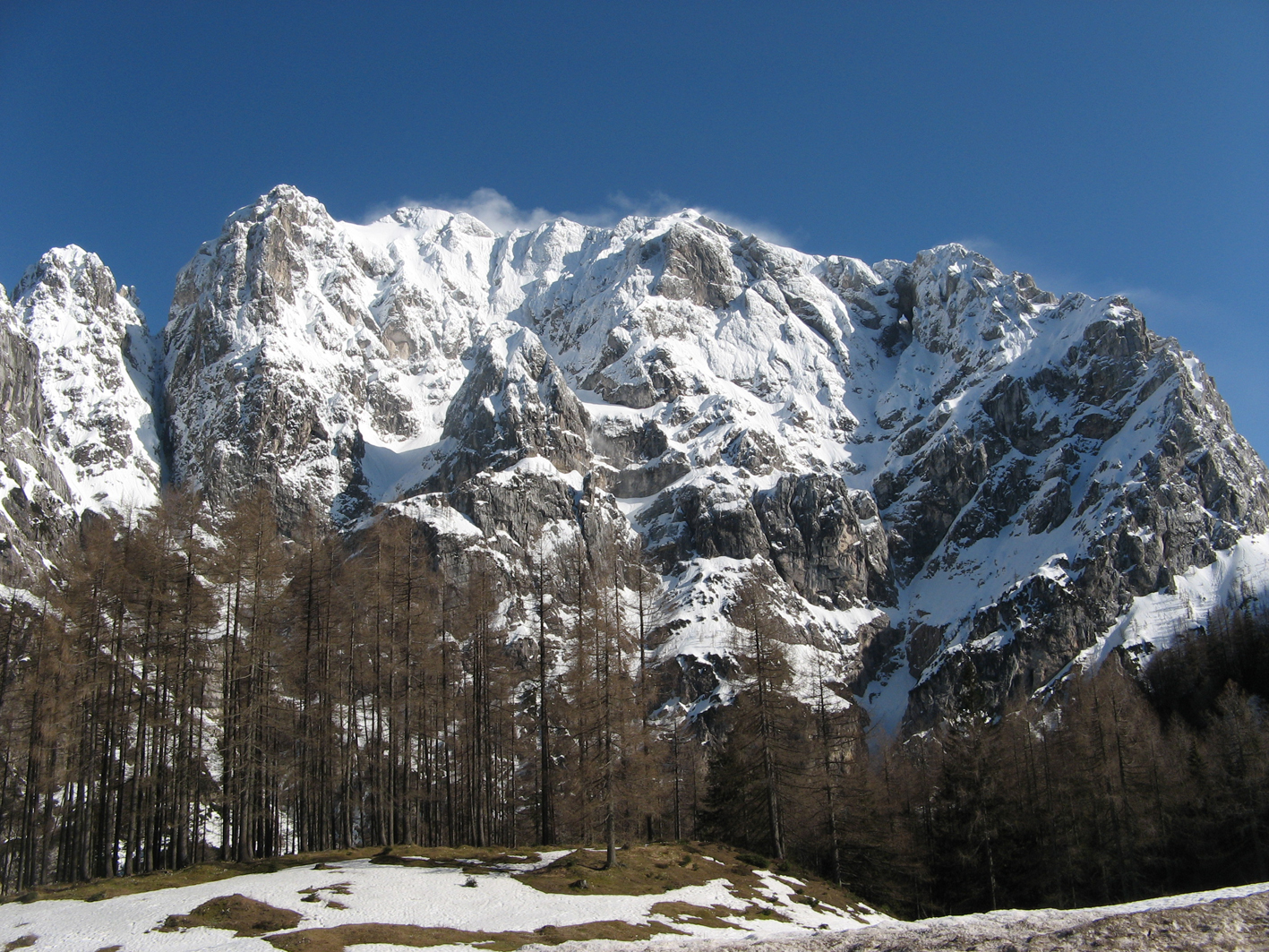
- Prisank/Prisojnik

Highest point
- Elevation: 2,547 m (8,356 ft)
- Prominence: 547 m (1,795 ft)
- Listing: Alpine mountains 2500-2999 m
- Coordinates: 46°15′N 13°28′E

Geography
- Location within Alps
- Location: Slovenia
- Parent range: Julian Alps

Prisojnik or Prisank is a mountain of the Julian Alps in Slovenia, the 18th tallest peak in the country at a height of 2,547 m. A popular hiking and climbing destination, it is located immediately above the well-traveled Vršič Pass, from where most ascents begin.

== Etymology ==
The mountain's name derives from *Prisъln(ьn)ikъ, composed of the prefix pri- 'by, at' + the root *sъlnь 'sun' + the noun-forming suffix -(n)ikъ, literally meaning 'the one near the sun'. The designation refers to the fact that, seen from the north, the sun travels across the mountain during the course of the day.

The peak is known as Monte Prisani in Italian. Unusually for a prominent feature in the Julian Alps and less than 10 km from the modern Austrian border, it has no common German name.

== History ==
In the interwar period, the Rapallo Border between the then-kingdoms of Yugoslavia and Italy had run along the top of the Prisojnik ridge.

== Mountaineering ==
Prisojnik boasts two natural erosion arches, the larger of which (the Prednje Okno, "Front Window") is about 50 m high; both it and the smaller Zadnje Okno ("Rear Window") can be transited, the former by a via ferrata.

The mountain best-known feature is the Heathen Maiden (Slovene: Ajdovska deklica), a paredoilic rock formation on the mountain's steep northern face. Folk belief in the surrounding area has traditionally identified it as a vila (Slavic nymph or fairy) dwelling in the mountain.

There are several marked approaches to the summit:

- The easiest is the southern approach (also known as the Slovene Route) runs from Vršič (1611 m).
- A more demanding approach is from the ridge above the Prednje Okno natural arch, also starting from Vršič.
- The southern slope above Mlinarica is gentler, and branches off to a marked path leading to Razor (2601 m).

More demanding approaches include:

- Hanza's Route (a different path with the same name also leads to nearby Lesser Mojstrovka): opened in 1926, named after the Trenta Valley guide Ivan Vertelj - Hanza. Starts at the Koča na Gozdu chalet (1226 m).
- Kopiščar's Route: opened in 1948, named after the Trenta guide Anton Kravanji - Kopiščar. Starts at Erjavec Lodge near Vršič (1515 m) and passing through the Prednje Okno arch, where it joins the ridge path.
- Jubilee Route: opened in 1953, on the occasion of the 60th anniversary of the Alpine Association of Slovenia. Connects Prisojnik to Razor via the eastern ridge of Prisojnik and passes through the Zadnje Okno arch.
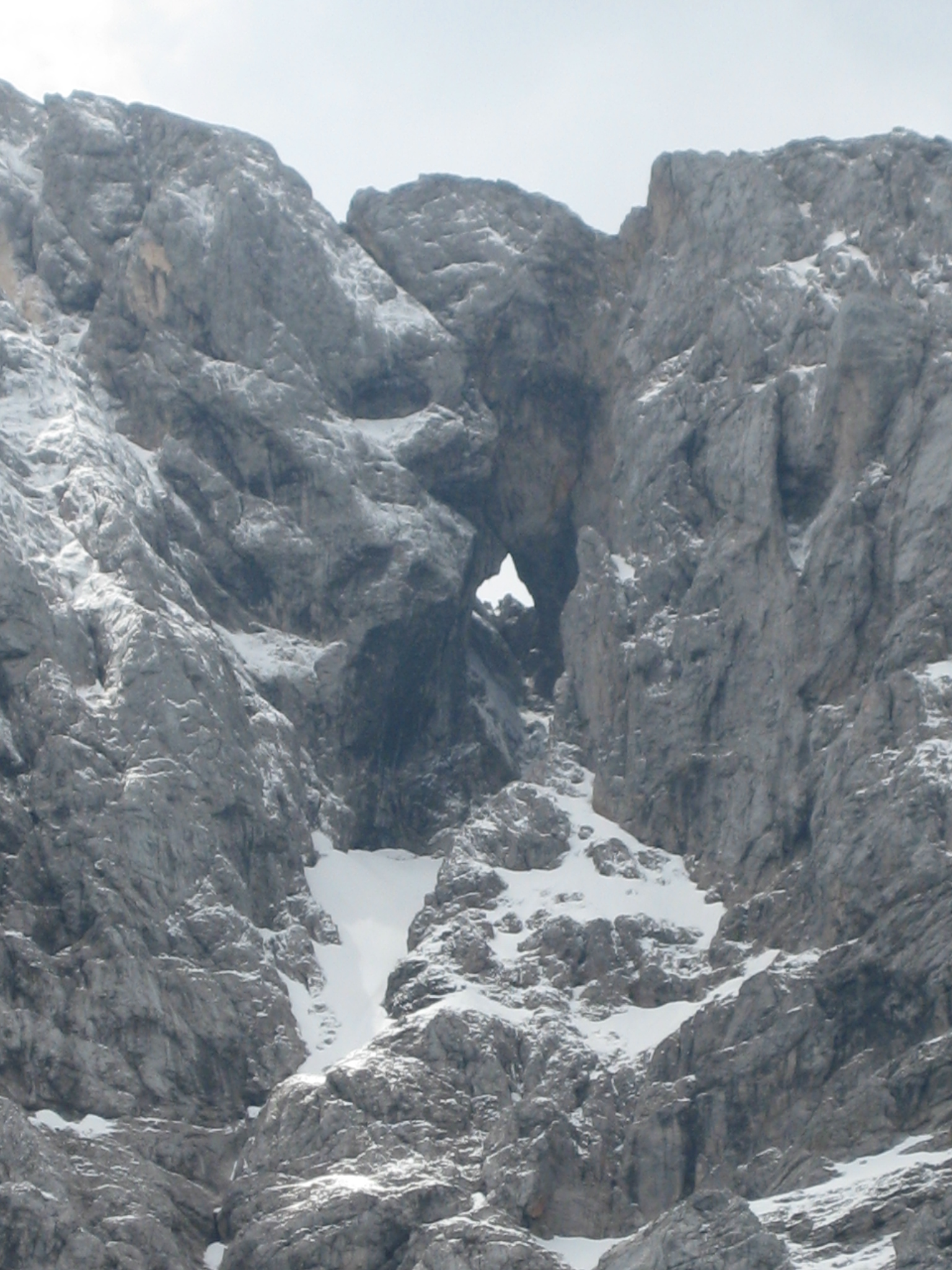
Prednje Okno, the larger of the two rock windows

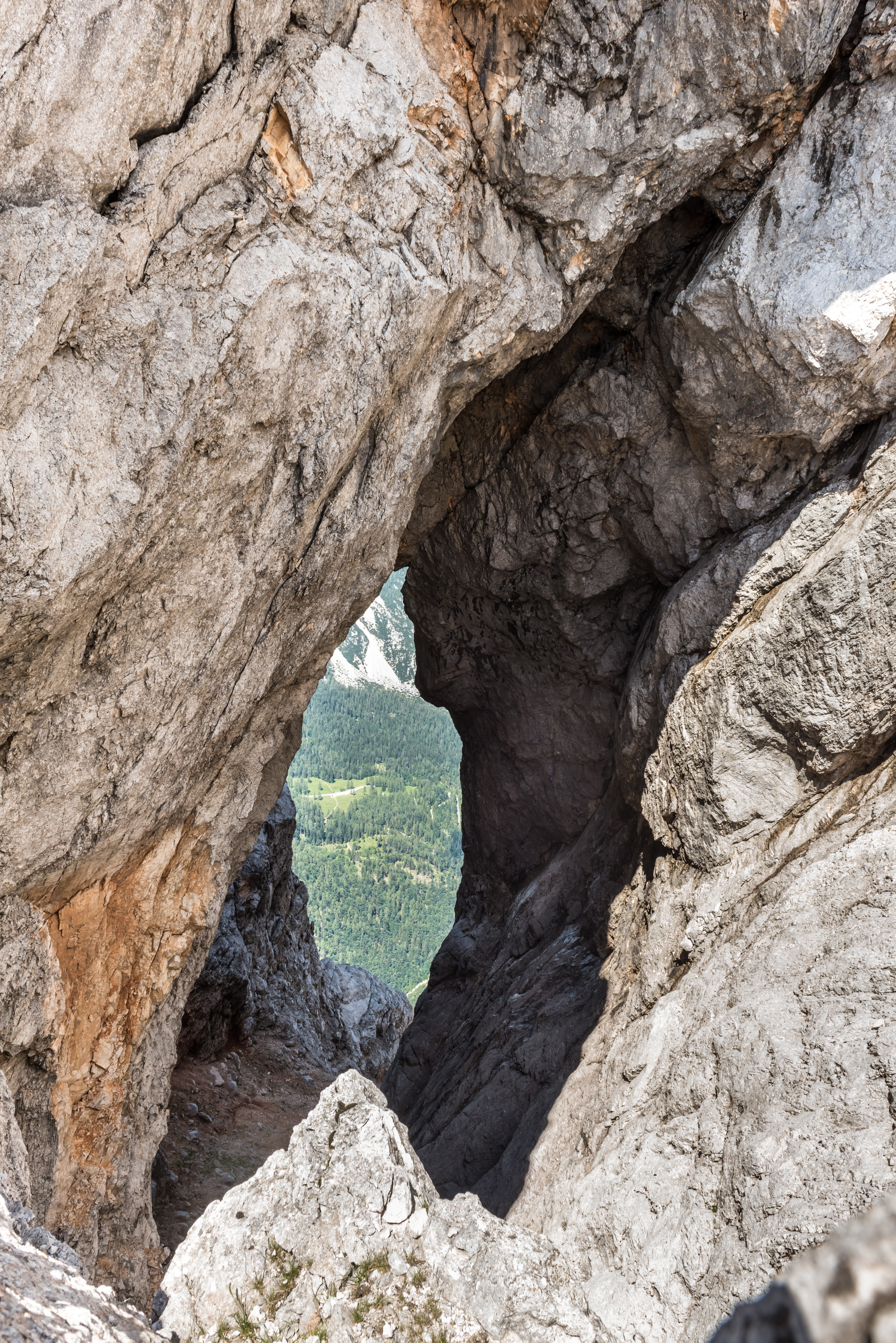
Northward view through the Prednje Okno

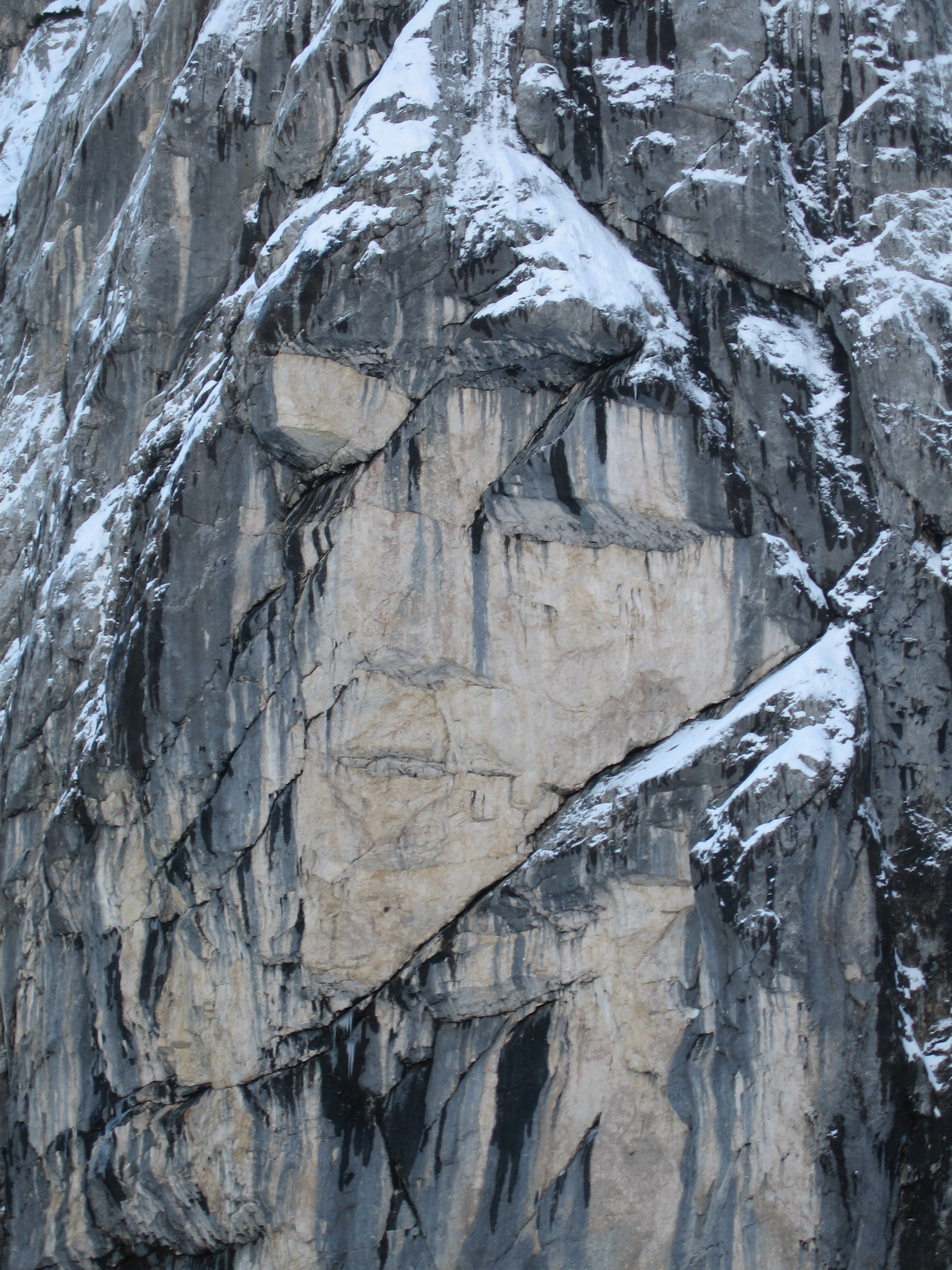
The pareidoilic erosion feature Ajdovska deklica

== Geology ==
Prisojnik is composed of a sequence of Triassic rocks which form part of the Julian nappe. The well-preserved carbonate rocks display a complete platform-to-basin cycle, dating back approximately 240 million years. The mountain's structure makes it an important field locality for studying the geological development of the Julian Alps in relation to the opening of the Tethys Ocean.

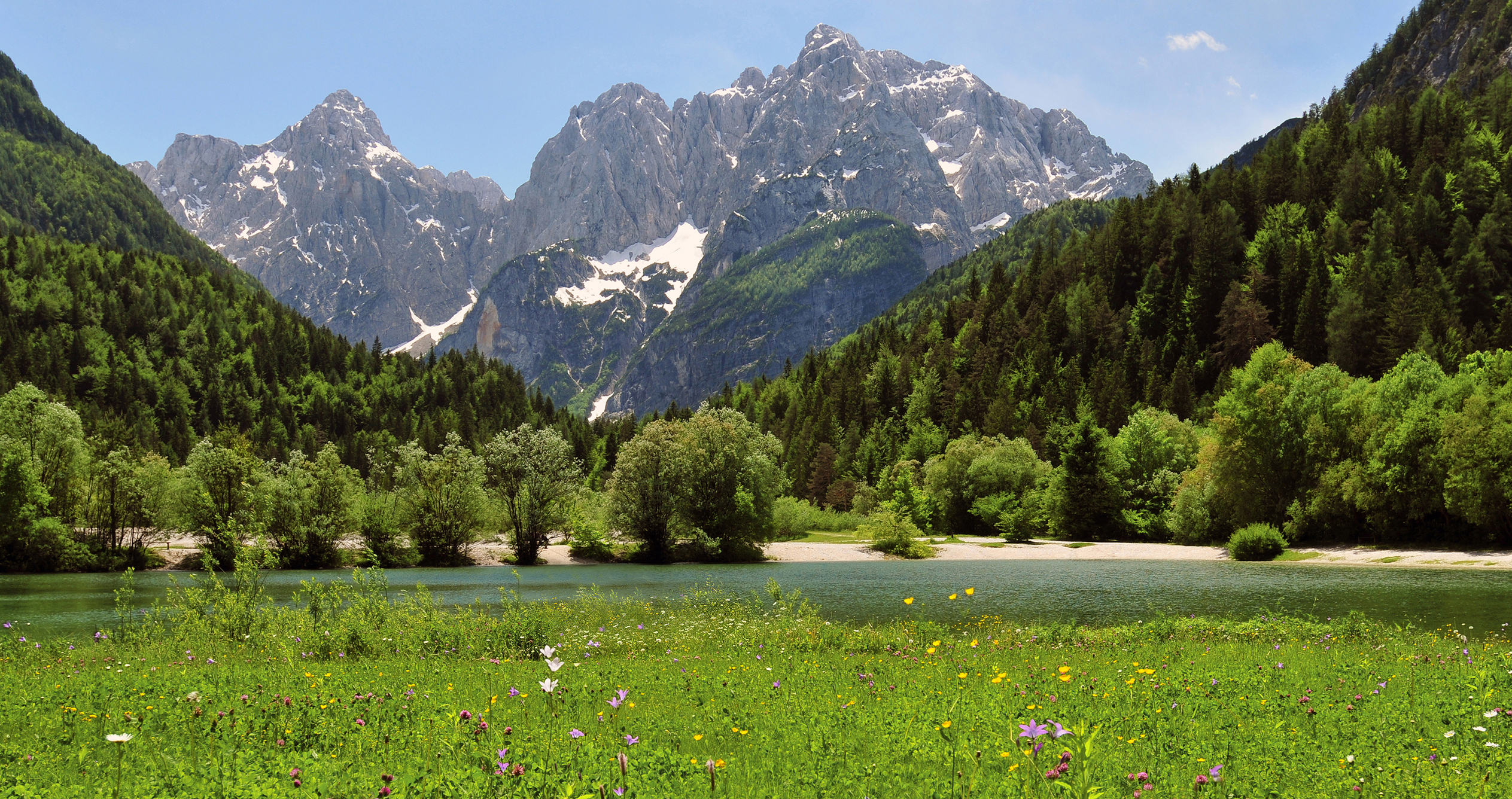
Razor (left) and Prisojnik (right) from Lake Jasna near Kranjska Gora

The lower slopes of the mountain expose up to 200 m of massive grey limestone assigned to the Contrin Formation, deposited in a warm, shallow-marine setting roughly 240 million years ago. Above this limestone geologists have mapped thin, red, nodular layers of the Loibl Formation—deep-water lime-mud packed with radiolarians (microscopic plankton) and paper-thin bivalves—showing that the former platform suddenly drowned and was submerged beneath deeper water. Tiny fissures called neptunian dykes cut down into the Contrin limestone and are filled with the same red mud, confirming that faulting opened cracks while the new seafloor sediments were settling.

Overlying the red pelagic beds are green tuffs and thin rhyolite lava flows that record short-lived volcanic activity connected with the same extensional tectonics. These volcanic rocks grade upward into 25 m of thin-bedded grey limestone of the Buchenstein Formation, rich in re-worked algae and shell fragments transported downslope from neighbouring shoals. The summit wall is made of more than 500 m of massive, partly dolomitised limestone belonging to the Schlern Formation, which represents the renewed growth of a shallow-water carbonate platform during the Ladinian to early Carnian stages of the Triassic.

The full succession shows that Prisojnik stood on the tilted margin of a small half-graben—a fault-bounded block that sank gently along one side while the opposite side rose. As the block subsided, the platform surface drowned, deep-water muds and volcanics accumulated in the depression, and finally the basin was rapidly infilled by carbonate debris as the platform prograded back across it.

== Biology ==
Lepidoptera include Zygaena transalpina.
