= Rabič =

Rabič is a Slovene surname. Notable people with the name include:

- Simon Rabič, birth name of Simon Robič (1824–1897), Slovenian priest and naturalist
- Urška Rabič (born 1985), Slovenian former alpine skier
