= Viktor Gluth =

Bohemian-German composer

Viktor Gluth (6 May 1852 in Plzeň – 17 January 1917) was a composer. He was born in the Austrian Empire and later moved to Germany. He was professor at the Königliche Akademie der Tonkunst (Royal Academy of Music) in Munich.

== Compositions ==
- Der Trentajäger [Zlatorog], with Rudolf Baumbach (Munich, 1885; rewritten Munich, 1911)
- Horand und Hilde, with Rudolf Baumbach (Munich, 1914)
- Et Resurrexit
