= Heathen Maiden =

Rock formation in Slovenia

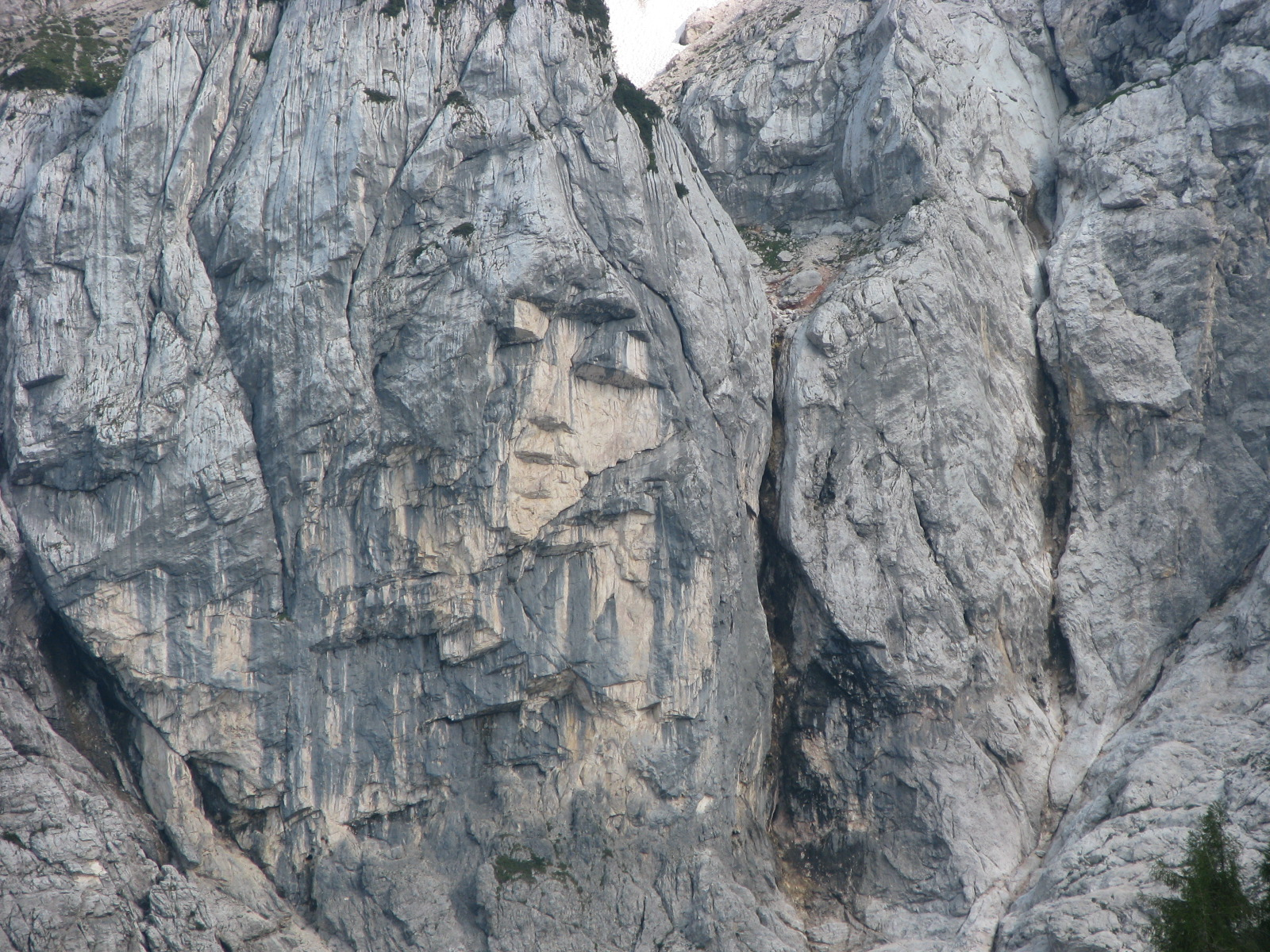
The Heathen Maiden seen from the Erjavec Lodge

The Heathen Maiden (Slovene: Ajdovska deklica) is a rock formation that resembles a human face. It can be seen in the northern face of Mount Prisojnik near Kranjska Gora, in the Julian Alps in northwestern Slovenia. It is associated with a legend about a chamois known as Goldenhorn and a nymph (vila) dwelling in the mountain.

== Legend ==
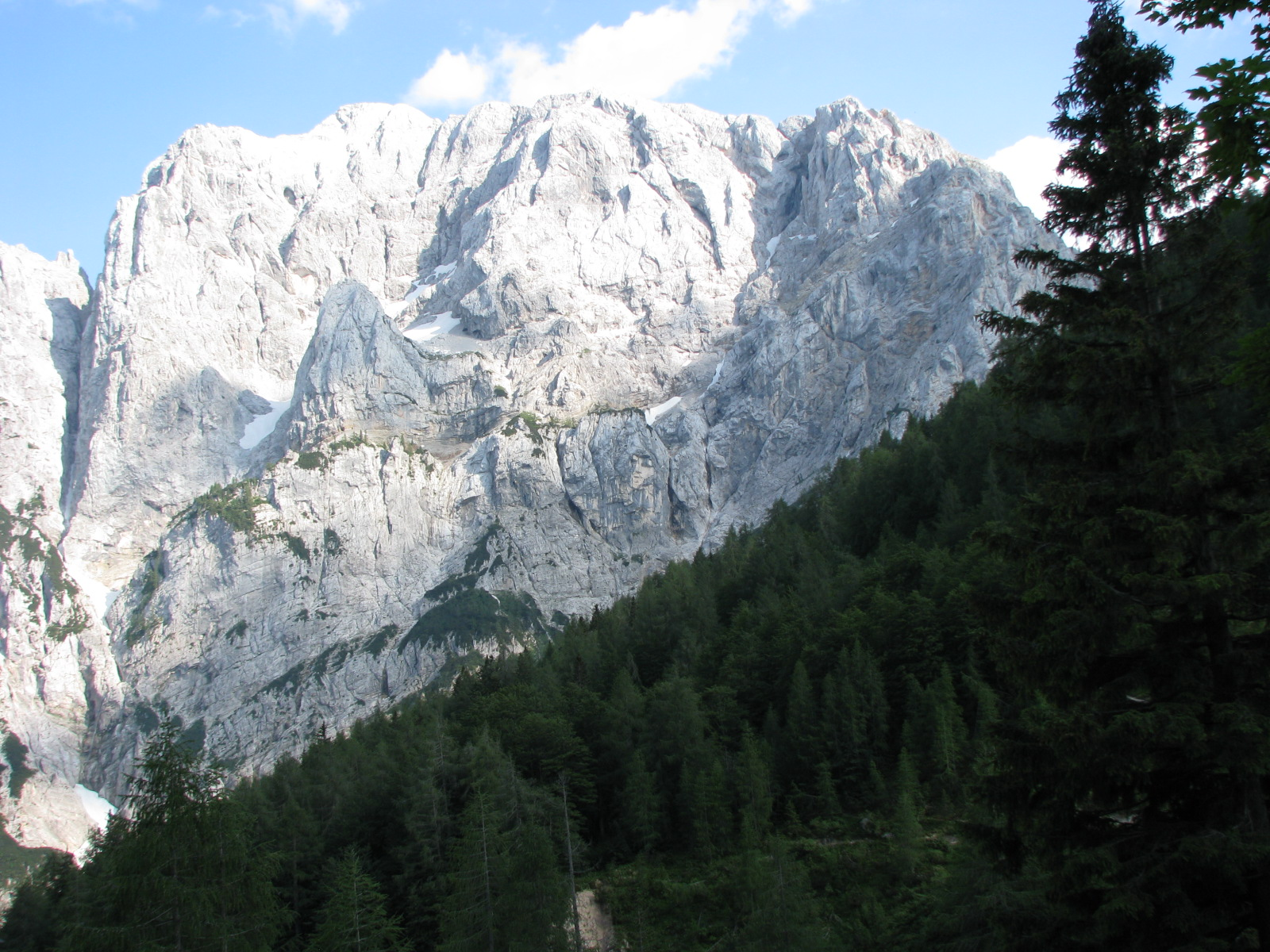
The Heathen Maiden in the center

A nymph once foretold that a newborn would kill the chamois known as Goldenhorn. Upon hearing her prophecy, the other nymphs punished her by turning her into a rock.
