= Russian Chapel (Vršič Pass) =

Coordinates: 46°26′33.28″N 13°46′3.82″E

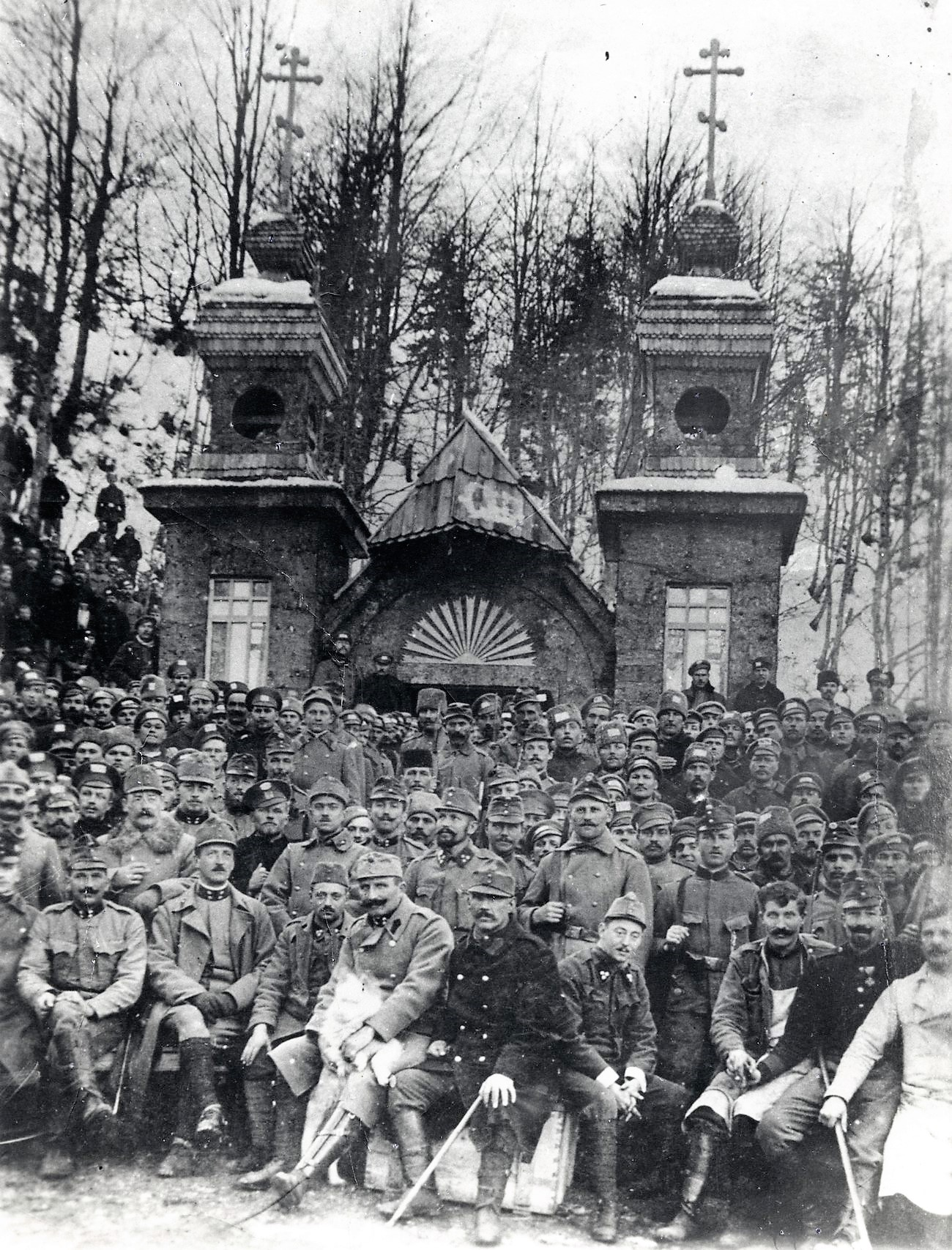
Russian chapel in 1916 (built by Russian prisoners of war); the front row are Austro-Hungarian guards

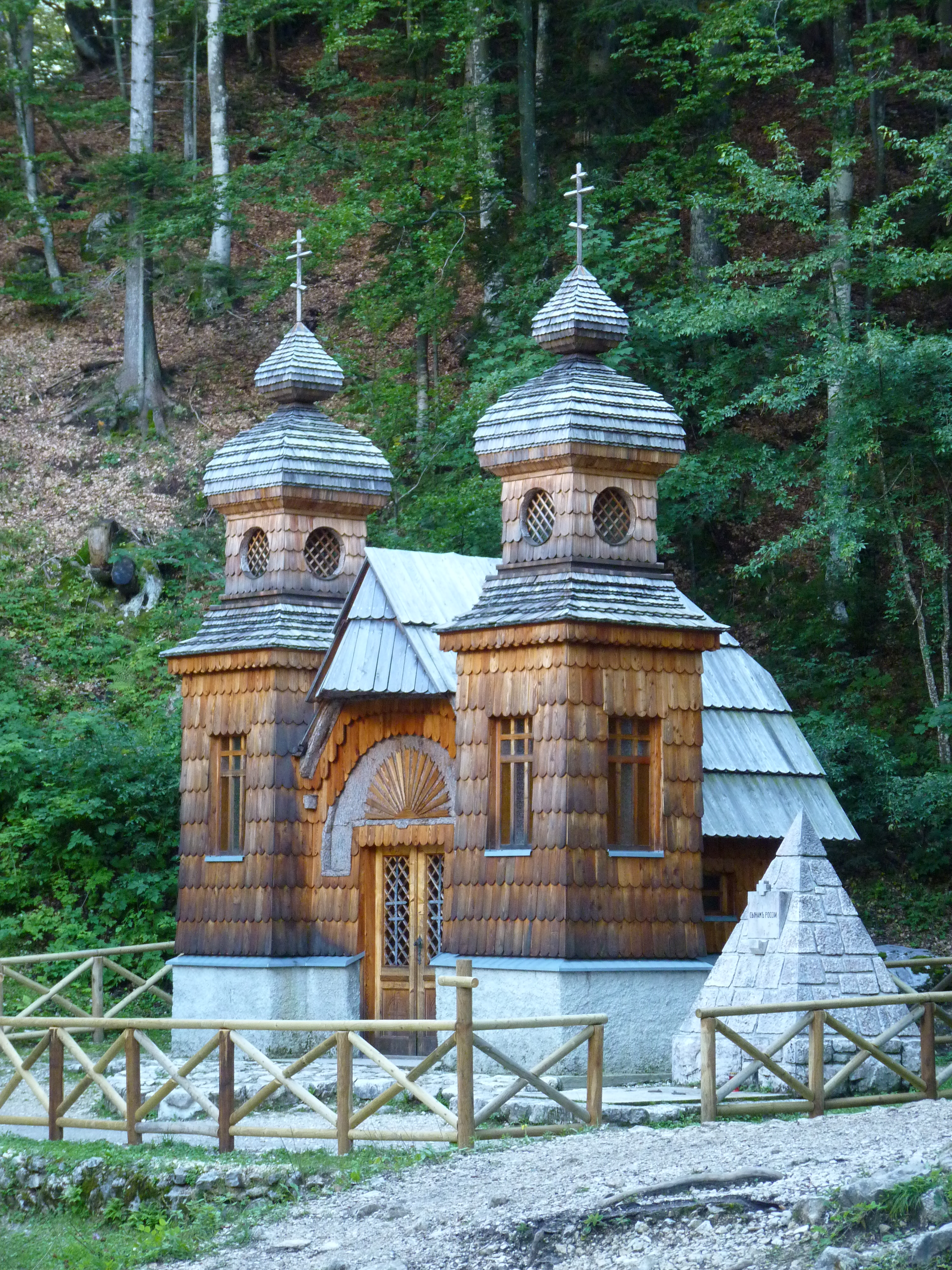
Russian Chapel at the Vršič Pass in 2014

The Russian Chapel (Slovene: Ruska kapelica) is a Russian Orthodox chapel located on the Russian Road on the northern side of the Vršič Pass in northwestern Slovenia. The chapel, dedicated to Saint Vladimir, was built by Russian (actually members of various Slavic nations and Volga Germans that were part of the Russian Empire) prisoners of war engaged in forced labor in the area during World War I. It serves as both a war memorial and a symbolic link between Slovenia and Russia.

== History ==
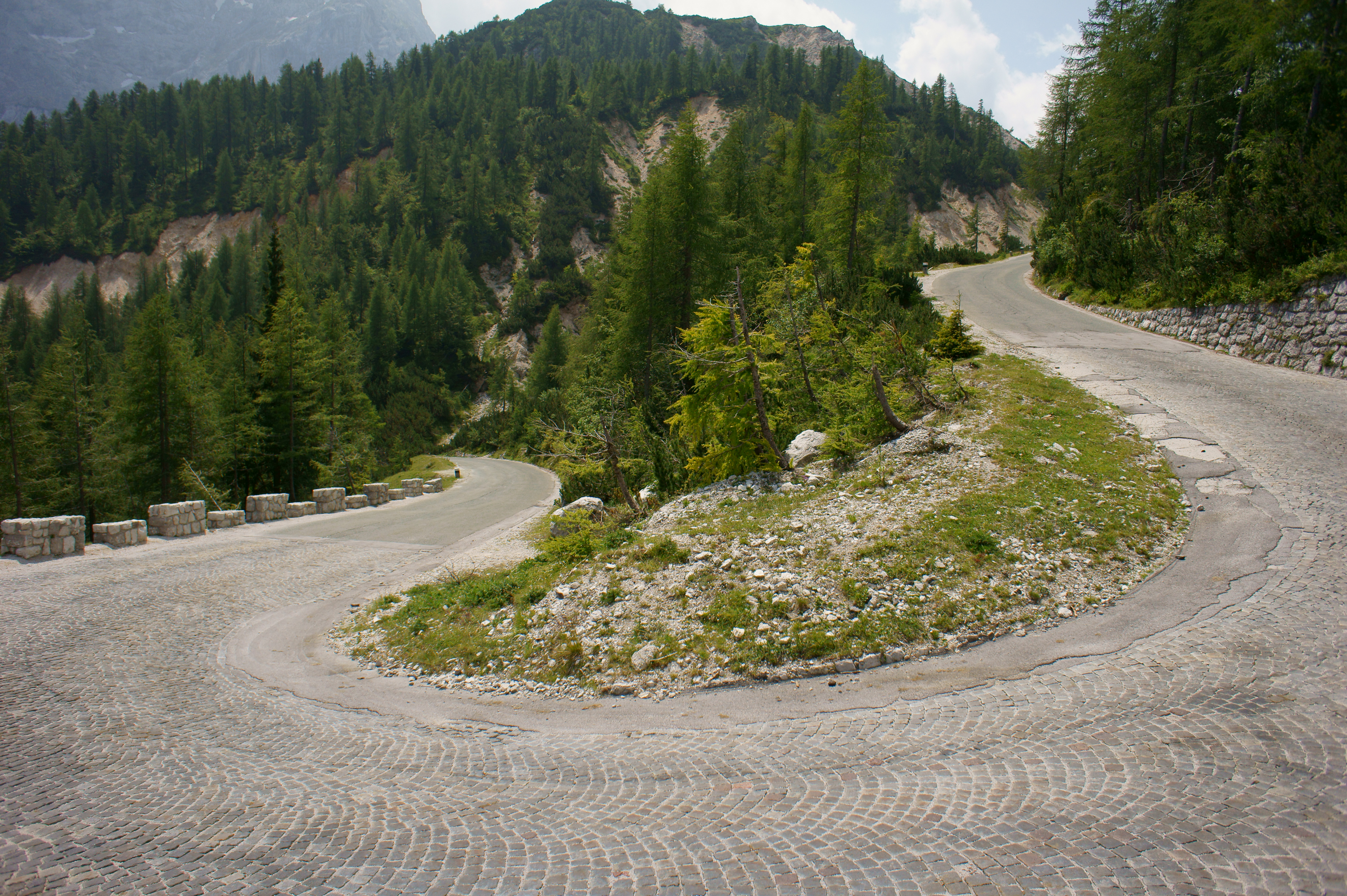
Russian Road to the Vršič Pass

In early 1915, the small town of Kranjska Gora suddenly became strategically important due to its proximity to the Isonzo Front. To facilitate access from the town to the front, the Austro-Hungarian authorities ordered the construction of a military road across the Vršič Pass, a 1,611-meter (5,285 ft) pass between the Sava and Soča Valleys, to be built by Russian prisoners of war (POWs).

The road was begun in May 1915, and was completed by the end of the year. To ensure an uninterrupted supply of materiel to the front lines, the pass was to be kept traversable year-round, and the POWs were forced to clear the road of heavy snowfall. On 8 or 12 March 1916 (sources vary), an avalanche buried a POW work camp. In 1916 and 1917, 106 prisoners, 18 guards, and one unknown person died in avalanches.

The Russian camp was located roughly halfway up the slope of Vršič. The prisoners built a small wooden chapel for their religious needs that was completed in 1915 or at the latest in January 1916. The building is of typical Russian design, with two small towers on either side of the nave. There is a grave of the war prisoner Peter Polowchev next to the chapel and a pyramid-shaped tomb of unknown POWs immediately to the right of it, with the Cyrillic inscription reading "To the sons of Russia". The tomb is work by the master builder Josip Slavec from 1937–1938.

The site was renovated in 2005, at a cost of €90,000, and again in 2010 after a theft of the copper roof plates. The pass road on the Kranjska Gora side from the Erika Hotel to the top was renamed "Russian Road" (Ruska cesta) in June 2006.

In 2016, the chapel was visited by Russian president Vladimir Putin. The visit has been criticised by Branko Soban, a Slovenian journalist specialising in Russia, as a severe political mistake giving legitimacy to Putin's politics. Soban has proposed renaming the chapel to Ukrainian Chapel.
