= Lake Jasna =

Lake in Slovenia

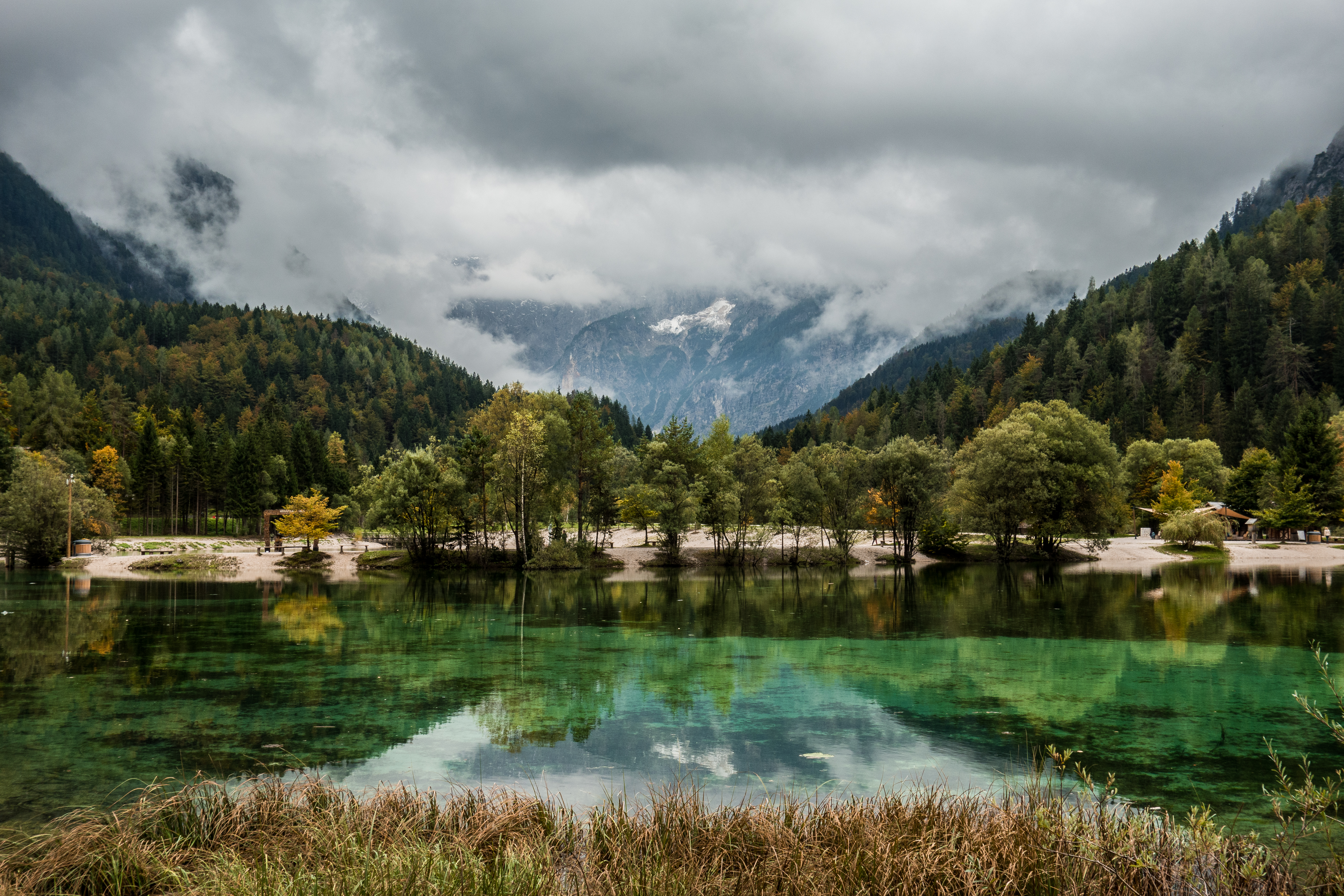

- Location within Slovenia
- Location: Upper Carniola, Slovenia
- Coordinates: 46°28′32″N 13°47′0″E
- Basin countries: Slovenia

Lake Jasna (Slovene: Jezero Jasna) is the name of two interconnected artificial lakes located near Kranjska Gora along the road to the Vršič Pass.

The lakes are arranged for the needs of tourism at the confluence of Mala and Velika Pišnica. At the confluence there is an even smaller natural canyon and a somewhat hidden Kranjska Gora Hydroelectric Power Plant.

There are walking paths around Jasna, and the forest path along the Mala Pišnica valley, which was abandoned after the earthquake in 1980, has its beginnings here. Next to the lake, in addition to the apartments, there is also a playground and a bronze statue of an Ibex on a natural rock, created between 1986 and 1988 by the sculptor Stojan Batič.
