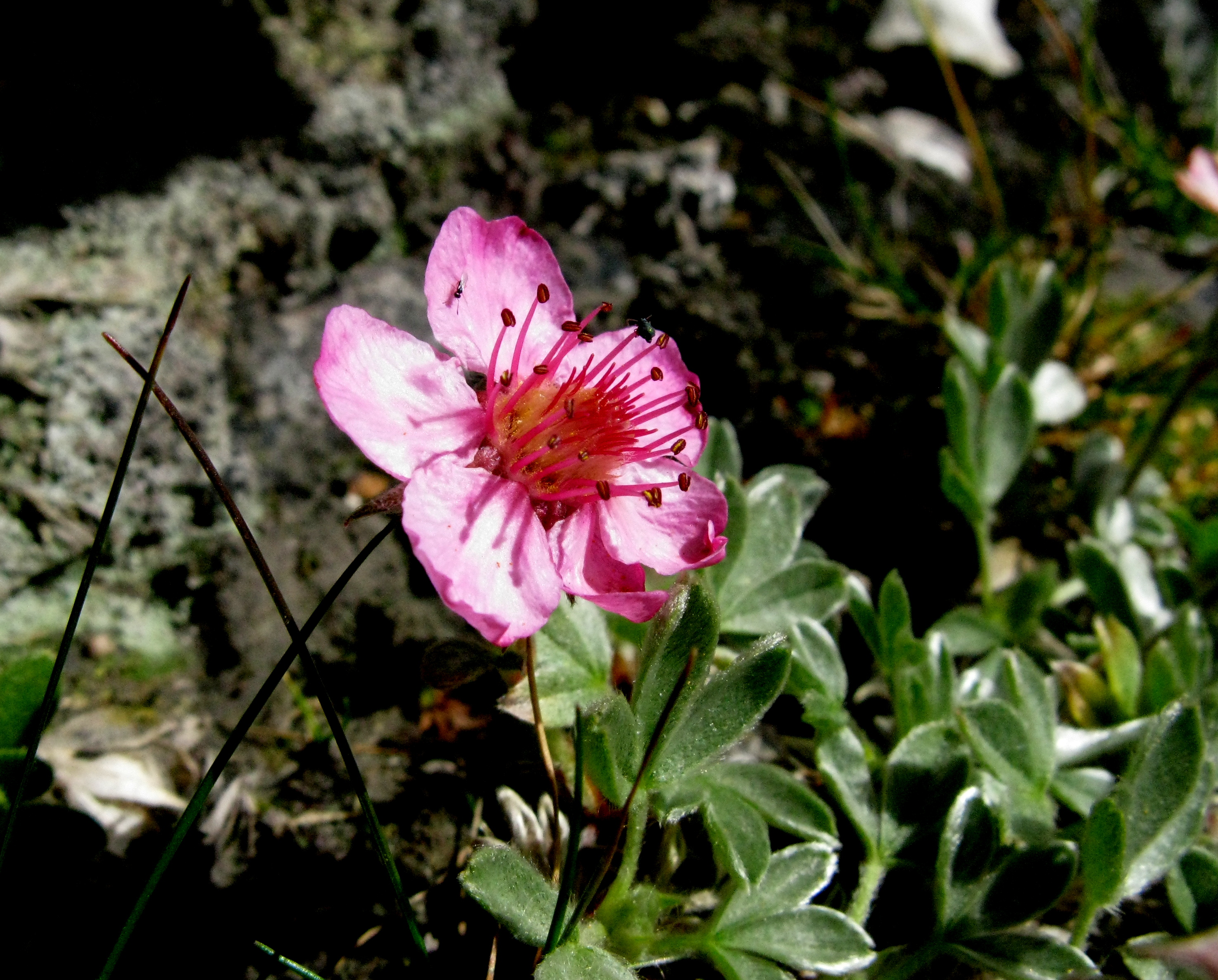

Scientific classification
- Kingdom: Plantae
- Clade: Tracheophytes
- Clade: Angiosperms
- Clade: Eudicots
- Clade: Rosids
- Order: Rosales
- Family: Rosaceae
- Genus: Potentilla
- Species: P. nitida

Binomial name
- Potentilla nitida L.

= Potentilla nitida =

Species of flowering plant

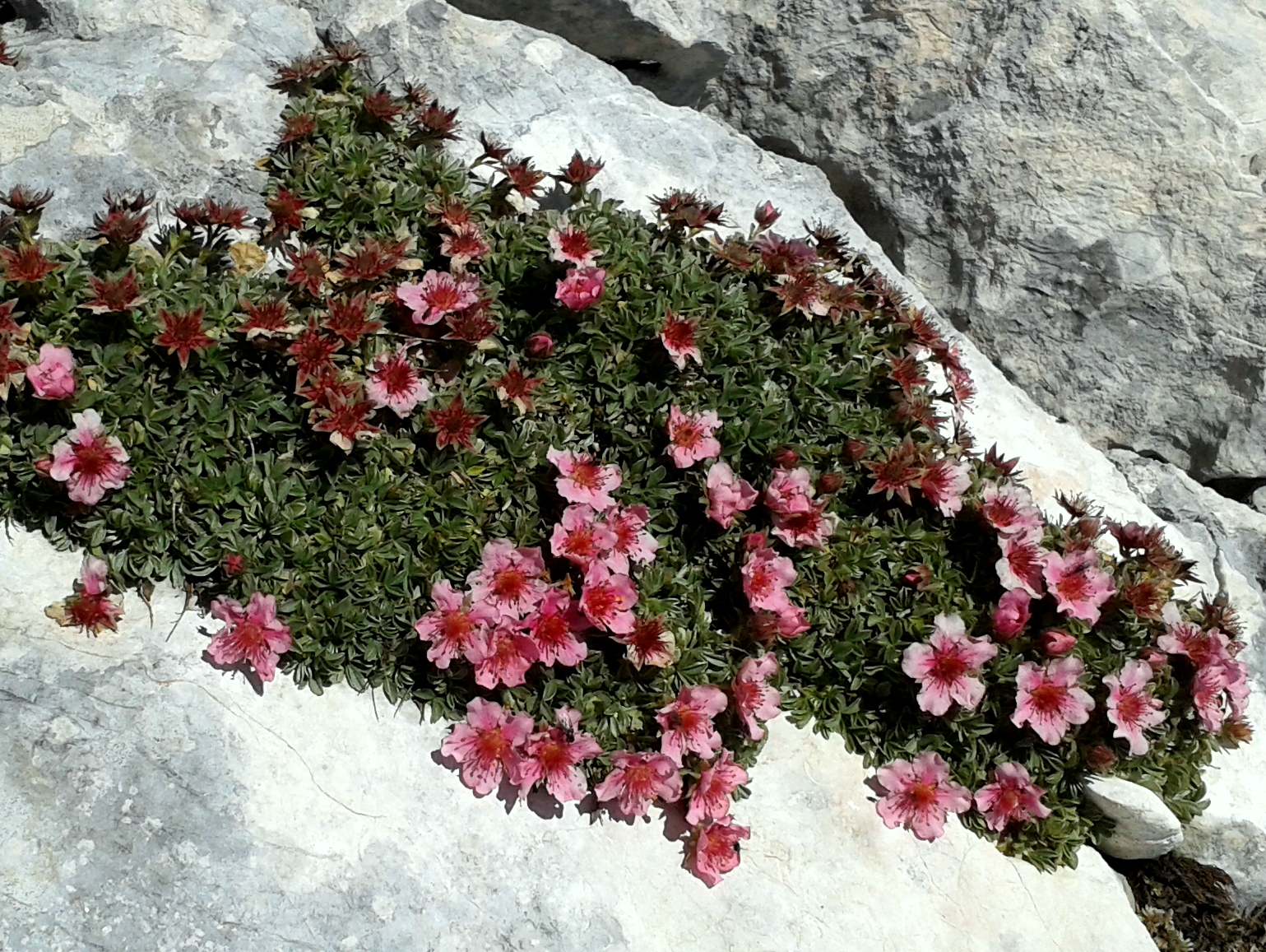
Potentilla nitida - Dolomites

Potentilla nitida, the pink cinquefoil, is a species of cinquefoil in the family Rosaceae that is endemic to the Alps where it grows on elevation of 3,200 metres (10,500 ft). The species is 5 centimetres (2.0 in) tall and 15–30 centimetres (5.9–11.8 in) wide. The flowers grow in pairs and are 2–2.5 centimetres (0.79–0.98 in) long.
