= Simon Robič =

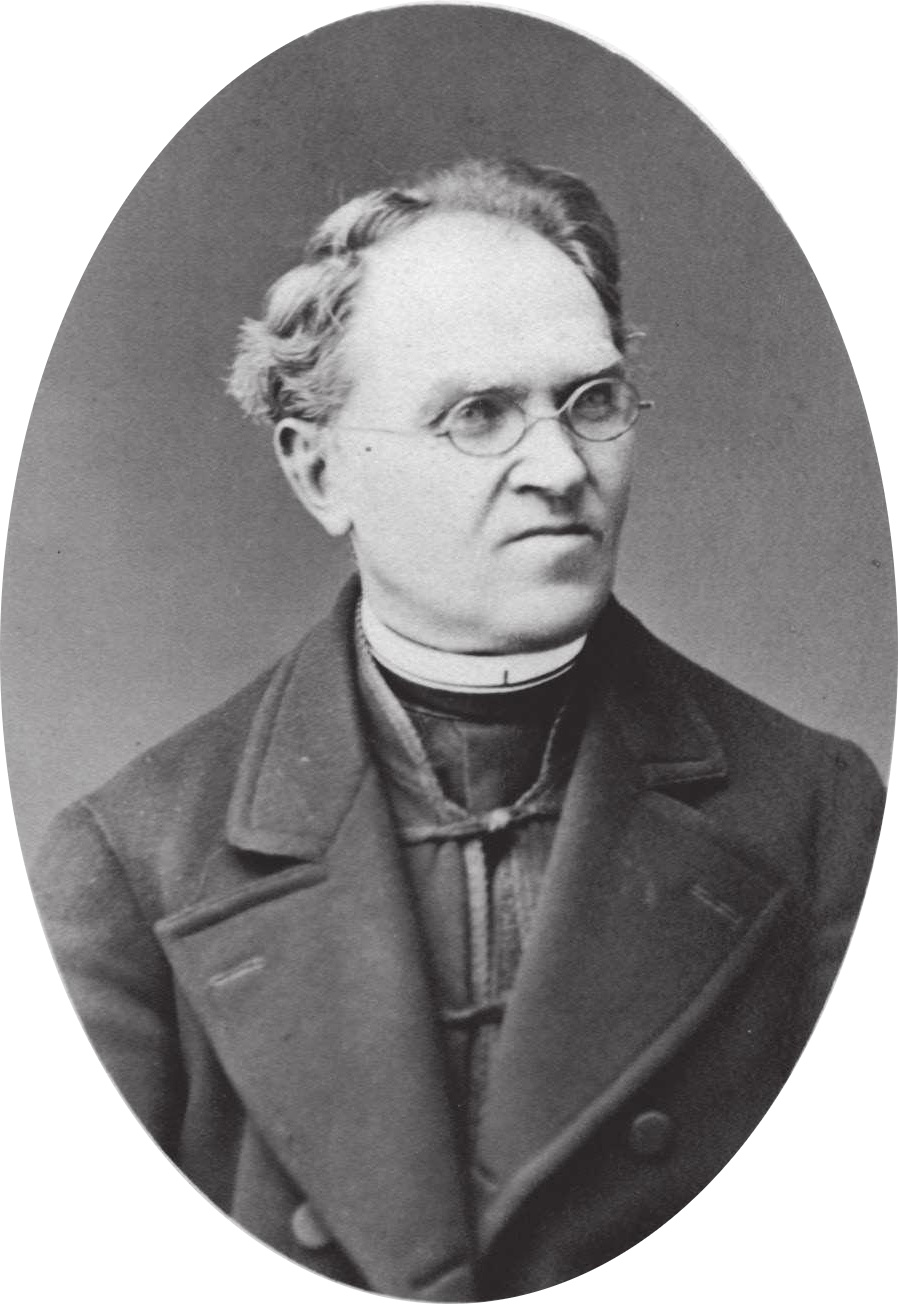
Simon Robič

Simon Robič (11 February 1824 – 7 March 1897) was a Slovenian priest and naturalist who contributed to studies on the botany, geology, and entomology of Slovenia. He was a writer of popular articles on geology and helped establish a mountaineering organization. His collections are held in the Natural History Museum in Ljubljana.

== Life and work ==
Robič (spelt as Rabič until 1865) was born in Kranjska Gora to farmers Jakob Robič and Helena Möntrel. He studied philosophy and theology and served as a chaplain in Metlika from 1851. He then lived in Dob (from 1856), Preddvor (from 1858), Borovnici (since 1862), Šenčur pri Kranju (from 1868) and Olševec (1870). From 1874, he was at Šenturska gora and lived there until his death. While studying at Gymnasium, he had been influenced by the botanist priest Franz Hladnik (1773–1844) and he later studied plants wherever he was posted. His herbarium and collections are held at the Museum of Natural History in Ljubljana. He also collected insects and totalling about 5600 specimens.

He died in Šenturška Gora.

The beetle species Ceuthmonocharis robici was named after him by Ludwig Ganglbauer in 1899. He also studied and collected molluscs, fossils and geological specimens. He examined caves where he discovered the skull of a cave bear which he had mistaken for that of a boar. About 19 bird skeletons were prepared by him which are held in the natural history museum.

A fossil dragonfly discovered in the Tunjice Hills was named in his honour in 2008 as Sloveniatrum robici.
