= Vršič Pass =

Mountain pass across the Julian Alps in Slovenia

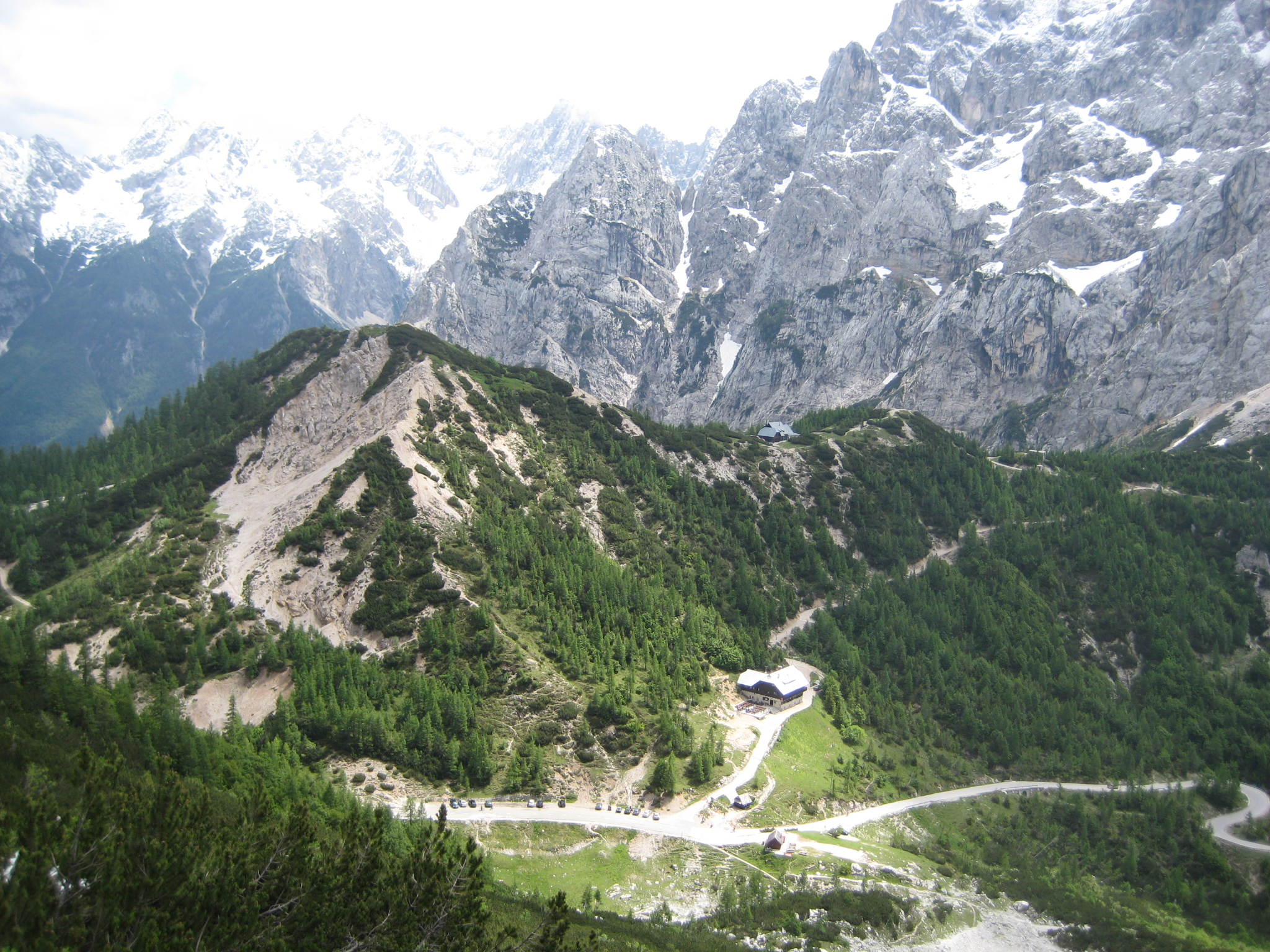
- The Vršič Pass

- Location within Alps
- Elevation: 1,611 m (5,285 ft)
- Traversed by: Ruska cesta

Third Approach
- Location: Upper Carniola, Slovenia
- Range: Julian Alps
- Coordinates: 46°26′8″N 13°44′40″E

The Vršič Pass (pronounced [ʋəɾˈʃitʃ]; Slovene: prelaz Vršič, Italian: passo della Moistrocca, German: Werschetzpass) is a high mountain pass across the Julian Alps in northwestern Slovenia. It is the highest pass in Slovenia, with an elevation of 1,611 metres (5,285 ft), as well as the highest in the Eastern Julian Alps. It connects Upper Carniola with the Trenta Valley in the Slovene Littoral, and it is considered an excellent starting point for excursions to surrounding peaks.

== Name ==
The Slovene common noun vršič literally means 'little peak', a diminutive form of the word vrh 'peak'. The name originally referred to Mount Vršič (1,738 m or 5,702 ft), located about 200 m (660 ft) east of the Vršič Pass. The name Vršič was not applied to the pass until 1911. The name of the peak was first attested in written sources as Werschez in 1763–87. Locally, the pass is known as Na močilu (first attested in 1763–87 as Muschizach or Mushizhach). The Italian name of the pass was Moistrocca.

== Geology ==
In its upper section, the Vršič Pass mostly consists of Anisian dolomite. Underneath, there are grey limestones, sandstones, mica-rich sandstones, and brownish sandy marls in the lowest layer, covered by an extensive stack of Triassic rock from the Ladinian to the Carnian. In the western part of the Vršič Pass, there is evidence of a main dislocation. The relief has been significantly eroded.

== Relief ==
The Vršič pass has a width of 1 kilometer. The ridge is about 850 metres long. There are erosion shelfs and small sinkholes.

== Vegetation ==
The predominant vegetation is beech forest mixing with larch. There are also creeping pines and rhododendron.

== History ==
Vršič had formerly been traversed by a rough trail, used for logging and timber transportation. During WWI, the Austro-Hungarian military upgraded the trail into a modern road; it is now known as the Russian Road (Ruska cesta), for the Russian prisoners of war forced to build it between 1915 and 1917.

From 1918 to World War II, the Vršič Pass marked the border between Italy and Yugoslavia. After 1945, together with the Upper Isonzo Valley north of Gorizia, both sides of the pass were incorporated into Yugoslavia, and later into Slovenia.

== Hiking ==
The Vršič Pass is considered an excellent starting point for excursions to surrounding peaks, including Mala Mojstrovka (2,332 m or 7,651 ft), Velika Mojstrovka (2,366 m or 7,762 ft), Planja (2,453 m or 8,048 ft), Prisojnik (Prisank) (2,547 m or 8,356 ft), Razor (2,601 m or 8,533 ft), Šitna Glava (2,087 m or 6,847 ft), Slemenova Špica (1,911 m or 6,270 ft), Sovna Glava (1,750 m or 5,740 ft), and Suhi Vrh (2,109 m or 6,919 ft), or shorter hikes in the immediate area.

Several mountain lodges are located near the pass: the Erjavec Lodge (Erjavčeva koča; 1,515 m or 4,970 ft), the Tičar Lodge (Tičarjev dom; 1,620 m or 5,310 ft), Mike's Lodge (Mihov dom), the Forest Lodge (Koča na Gozdu; 1,226 m or 4,022 ft), and the Postman's Lodge (Poštarska koča; 1,725 m or 5,659 ft).

== Road ==
The road through the pass rises from Kranjska Gora, traverses the top of the Vršič Pass, and descends into the Soča Valley, via a series of 50 hairpin bends. The upper elevations of the road are rendered impassable by heavy snowfall during much of winter. The road was greatly improved in late 1915 to supply the Isonzo Front of World War I, and it was originally named after Archduke Eugen of Austria-Hungary. The current name, Russian Road (Ruska cesta), refers to the approximately ten to twelve thousand Russian prisoners of war used as laborers in the 1915 construction.

== Monuments ==
Just off the main road, on the north side of the pass, at an elevation of around 1,200 m (3,900 ft), there is a Russian Orthodox chapel, built by Russian prisoners of war during World War I.

On the south side of the pass there is a bronze monument in honor of the mountaineer and writer Julius Kugy, a work by the architect Boris Kobe and the sculptor Jakob Savinšek. It was erected in 1953.

== Gallery ==
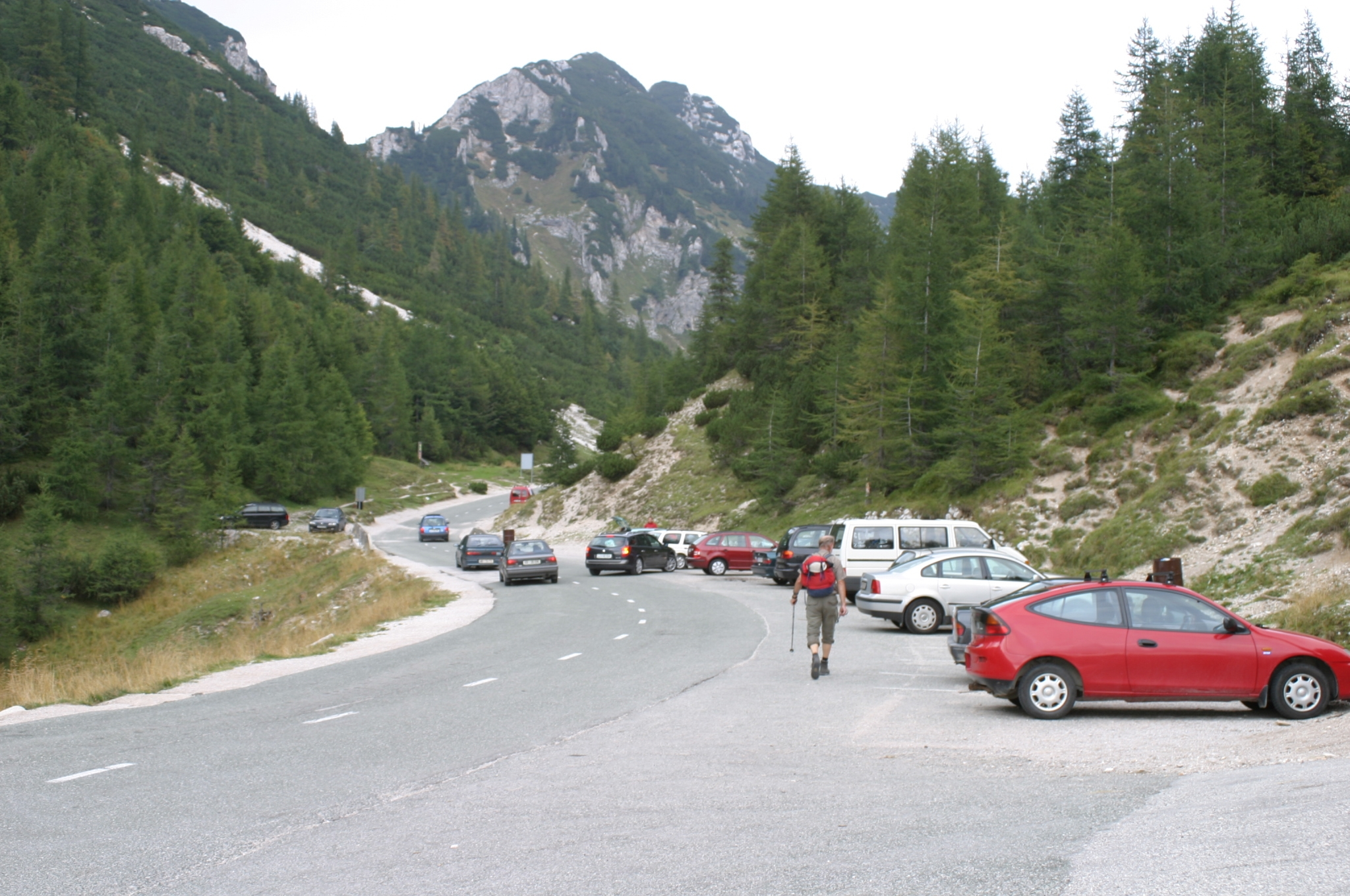
The Vršič Pass

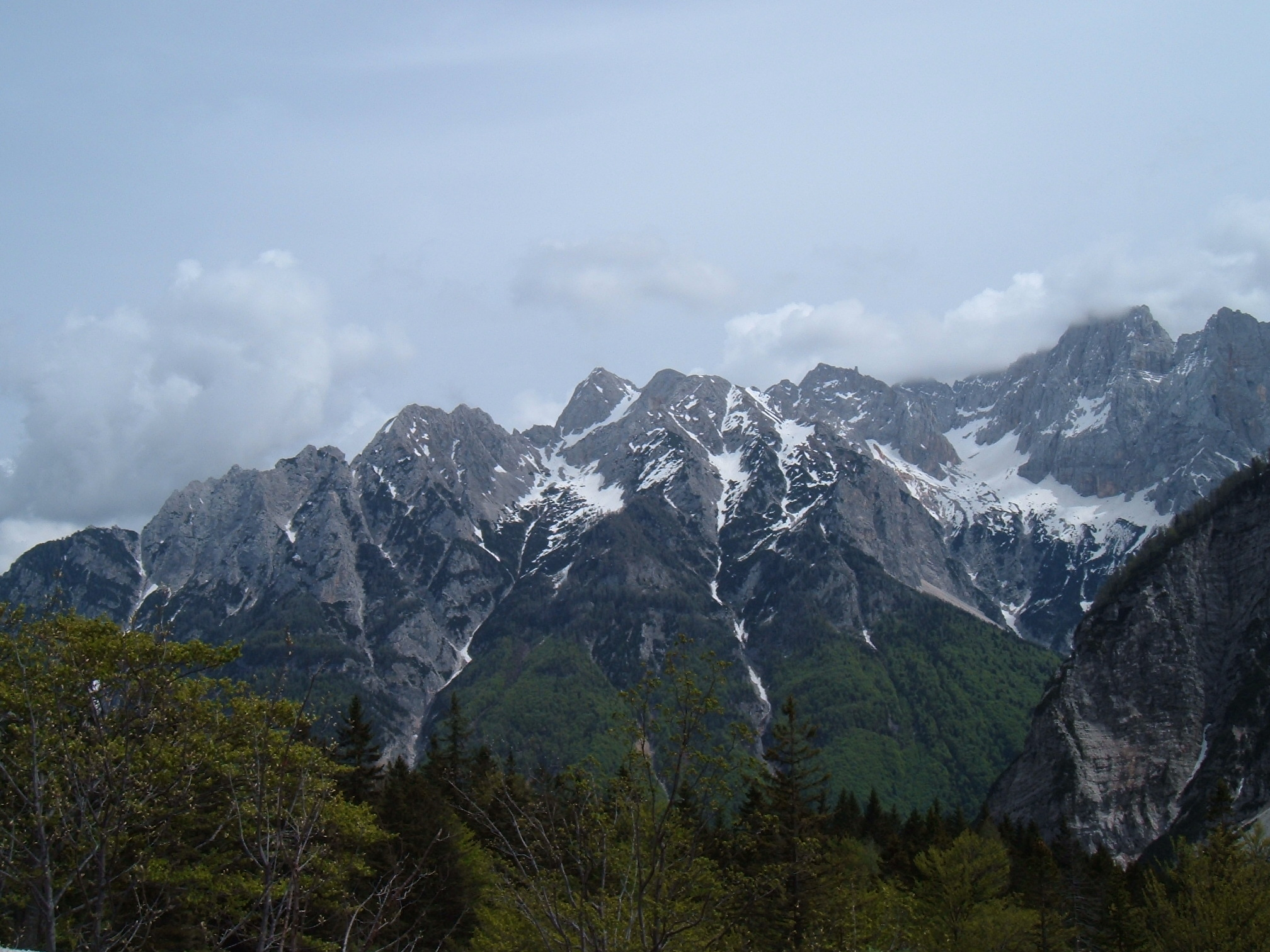
View from the Vršič Pass

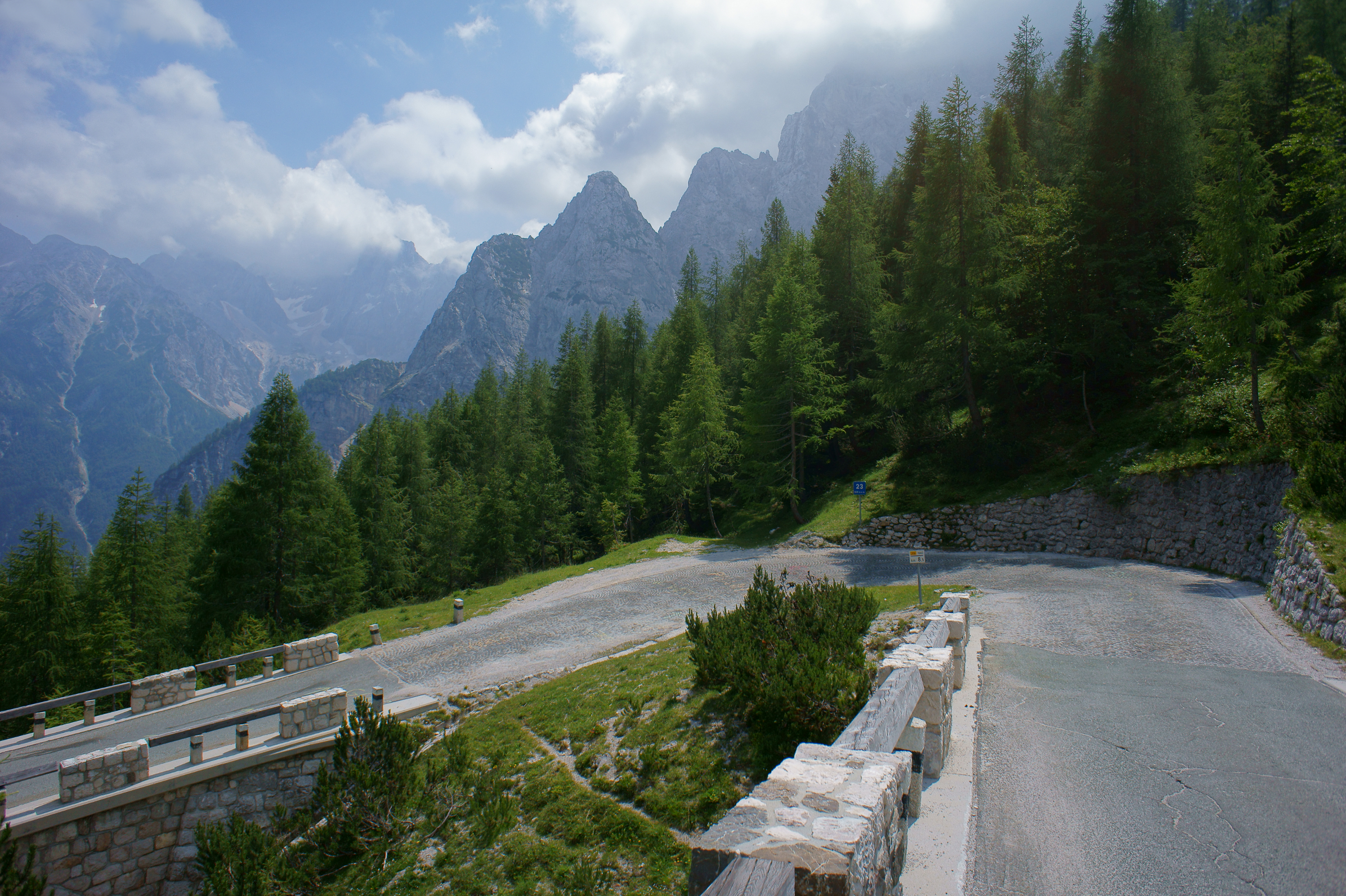
Ascending the road to the Vršič Pass, view of the 23rd switchback at 1,539 m above sea level

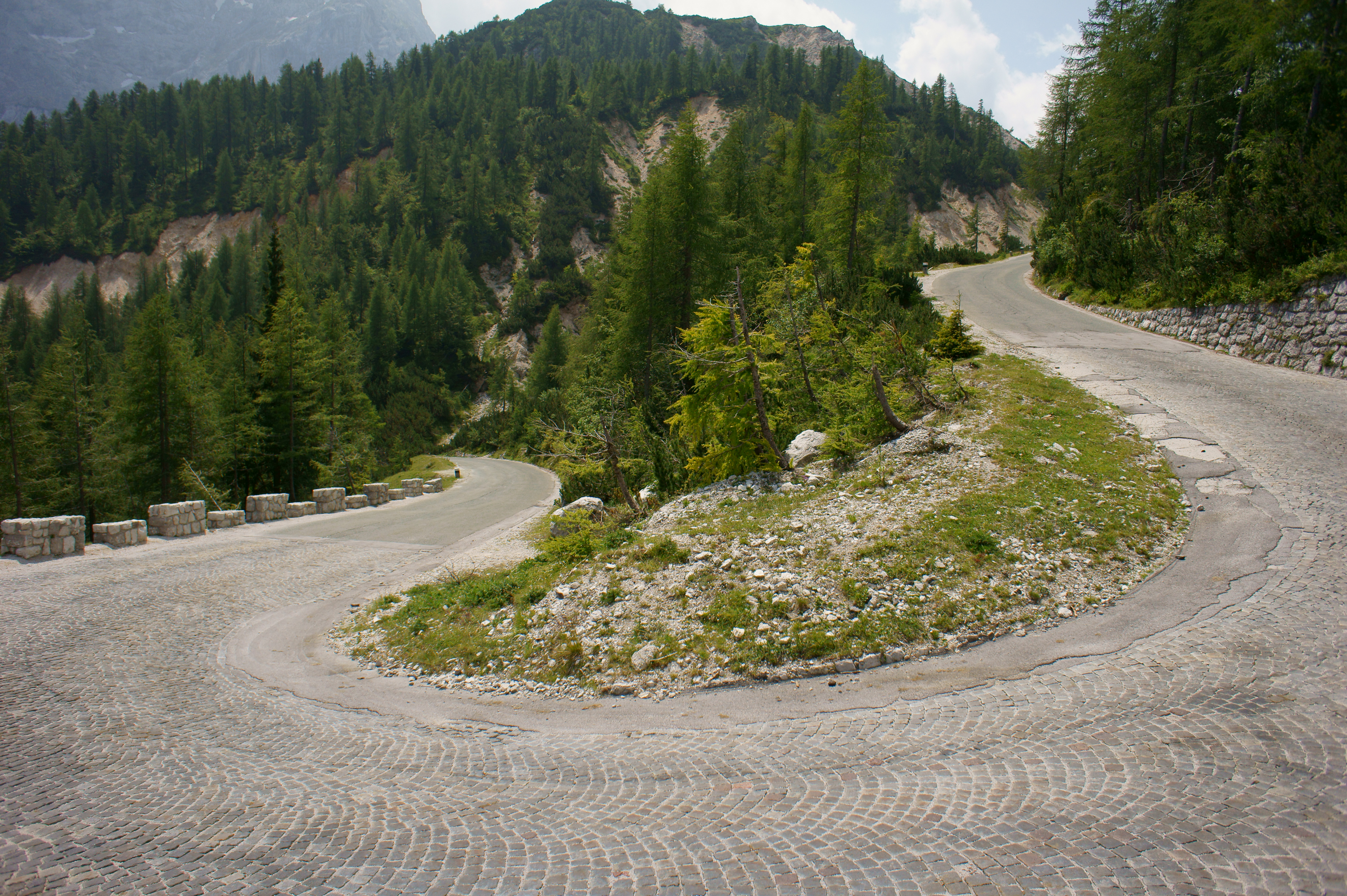
The Russian Road; the switchbacks are paved with setts

== See also ==
- List of highest paved roads in Europe
- List of mountain passes
