= Rudolf Baumbach =

German poet

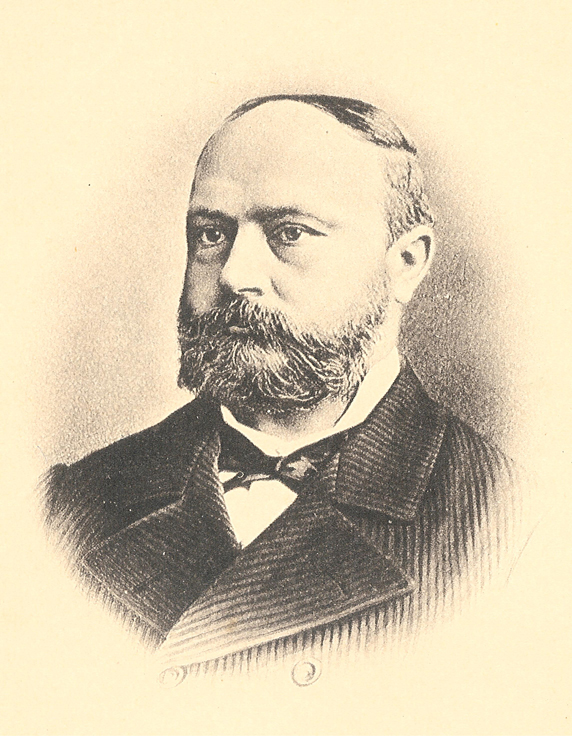
- Born: 28 September 1840; Kranichfeld, Saxe-Weimar-Eisenach
- Died: 21 September 1905 (aged 64); Meiningen
- Occupation: Poet

Rudolf Baumbach (28 September 1840 – 21 September 1905) was a German poet.

== Life ==
Born in Kranichfeld in Saxe-Weimar-Eisenach, the son of a local medical practitioner, he received his early schooling at the gymnasium of Meiningen, to which place his father had relocated. After studying natural science at Leipzig as a member of the German Student Corps Thuringia and in various other universities, he engaged as a private tutor, both independently and for families, in the Austrian towns of Graz, Brünn and Trieste.

In Trieste he published an Alpine legend, Zlatorog (1877), and songs of a journeyman apprentice, Lieder eines fahrenden Gesellen (1878), both of which had many editions. Their success decided him to embark upon a literary career. During 1885, he returned to Meiningen, where he received the title of Hofrat, and was appointed ducal librarian. He remained in Meiningen for the twenty years until his death on 14 of September 1905.

Baumbach was a poet of the informal vagabond school and wrote, in imitation of his more famous compatriot, Joseph Viktor von Scheffel, many drinking songs, among which Die Lindenwirtin ("The Linden Hostess") has endeared him to many German students. But his real strength was for narrative verse, especially when he had the opportunity of describing the scenery and life of his native Thuringia. Special mention may be made of Frau Holde (1881), Spielmannslieder (1882), Von der Landstraße (1882), Thüringer Lieder (1891) and his prose, Sommermärchen ("Summer legends", 1881).
