= Kranjska Gora =

Town in Upper Carniola, Slovenia

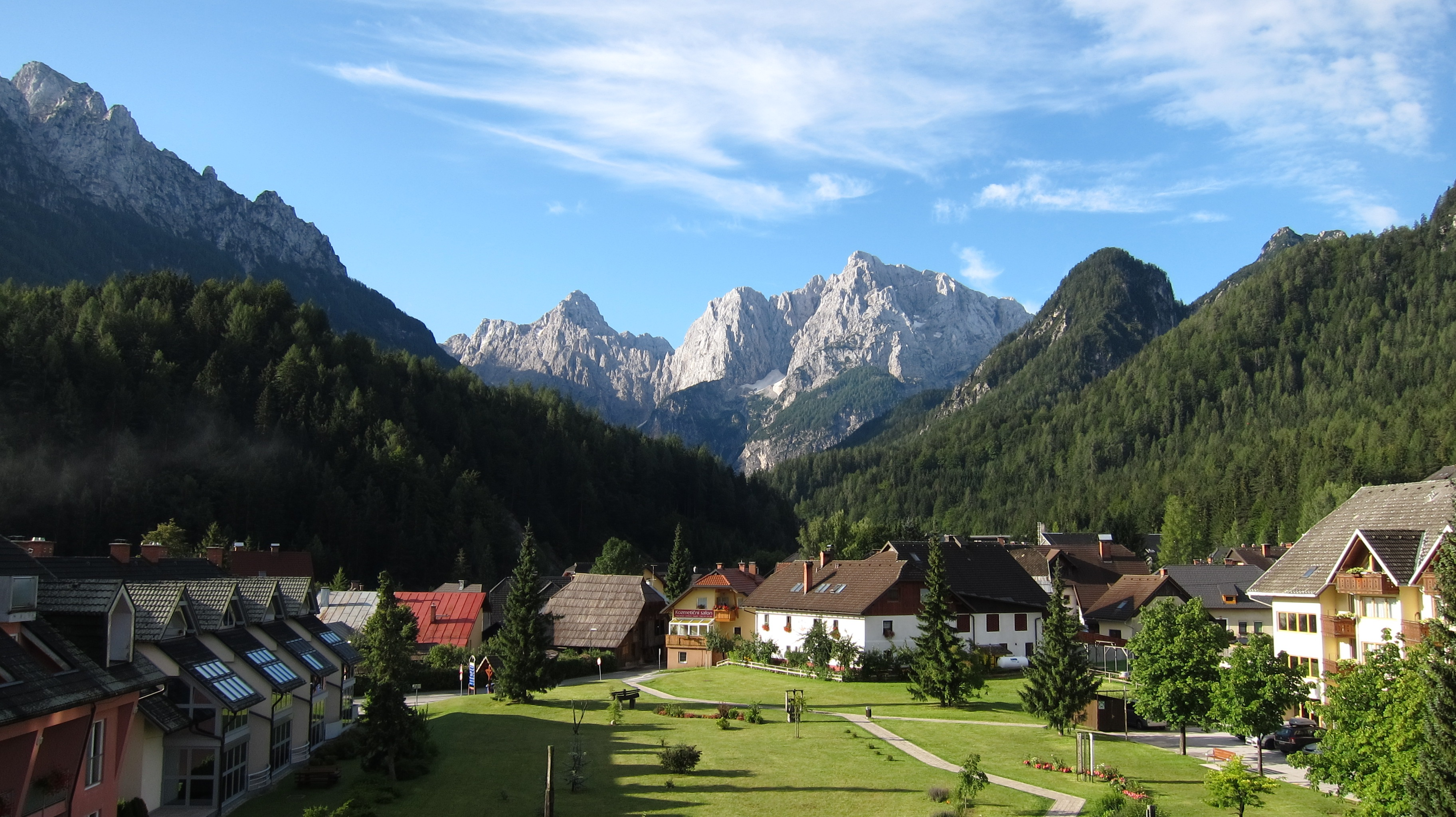

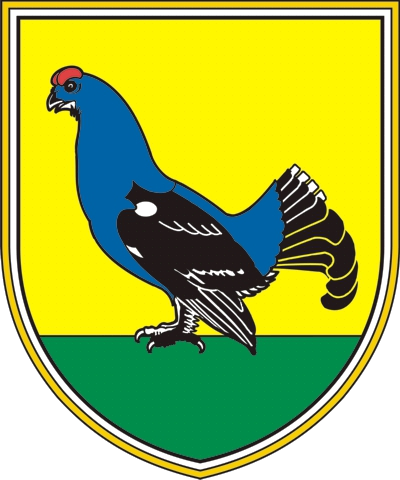
- Coat of arms

- Location in Slovenia
- Coordinates: 46°29′7.37″N 13°47′13.59″E
- Country: Slovenia
- Traditional region: Upper Carniola
- Statistical region: Upper Carniola
- Municipality: Kranjska Gora

Area
  - Total: 44.7 km^{2} (17.3 sq mi)
- Elevation: 806.3 m (2,645 ft)

Population (2025)
  - Total: 1,488

Location in the Alps

Kranjska Gora (Slovene: [ˈkɾàːnska ˈɡɔ̀ːɾa]; German: Kronau) is a town in northwestern Slovenia, on the Sava Dolinka River in the Upper Carniola region, close to the Austrian and Italian borders. It is the seat of the Municipality of Kranjska Gora. The tripoint between Austria, Italy and Slovenia lies on the mountain of Dreiländereck, known as Peč in Slovenia.

== Name ==
Kranjska Gora was first mentioned in written sources in 1326 as Chrainow (and as Chrainau and Chrainaw in 1363, as Cranaw and Chranaw in 1390, and as Kraynaw in 1456–61, among other names). The Slovene name Kranjska Gora is a reworking of the German name, influenced by German Krainberg 'Karawanks'. The settlement was also called Borovska vas (or Borovska ves or Borovška ves) in Slovene in the past.

== History ==
Kranjska Gora is believed to have been settled in the 11th century by Slovenes from Carantania. It was a fief of the Counts of Ortenburg in the 12th century. A trade route to Tarvisio already led through the town in the 14th century. In 1431 the Counts of Celje built a castle at Villa Bassa (now part of Tarvisio), which belonged to the town until 1848. Kranjska Gora came under Ottoman attack in 1476. A railroad connection was built to Kranjska Gora in 1870.

During the First World War, in 1916, Russian prisoners of war built a wooden chapel above the settlement commemorating their comrades killed in an avalanche while building a road over the Vršič Pass. There is a small cemetery nearby. Commemorations take place at the chapel every year.

=== Mass grave ===
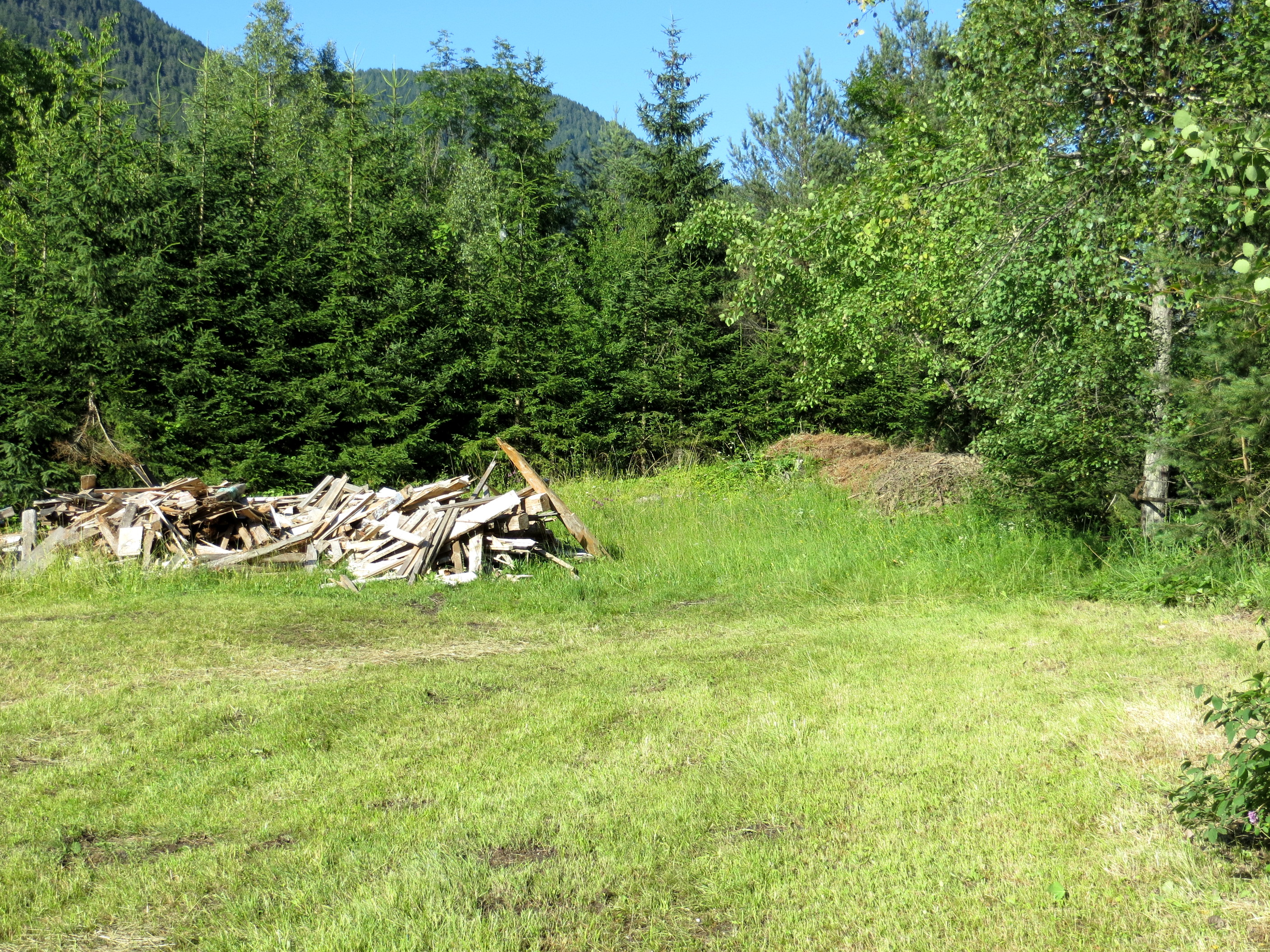
Mass grave site

A mass grave from the end of the Second World War is found in the eastern part of the town. The Savsko Naselje Mass Grave (Slovene: Grobišče v Savskem naselju), also known as the Rušar Meadow Mass Grave (Grobišče Rušarjev travnik), contains the remains of up to 35 German soldiers killed in an engagement with the Partisans in May 1945.

=== Postwar period ===
Tourism developed further in Kranjska Gora after the Second World War. Various ski lifts were built on Mount Vitranc west of the town in 1949, 1962, 1964, and 1965, and a freight cableway was installed in 1958.

== Church ==
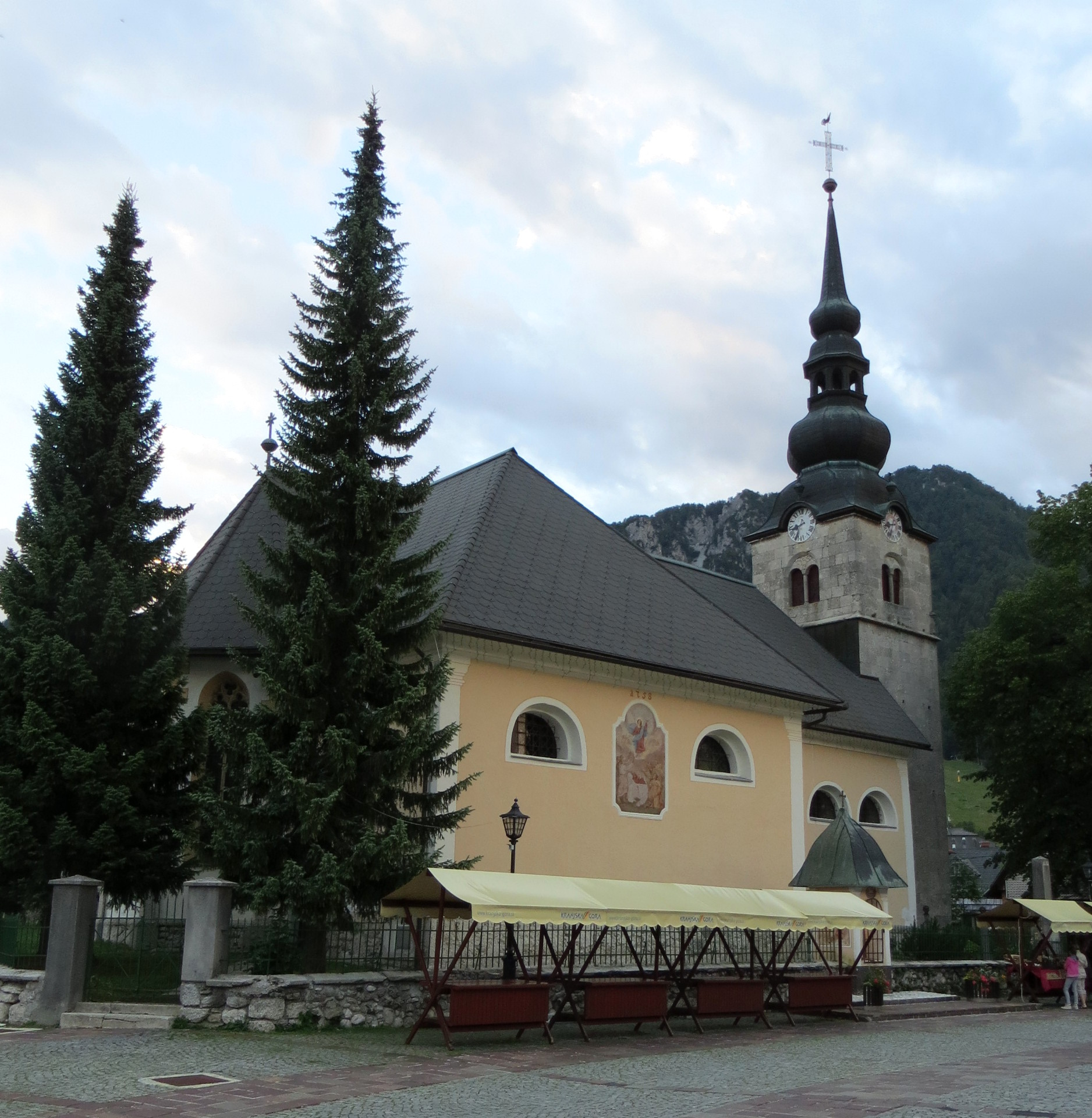
View from northeast

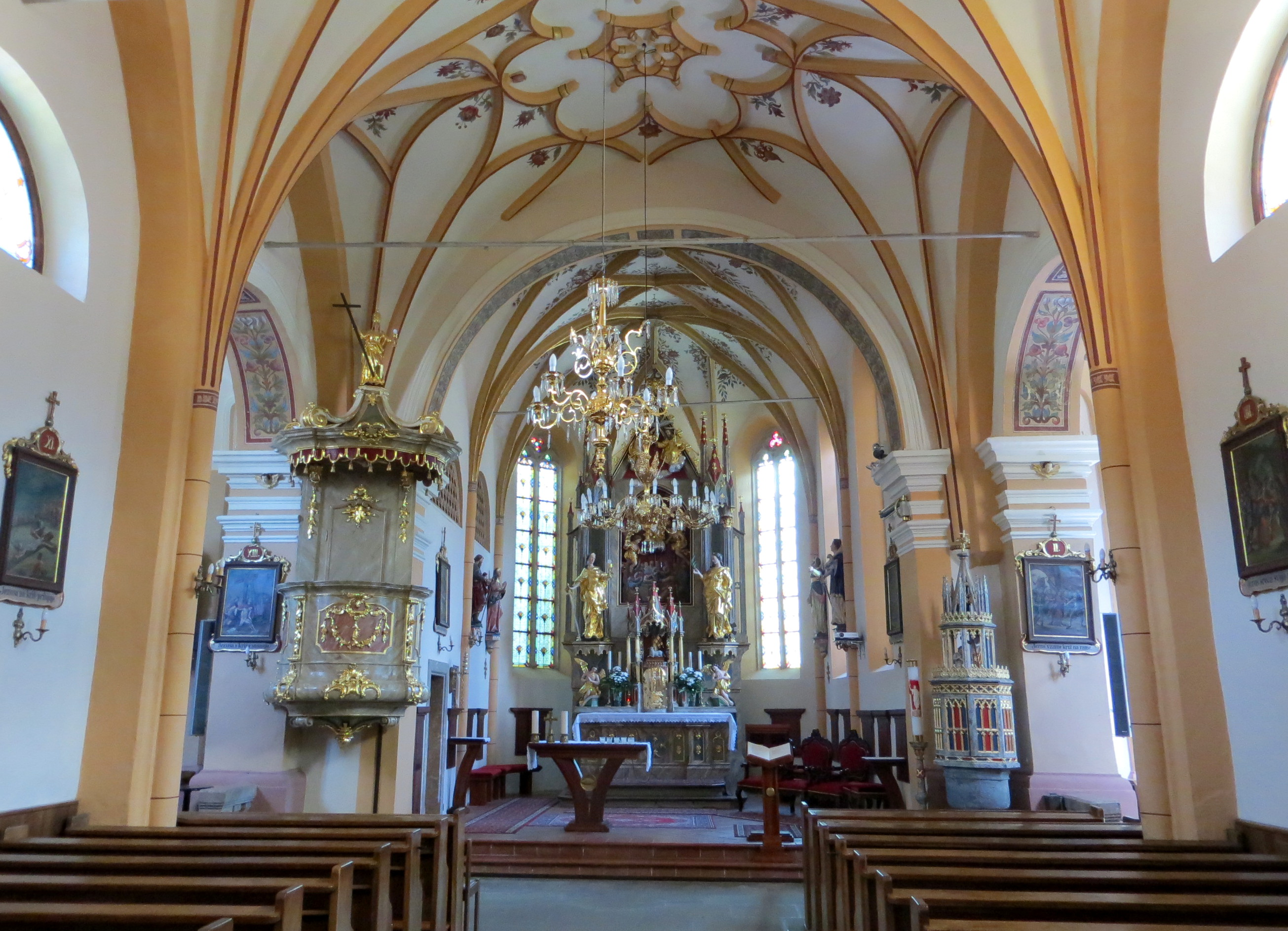
Interior

Assumption Church

The Counts of Ortenburg established a church dedicated to Our Lady on the White Gravel (Slovene: Marija na belem produ) in the 14th century, referring to the bank of the Pišnica River, which has since changed course. The current church, dedicated to the Assumption of Mary, is late Gothic in style and has typical Carinthian rib vaulting. It contains two sculptures from the second half of the 15th century and paintings by Leopold Layer (1752–1828).

== Recreation ==
Kranjska Gora is best known as a winter sports town, being situated in the Julian Alps. It annually hosts an event in the FIS Alpine Ski World Cup series, also known as the Vitranc Cup, for the slalom and giant slalom events. The well-known ski jumping hill Planica is located in the nearby Tamar Valley.

== Sports ==
Ice hockey club HK Kranjska Gora was founded in 1961. It represented Kranjska Gora in the Yugoslav Ice Hockey League and later Slovenian Hockey League for many years until it folded in 2006. Anže Kopitar, a long-time member and captain for the Los Angeles Kings of the National Hockey League (NHL), played for the club early in his career.

== Notable people ==
Notable people that were born or lived in Kranjska Gora include:

- Franjo Kogoj (1894–1983), dermatologist
- Josip Lavtižar (1851–1943), storyteller and local historian
- Janez Mencinger (1819–1909), writer
- Simon Robič (1824–1897), natural scientist
- Janez Smolej (1873–1938), translator and journalist
- Josip Vandot (1884–1944), children's writer

== Twin towns – sister cities ==
- Waasmunster, Belgium
- Santa Marinella, Italy

== Gallery ==
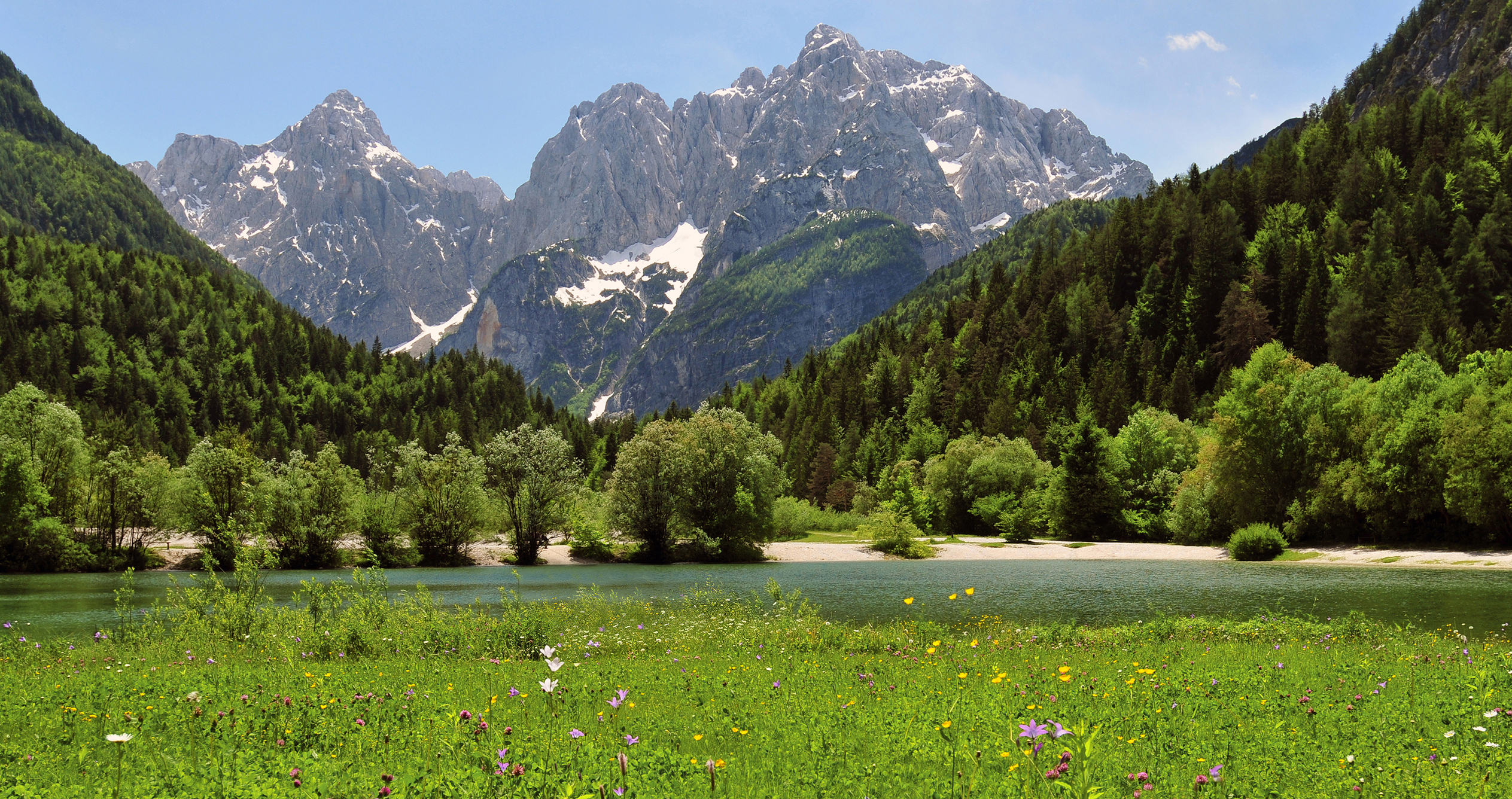
View from Kranjska Gora

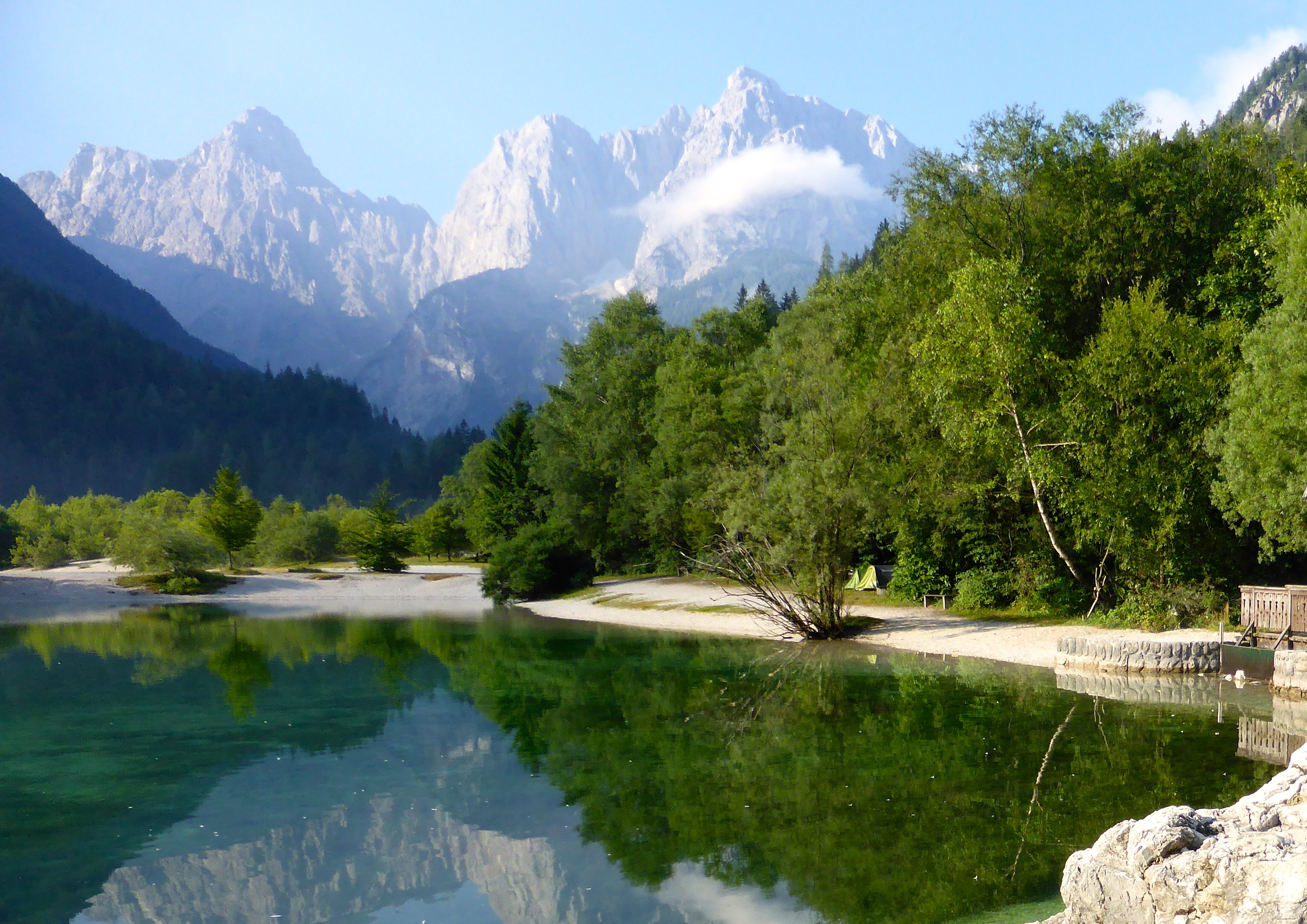
Lake Jasna at Kranjska Gora

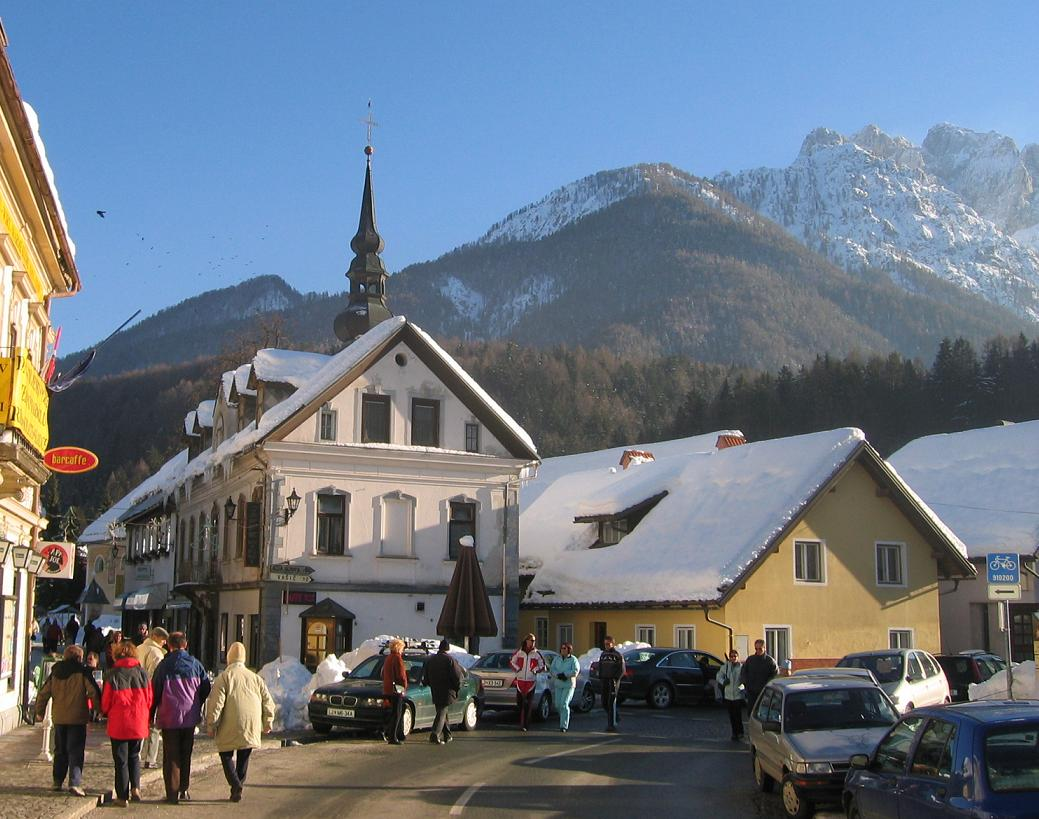
Main street

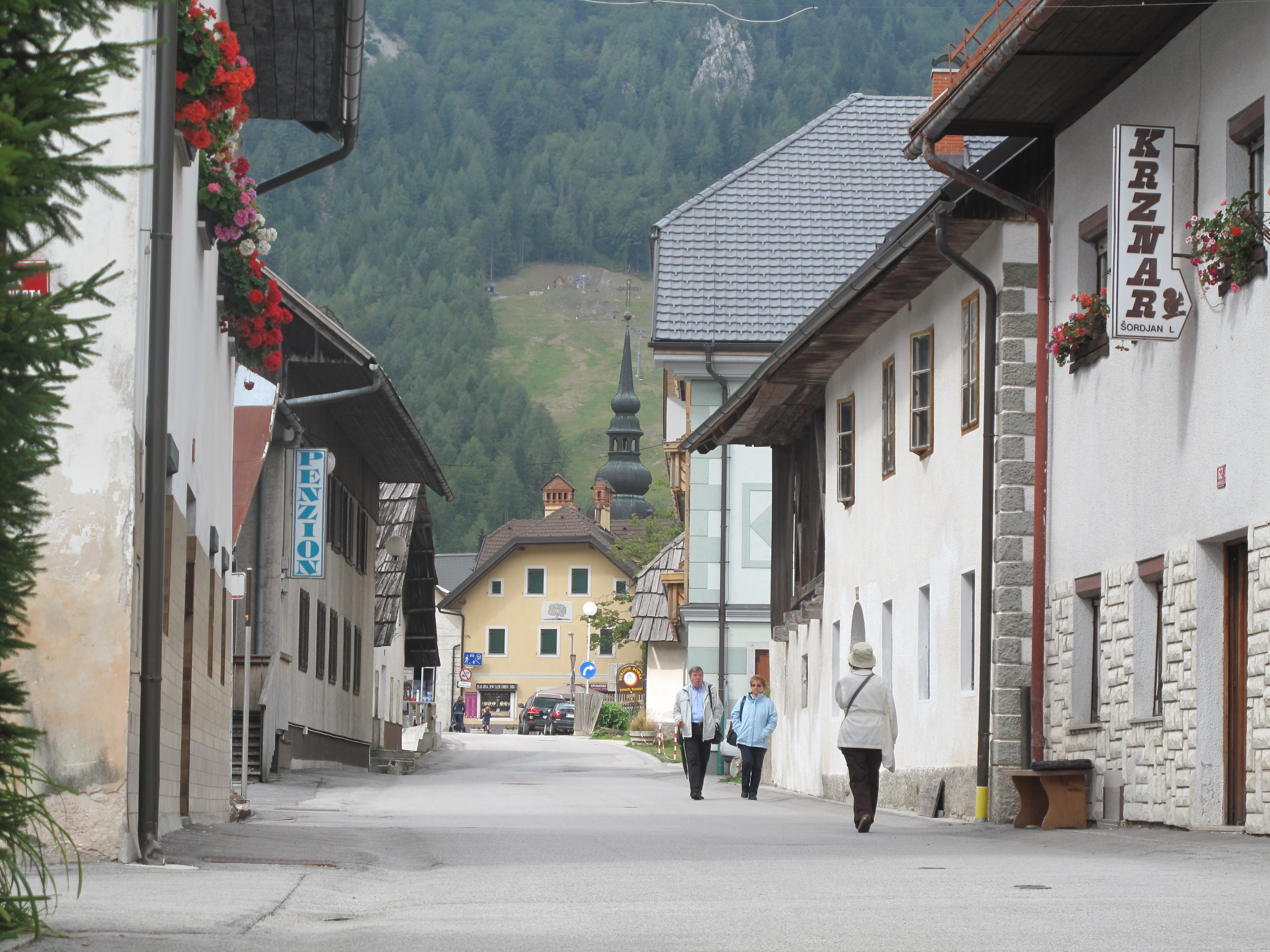
Street scene

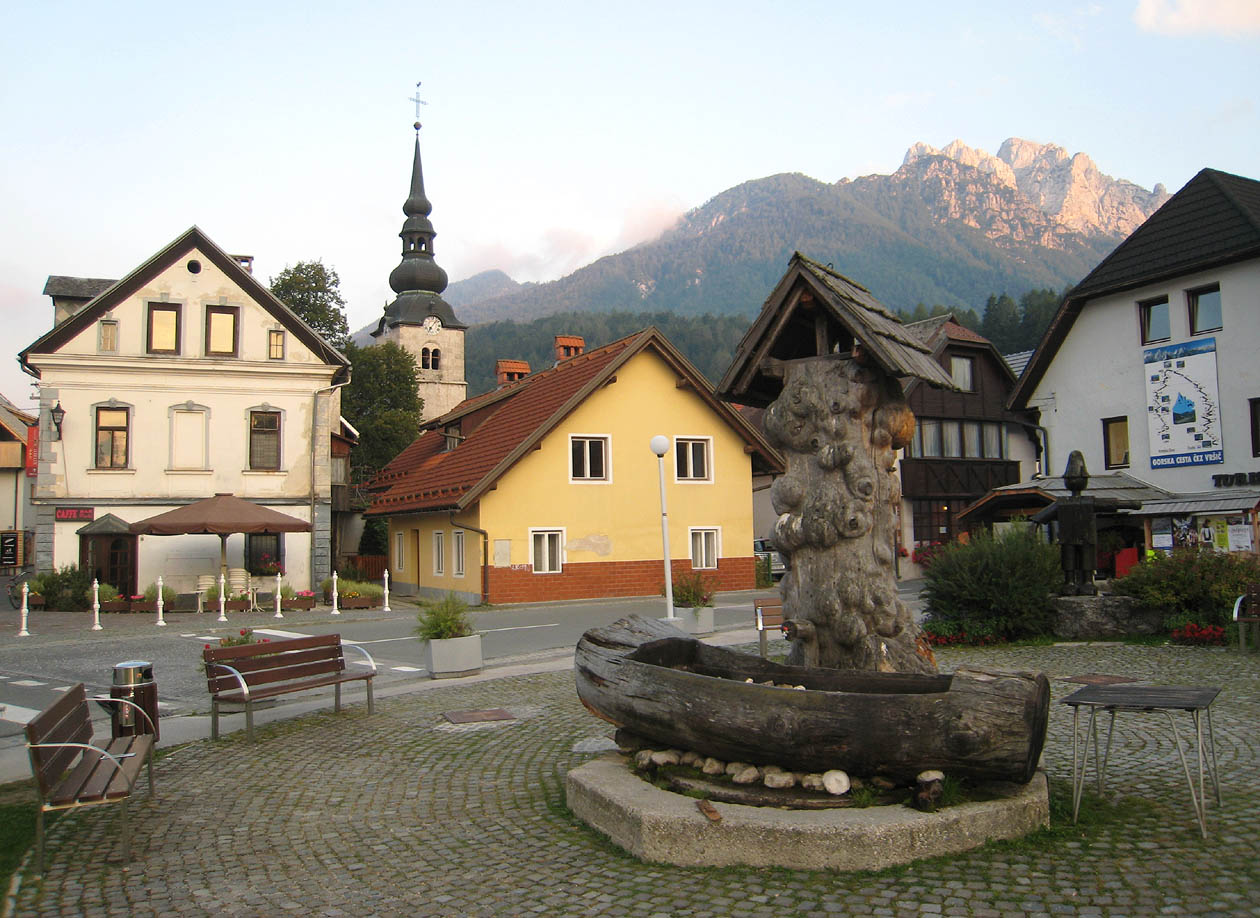
Fountain

== See also ==
- Kranjska Gora Ski Resort
