= Savica =

Savica may refer to:

- Savica, Bohinj, a settlement in northwestern Slovenia
- Savica, Zagreb, a neighbourhood of Zagreb, Croatia
- Savica River, in northwestern Slovenia
  - Savica (waterfall), a waterfall on the river
- Savica Mrkić (born 1991), Macedonian handball player

== See also ==
- Savić, a surname
- Savita (disambiguation)
