= Log v Bohinju =

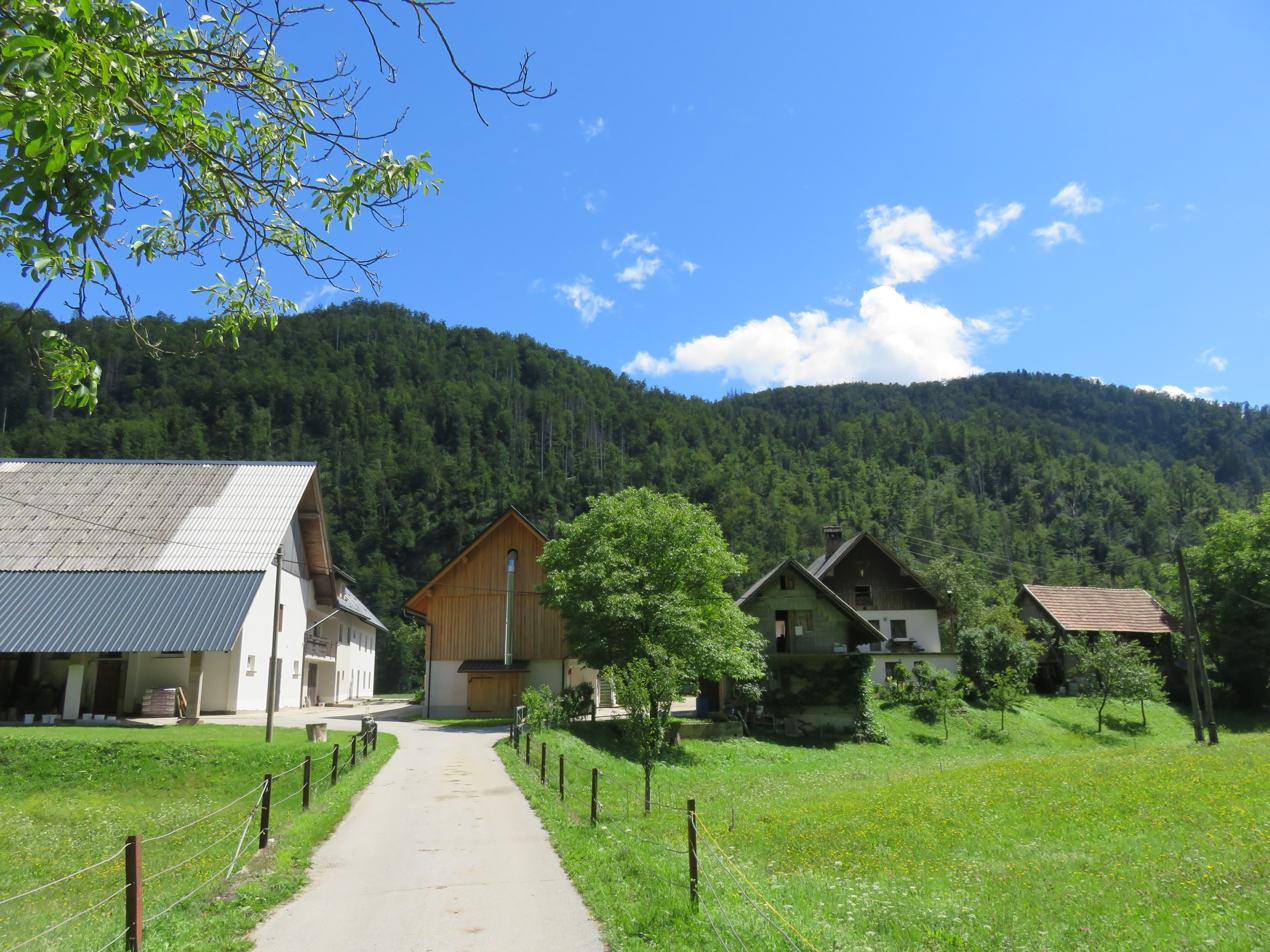

- Location in Slovenia
- Coordinates: 46°17′12.48″N 13°58′47.29″E
- Country: Slovenia
- Traditional region: Upper Carniola
- Statistical region: Upper Carniola
- Municipality: Bohinj
- Elevation: 493.4 m (1,619 ft)

Population (2020)
  - Total: 12

Log v Bohinju (pronounced [ˈlóːk w bɔˈxíːnju]) is a small settlement on the right bank of the Sava Bohinjka River in the Municipality of Bohinj in the Upper Carniola region of Slovenia.

== Geography ==
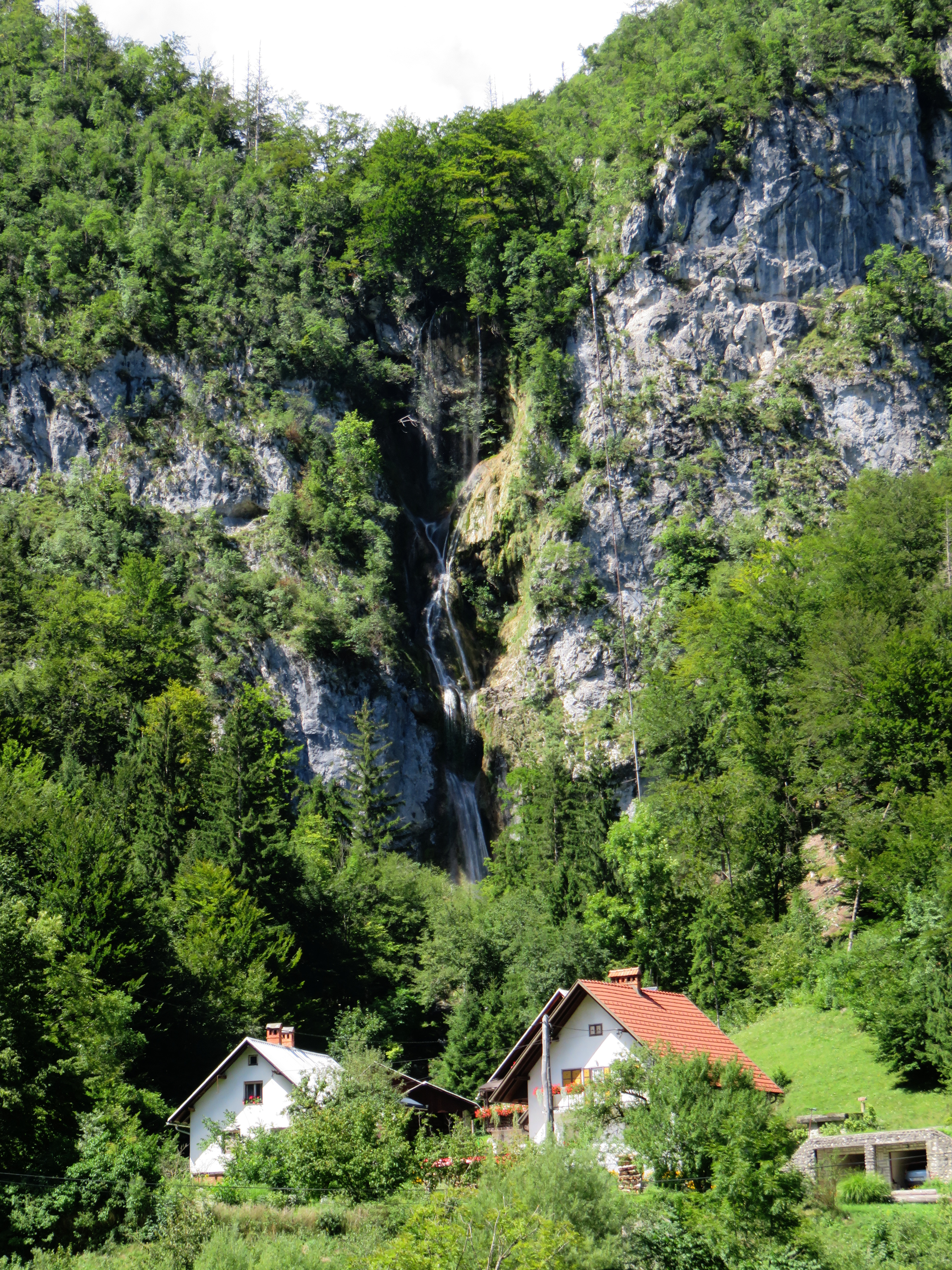
Pirašica Falls

Pirašica Falls (Slovene: Pirašiški slap, also slap Peračica and locally Pérošca) is located in the northwest part of Log v Bohinju. It is 102 meters (335 ft) high, and it is formed as the Pirašica River tumbles over a cliff southeast of Jereka in three stages.

== History ==
Log v Bohinju was part of the village of Lepence until 1997, when it was made a village in its own right.
