= Ukanc =

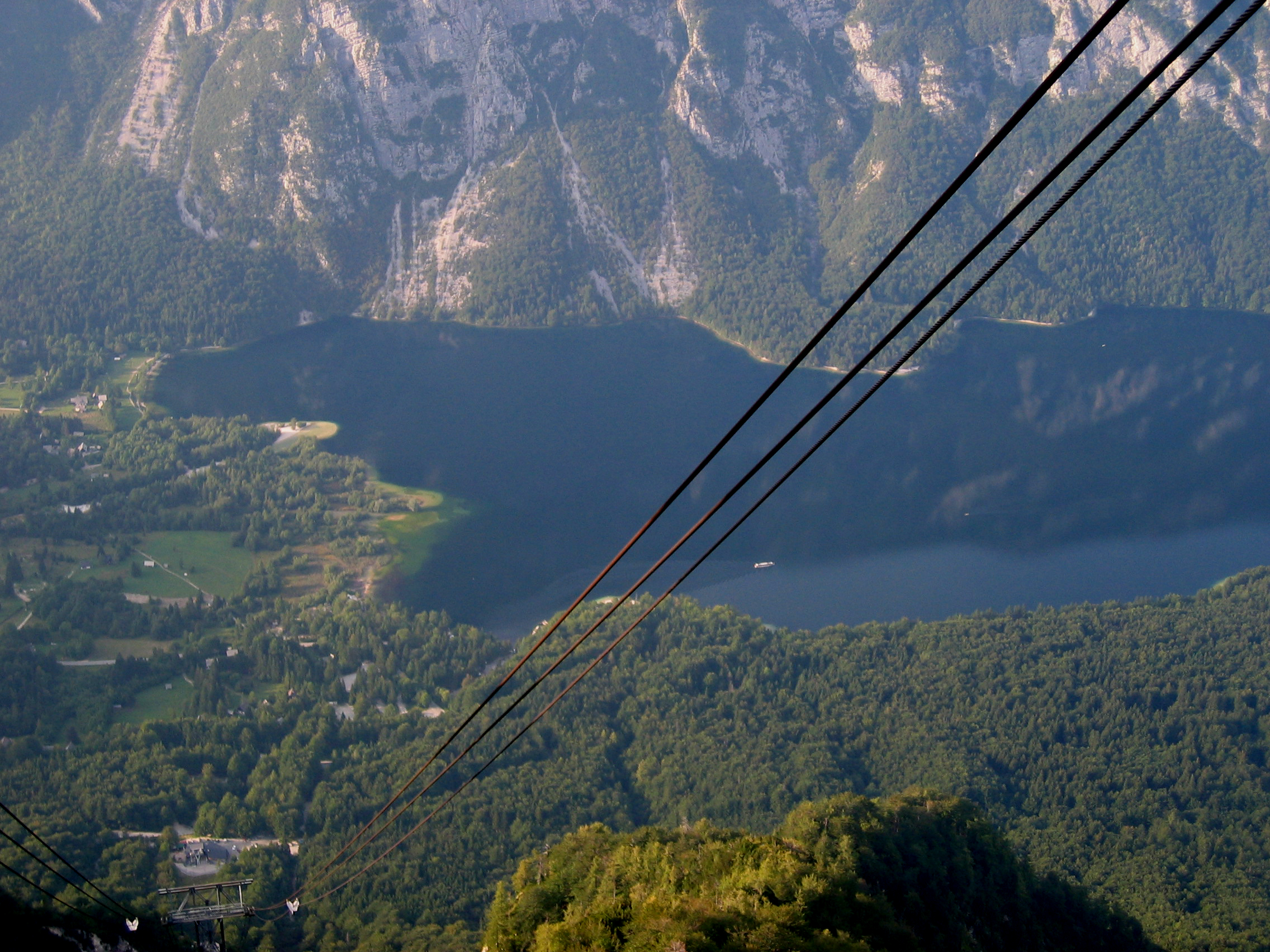

- Location in Slovenia
- Coordinates: 46°16′37.83″N 13°49′45.6″E
- Country: Slovenia
- Traditional region: Upper Carniola
- Statistical region: Upper Carniola
- Municipality: Bohinj
- Elevation: 546.2 m (1,792 ft)

Population (2020)
  - Total: 45

Ukanc (pronounced [ˈuːkants]) is a settlement near Lake Bohinj in the Municipality of Bohinj in the Upper Carniola region of Slovenia. It is southwest of the lake. The majority of buildings in the settlement are either hotels or holiday houses.

== Geography ==
Ukanc is a scattered settlement on a shady rolling plain at the west end of Lake Bohinj at the end of the valley, where mountain walls rise on three sides, closed in by Mount Vogel (1,922 meters or 6,306 feet), Little Peak (Mali vrh, 1,642 meters or 5,387 feet), Mount Peršivec (1,761 meters or 5,778 feet), and Komarča Cliff (1,457 meters or 4,780 feet). It is connected by road to Bohinjska Bistrica. The soil largely consists of alluvium from the Ukanc Suha River (Ukanška Suha) and Žagar Gorge (Žagarjev graben), as well as the Savica River. In meteorological terms, Ukanc is one of the wettest places in Slovenia.

== Name ==
Ukanc was attested in written sources in 1498 under various names: Vkanes, Vkentzi, Vkantzich, Nakonczi, Vkonczich, and Vkansczich. The name is a fused dialect form of the prepositional phrase v konec 'to/at the end', referring to its location at the end of the Bohinj Basin.

== Cemetery ==
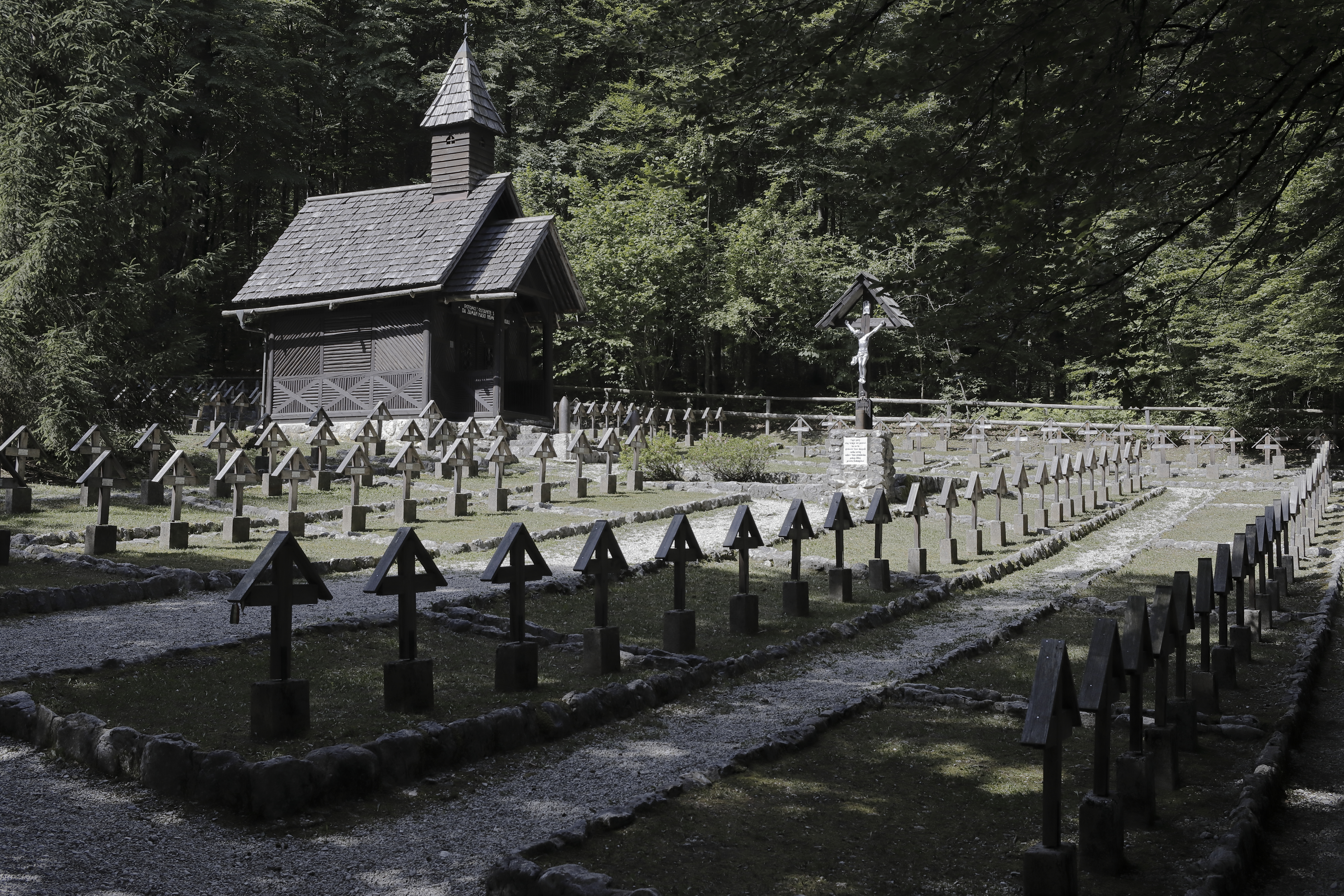
Ukanc Military Cemetery

An Austro-Hungarian cemetery with a wooden chapel is in Ukanc, near the former Isonzo front of the First World War.

== Mass grave ==
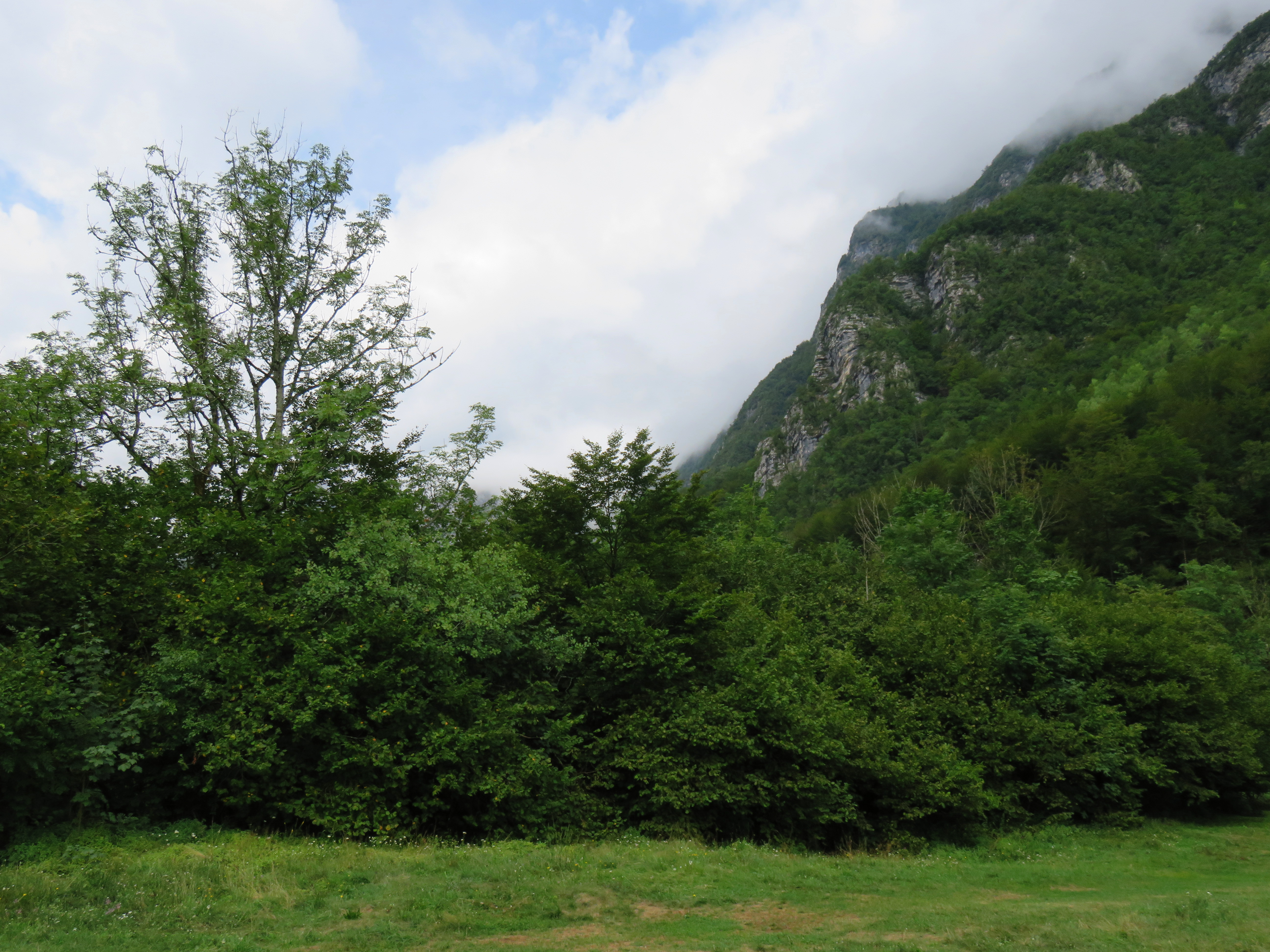
Ukanc Mass Grave site

Ukanc is the site of a former mass grave associated with the Second World War. The Ukanc Mass Grave (Slovene: Pri Ukancu) was located on the west shore of Lake Bohinj. It contained the remains of Croatian victims and has been exhumed.
