= Soteska, Bled =

Soteska
- Location in Slovenia
- Coordinates: 46°19′6″N 14°03′48″E
- Country: Slovenia
- Traditional Region: Upper Carniola
- Statistical region: Upper Carniola
- Municipality: Bled
- Elevation: 470 m (1,540 ft)

Soteska (pronounced [sɔˈteːska], in older sources sometimes V Štengah, German: In der Stiege) is a former settlement in the Municipality of Bled in northwestern Slovenia. It is now part of the village of Kupljenik. The Soteska railway station is in the neighboring village of Nomenj. The area is part of the traditional region of Upper Carniola and is now included with the rest of the municipality in the Upper Carniola Statistical Region.

== Geography ==
Soteska lies in the southwesternmost part of Kupljenik, on the right bank of the Sava Bohinjka River.

== History ==
Soteska was annexed by Kupljenik in 1955, ending its existence as a separate settlement.
