= Lepence =

Lepence Lepence-Log (until 1953)
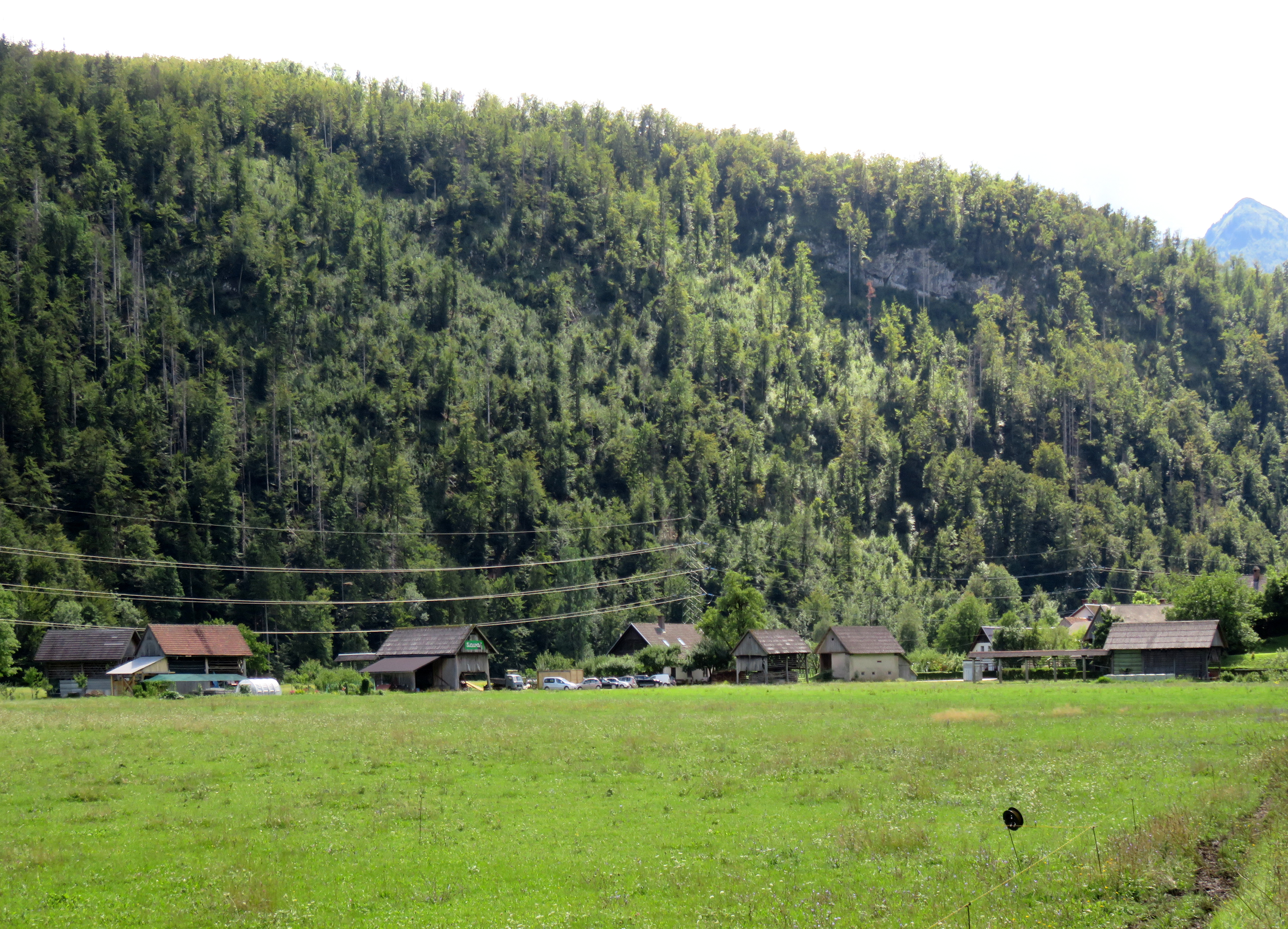

- Location in Slovenia
- Coordinates: 46°16′51.14″N 13°58′14.99″E
- Country: Slovenia
- Traditional region: Upper Carniola
- Statistical region: Upper Carniola
- Municipality: Bohinj
- Elevation: 499 m (1,637 ft)

Population (2020)
  - Total: 33

Lepence (pronounced [lɛˈpeːntsɛ]) is a settlement on the left bank of the Sava Bohinjka River in the Municipality of Bohinj in the Upper Carniola region of Slovenia.

== Name ==
The name of the settlement was changed from Lepence-Log to Lepence in 1953.

== History ==
The neighboring village of Log v Bohinju was part of Lepence until 1997, when it was made a village in its own right.
