= Laški Rovt =

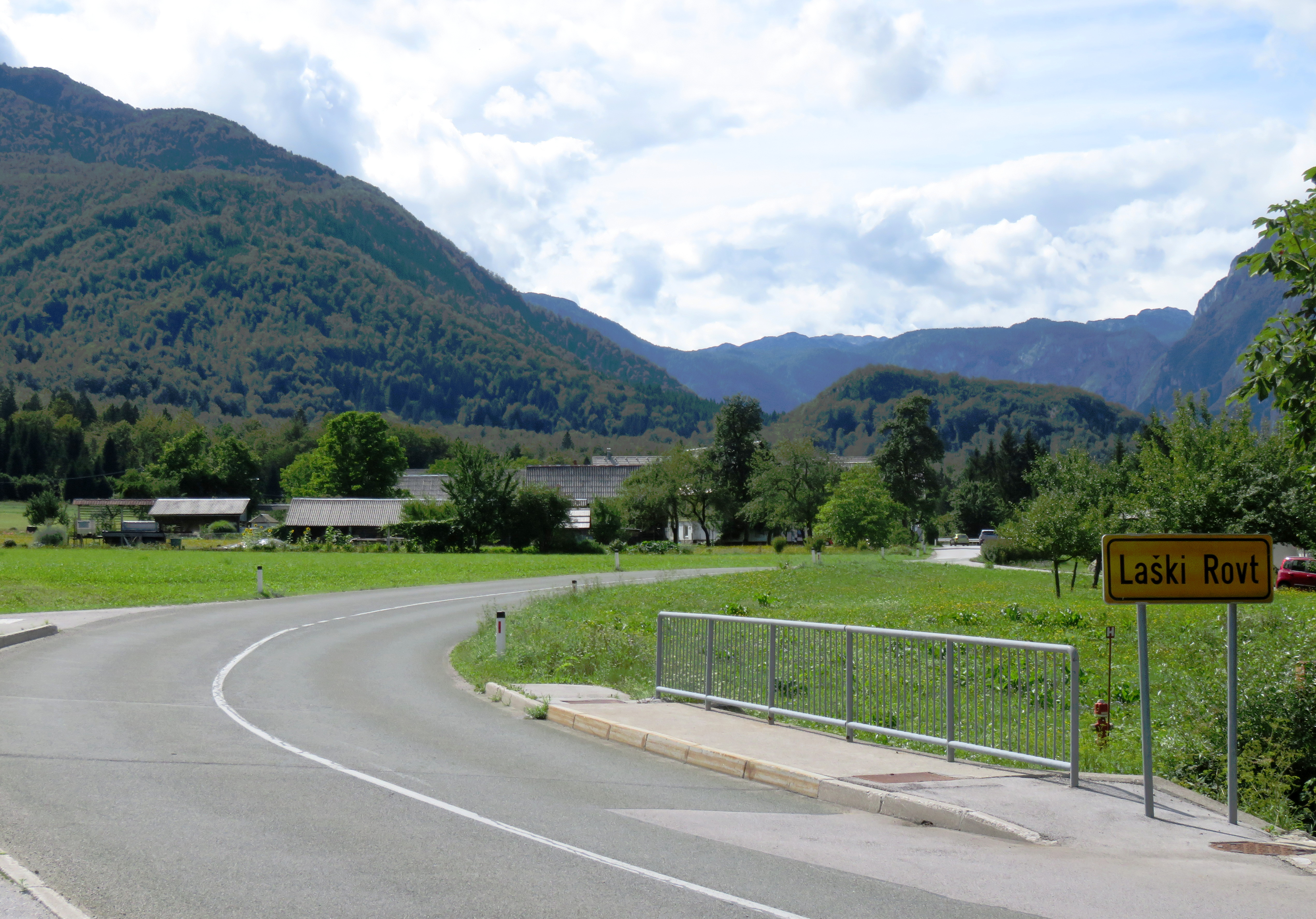

- Location in Slovenia
- Coordinates: 46°16′4.23″N 13°54′10.15″E
- Country: Slovenia
- Traditional region: Upper Carniola
- Statistical region: Upper Carniola
- Municipality: Bohinj
- Elevation: 528 m (1,732 ft)

Population (2020)
  - Total: 40

Laški Rovt (pronounced [ˈlaːʃki ˈɾoːu̯t], German: Wälschgereuth) is a settlement on the right bank of the Sava Bohinjka River in the Municipality of Bohinj in the Upper Carniola region of Slovenia.
