= Podjelje =

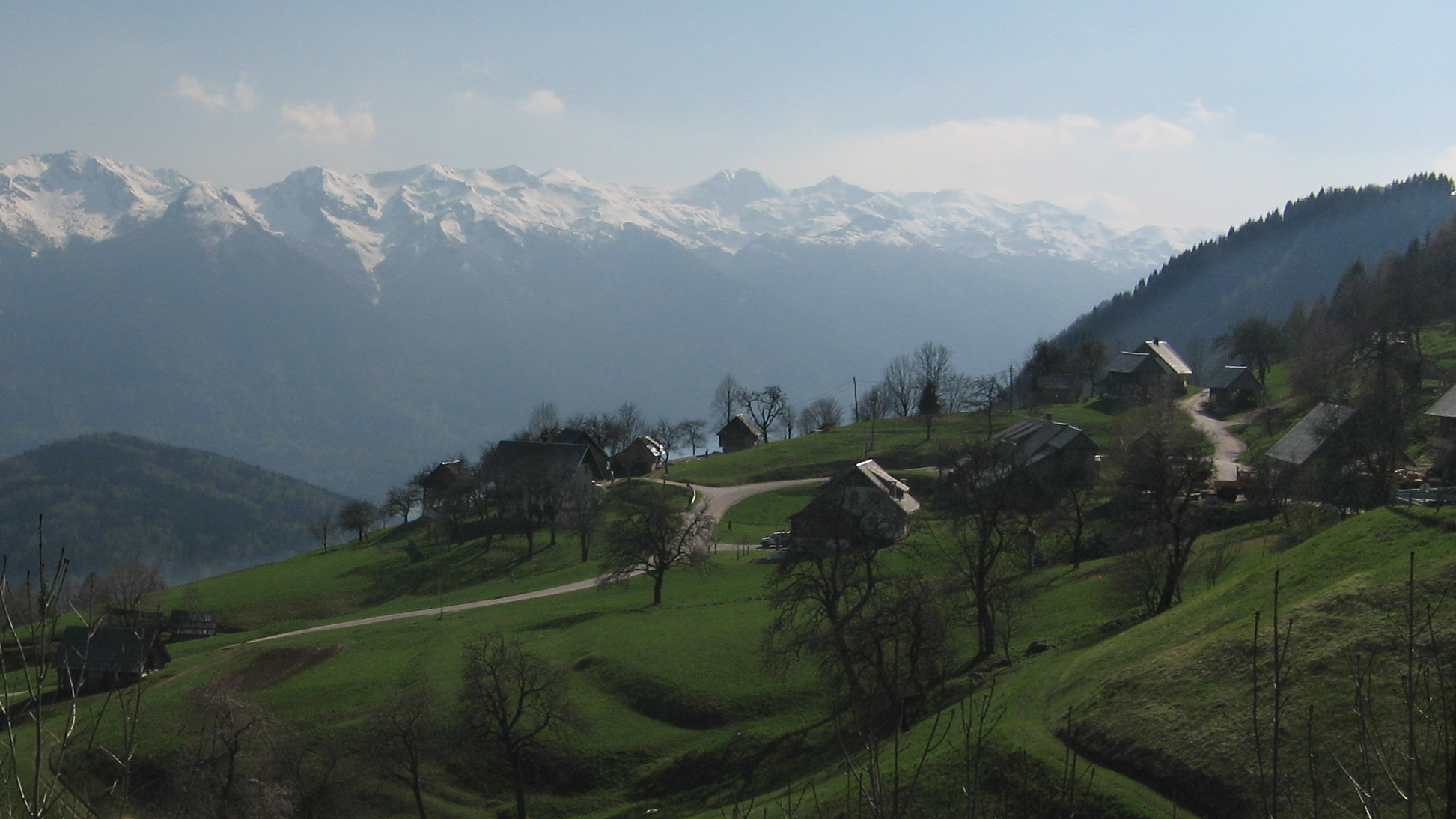
- Podjelje

- Location in Slovenia
- Coordinates: 46°18′48.7″N 13°57′37.73″E
- Country: Slovenia
- Traditional region: Upper Carniola
- Statistical region: Upper Carniola
- Municipality: Bohinj
- Elevation: 1,029 m (3,376 ft)

Population (2020)
  - Total: 77

Podjelje (pronounced [pɔdˈjeːljɛ]) is a high-elevation settlement in the Municipality of Bohinj in the Upper Carniola region of Slovenia.

== Name ==
The name Podjelje is a fused prepositional phrase (pod 'below' + Jelje) that has lost case inflection. The name refers to the location of the village below the Jelje mountain pasture, which is located in neighboring Goreljek.
