= Žlan =

- Settlement
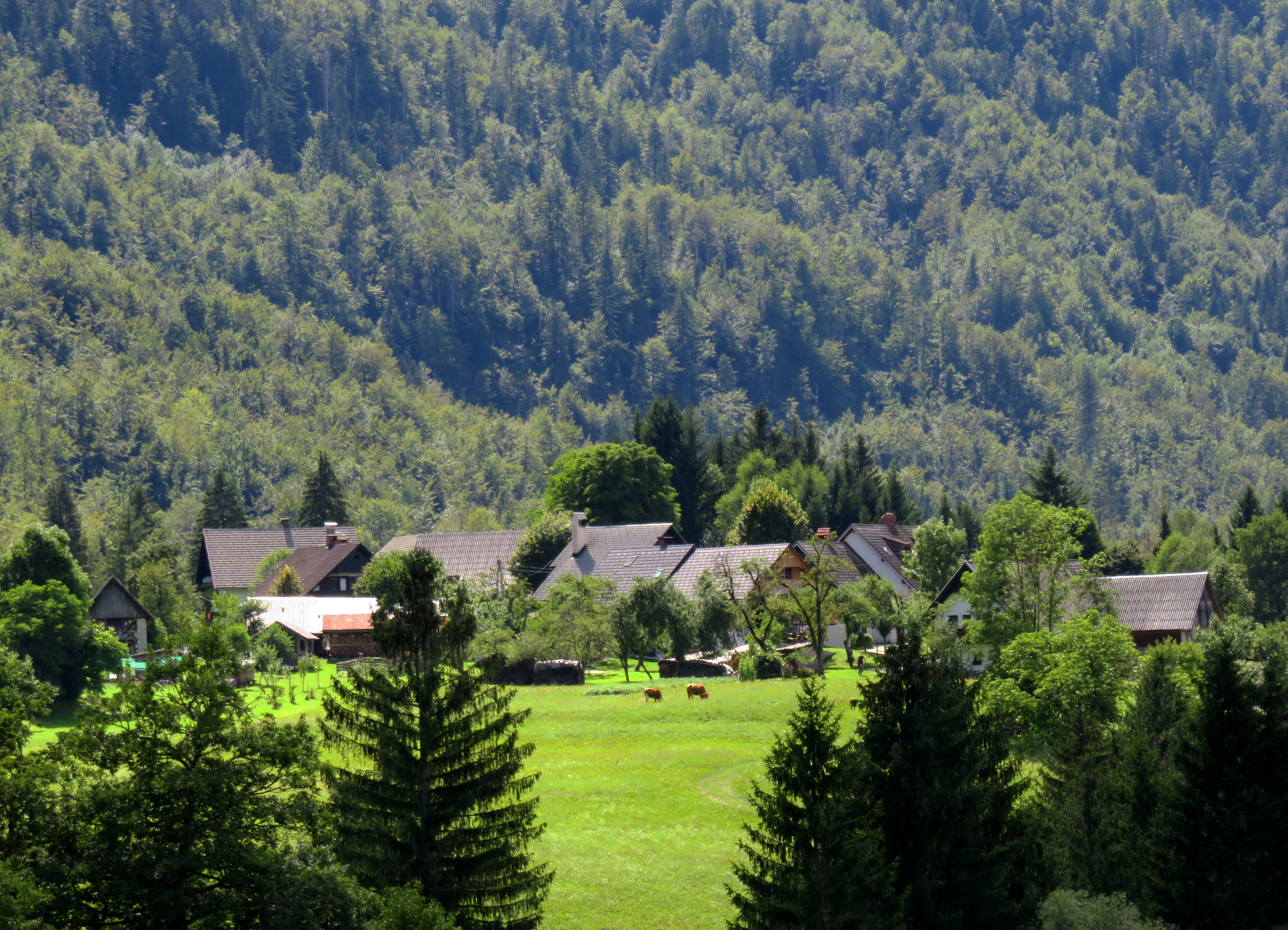
- Žlan

- Location in Slovenia
- Coordinates: 46°15′52.4″N 13°55′7.4″E
- Country: Slovenia
- Traditional region: Upper Carniola
- Statistical region: Upper Carniola
- Municipality: Bohinj
- Elevation: 571.9 m (1,876 ft)

Population (2025)
  - Total: 9
- Time zone: UTC+01 (CET)
  - Summer (DST): UTC+02 (CEST)

Žlan (pronounced [ˈʒlaːn]) is a small settlement in the Municipality of Bohinj in the Upper Carniola region of northwestern Slovenia.

== Geography ==
Žlan is located in the mountainous Upper Carniola region, at an elevation of about 572 meters (1,877 ft). The settlement lies near Bohinjska Bistrica, and a trail to the peak of Črna Prst passes through the area.

== Name ==
Žlan was attested in historical sources as Schlan and Shlan in 1763–1787. It may be a borrowing from Bavarian German *Schlewn, which is presumed borrowed from Slovene žleb 'gorge, ravine', thus referring to the local geography.

== Natural features ==
The area around Žlan is rich in forests and mountain paths. A spring near Žlan provides fresh water to the Bohinj area.

== See also ==
- Municipality of Bohinj
- Upper Carniola
