= Kamnje, Bohinj =

Kamnje
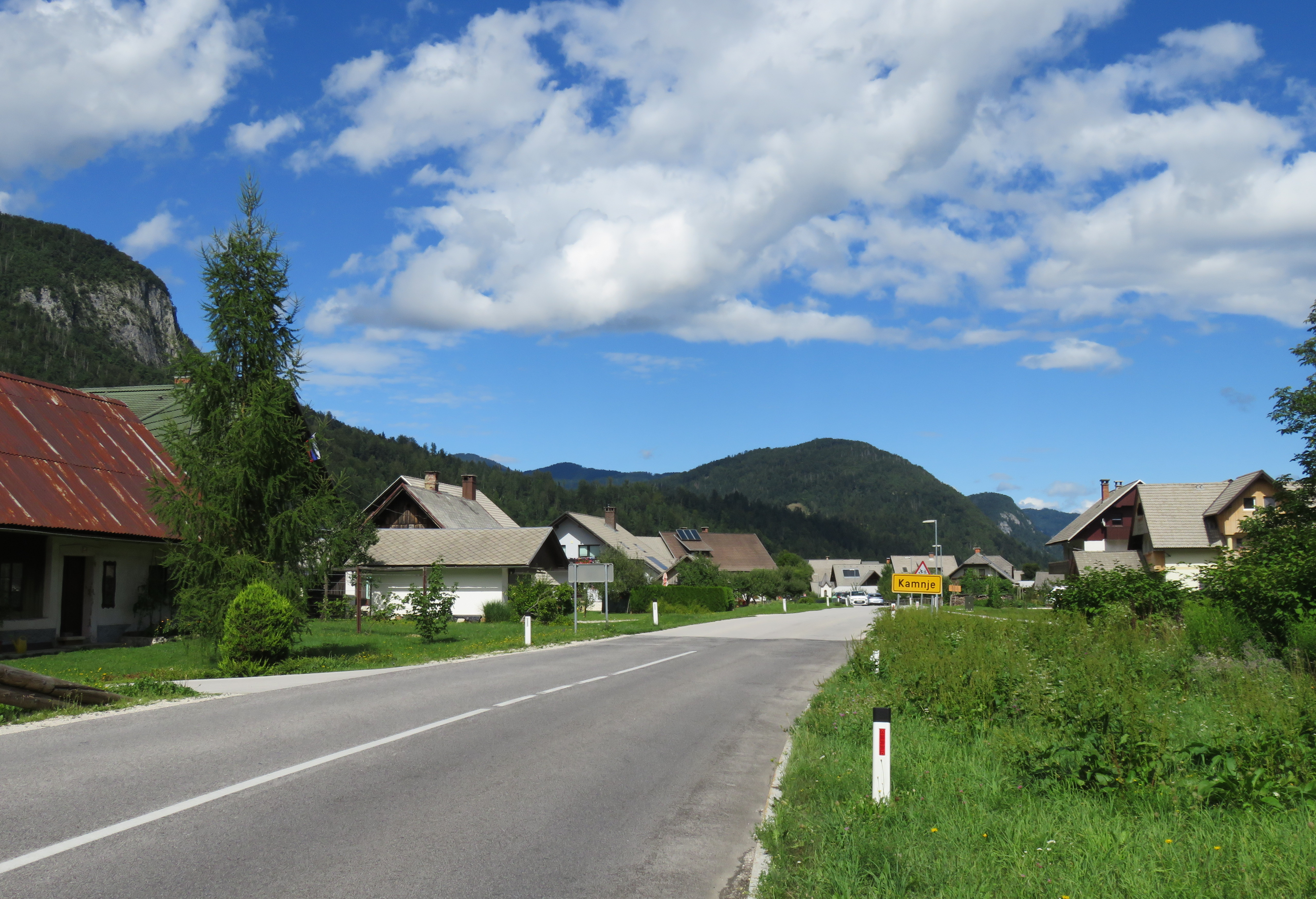

- Location in Slovenia
- Coordinates: 46°16′19.61″N 13°55′6.87″E
- Country: Slovenia
- Traditional region: Upper Carniola
- Statistical region: Upper Carniola
- Municipality: Bohinj
- Elevation: 515.8 m (1,692 ft)

Population (2020)
  - Total: 209

Kamnje (pronounced [ˈkaːmnjɛ]) is a settlement on the right bank of the Sava Bohinjka River in the Municipality of Bohinj in the Upper Carniola region of Slovenia.
