= Bohinj =

Region in Slovenia

Coordinates: 46°16′25.99″N 13°57′2.08″E

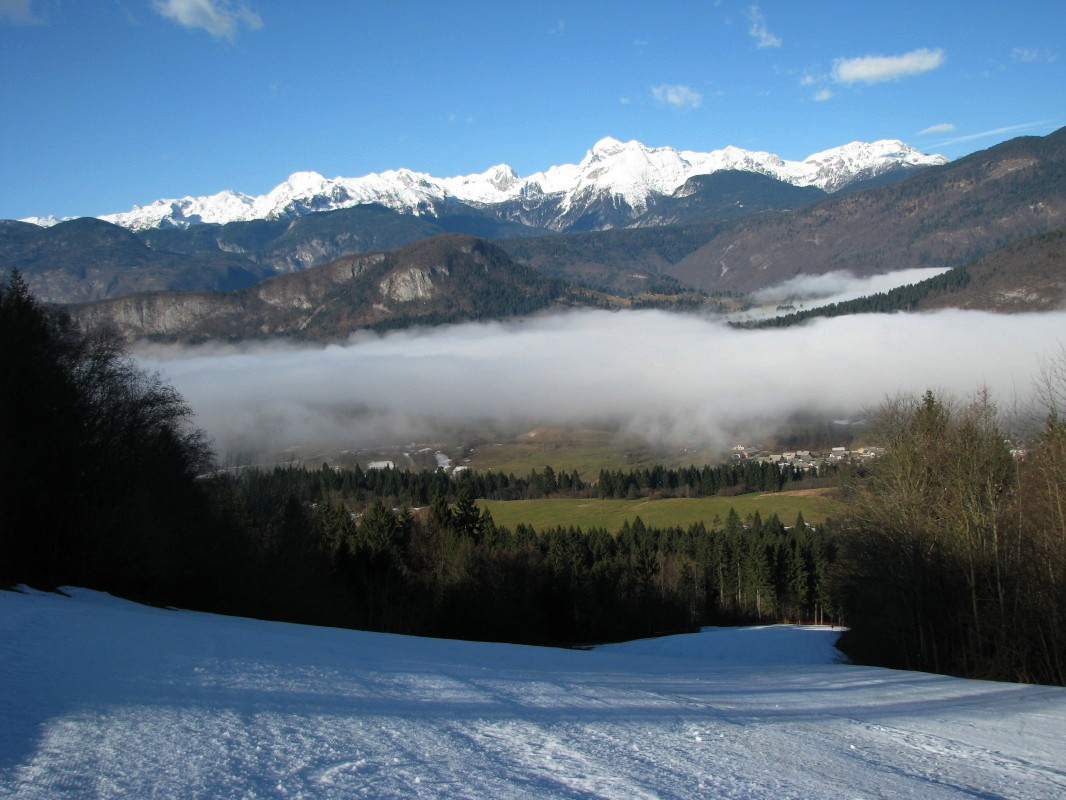
Bohinj and Julian Alps from the ski slopes of Kobla, above Bohinjska Bistrica

Bohinj (Slovene pronunciation: [ˈbɔ̀ːxin]; German: Wochein), or the Bohinj Valley (Slovene: Bohinjska dolina) or Bohinj Basin (Slovene: Bohinjska kotlina), is a 20 km long and 5 km wide basin in the Julian Alps, in the Upper Carniola region of northwestern Slovenia. It is traversed by the Sava Bohinjka river. Its main feature is the periglacial Lake Bohinj (Slovene: Bohinjsko jezero). Bohinj is part of the Municipality of Bohinj, the seat of which is Bohinjska Bistrica.

== Geography ==
The basin consists of four geographic units: the Lower Valley (Slovene: Spodnja dolina), Upper Valley (Zgornja dolina), Ukanc Basin or Lake Basin (Ukanška kotlina; Jezerska kotlina), and Nomenj Basin (Nomenjska kotlina). It is bounded by the Komarča head wall on one end and Soteska Canyon at the other. The Lower Bohinj Mountain Range represents its southern border. The Sava River has carved a canyon between the Jelovica and Pokljuka plateaus in the east. To the north, Mount Triglav, Slovenia's highest mountain, is also a part of the municipality.

The Sava Bohinjka (which merges with the Sava Dolinka into the Sava) begins when two rivers, the Jezernica and the Mostnica, merge. The Mostnica comes from the Voje Valley, whereas the Jezernica is a very short river that flows from Lake Bohinj. Many smaller streams flow into the lake. The largest of them, the Savica, emerges in Komarča as a large waterfall. Savica Falls (Slap Savica) gets most of its water from Black Lake (Črno jezero), which is the largest in the Triglav Lakes Valley (Dolina Triglavskih jezer).

== Name ==
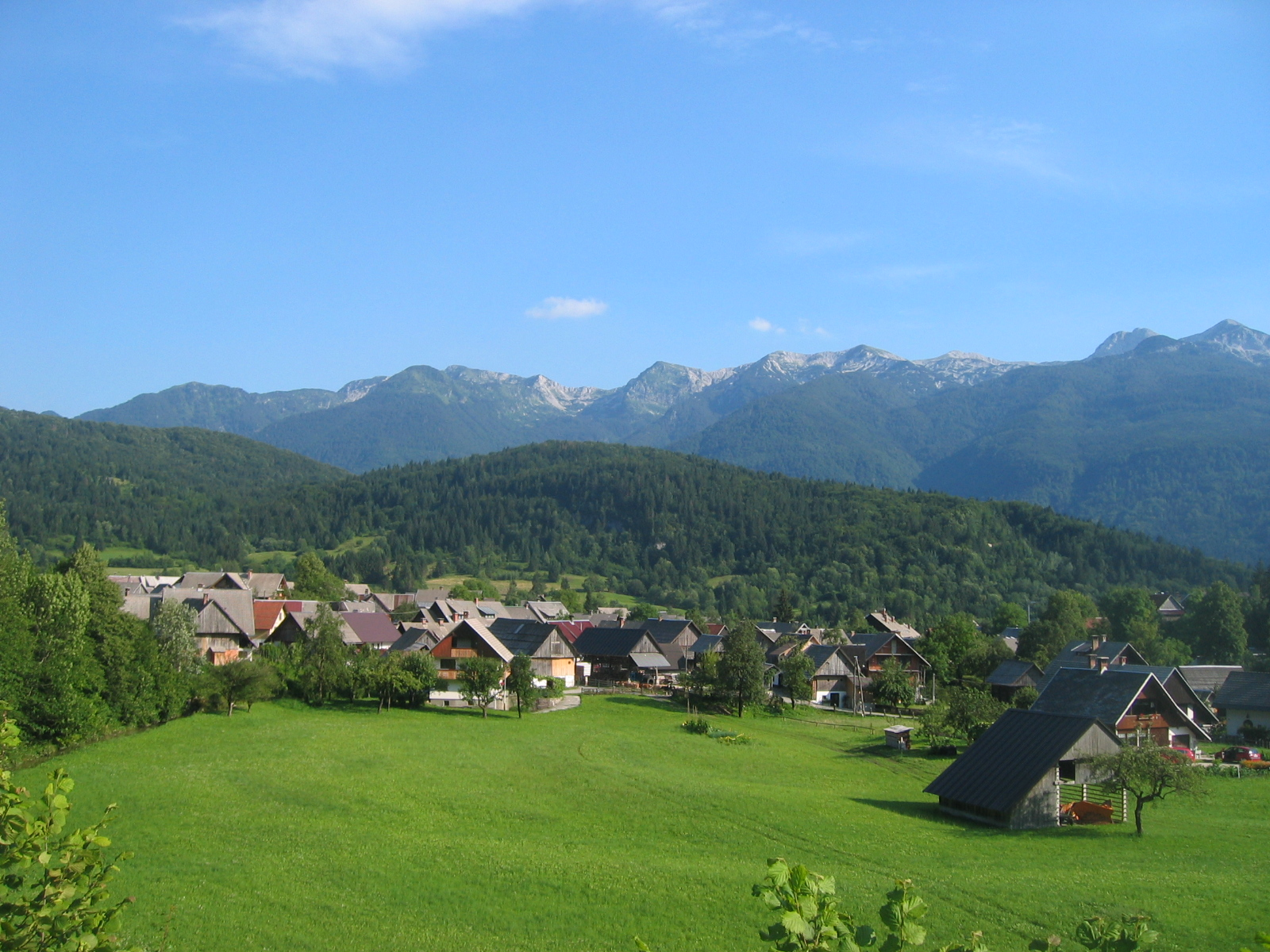
Stara Fužina, a village near Lake Bohinj

The name Bohinj originally applied to the village of Srednja Vas v Bohinju and was attested as such in written sources in 1065 as Bochingun (and as Bochingin in 1085–90, and Uochina in 1120). As a regional name, it appears in written sources in 1250 as Vochina (and as Fochin in 1253, Vochino in 1287, and Bochino in 1333). The name is derived from *Boxyn'ь, which is of unclear origin. One possibility is that it is derived from the hypocorism *Boxъ. Suggestions that it is of Celtic substratum origin are unlikely.

A popular pseudoetymology of the name is the following story: God was giving land to people and, as he finished, he realized that he had forgotten about a small group of people, who were silent and did not insist like the others. Because of their modesty and patience, he felt pity for them. That is why he decided to give them the most beautiful land of all, which he had set aside for himself. It is called Bohinj, because we call God Boh.

The basin is often referred to as a valley due to lack of a clear distinction between a valley and a basin. Another reason may be that the Slovene word dolina 'valley' in the names of various Slovenian regions does not refer to a valley in the geomorphological sense, but in the sense of an area at a lower elevation surrounded by higher land, which is a much more common understanding of the term.

== History ==
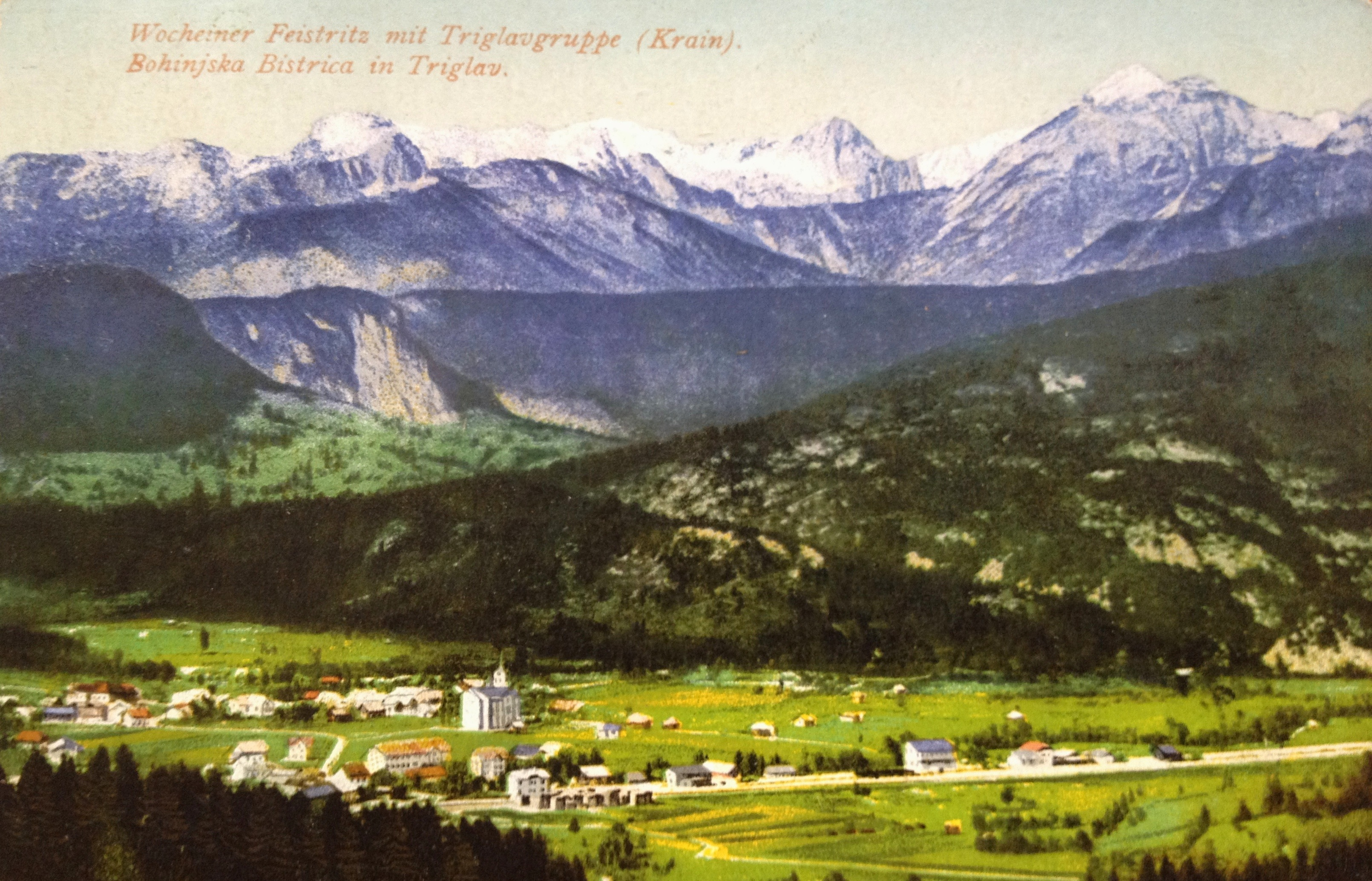
Picture of Bohinjska Bistrica with Mt. Triglav in the background, from 1905

Geographic circumstances have contributed to isolation of Bohinj in the past. The 5,000 inhabitants are mostly descendants of the native people of Bohinj. There are historical findings that prove the valley was populated as early as in the Bronze Age.

France Prešeren, Slovenia's leading poet, wrote the epic-lyric poem The Baptism on the Savica, which is largely fictional but depicts the time of violent baptism of pagans and battles between the Christians and pagans. Most of the story takes place in Bohinj and in Bled.

== Myths ==
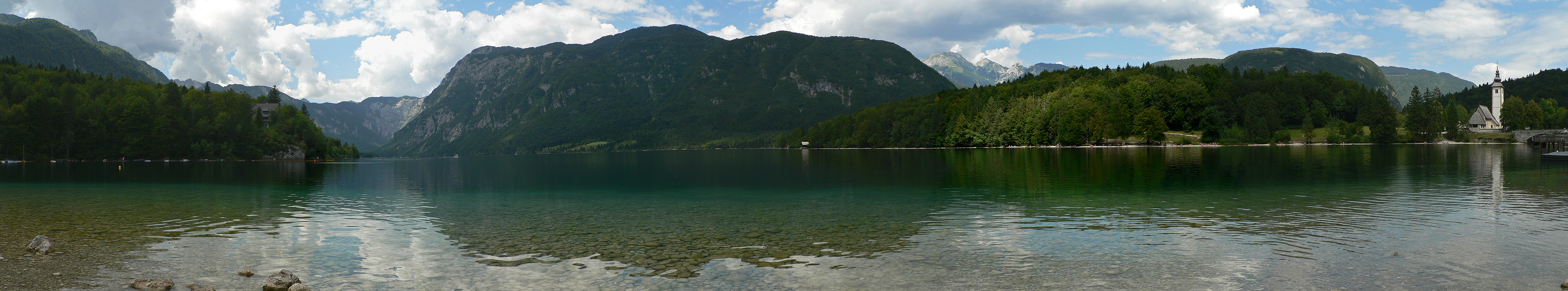
Lake Bohinj

There are many legends and myths relating to Bohinj. Most are short and humorous.

- It is said that the Turks (the mighty conquerors) turned around when they had tried to invade Bohinj, because they thought it was the end of the world. A village called Obrne (from Slovene obrniti - to turn around) is named after the alleged Turkish retreat.
- A magic creature, Zlatorog (the Goldhorn), lives in the mountains.
- A group of the evil hunters' spirits, called divja jaga, is moving through the woods and bring death and suffering to those who don't hide in time.
- Devil's Bridge (Slovene: Hudičev most) was according to the legend created by the Devil. He made a deal with the people that were unable to build the bridge by themselves because it always collapsed. The deal was that, if he built the bridge for them, the first soul to cross it would be his. The people agreed, but couldn't decide whom to send when it was finished. But one farmer sent a dog across. The Devil went mad when he realised that they had tricked him.

== People ==
The isolation has also contributed to a development of a specific dialect that is very different from the Upper Carniolan dialect. There is also a notable difference between the dialects in the inner valleys. People live in 24 villages, the largest of them being Bohinjska Bistrica.

== Tourism ==
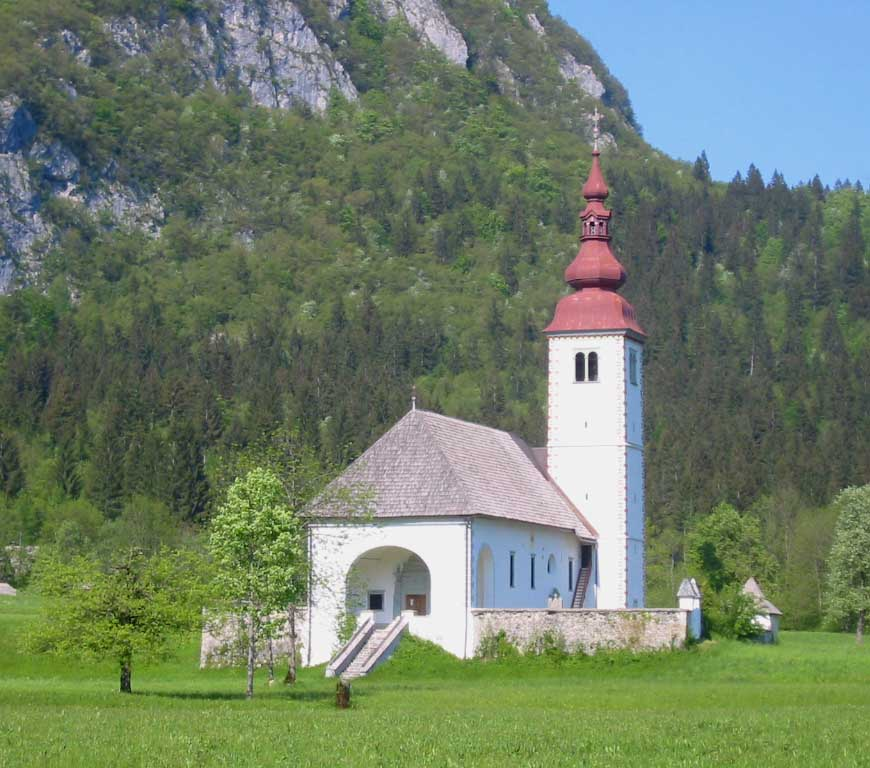
Assumption Church in Bitnje

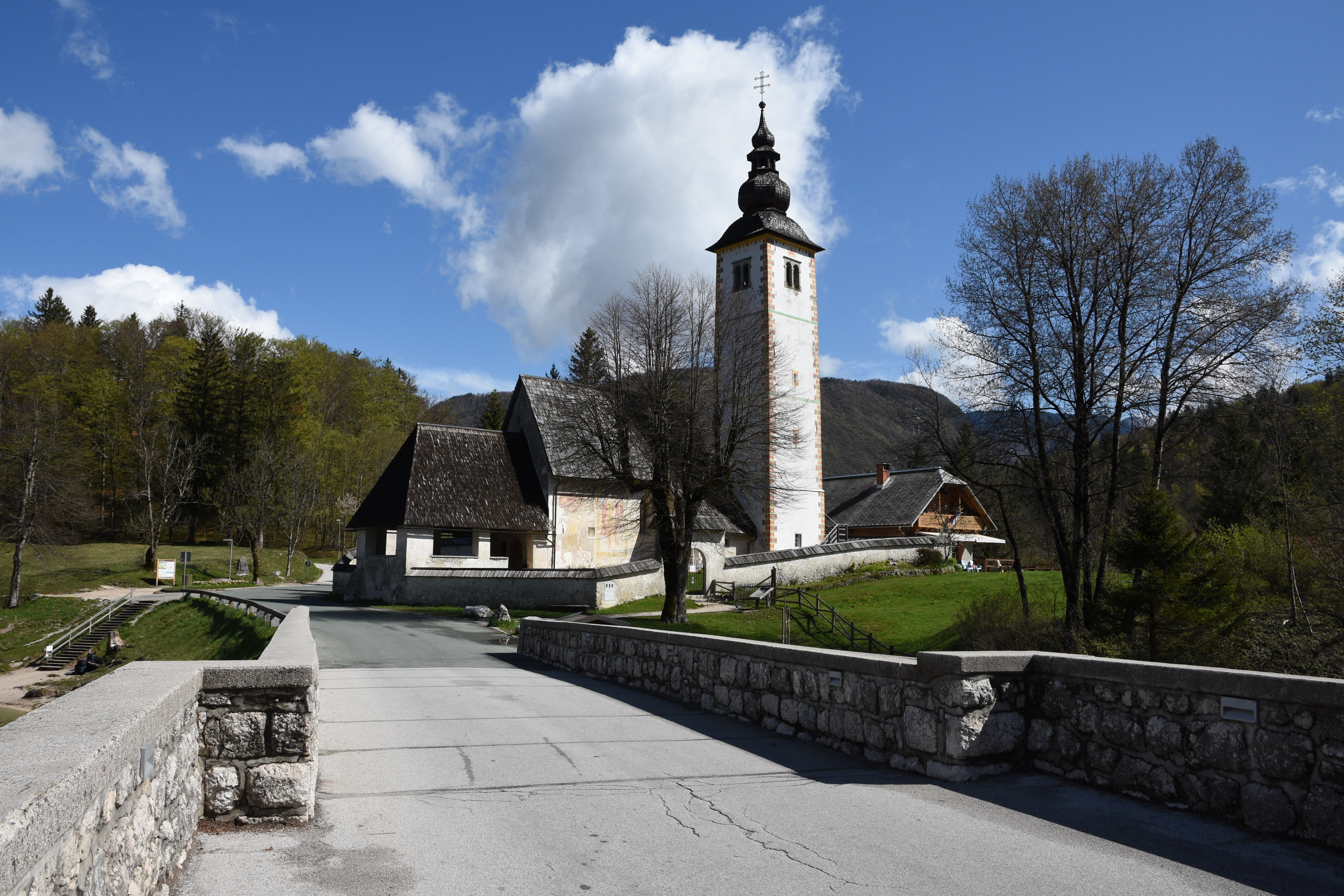
St. John the Baptist Parish Church in Ribčev Laz

Bohinj began opening up for tourists years ago, with natural attractions being the biggest draw.

Bohinj has become a starting point for tourists for day trips, for walks on the trails that run throughout the valley, and for mountaineering and climbing tours. It is also associated with the nearby Bohinj Railway, which includes the Bohinj Tunnel.

In winter the valley becomes a winter sports centre for skiers, snowboarders, ice climbers, as well as ice skaters on Lake Bohinj. During the summer, Lake Bohinj is frequented by swimmers, and with the Sava Bohinjka River, kayakers and fishermen as well. Biking, trekking and climbing are also typical tourist activities in the area.
