= Savica, Bohinj =

Savica
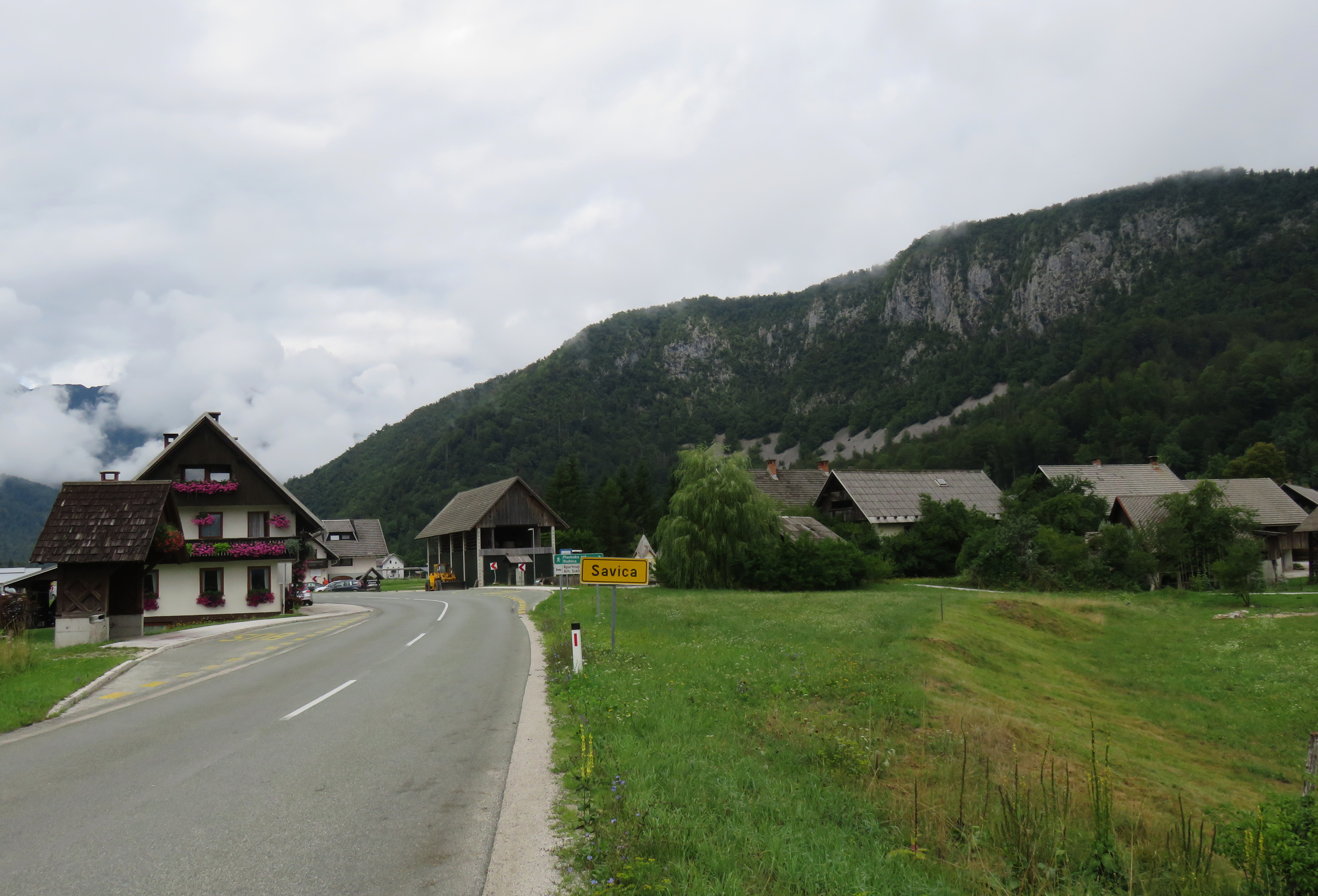

- Location in Slovenia
- Coordinates: 46°16′25.32″N 13°55′28.71″E
- Country: Slovenia
- Traditional region: Upper Carniola
- Statistical region: Upper Carniola
- Municipality: Bohinj
- Elevation: 513.7 m (1,685 ft)

Population (2020)
  - Total: 53

Savica (pronounced [saˈʋiːtsa], German: Sawitz) is a settlement on the right bank of the Sava Bohinjka River in the Municipality of Bohinj in the Upper Carniola region of Slovenia.
