= Gorjuše =

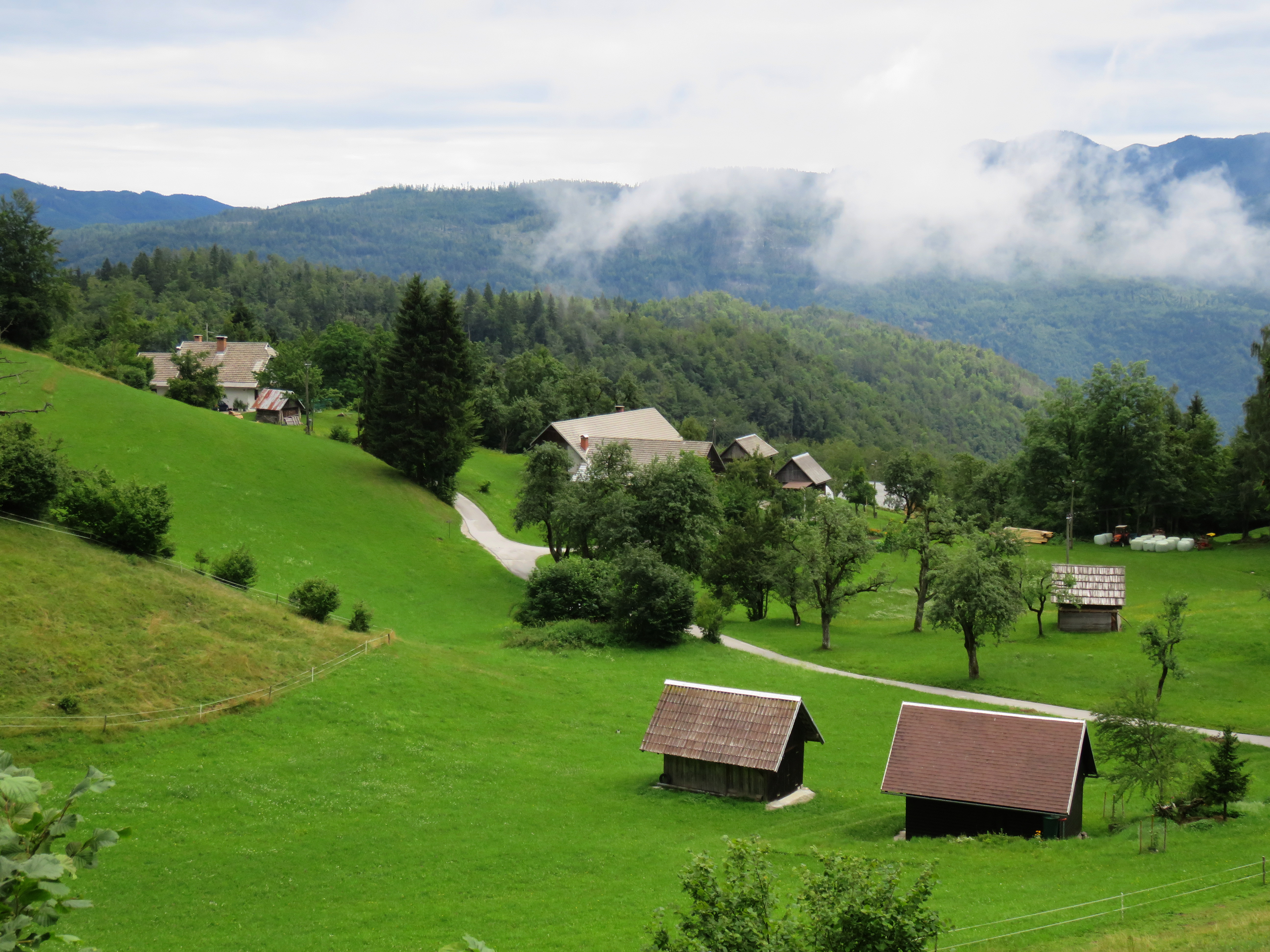

- Location in Slovenia
- Coordinates: 46°18′23.87″N 14°0′53.1″E
- Country: Slovenia
- Traditional region: Upper Carniola
- Statistical region: Upper Carniola
- Municipality: Bohinj
- Elevation: 942.3 m (3,092 ft)

Population (2020)
  - Total: 137

Gorjuše (pronounced [ɡɔˈɾjuːʃɛ]) is a high-elevation settlement on the Pokljuka Plateau in the Municipality of Bohinj in the Upper Carniola region of Slovenia. It is made up of the three disconnected hamlets of Spodnje Gorjuše, Srednje Gorjuše, and Zgornje Gorjuše (literally, 'lower, middle, and upper Gorjuše').
