= Goreljek =

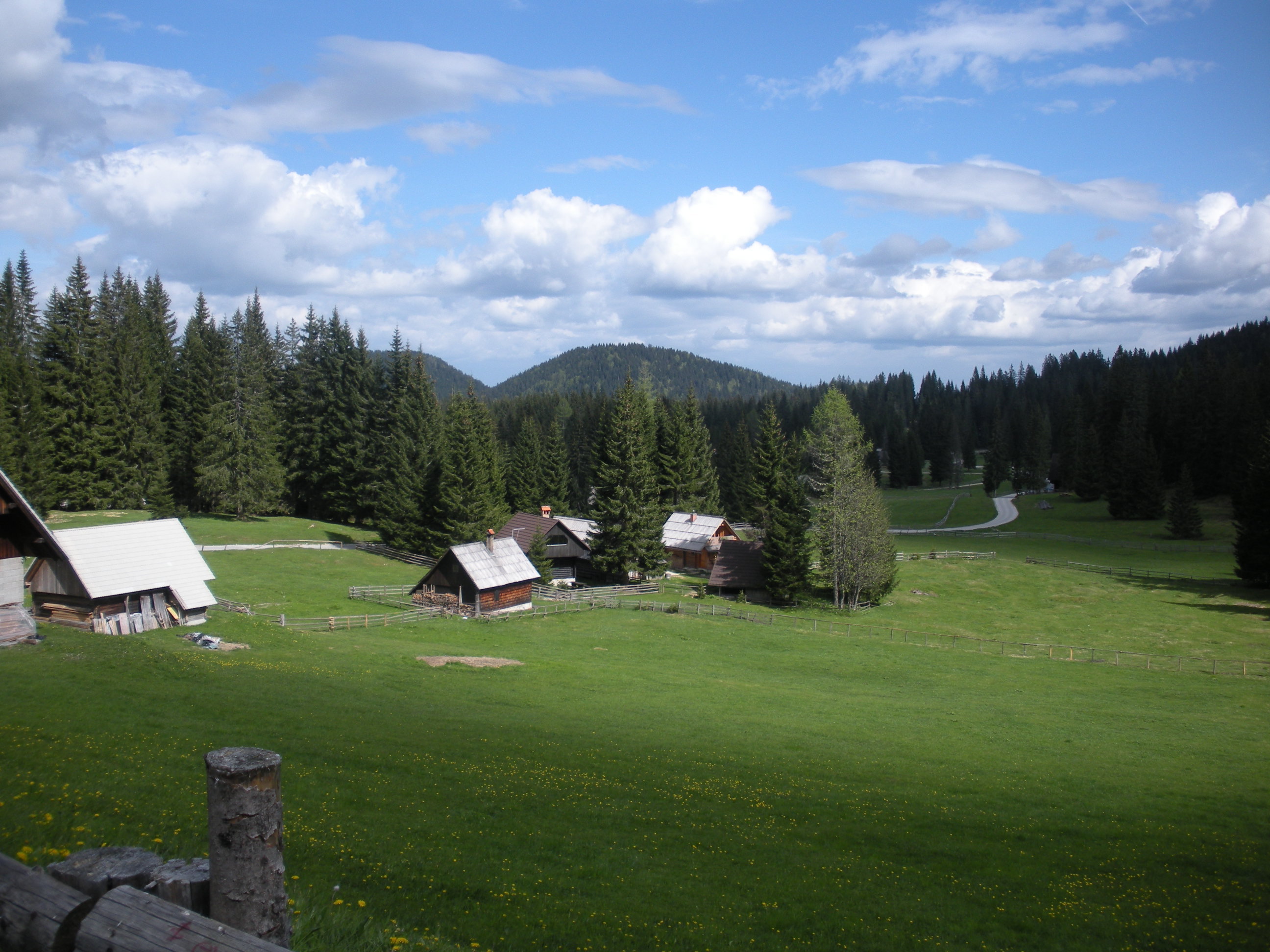

- Location in Slovenia
- Coordinates: 46°19′55.57″N 13°58′29.3″E
- Country: Slovenia
- Traditional region: Upper Carniola
- Statistical region: Upper Carniola
- Municipality: Bohinj

Area
  - Total: 13.5 km^{2} (5.2 sq mi)
- Elevation: 1,257.9 m (4,127 ft)

Population (2025)
  - Total: 9
  - Density: 0.67/km^{2} (1.7/sq mi)

Goreljek (pronounced [ɡɔˈɾeːljək] or [ɡɔˈɾeːljɛk]) is a high-elevation settlement on the Pokljuka Plateau in the Municipality of Bohinj in the Upper Carniola region of Slovenia. It has less than ten residents, but there are a large number of holiday homes in Goreljek and its immediate area. The northern part of the settlement's territory extends into the Ore Valley (Slovene: Rudna dolina). The local chapel is dedicated to Saint Anthony the Hermit and was rebuilt in a modern alpine style in 1996.

== History ==
Goreljek was first attested in written sources as Gorellegk in 1494, and it was originally a mountain pasture belonging to the village of Koprivnik v Bohinju. During the Second World War, German forces surrounded and destroyed most of the 3rd Battalion of the Partisans' Prešeren Brigade at Goreljek on December 15, 1943.
