= Ravne v Bohinju =

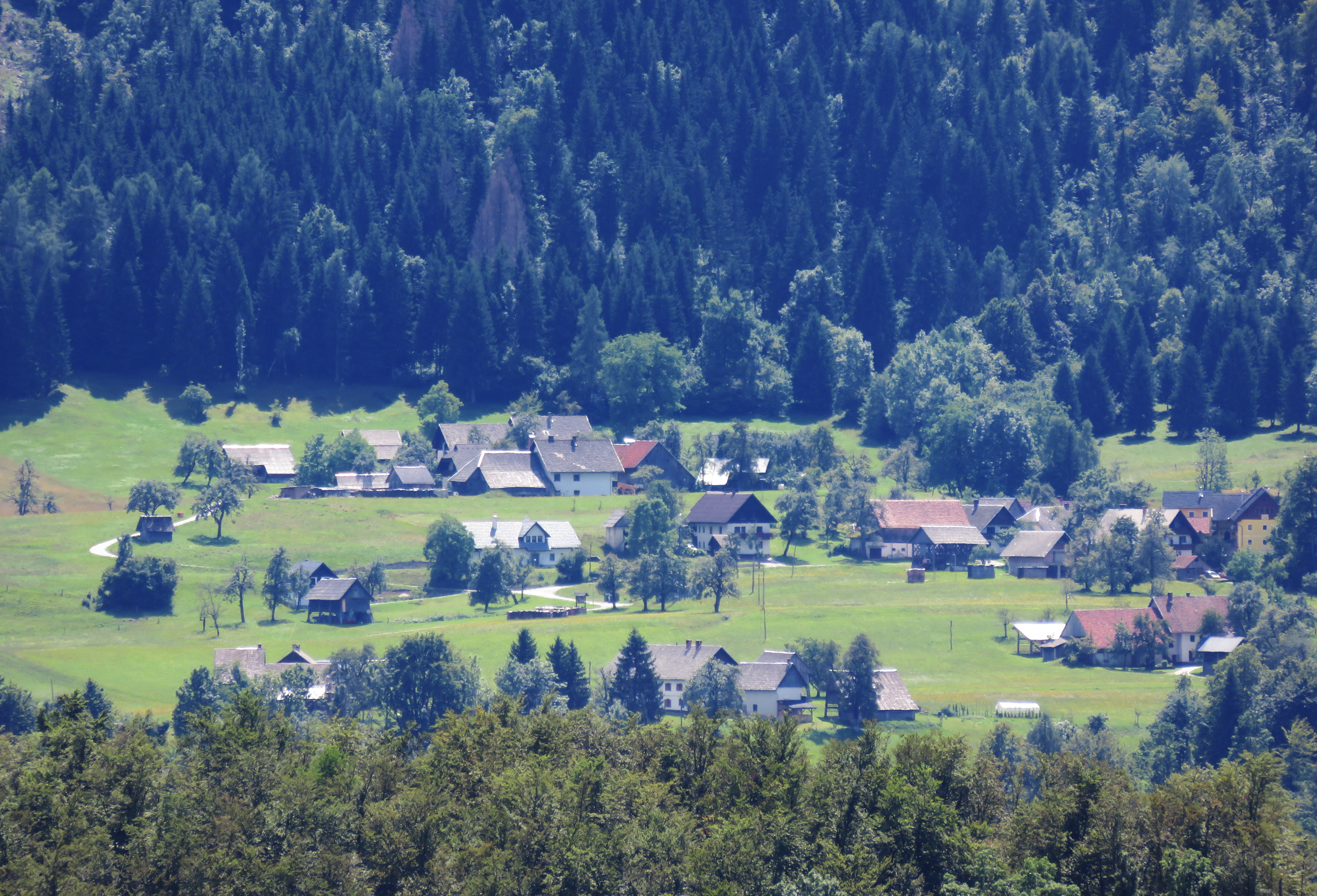

- Location in Slovenia
- Coordinates: 46°15′33.19″N 13°57′51.23″E
- Country: Slovenia
- Traditional region: Upper Carniola
- Statistical region: Upper Carniola
- Municipality: Bohinj
- Elevation: 731.6 m (2,400 ft)

Population (2020)
  - Total: 42

Ravne v Bohinju (pronounced [ˈɾáːwnɛ w bɔˈxíːnju]) is a settlement in the Municipality of Bohinj in the Upper Carniola region of Slovenia. It includes the hamlets of Spodnji Konec, Zgornji Konec, and Dolino.

== Geography ==
Ravne v Bohinju lies on a sloping mountain terrace above the railroad tunnel south of Bohinjska Bistrica. The village has a road connection to Bohinjska Bistrica, and the road continues west from the village into the foothills of the Komna Plateau. There are three springs in the village: one at the Pavle Clearing (Pavletov rovt) in Spodnji Konec, one at the Balant Commons (Balantova gmjana) in Zgornji Konec, and one at the Klemenc Commons (Klemenčeva gmajna) in Dolino.

== Name ==
The name of the settlement was changed from Ravne to Ravne v Bohinju in 1955.

== History ==
Cheese-making and dairy activity were formerly important economic activities in Ravne v Bohinju. Cheese-making was abandoned soon after the Second World War and the dairy industry went into decline.

=== Mass grave ===
Ravne v Bohinju is the site of a mass grave from the Second World War. The Jate Shaft Mass Grave (Slovene: Grobišče Brezno na Jatah) is located in the woods southwest of the settlement, at a site where water collects and flows into a cave during heavy rain. The shaft contains the remains of two people thrown into the cave during the war.
