= Studor v Bohinju =

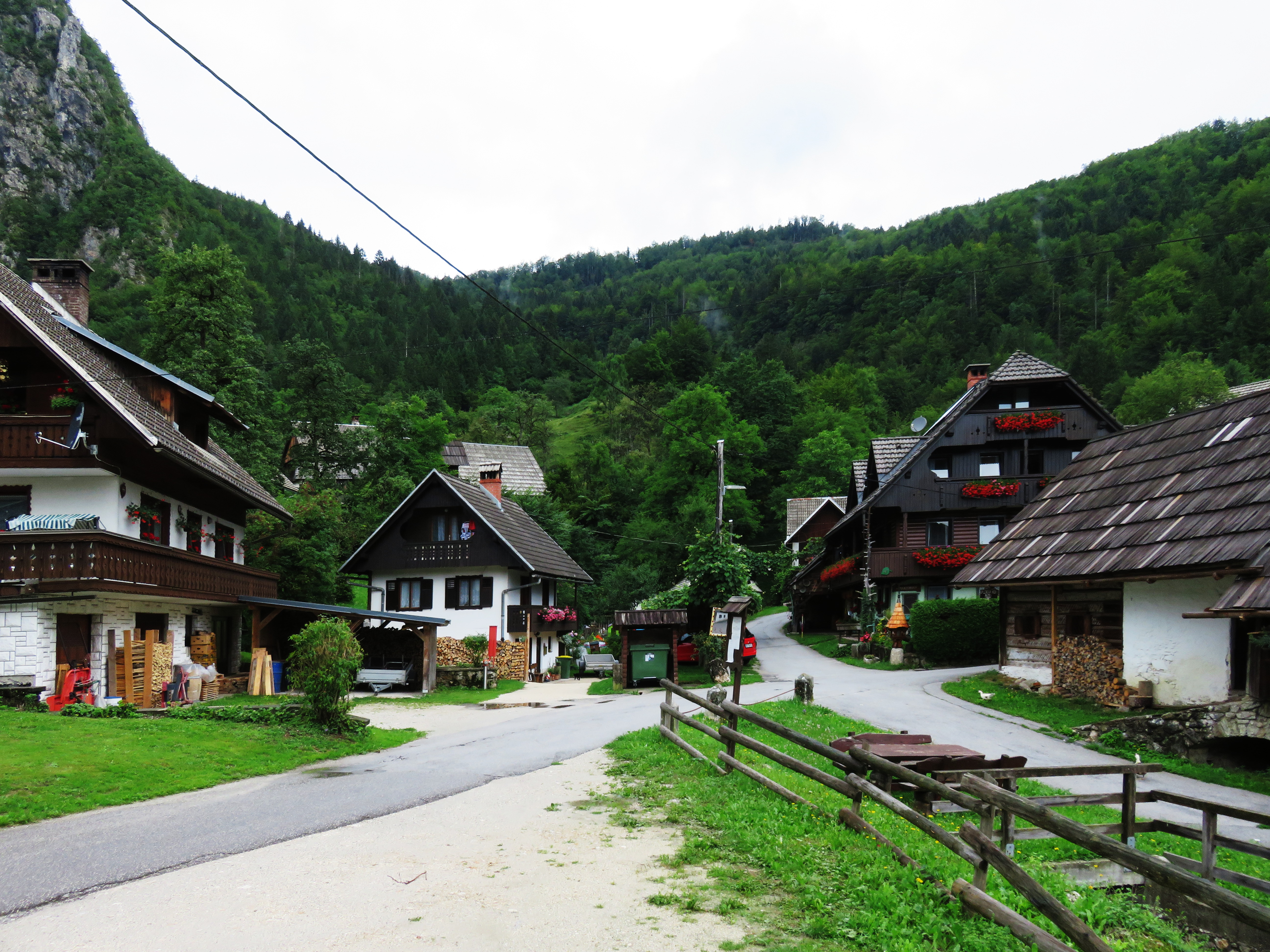

- Location in Slovenia
- Coordinates: 46°17′41.43″N 13°54′53.58″E
- Country: Slovenia
- Traditional region: Upper Carniola
- Statistical region: Upper Carniola
- Municipality: Bohinj
- Elevation: 592.2 m (1,943 ft)

Population (2020)
  - Total: 116

Studor v Bohinju (pronounced [stuˈdɔ́ɾ w bɔˈxíːnju]) is a village in the Municipality of Bohinj in the Upper Carniola region of Slovenia. Mount Studor rises above the village.

== Name ==
The name of the settlement was changed from Studor to Studor v Bohinju in 1955. The name of the settlement was first attested in 1291 as Ztodar. The name was originally an oronym, *Stodor, derived from Common Slavic *stodorъ 'sharp peak'. The pronunciation Stu- for Sto- is a dialect feature (Slovene: ukanje) that has become standardized in this toponym.

== Hayracks ==
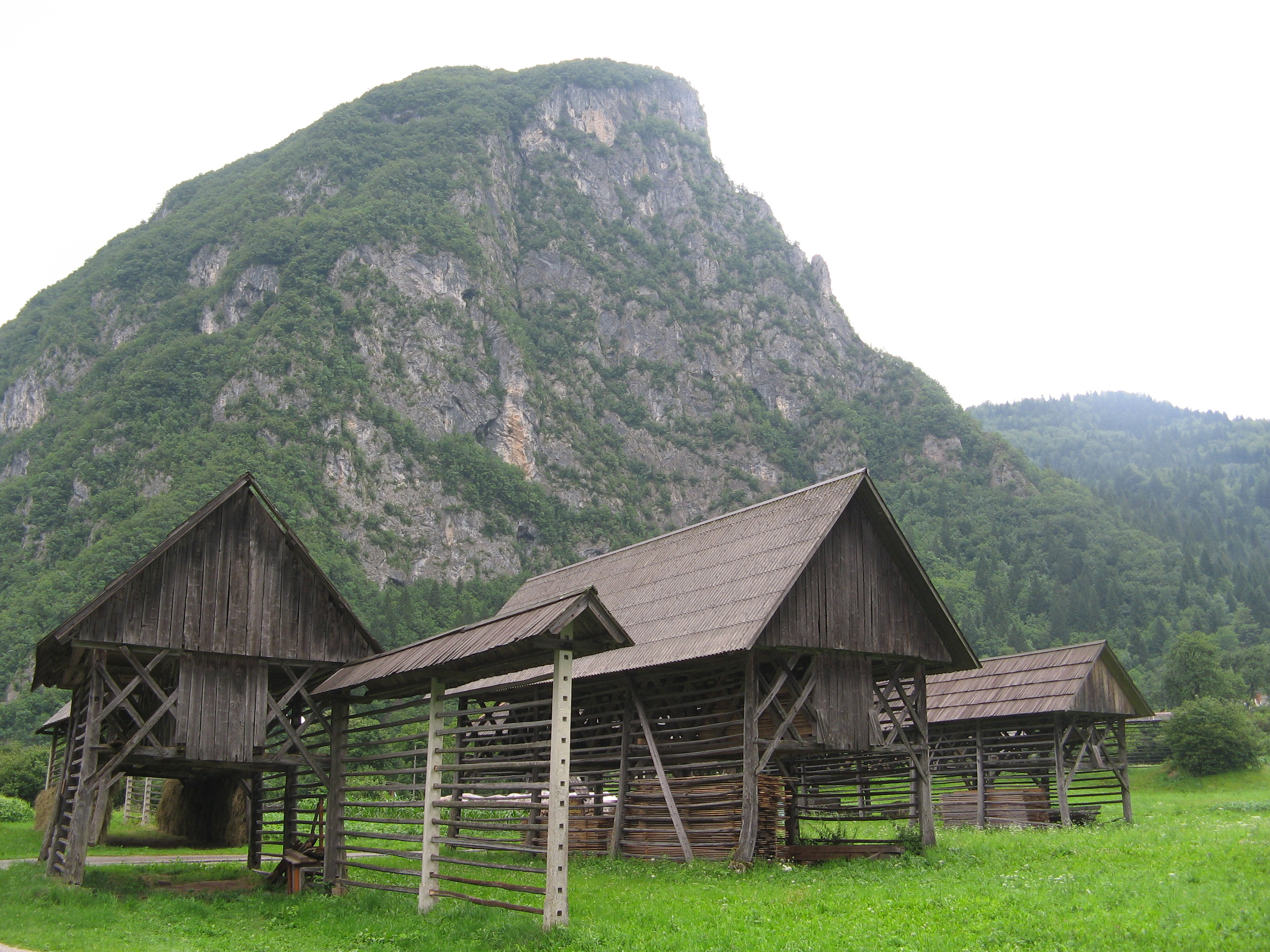
Hayracks in Studor v Bohinju with Mount Studor in the background

Studor v Bohinju is known for its group of wooden hayracks just below the village. The double structure of these hayracks is particular to the area and the Studor v Bohinju group of hayracks has been declared an architectural monument. There is also a small ethnographic museum in the village at the Oplen house (Slovene: Oplenova hiša) at Studor v Bohinju no. 16.
