= Bohinjska Češnjica =

Bohinjska Češnjica Češnjica (until 1952)
- Village
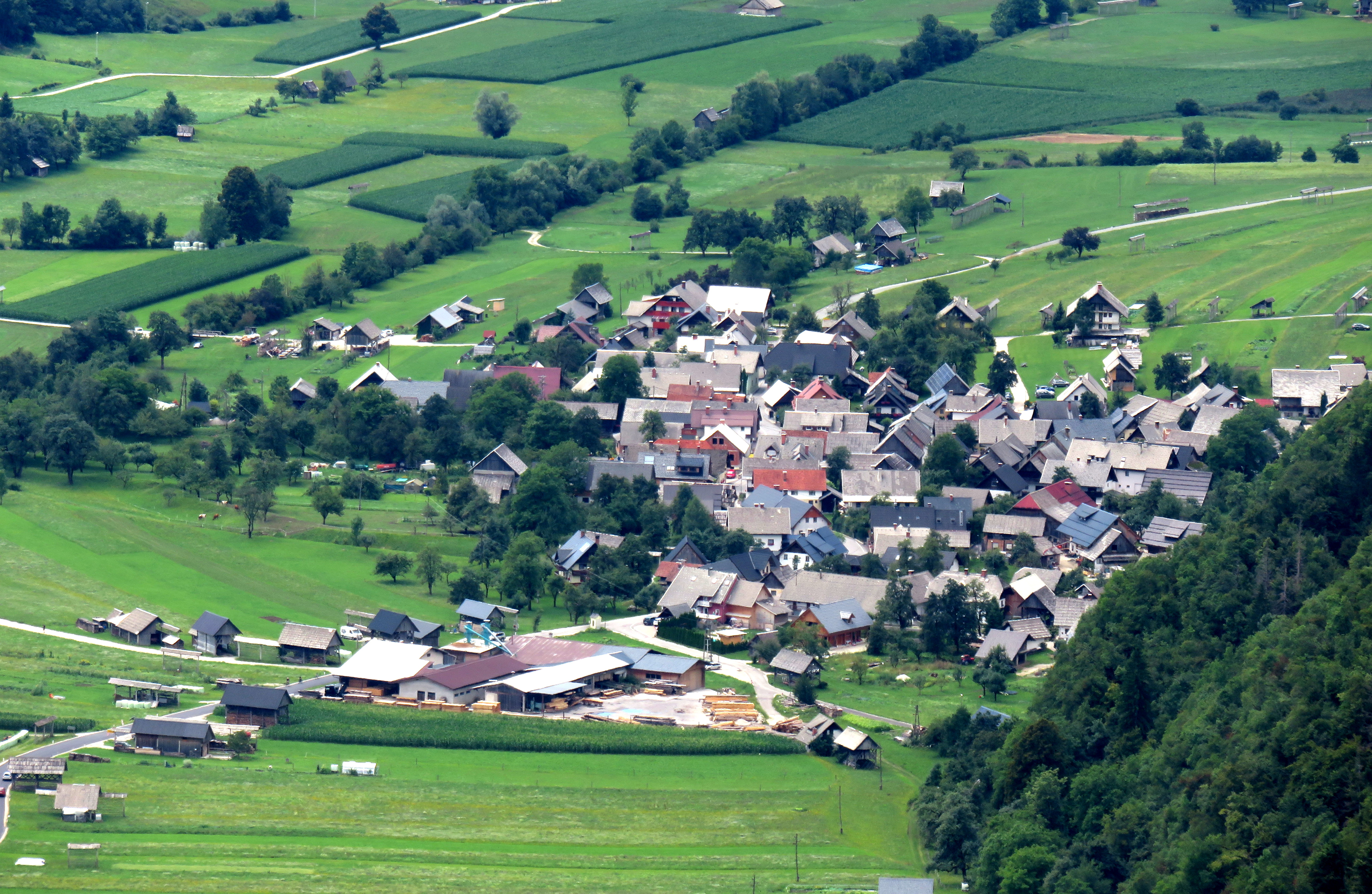

- Location in Slovenia
- Coordinates: 46°17′44.03″N 13°56′38.67″E
- Country: Slovenia
- Traditional region: Upper Carniola
- Statistical region: Upper Carniola
- Municipality: Bohinj
- Elevation: 603.2 m (1,979 ft)

Population (2020)
  - Total: 330

Bohinjska Češnjica (pronounced [bɔˈxiːnska ˈtʃeːʃnjitsa]) is a settlement in the Municipality of Bohinj in the Upper Carniola region of Slovenia.

== Name ==
The name Bohinjska Češnjica literally means 'Češnjica in the Bohinj region'. The village was attested in historical sources as Chersdorf in 1253, Cherstorff in 1464, and Kersdorff in 1494. Like similar names (e.g., Češnjice, Češnjevek, Črešnjevci, etc.), the name is derived from the common noun češnja 'wild cherry', referring to the local vegetation. The name of the settlement was changed from Češnjica to Bohinjska Češnjica in 1952.

== Climate ==
Climate data for Bohinjska Češnjica, 1991–2020 normals, extremes 1951–2020
Month	Jan	Feb	Mar	Apr	May	Jun	Jul	Aug	Sep	Oct	Nov	Dec	Year
Record high °C (°F)	16.1 (61.0)	20.8 (69.4)	23.3 (73.9)	28.1 (82.6)	31.2 (88.2)	35.8 (96.4)	37.7 (99.9)	35.2 (95.4)	30.2 (86.4)	25.9 (78.6)	21.1 (70.0)	17.1 (62.8)	37.7 (99.9)
Mean daily maximum °C (°F)	3.6 (38.5)	6.2 (43.2)	10.8 (51.4)	15.3 (59.5)	20.1 (68.2)	24.0 (75.2)	26.1 (79.0)	25.9 (78.6)	20.7 (69.3)	15.4 (59.7)	9.0 (48.2)	3.8 (38.8)	15.1 (59.1)
Daily mean °C (°F)	−1.2 (29.8)	0.1 (32.2)	4.2 (39.6)	8.4 (47.1)	12.9 (55.2)	16.7 (62.1)	18.3 (64.9)	17.9 (64.2)	13.5 (56.3)	9.2 (48.6)	4.3 (39.7)	−0.5 (31.1)	8.6 (47.6)
Mean daily minimum °C (°F)	−4.8 (23.4)	−4.4 (24.1)	−1 (30)	2.8 (37.0)	7.0 (44.6)	10.7 (51.3)	12.3 (54.1)	12.3 (54.1)	8.8 (47.8)	5.0 (41.0)	1.0 (33.8)	−3.6 (25.5)	3.8 (38.9)
Record low °C (°F)	−24.3 (−11.7)	−26 (−15)	−22.4 (−8.3)	−8.2 (17.2)	−4 (25)	−0.9 (30.4)	1.9 (35.4)	1 (34)	−2.2 (28.0)	−9.7 (14.5)	−16 (3)	−17.5 (0.5)	−26 (−15)
Average precipitation mm (inches)	100 (3.9)	107 (4.2)	127 (5.0)	130 (5.1)	140 (5.5)	165 (6.5)	157 (6.2)	145 (5.7)	211 (8.3)	221 (8.7)	257 (10.1)	181 (7.1)	1,941 (76.3)
Average snowfall cm (inches)	33 (13)	43 (17)	24 (9.4)	9 (3.5)	0.2 (0.1)	0 (0)	0 (0)	0 (0)	0 (0)	2 (0.8)	17 (6.7)	32 (13)	160.2 (63.5)
Average extreme snow depth cm (inches)	12 (4.7)	18 (7.1)	8 (3.1)	1 (0.4)	0 (0)	0 (0)	0 (0)	0 (0)	0 (0)	0.1 (0.0)	1 (0.4)	7 (2.8)	18 (7.1)
Average precipitation days (≥ 0.1 mm)	10	10	12	14	16	15	15	14	13	13	14	11	157
Average snowy days (≥ 1 cm)	4	5	3	1	0.1	0	0	0	0	0.2	2	4	19.3
Mean monthly sunshine hours	77	102	148	165	191	209	240	227	156	113	64	60	1,752
Source: Slovenian Environment Agency (ARSO)
