= Stara Fužina =

Human settlement in Upper Carniola, Slovenia

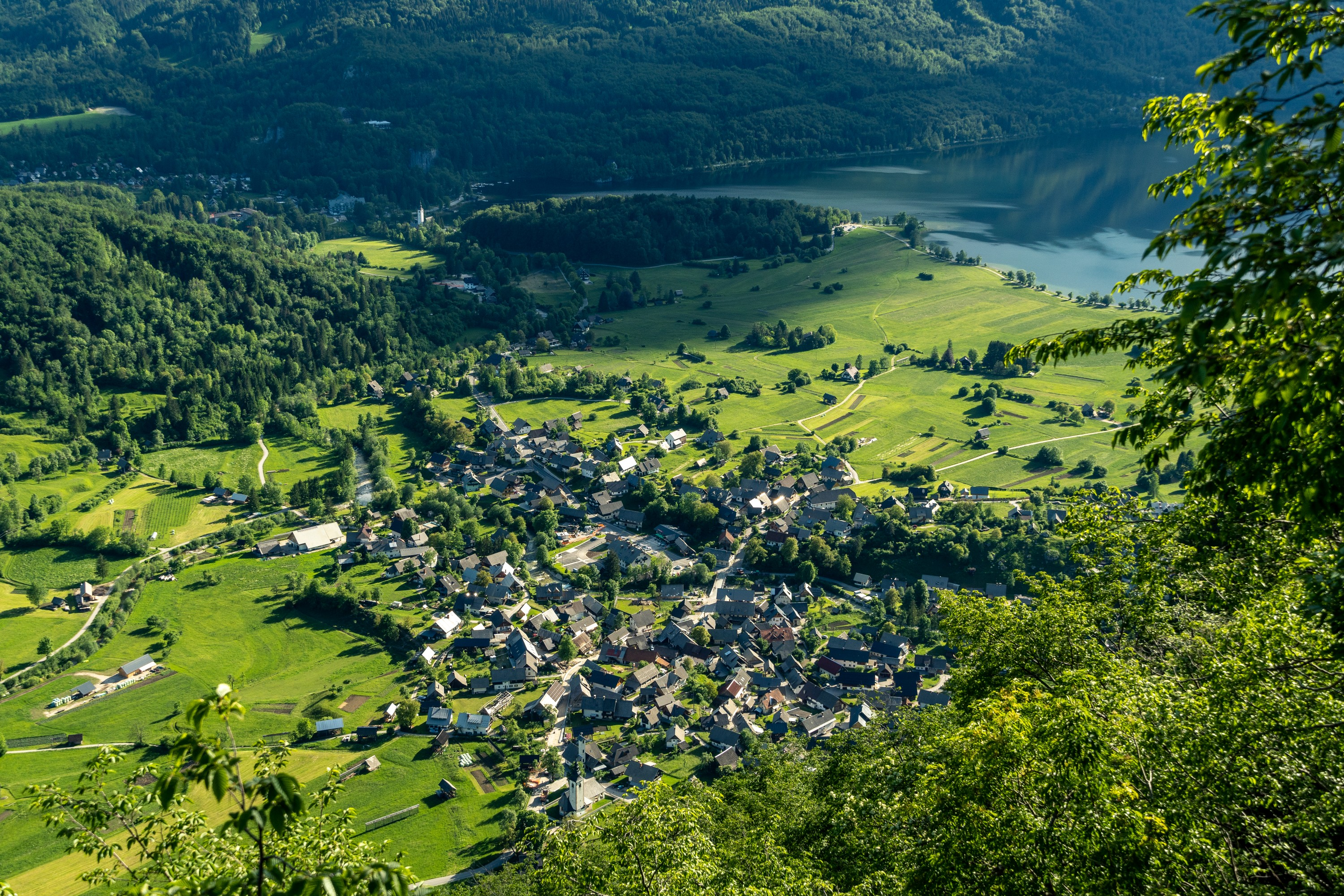
- Stara Fužina

- Location in Slovenia
- Coordinates: 46°17′23.61″N 13°53′44.78″E
- Country: Slovenia
- Traditional region: Upper Carniola
- Statistical region: Upper Carniola
- Municipality: Bohinj
- Elevation: 547.1 m (1,795 ft)

Population (2020)
  - Total: 565

Stara Fužina (pronounced [ˈstaːɾa fuˈʒiːna]) is a settlement in the Municipality of Bohinj in the Upper Carniola region of Slovenia.

The northern tip of the village is located at Slovenia's highest peak, Triglav, and forms a tripoint with Trenta and Mojstrana settlements. The south of the village is located on the northern and eastern coast of Lake Bohinj.

== Name ==
The name Stara Fužina literally means 'old foundry, old forge'. Like other places with similar names (e.g., Fužina, Fužine, and Fusine in Valromana), the name refers to ironworking in the past. The Slovene common noun fužina is borrowed from Friulian or Venetian Italian fusina, cognate with standard Italian fucina 'foundry, forge'.

== Church ==
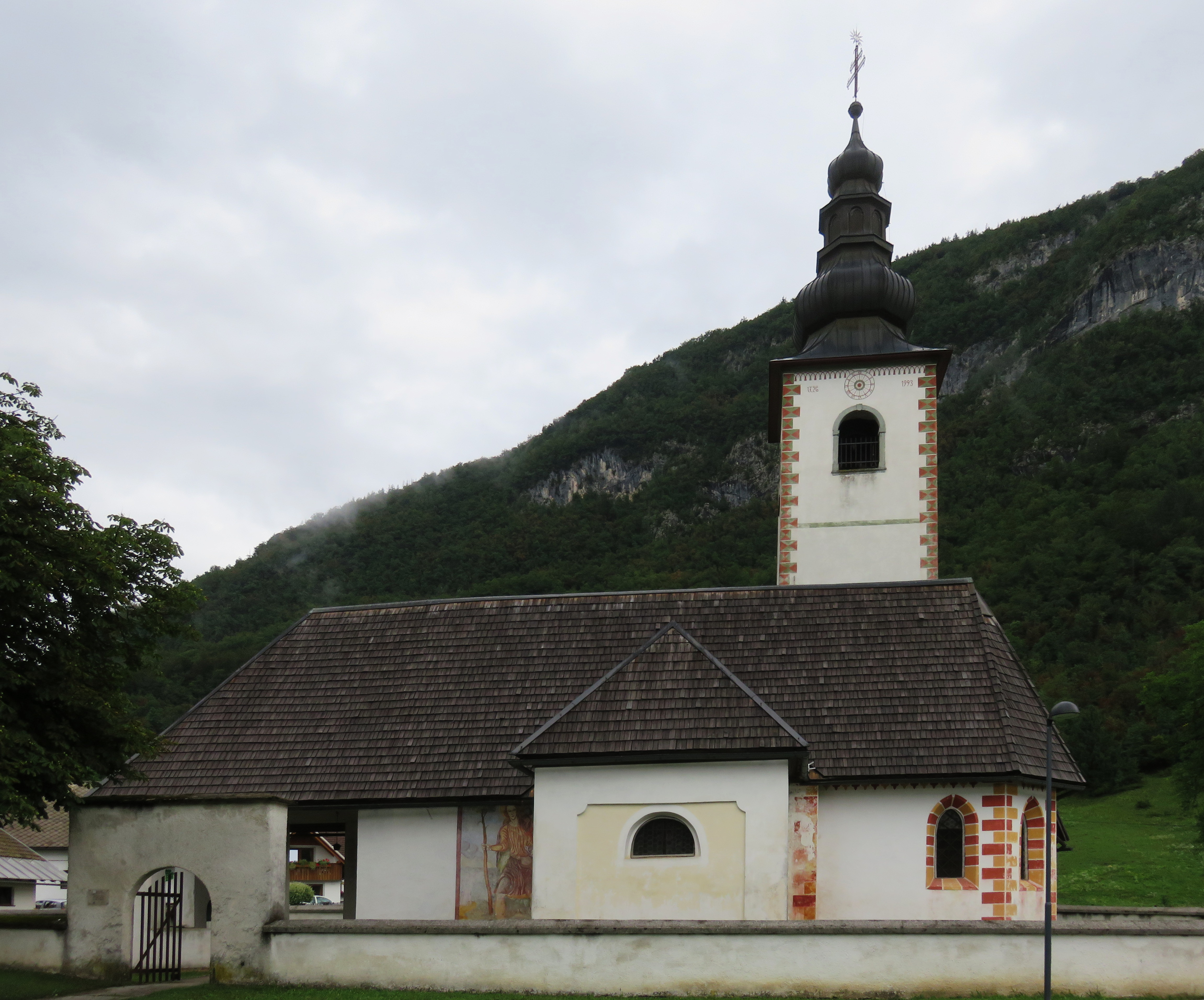
Saint Paul's Church

The medieval church on the outskirts of the village is dedicated to Saint Paul.
