= Koprivnik v Bohinju =

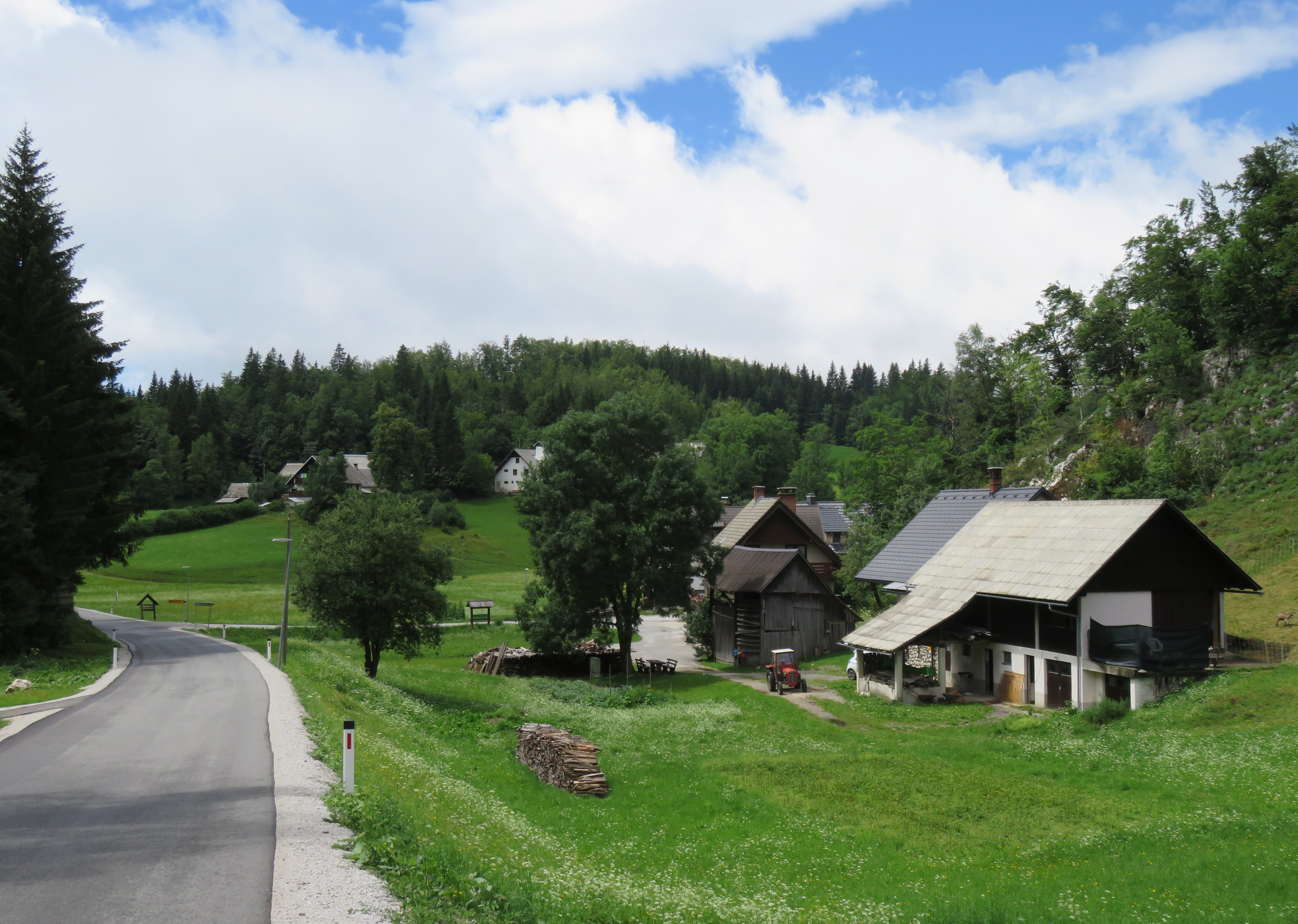

- Location in Slovenia
- Coordinates: 46°18′20.94″N 13°59′0.51″E
- Country: Slovenia
- Traditional region: Upper Carniola
- Statistical region: Upper Carniola
- Municipality: Bohinj
- Elevation: 973.7 m (3,195 ft)

Population (2025)
  - Total: 244

Koprivnik v Bohinju (pronounced [kɔˈpɾíːwnik w bɔˈxíːnju]) is a settlement on the Pokljuka Plateau in the Municipality of Bohinj in the Upper Carniola region of Slovenia.

== Name ==
The name of the settlement was changed from Koprivnik to Koprivnik v Bohinju (literally, 'Koprivnik in Bohinj') in 1955 to distinguish it from other settlements with the same name in Slovenia.

== Church ==
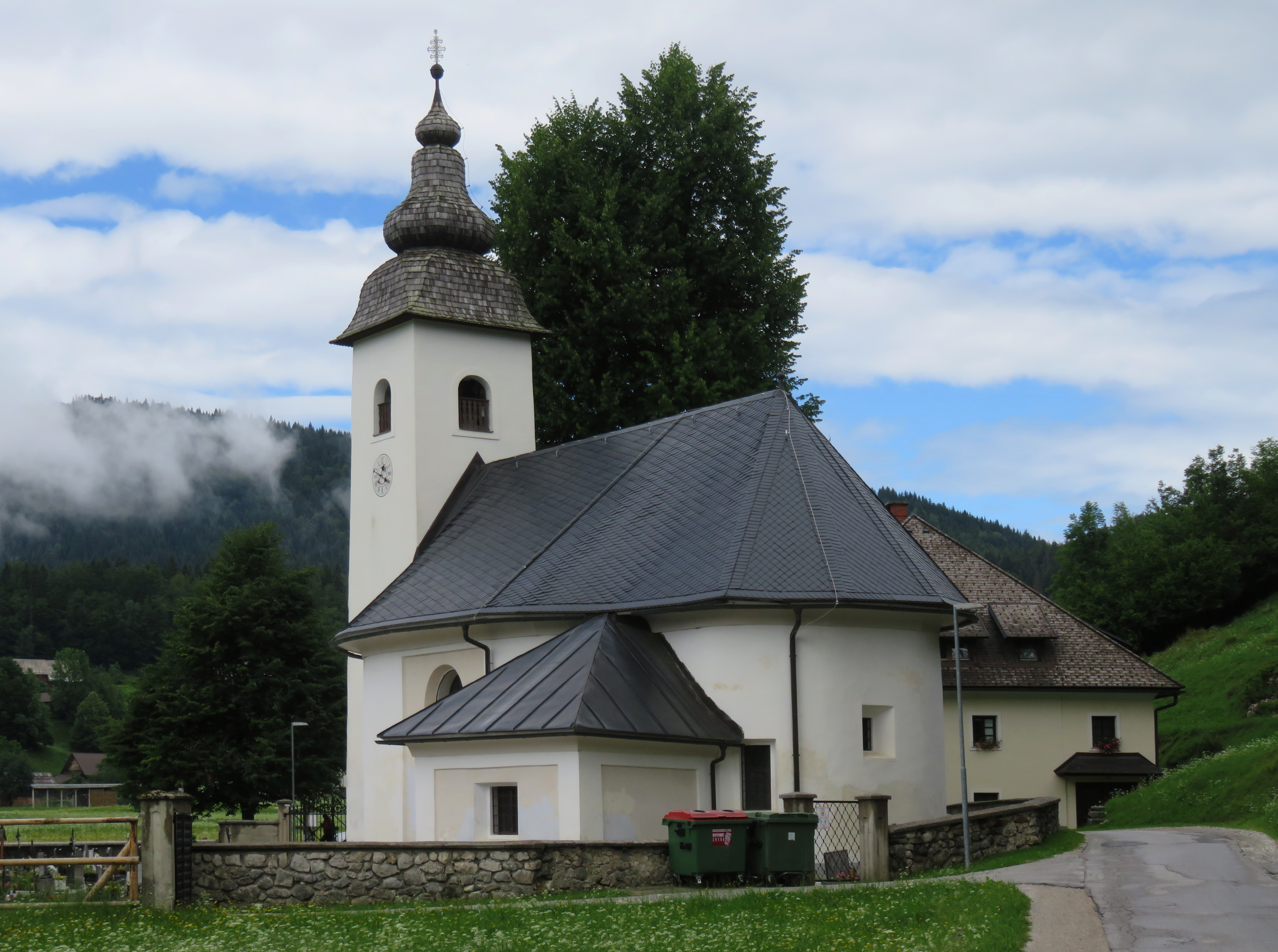
Holy Cross Church

The local church is dedicated to the Exaltation of the Holy Cross.
