= Lake Bohinj =

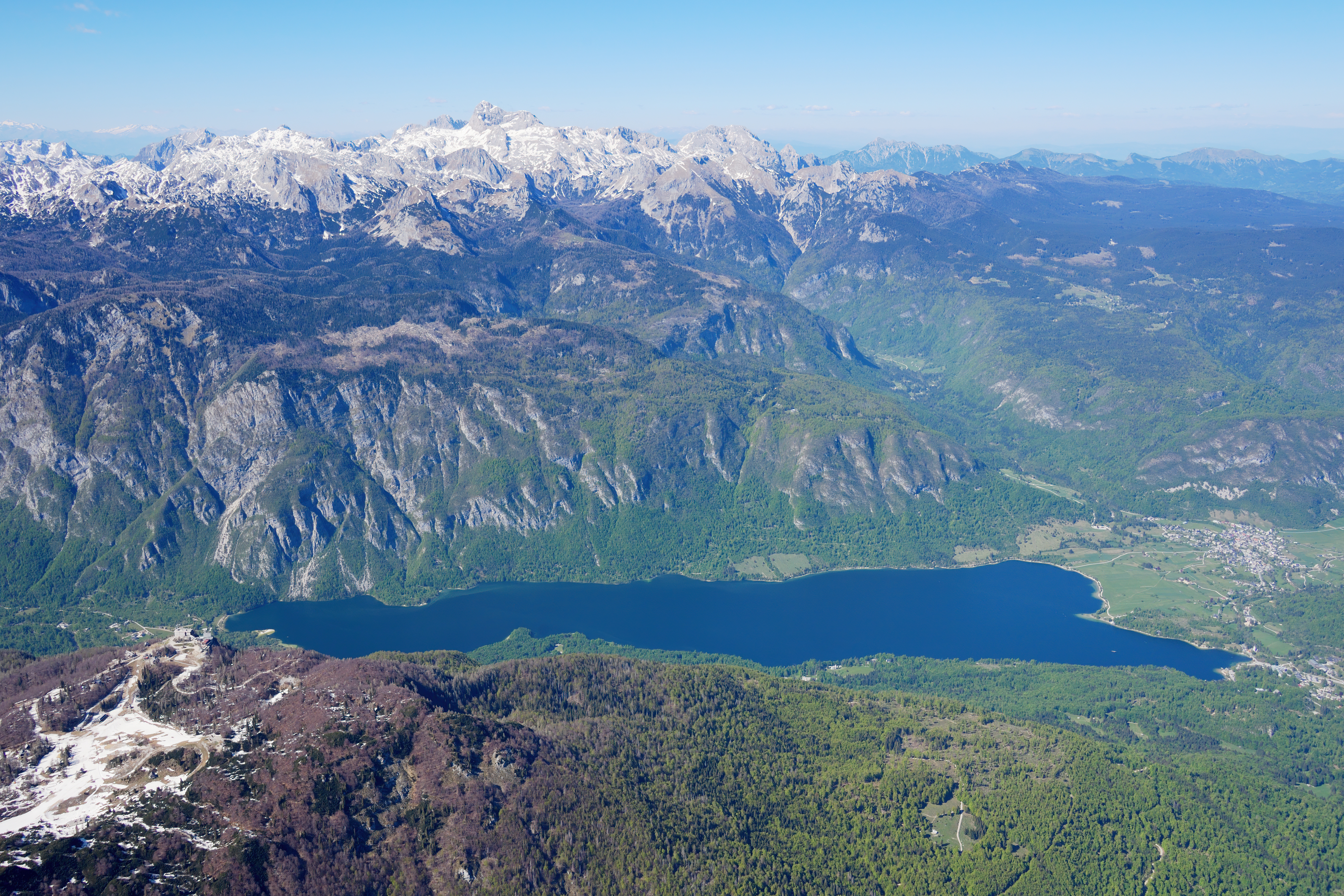
- Aerial view of Lake Bohinj with Triglav in the background

- Location within Slovenia
- Location: Municipality of Bohinj, Triglav National Park
- Coordinates: 46°16′56.31″N 13°51′29.6″E
- Type: Glacial lake
- Primary inflows: Savica
- Primary outflows: Sava Bohinjka
- Catchment area: 107 km^{2} (41 mi^{2})
- Basin countries: Slovenia
- Max. length: 4.35 km (2.70 mi)
- Max. width: 1 km (0.62 mi)
- Surface area: 3.18 km^{2} (1.23 mi^{2})
- Average depth: 30 m (98 ft)
- Max. depth: 45 m (148 ft)
- Water volume: 99.7×10^{6} m^{3} (80,800 acre⋅ft)
- Residence time: 0.3 to 0.5 years
- Surface elevation: 526 m (1,726 ft)

Lake Bohinj (Slovene: Bohinjsko jezero), covering 318 hectares (790 acres), is the largest permanent lake in Slovenia. (Note: Lake Cerknica, an intermittent lake, is larger than Lake Bohinj during its flood seasons, but disappears entirely during dry seasons.) It is located within the Bohinj Valley of the Julian Alps, in the northwestern Upper Carniola region, and part of Triglav National Park.

== Geography ==
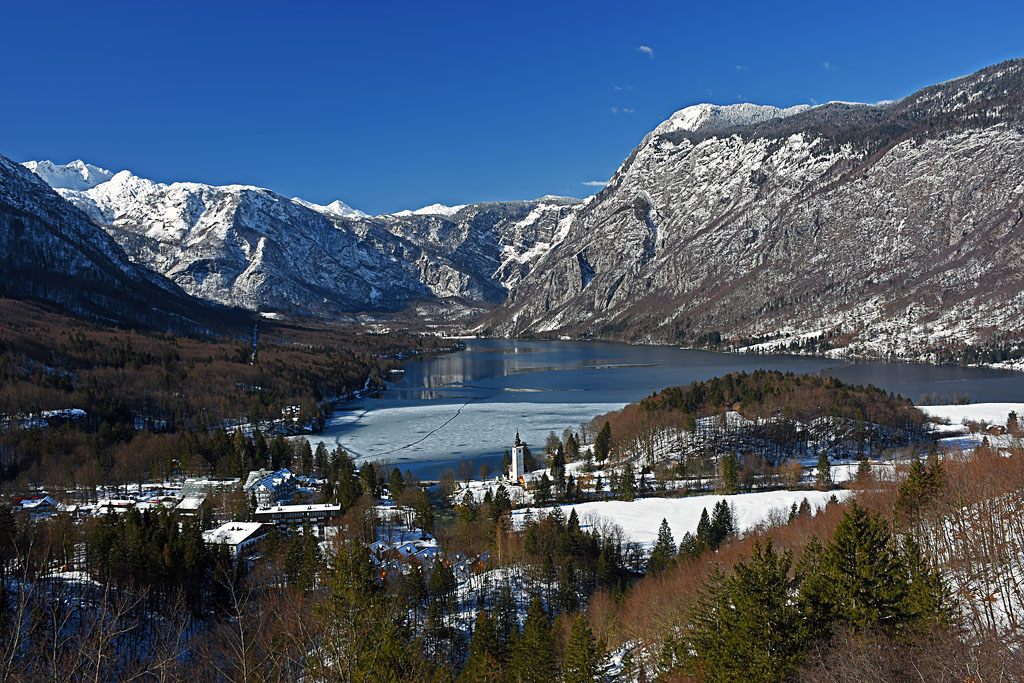
Lake Bohinj

Lake Bohinj is 4.2 km (2.6 mi) long and 1 km (0.62 mi) at its maximum width. It is a glacial lake dammed by a moraine. The largest of the streams that flow into the lake, the Savica ('little Sava'), is fed from Črno jezero (Black Lake), the lowest-lying lake in the Triglav Lakes Valley. The outflow at the eastern end is the Jezernica creek which merges with the Mostnica to form the Sava Bohinjka, which in turn becomes the larger Sava River at the confluence with the Sava Dolinka. As found out already by Belsazar Hacquet in the 18th century, much more water leaves Lake Bohinj than enters it, which is explained with subterranean sources of water.

The clear waters of the lake are the habitat of brown trout, burbot, European chub, common minnow and Arctic char, eight genera of molluscs, as well as of numerous algae species. It is a popular day trippers' destination for swimming and other water sports. On the shore is a statue of the legendary Goldhorn (Zlatorog) chamois, whose story was perpetuated by the poet Rudolf Baumbach.
