= Nomenj =

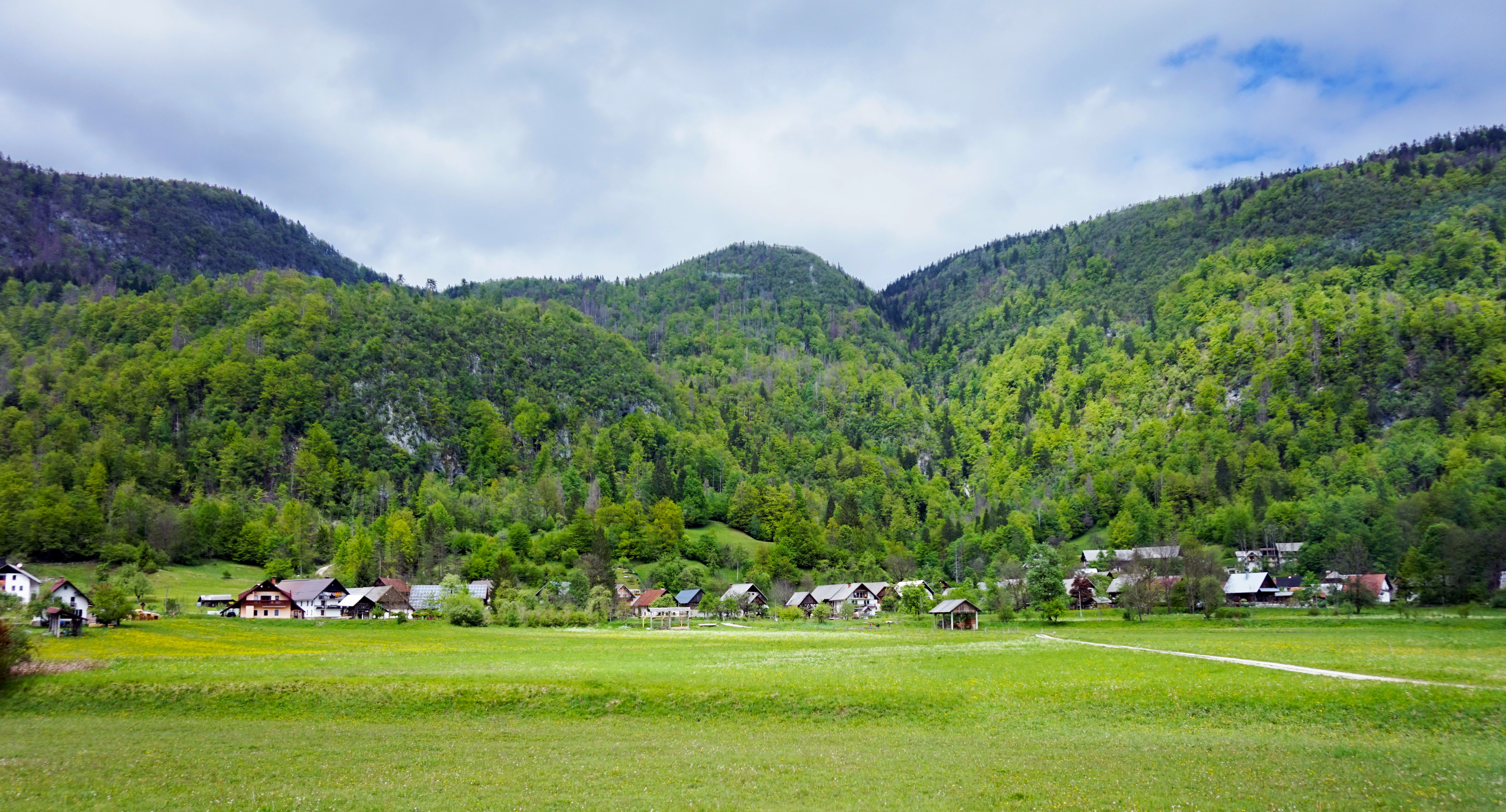

- Location in Slovenia
- Coordinates: 46°17′32.75″N 14°0′22.23″E
- Country: Slovenia
- Traditional region: Upper Carniola
- Statistical region: Upper Carniola
- Municipality: Bohinj
- Elevation: 497.2 m (1,631 ft)

Population (2020)
  - Total: 159

Nomenj (pronounced [ˈnɔːmɛn], German: Neuming) is a settlement in the Municipality of Bohinj in the Upper Carniola region of Slovenia.
