= Jereka =

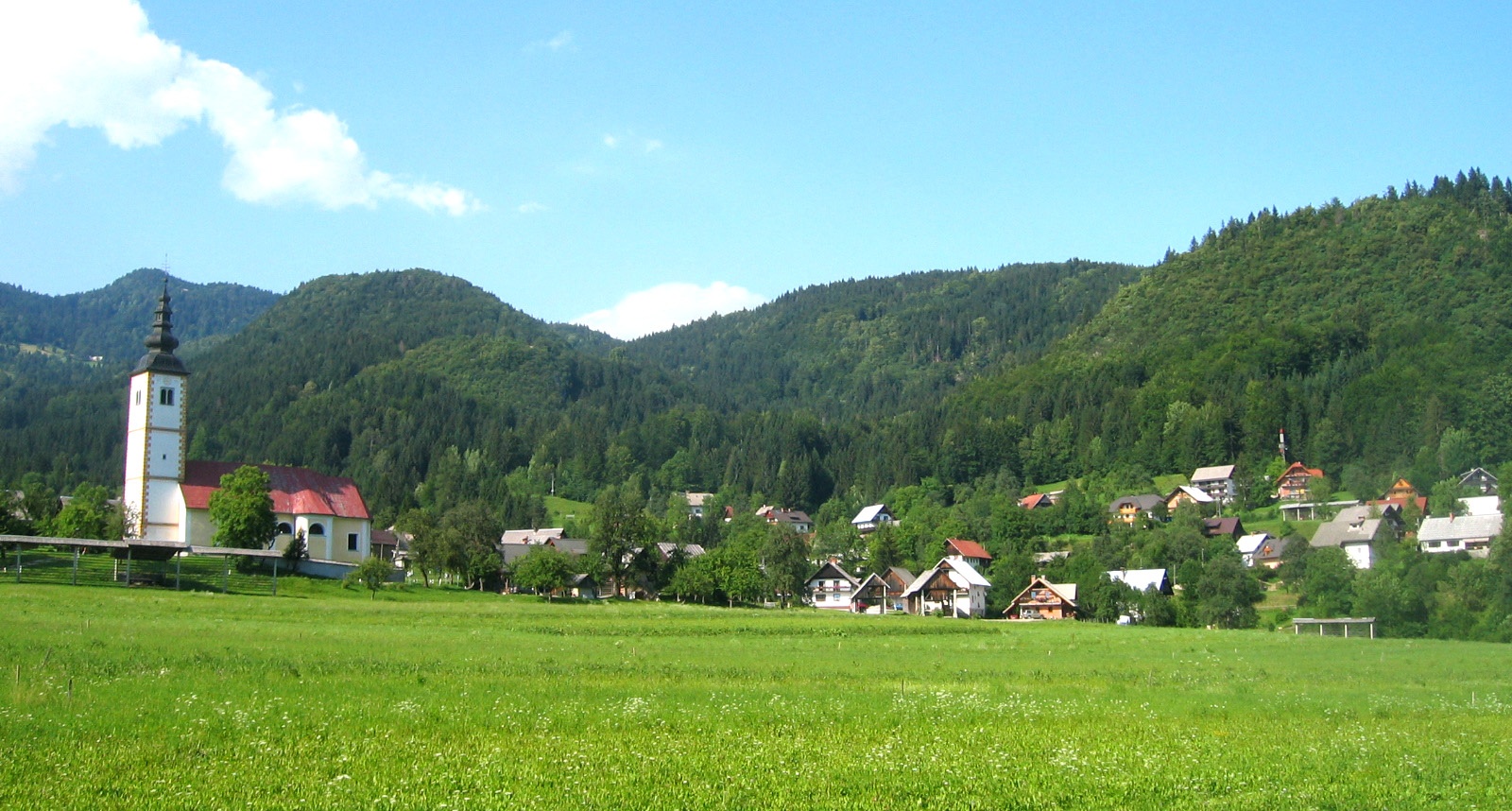
- Jereka

- Location in Slovenia
- Coordinates: 46°17′44.32″N 13°57′45.49″E
- Country: Slovenia
- Traditional region: Upper Carniola
- Statistical region: Upper Carniola
- Municipality: Bohinj
- Elevation: 615 m (2,018 ft)

Population (2020)
  - Total: 194

Jereka (pronounced [jɛˈɾeːka]) is a settlement in the Municipality of Bohinj in the Upper Carniola region of Slovenia.

== Name ==
Jereka was attested in historical sources as Margrethen kirchen (referring to the church) in 1494, and as Reka in 1763–1787. The name is considered to be of substrate origin, related to the Friulian place name Dierica. It is hypothesized that it comes from the proto-Romance root *karrā 'oak'. Another possibility is that it is originally a hydronym (from reka 'river') with the limiting prefix je- attached to it.

== Church ==
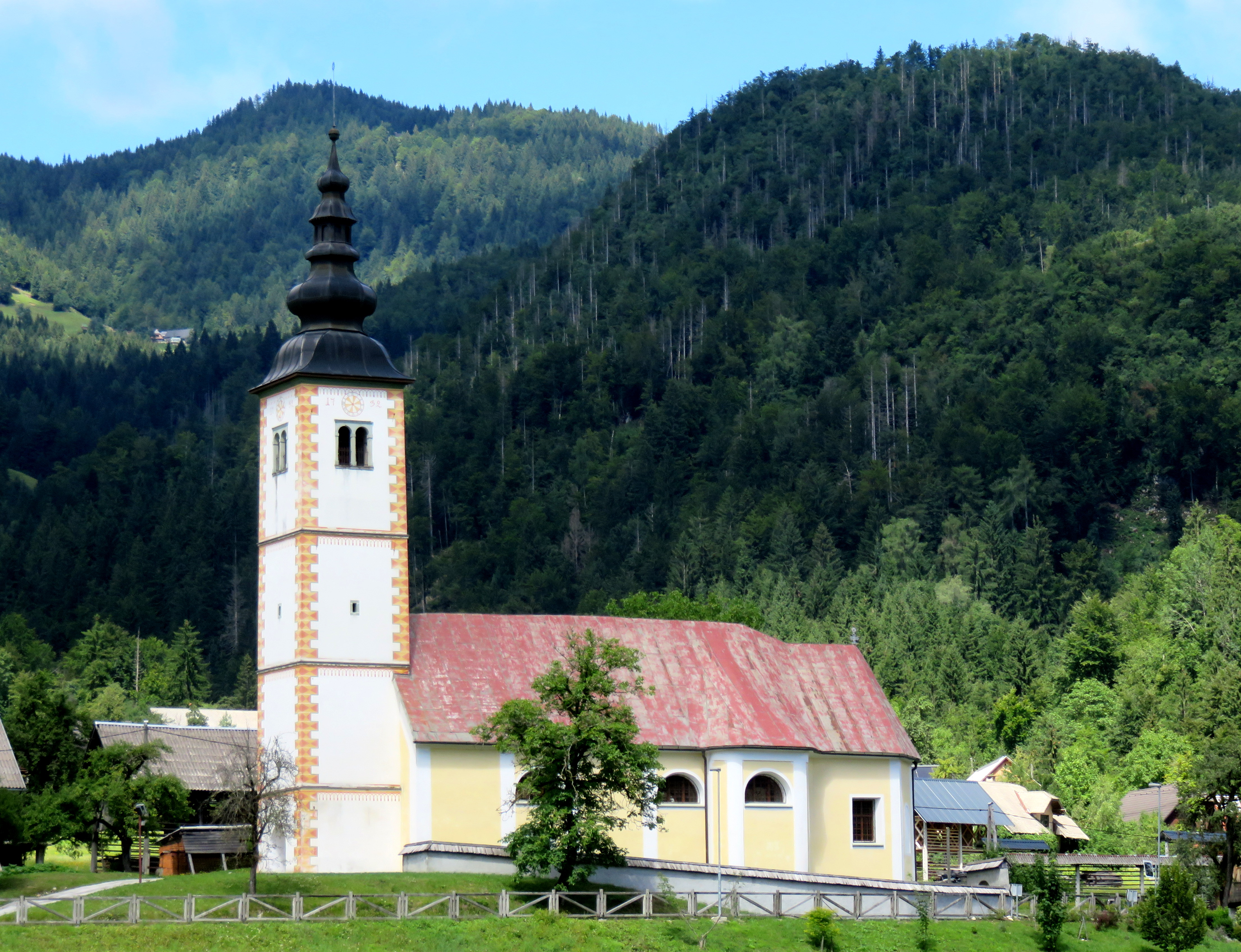
Saint Margaret's Church

The local church is dedicated to Saint Margaret.
