= Municipality of Bohinj =

Municipality of Slovenia

Municipality of Bohinj Občina Bohinj
- Municipality
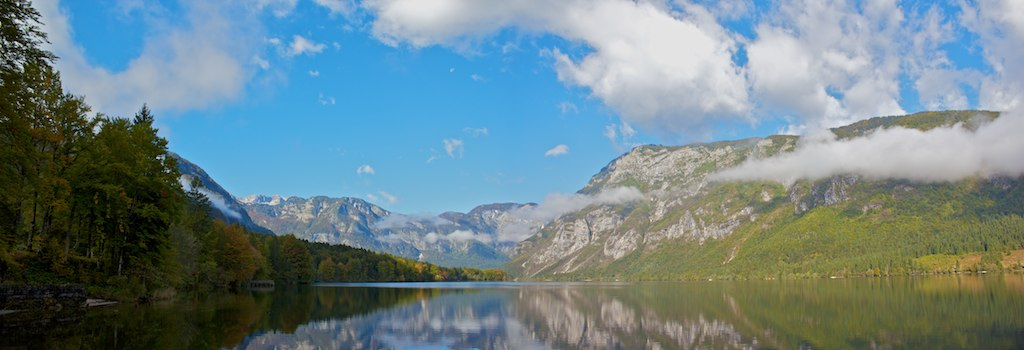

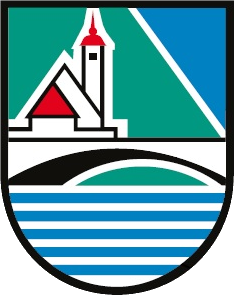
- Flag Coat of arms

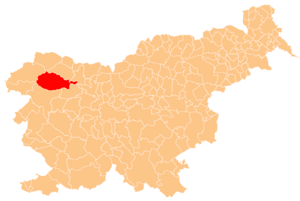
- Location of the Municipality of Bohinj in Slovenia
- Coordinates: 46°18′N 13°55′E
- Country: Slovenia

Government
  - Mayor: Jože Sodja (Independent)

Area
  - Total: 333.7 km^{2} (128.8 sq mi)
- Elevation: 585 m (1,919 ft)

Population (2023)
  - Total: 5,260
  - Density: 16/km^{2} (41/sq mi)
- Time zone: UTC+01 (CET)
  - Summer (DST): UTC+02 (CEST)
- Postal code: 5611
- Vehicle registration: KR
- Website: bohinj.si

The Municipality of Bohinj (Slovene: Občina Bohinj) is a municipality in the Upper Carniola region of northwest Slovenia. Its seat is the settlement of Bohinjska Bistrica. The municipality had 5,256 people in 2023. As of July 2023, the mean age of people was 46.0 years. In the school year 2023/24 elementary schools in Bohinj were attended by about 440 pupils, while various upper secondary schools were attended by about 200 pupils. For every 179 people aged 65 or older, 100 people were aged 0-14. However, the number of live births was lower than the number of deaths, which means that natural increase per 1,000 population in the municipality was negative (-1.5 in Bohinj).

== Settlements ==
In addition to the municipal seat of Bohinjska Bistrica, the municipality includes the following settlements:

- Bitnje
- Bohinjska Češnjica
- Brod
- Goreljek
- Gorjuše
- Jereka
- Kamnje
- Koprivnik v Bohinju
- Laški Rovt
- Lepence
- Log v Bohinju
- Nemški Rovt
- Nomenj
- Podjelje
- Polje
- Ravne v Bohinju
- Ribčev Laz
- Savica
- Srednja Vas v Bohinju
- Stara Fužina
- Studor v Bohinju
- Ukanc
- Žlan
