= Sava Bohinjka =

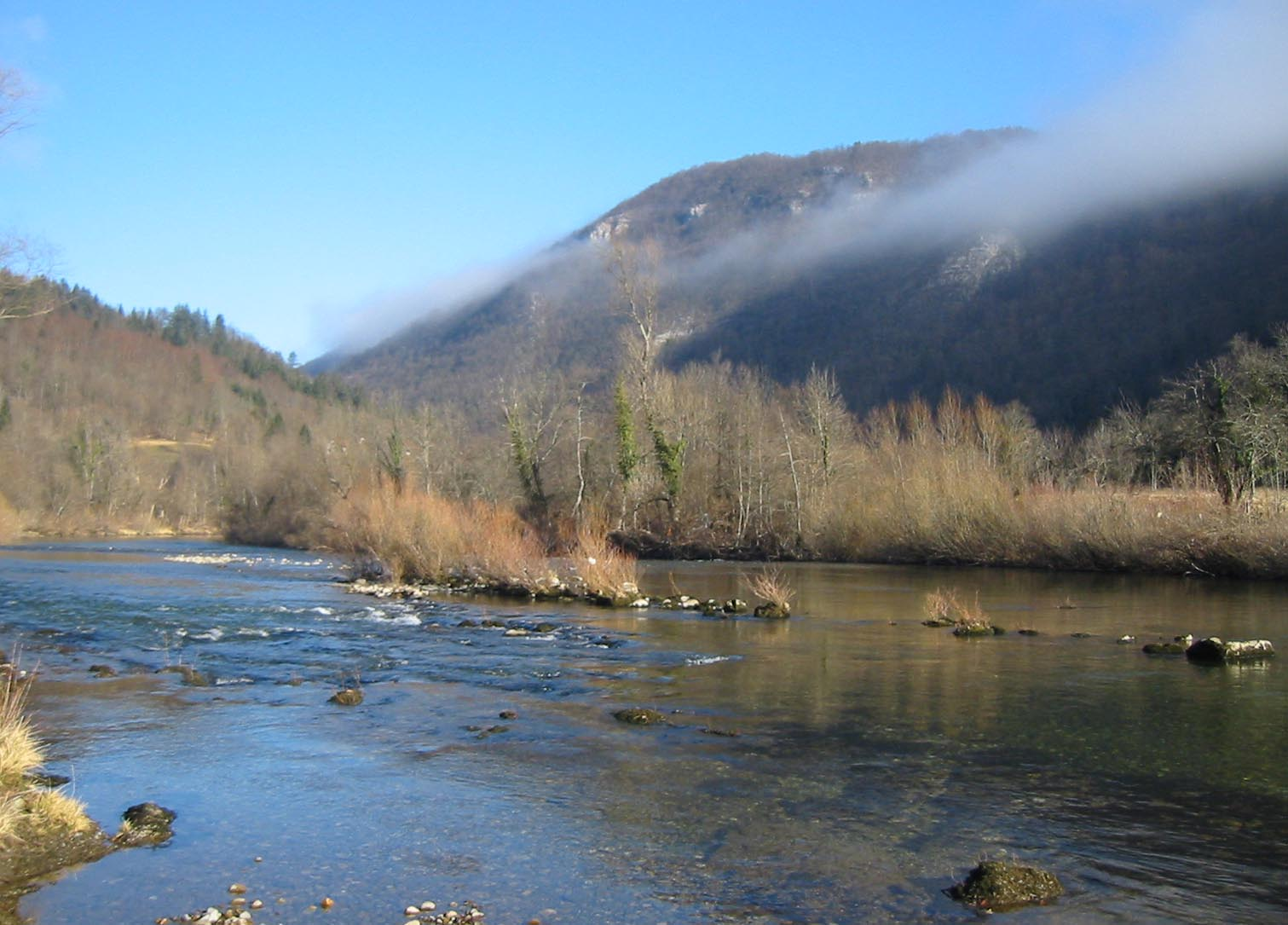

Location
- Country: Slovenia

Physical characteristics
- Mouth
  - location: Sava
  - coordinates: 46.3442°N 14.1553°E
- Length: 41 km (25 mi)
- Basin size: 388 km^{2} (150 sq mi)

Basin features
- Progression: Sava→ Danube→ Black Sea

The Sava Bohinjka is a headwater of the Sava River in northwestern Slovenia. At 41 kilometres (25 mi) in length, it is the shorter of the two headwaters that become the Sava River in the town of Radovljica, the other being the 45 km (28 mi)-long Sava Dolinka.

== Course ==
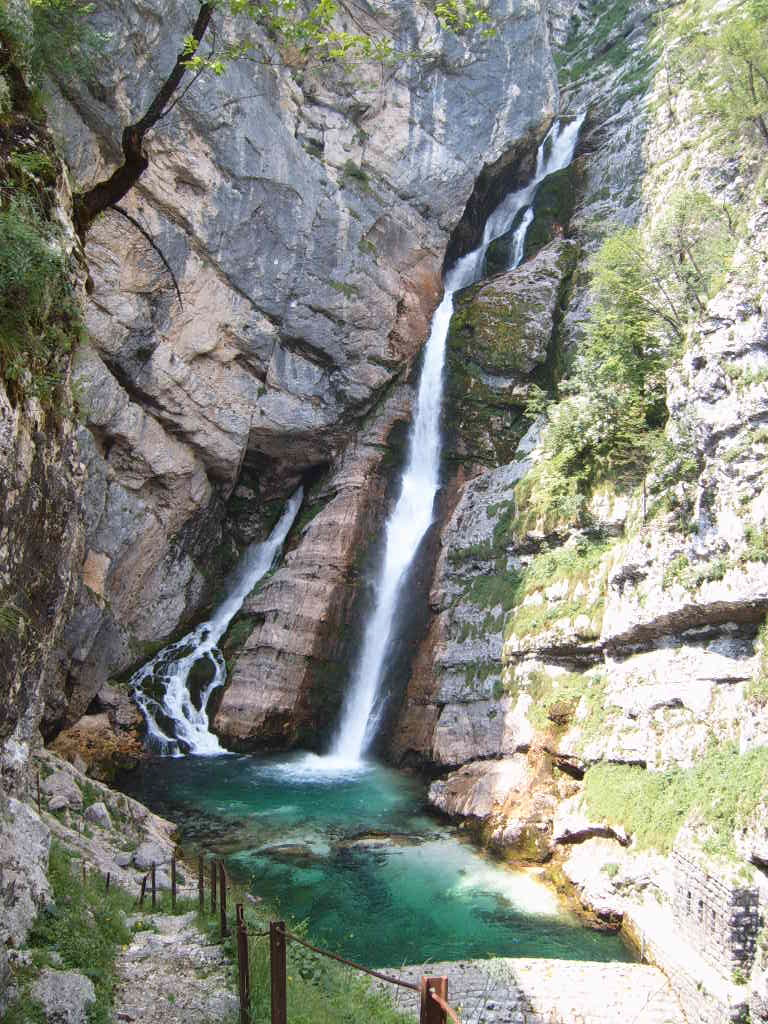
Savica Falls with two streams forming the letter A

The Sava Bohinjka originates under the Komarča Crag at an elevation of 805 m (2,641 ft), from springs fed by the Triglav Lakes Valley. Until it reaches Lake Bohinj, the river is known as the Savica ('little Sava'), and features the 60 m (200 ft)-high Savica Falls (Slovene: slap Savica) at its source. It then flows through the Ukanc Gorge, where the 3 MW Savica power plant is located, before flowing into Lake Bohinj, where it creates a small delta. It flows from Lake Bohinj as the Sava Bohinjka through Bohinjska Bistrica, Bohinjska Bela, and close to Lake Bled, before meeting the Sava Dolinka near Radovljica.
