= Ljubljana Matica Alpine Club =

Slovenian alpine club

The Ljubljana Matica Alpine Club (Slovene: Planinsko društvo Ljubljana-Matica, shortly PD Ljubljana-Matica or simply Matica), with its office located in Ljubljana, is by the number of members the largest Alpine club in Slovenia. In 2013, the club had about 2,800 members. It is a member of the Alpine Association of Slovenia. The current president of the club is Tomaž Willenpart.

Sections of the club are involved in hillwalking, mountaineering, mountain biking, hike guiding and mountain guiding, mountain rescue, maintenance of trails, youth education, publishing and the conservation of the mountain environment. The club operates the following mountain shelters: the Triglav Lodge at Kredarica, the Triglav Lakes Lodge, the Savica Lodge, the Kamnik Bistrica Lodge, the Komna Lodge, and the Mali Podi Shelter below Mt. Skuta.

The year of establishment of the club is disputed. According to the club, it was established in 1893 along with the Slovene Alpine Club (Slovensko planinsko društvo; SPD), under the name Central SPD Club (Osrednje društvo SPD), and it served as the parent club (matica) for the establishment of other Alpine clubs throughout the Slovene lands. Outside experts contend that the Central SPD Club was established only in 1937, and that the current club has no legal continuity with it and was established later, only on 12 December 1945. The first regular assembly of the club was held on 24 February 1946 in the hall of the Matica Cinema in Ljubljana.
