= Jôf di Miezegnot =

Mountain in Italy

- Poldnašnja špica (Slovenian)
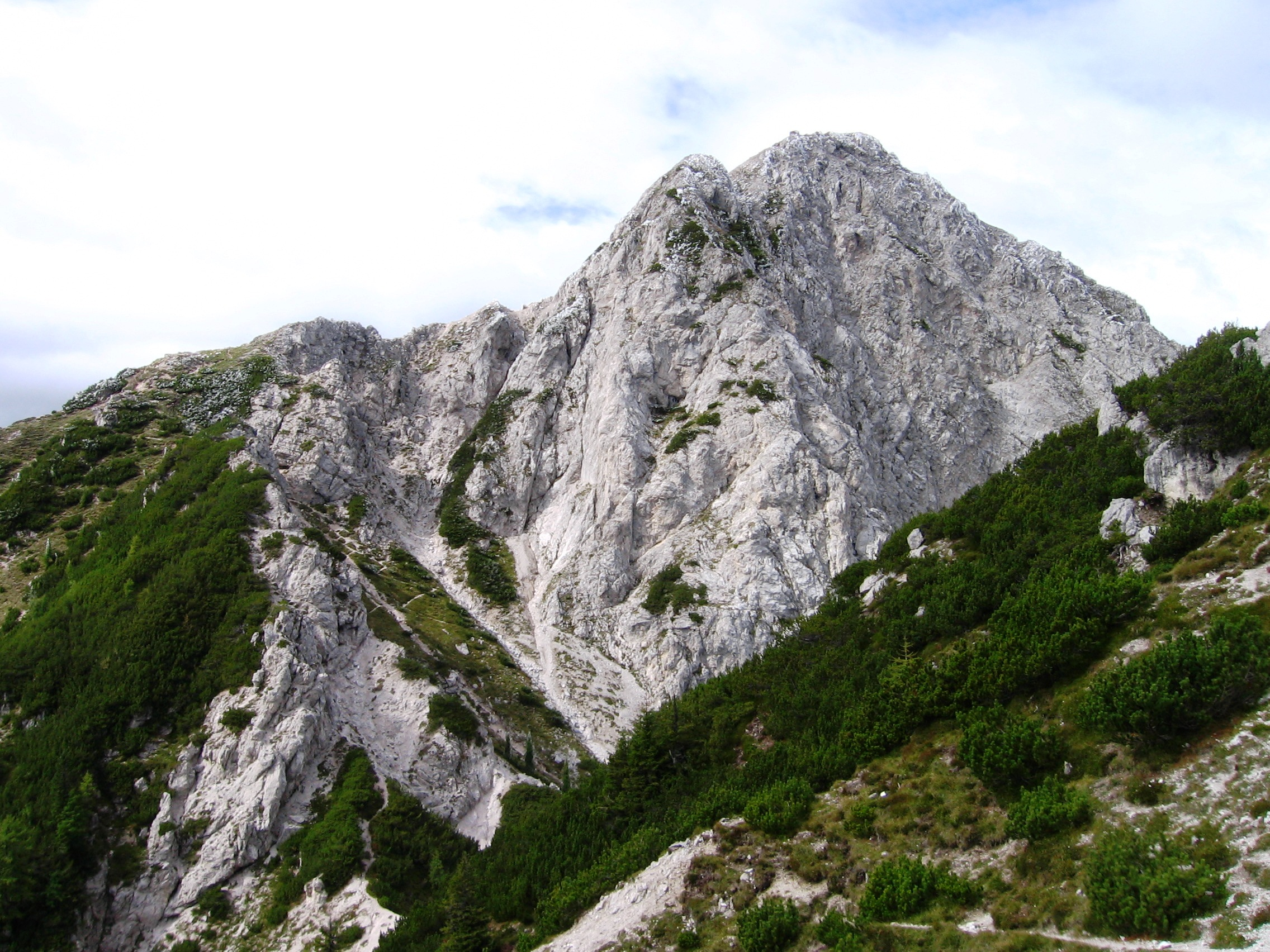
- Jôf di Miezegnot

Highest point
- Elevation: 2,087 m (6,847 ft)
- Coordinates: 46°28′36″N 13°27′13″E

Geography
- Location within Alps
- Location: Friuli-Venezia Giulia, Italy
- Parent range: Julian Alps

Jôf di Miezegnot (Slovene: Poldnašnja špica, German: Malborgether Mittagskofel) is a 2,087-metre (6,847 ft) high mountain of the Western Julian Alps located in the Province of Udine, Italy.

== Characteristics ==
The peak is part of the Malborghetto mountains, and lies close to Italy's borders with Austria and Slovenia. Its summit offers a panorama of Jôf di Montasio, Kanin and Jôf Fuart. The eastern mountains of the Carnic Alps are visible.

Jôf di Miezegnot was the site of fierce fighting between Italy and Austria-Hungary during the First World War. The entire ridge represented the defence line of the Italian army, with the summit itself held by the Italians, while the Austro-Hungarian soldiers held the northern slopes nearby. The mountain hosts the remains of several structures from this period, in particular a village built by the Gemona Alpini Battalion in 1915. Most of the village is ruined but its former chapel has been preserved as an alpine bothy for mountaineers.
