= Black Lake (Triglav Lakes Valley) =

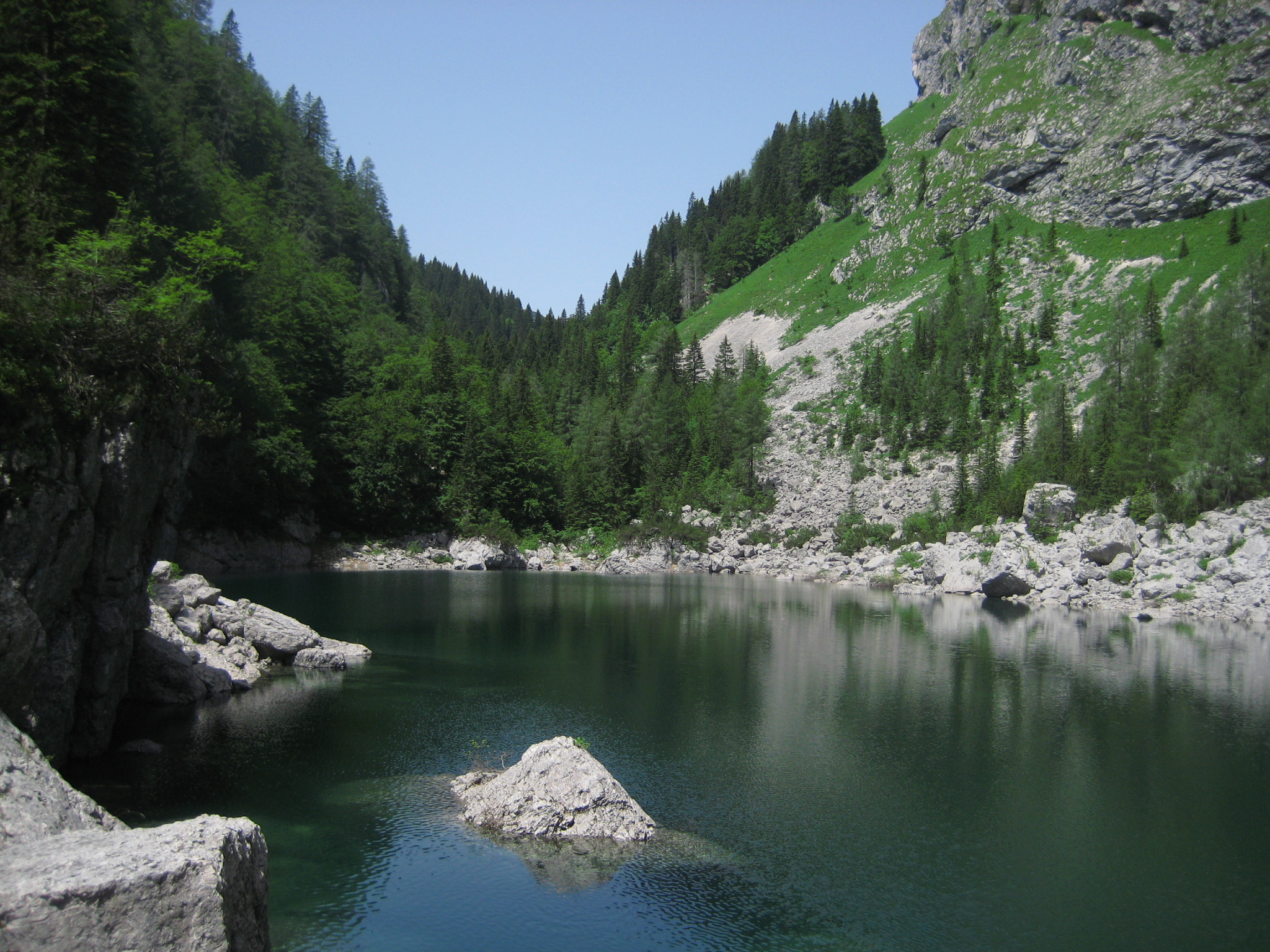
- Black Lake (Črno jezero)

- Location within Slovenia
- Location: Triglav Lakes Valley, Julian Alps in Slovenia
- Coordinates: 46.298641°N 13.795618°E
- Type: Lake
- Max. length: 150 metres (490 ft)
- Max. width: 80 metres (260 ft)
- Max. depth: 6 metres (20 ft)
- Surface elevation: 1,319 metres (4,327 ft)

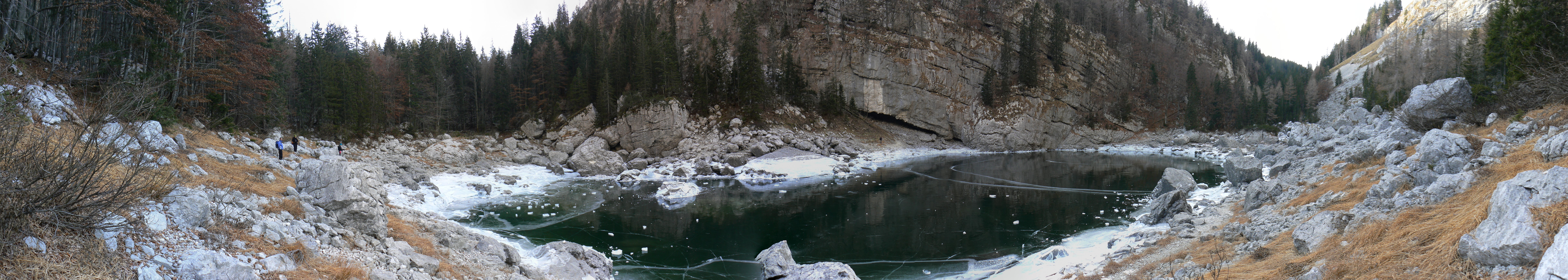
Black Lake may freeze in winter.

Black Lake (Slovene: Črno jezero) (1,319 metres or 4,327 feet) is the lowest-lying lake in the Triglav Lakes Valley, part of the Julian Alps in Slovenia. It is named for its location in a basin in the middle of the forest, which stretches right to the edge of the Komarča rock face. Because of its relatively low elevation, it is the warmest of the Triglav Lakes. At the surface, its temperature in summer is 9 °C (48 °F), whereas in winter it is 3 °C (37 °F). It is 150 m (490 ft) long, 80 m (260 ft) wide, and up to 6 m (20 ft) deep. The Alpine Newt (Ichthyosaura alpestris), endemic to the Alps, lives in it.
