= Komna =

Mountain karst plateau in the Julian Alps, Slovenia

Coordinates: 46°17′4.06″N 13°46′24.17″E

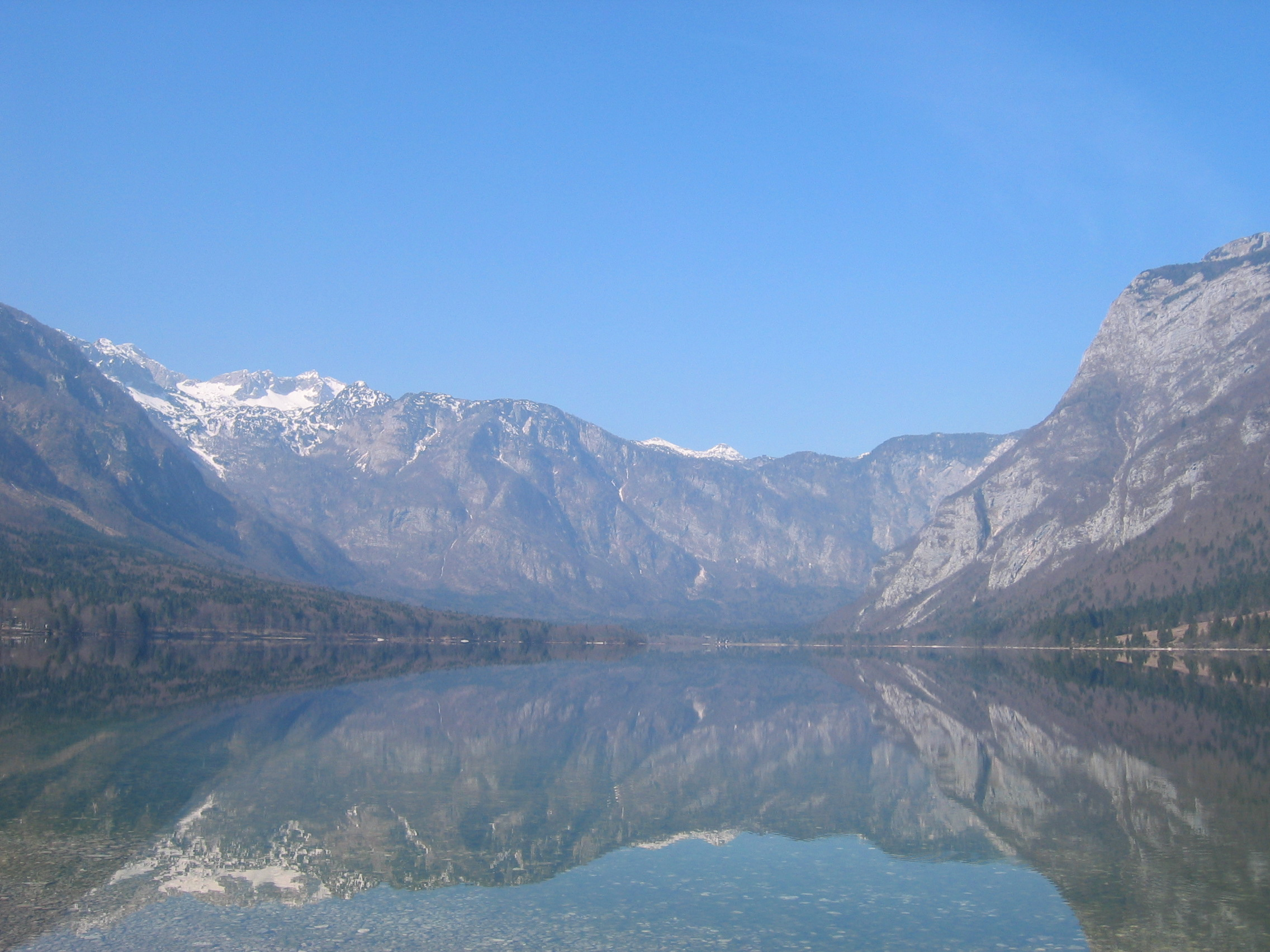
The Komna Plateau rises west of Lake Bohinj.

Komna is a mountain karst plateau in the Julian Alps in northwestern Slovenia. It has an elevation from 1,300 metres (4,300 ft) to 1,750 metres (5,740 ft). It has a triangular shape and rises above the Bohinj Basin. To the east, it continues into the Triglav Lakes Valley. The lowest measured temperature in Slovenia was recorded at Komna on 9 January 2009: −49 °C (−56 °F).

== Name ==
The name Komna is derived through ellipsis from *Komьna (planota); the adjective *komьna comes from the Slavic common noun *komъ 'hill, mountain, elevation', and the second element means 'plateau'. The name therefore etymologically means 'mountain (plateau)'.

== Lodge ==
The Komna Lodge stands on Komna at an elevation of 1,520 metres (4,990 ft). It is operated by the Ljubljana Matica Alpine Club.
