= Gandstock =

Mountain in Switzerland

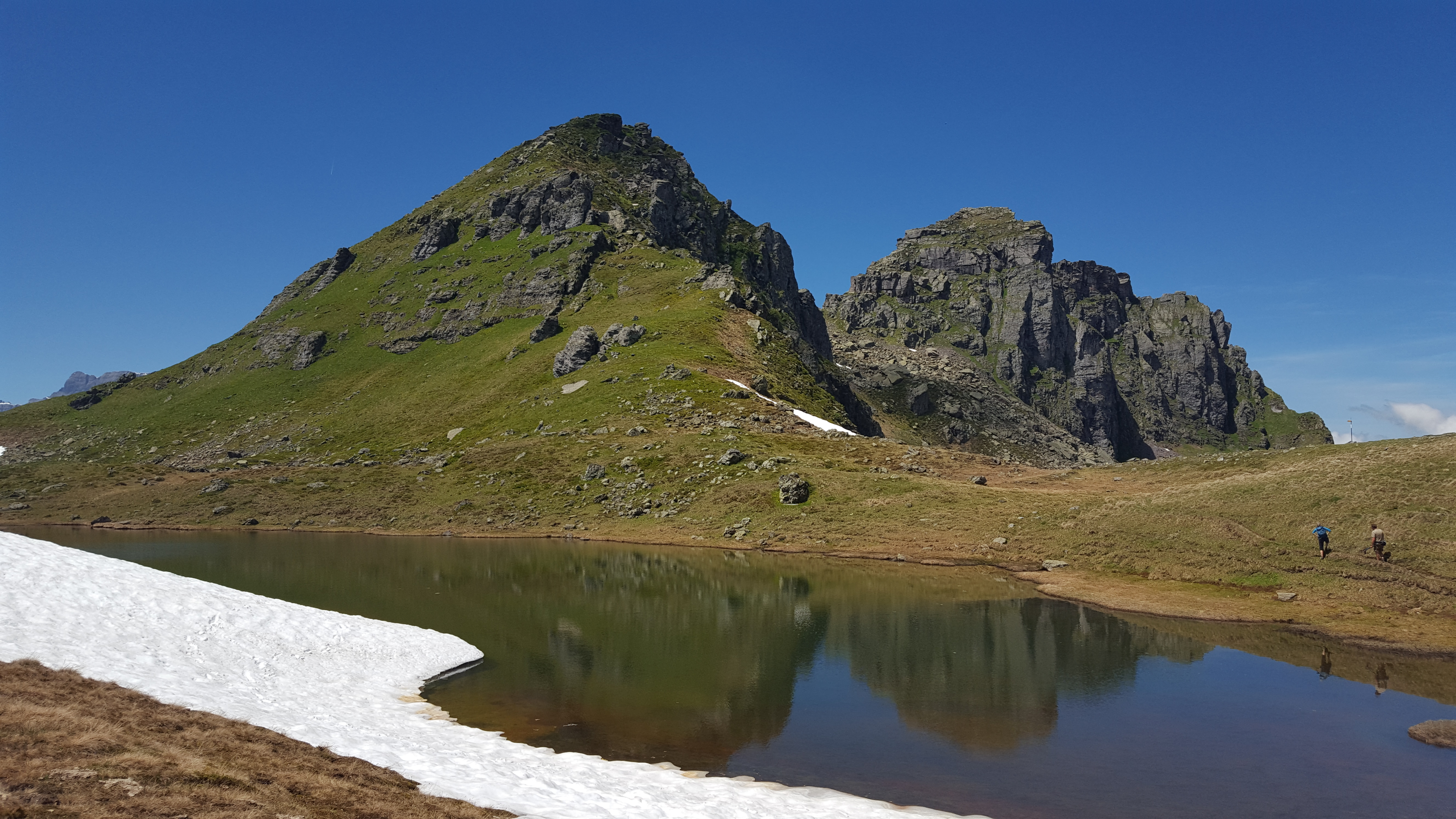
- Berglimattsee with Gandstock

Highest point
- Elevation: 2,315 m (7,595 ft)
- Prominence: 161 m (528 ft)
- Coordinates: 46°55′45″N 9°07′01″E

Geography
- Location within Switzerland Location within Canton of Glarus
- Country: Switzerland
- Canton: Glarus
- Parent range: Glarus Alps

The Gandstock (2,315 m [7,595 ft]) is a mountain of the Glarus Alps, located south-east of Schwanden in the canton of Glarus. It lies at the northern end of the range separating the main Linth valley from the Sernftal, north of the Kärpf.

There is a lake located on its western side, the Garichtisee. Two other nearby lakes are the Berglimattsee and the Chuebodensee.

== See also ==
- List of mountains of the canton of Glarus
