= Kanjavec =

Mountain in Slovenia

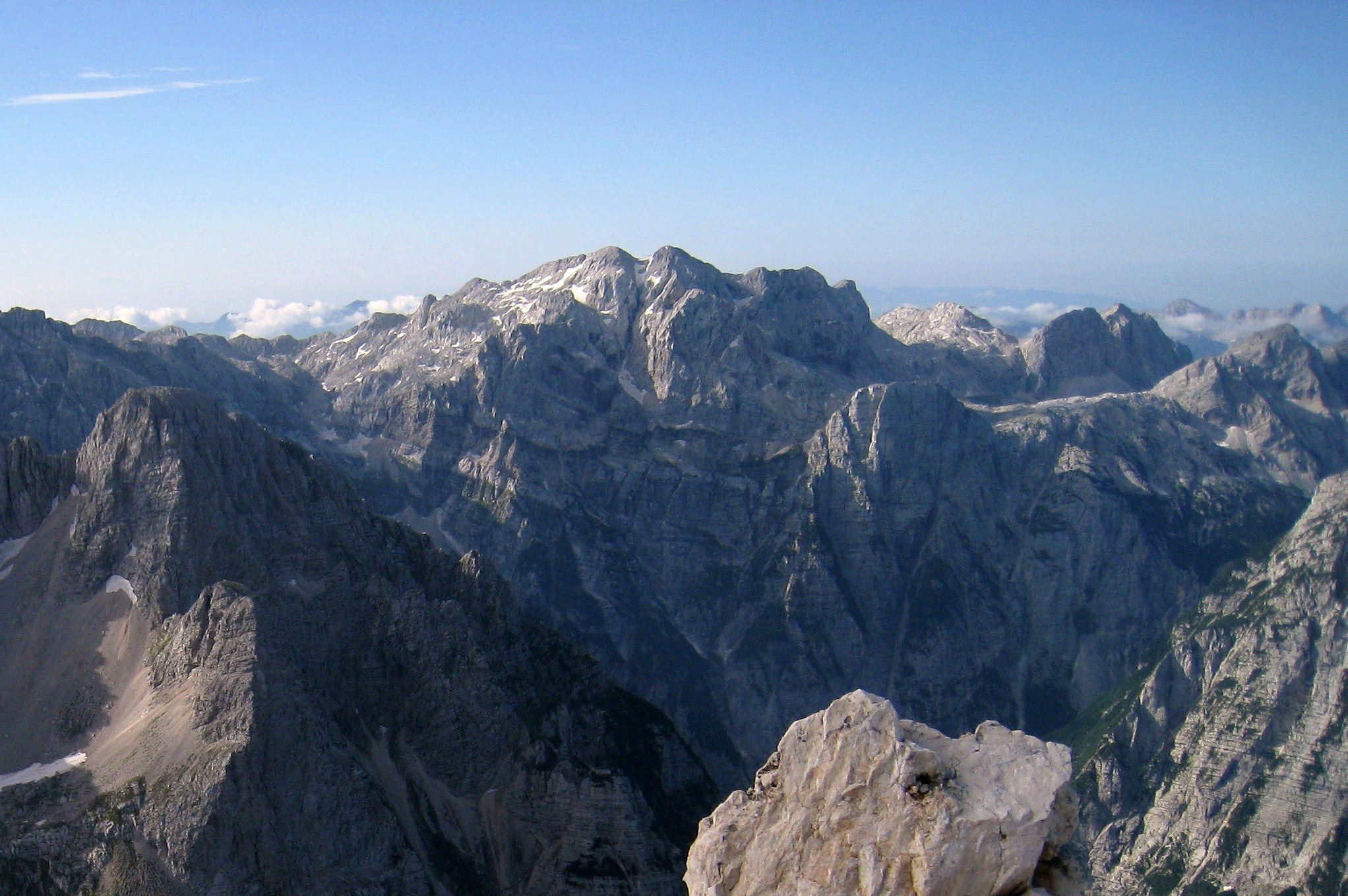
- Kanjavec

Highest point
- Elevation: 2,569 m (8,428 ft)
- Prominence: 438 m (1,437 ft)
- Coordinates: 46°21′36.392″N 13°48′38.578″E

Geography
- Location within Slovenia
- Location: Slovenia
- Parent range: Julian Alps

Kanjavec is a 2,569-metre (8,428 ft) mountain in the center of Triglav National Park. It lies between the Dolič Pass at 2,164 m, the Hribarice Pass at 2,306 m and the Prehodavci Pass at 2071 m. Kanjavec is also a popular ski touring destination. From the summit, there is a panoramic view of the surrounding mountains. It is relatively easy to ascend, with a few exposed areas.

== Starting points ==
- Zadnjica (609 m)
- Blato Mountain Pasture (Slovene: Planina Blato; 1,147 m)
- Savica Lodge (Koča pri Savici; 653 m)

== Routes ==
- 6¼ hrs from Zadnjica, over the Prehodavci Pass
- 6 hrs from Zadnjica, via the Dolič Pass
- 6 hrs Koča pri Savici (1,542 m) via the Triglav Lakes Valley
- 6¼ hrs from Blato Mountain Pasture via Mišelj Peak
- 5¾ hrs from Blato Mountain Pasture via Za Kopico
- 6 hrs from Blato Mountain Pasture over the Krstenica Mountain Pasture (Planina Krstenica)
