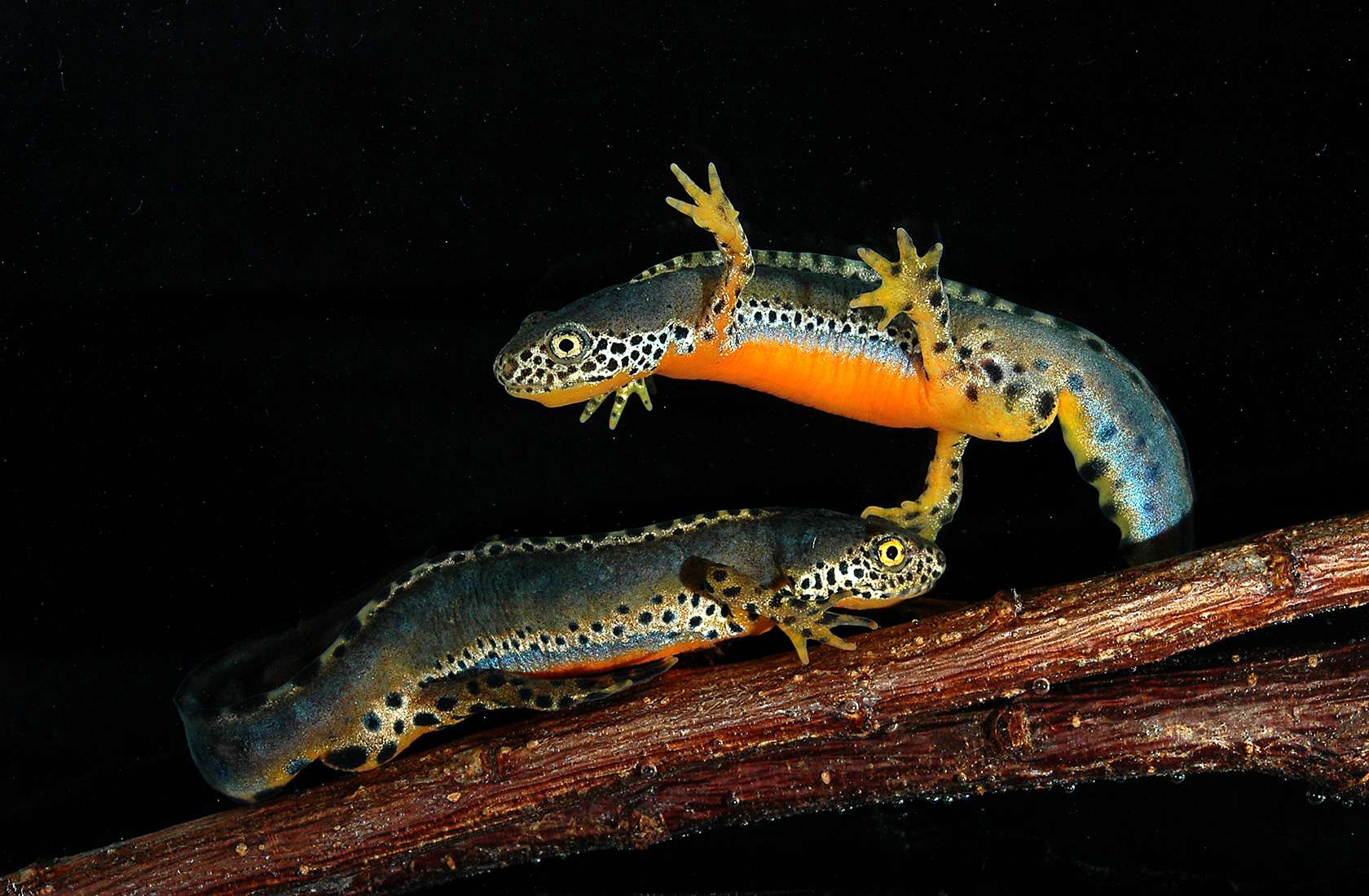
- Alpine newt, two males during mating season

Scientific classification
- Kingdom: Animalia
- Phylum: Chordata
- Class: Amphibia
- Order: Urodela
- Family: Salamandridae
- Subfamily: Pleurodelinae
- Genus: Ichthyosaura; Sonnini de Manoncourt and Latreille, 1801

Species
- I. alpestris (Alpine newt); †I. randeckensis; †I. wintershofi

Synonyms
- Hemitriton (Dugès, 1852); Mesotriton (Bolkay, 1927)

= Ichthyosaura =

Ichthyosaura Temporal range: Early Miocene–recent

Genus of amphibians

Ichthyosaura is a genus of newts in the family Salamandridae, found in Europe. The only extant species is the alpine newt (Ichthyosaura alpestris), although two fossil species are also known.

== Taxonomy ==
"Ichthyosaura", Greek for "fish lizard", refers to a nymph-like creature in classical mythology.

It contains one extant species: the alpine newt (Ichthyosaura alpestris). Two fossil species from the early-mid Miocene of Germany, Ichthyosaura wintershofi and Ichthyosaura randeckensis, have also been referred to this genus, although the assignment of I. randeckensis has been challenged. I. randeckensis is presently tentatively retained in Ichthyosaura.

The alpine newt was long included in Triturus along with most other European newts. As this genus was found to contain several distinct evolutionary lineages, the alpine newt was split off as genus Mesotriton in 2004. However, the name Ichthyosaura was published earlier and is now accepted as the valid genus name for the alpine newt, while Mesotriton is a junior synonym.

== Biology ==
The genus is gonochoric and reproduces sexually.
