= Berglimattsee =

Lake in Glarus, Switzerland

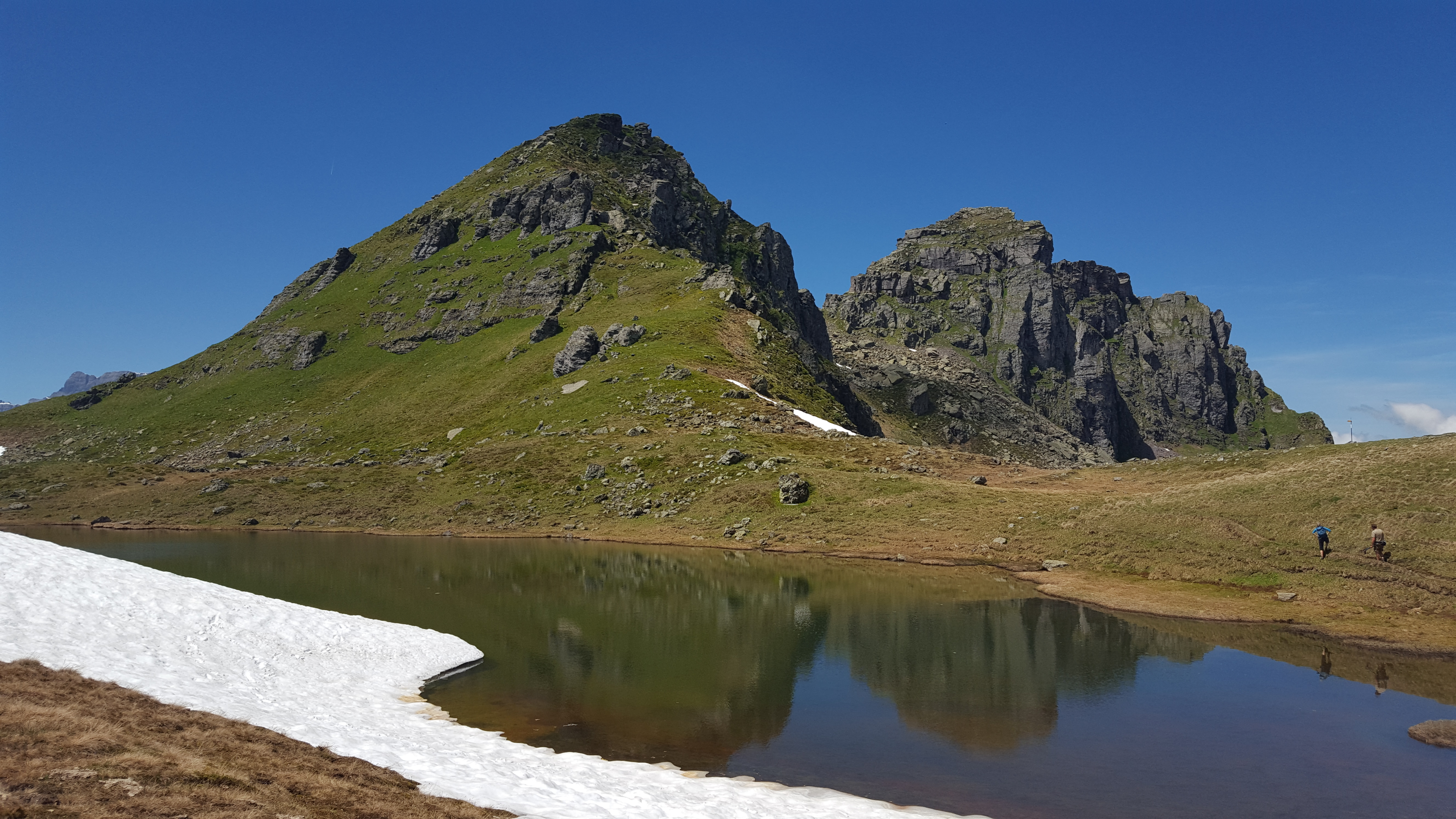
- Berglimattsee and Gandstock

- Location within Canton of Glarus Location within Switzerland Location within Alps
- Interactive map of Berglimattsee
- Location: Glarus Süd, Canton of Glarus
- Coordinates: 46.96059°N 9.12029°E
- Primary outflows: tributary to Niderenbach → Sernf → Linth
- Basin countries: Switzerland
- Surface area: 0.4 ha (0.99 acres)
- Surface elevation: 2,157 m (7,077 ft)

Berglimattsee is a lake in the protected area Freiberg Kärpf on municipal territory of Glarus Süd in the Swiss canton of Glarus.

The lake lies at 2,157 m (7,077 ft) on a small plateau near the Gandfurggele, a col between the Garichtisee in the upper Niderental in the west and the Berglialp and the Sernftal in the east. To the north are the two peaks of the Gandstock, to the south the Charenstock. The lake's outflow is a tributary of the Niderenbach, which flows further into the Sernf.

== Access ==
- From the west: Berglimattsee can be reached via a mountain hiking trail from Mettmenalp (mountain station of the cable car Kies-Mettmen) at Garichtisee in about 1.5 hours (550 m altitude difference).
- From the east: the ascent from Engi or Matt in the Sernftal takes about 4 hours (1300 m elevation gain).

== Flora and fauna ==
The lake is rich in small animals (e.g. rotifers) and algae, as well as alpine newts in summer. Fish, on the other hand, do not exist, probably because the lake partially freezes to the bottom in winter.
