= Zaka Valley =

Valley in Slovenia

Coordinates: 46°21′40.74″N 14°4′34.08″E

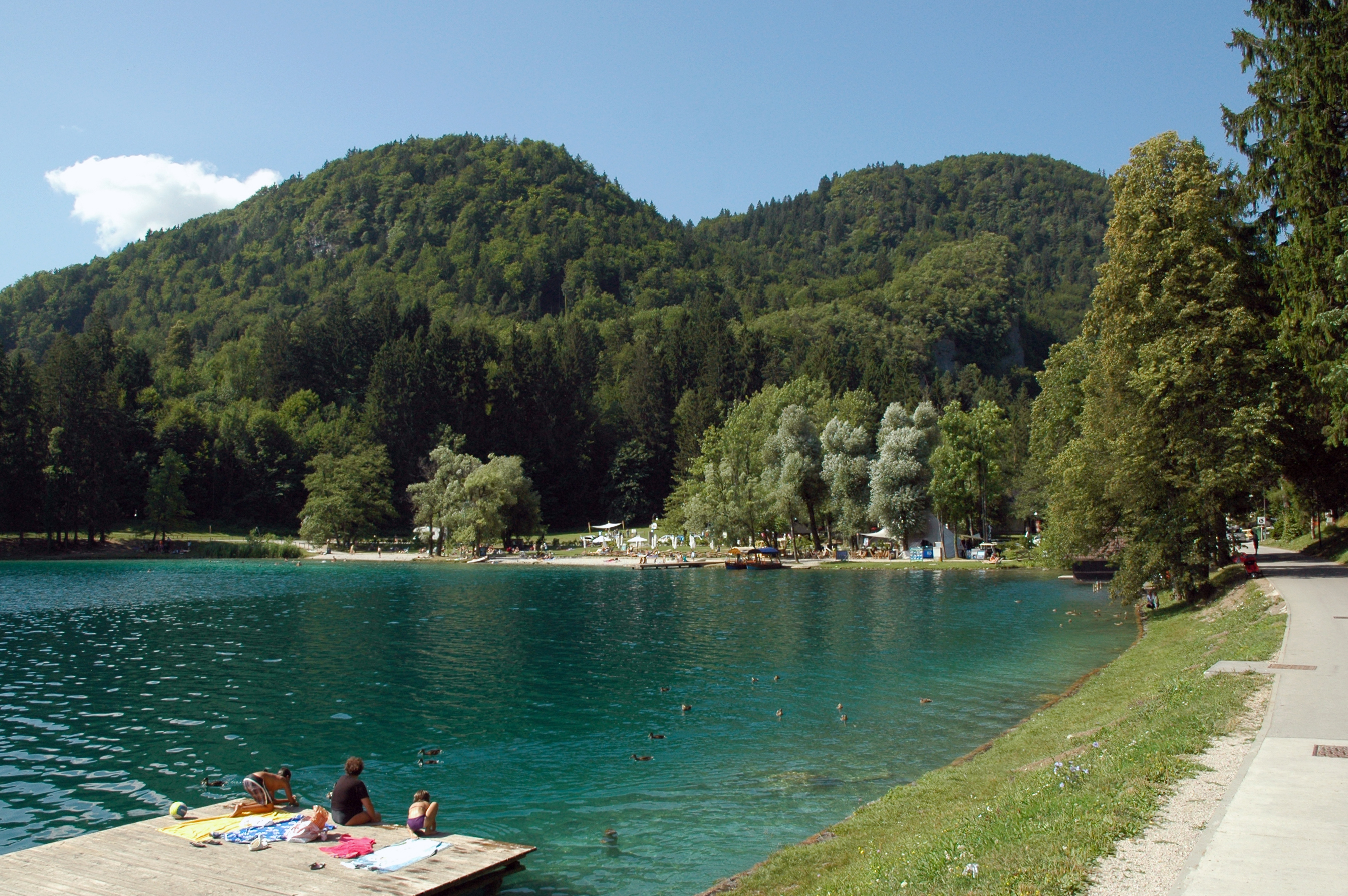
- The Big Zaka Valley (Velika Zaka) in 2013
- Interactive map of Zaka Valley

The Zaka Valley (Slovene: dolina Zaka) is a valley in the Julian Alps in northwestern Slovenia.

== Geography ==
The Zaka Valley lies at the west end of Lake Bled. The railway between Jesenice and Gorizia runs above it. Locally, a distinction is made between the Little Zaka Valley (Mala Zaka), originally at the extreme southeast part of the lake, east of Little Osojnica Hill (Mala Osojnica, 691 meters or 2,267 feet) where Jezernica Creek empties into the lake in the hamlet of Mlino, and the Big Zaka Valley (Velika Zaka), which lies at the westernmost part of the lake between Little Osojnica Hill and Kuhovnica Hill (714 meters or 2,343 feet), through which Zaka Creek flows, emptying into Zaka Bay. The name Mala Zaka is now applied to the area around the rowing club at the extreme northwest part of the lake. Swimming areas are also located in the bays below the Big Zaka Valley and Little Zaka Valley.

== Name ==
The name Zaka was first recorded in 1185 as Zake. France Bezlaj suggested that the name Zaka was a contraction of *zějaka 'opening between hills'. However, Dušan Čop has proposed that the name Zaka is a fused prepositional phrase derived from za Ak- 'behind Ak'. The name Ak refers to two parcels of land, Upper and Lower Ak (Zgornji Ak, Spodnji Ak), and the Ak Mansion (Slovene: Vila Ak, later renamed Partizanka). Popular etymology associated the mansion's name with the initials of its owner, Anton Kokalj (1851–1938). However, the name Ak is believed to be of Celtic origin (although there are also parallels of toponyms with Ak- from German Hacken 'hook').

== History ==
Archaeological finds from the Urnfield culture and Roman coins have been found in the Zaka Valley, and there is a prehistoric Celtic burial site between Upper and Lower Ak. During the Second World War, members of the Carinthian People's League (German: Kärntner Volksbund) renovated two ski jumps in the Zaka Valley.
