= Italian Julian Alps =

Coordinates: 46.349509°N 13.437852°E

The Italian Julian Alps are a mountain range that is part of the Italian Alps that extends from Italy to Slovenia.

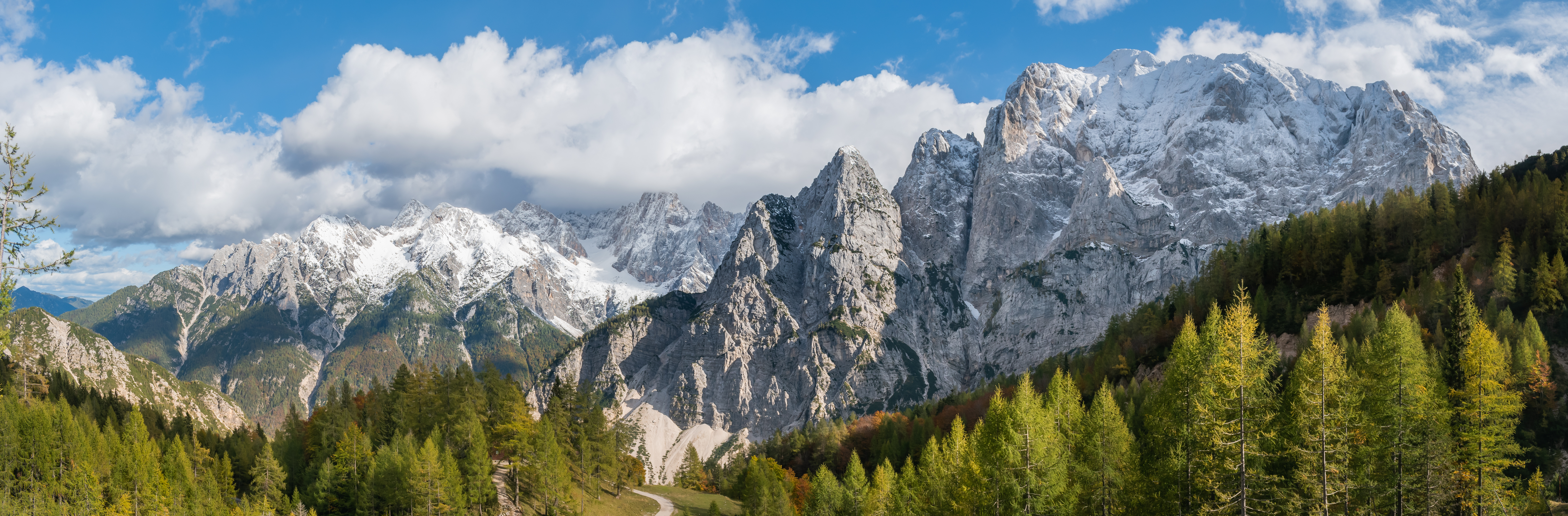
Julian Alps from Vrsic Pass

== Location ==
The Julian Alps begin on the southern side of Sella Carnizza in the Resia Valley and extend to Fella, Dolina and Bohinjka rivers. The Predil Pass divides the east and west sides of the Julians.

== History ==
The Julian Alps contain the current border between Italy and Slovenia. Throughout the history of the region, national borders have changed several times around the Julians.

Prior to World War I the border between Italy and Austria ran from Mount Matajur to Mount Kanin, then along the ridge towards Cima Confine and down east from Sella Nevea past the Rio del Lago valley, then along the main crest of Mount Cregnedùl up to the top of the Montasio, down the Somdogna Saddle to finally reach Pontebba. Between the two World Wars, the Eastern Julian Alps were under the dominion of Italy and so was the most part of the Western ones; the political border ran along the Ponze range from the Ratece Saddle to Mount Jalovec, along Site and Mojstrovske mountains upwards to Mount Prisojnik, to Mounts Kriz and Luknja and finally the Tricorno; the whole valley of the Isonzo river was in the Italian territory.

== Julius Kugy ==
Julius Kugy is a poet and mountaineer who is renowned for opening up routes in the Julian Alps, climbing previously unclimbed peaks as well as his poetry about the region.

== Flora and fauna ==
The fauna of the Julian Alps is very rich as well, a heritage that has to be protected and controlled by the hunting and fishing regulations made by dedicated authorities in the best possible way. More than one thousand species of insects live in the valleys and on the slopes, in the woods you can meet foxes, hares, roe deer, and other minor rodents and mammals, and also species of grouse like hazel grouse and capercaillie. High pastures are the domain of chamois, ibexes, reintoduced from 1970, and ptarmigan. In between the rocks the alpine chough nests, and last but not least the golden eagle, strictly protected. Among the reptiles there are the horned viper (Vipera ammodytes) and Vipera berus, easy to be found over the Montasio plateau, on the southern side of Mount Cimone, towards the Mount Nebria; other reptiles are the alpine salamander and the alpine newt, with its characteristic red stomach.

== Culture ==
The names of places in the Italian Julian Alps have been influenced by people living together for centuries, with words coming from Latin, German and Slavic, mixed up with the local dialects (German from Karinthia, Slav and “Furlàn”). The final influence comes from the Italian dominion, beginning after the Second World War.

== Access ==
There are many different ways of access to the Julians:

- through Canal del Ferro and Tarvisiano, departing from Udine, then north to Resiutta and Tarvisio and east direction Slovenia through Valromana;
- through the Resia Valley, from the small town of Resiutta to the grand Mount Montasio;
- through the Raccolana Valley, from Chiusaforte to Sella Nevea;
- through the Dogna Valley, from the town of Dogna to the Somdogna Saddle, point of connection with the Saisera Valley;
- through the Rio del Lago Valley, from the city of Tarvisio to the miners’ town of Cave del Predil and up to the Predil Pass;
- through the Saisera Valley, in which lays the enchanted little town of Valbruna.

== Short bibliography ==
- V. Dogan and A. Marussi's monography (1932)
- The “Guide of the Julian Alps” by M. Botteri (1956)
- “Italian and Slovenian Julian Alps” by Gino Buscaini (1979)
