= Ichthyosaura randeckensis =

Ichthyosaura randeckensis Temporal range: Miocene

Scientific classification
- Kingdom: Animalia
- Phylum: Chordata
- Class: Amphibia
- Order: Urodela
- Family: Salamandridae
- Genus: Ichthyosaura
- Species: I. randeckensis

Binomial name
- Ichthyosaura randeckensis Schoch & Rasser, 2013

Species of fossil salamander

Ichthyosaura randeckensis is a fossil newt species in the family Salamandridae. It was described in 2013 from a Miocene volcanic lake deposit, the Randeck Maar Formation, in Germany. The fossil specimen is fully articulated and 3–4 centimetres (1.2–1.6 in) long. A phylogenetic analysis found the species to be the sister species of the extant alpine newt (Ichthyosaura alpestris), and the authors therefore placed it in the same genus. Later analysis by other authors did not confirm this, however; they suggested I. randeckensis may not belong to Ichthyosaura. As Ichthyosaura is regarded a junior synnonym of Salamandra and the alpine newt is now placed in the genus Mesotriton, the fossil species should be placed in the latter genus as well.

== See also ==
- List of prehistoric amphibians
