= Savica (waterfall) =

Coordinates: 46.2927785°N 13.7964048°E

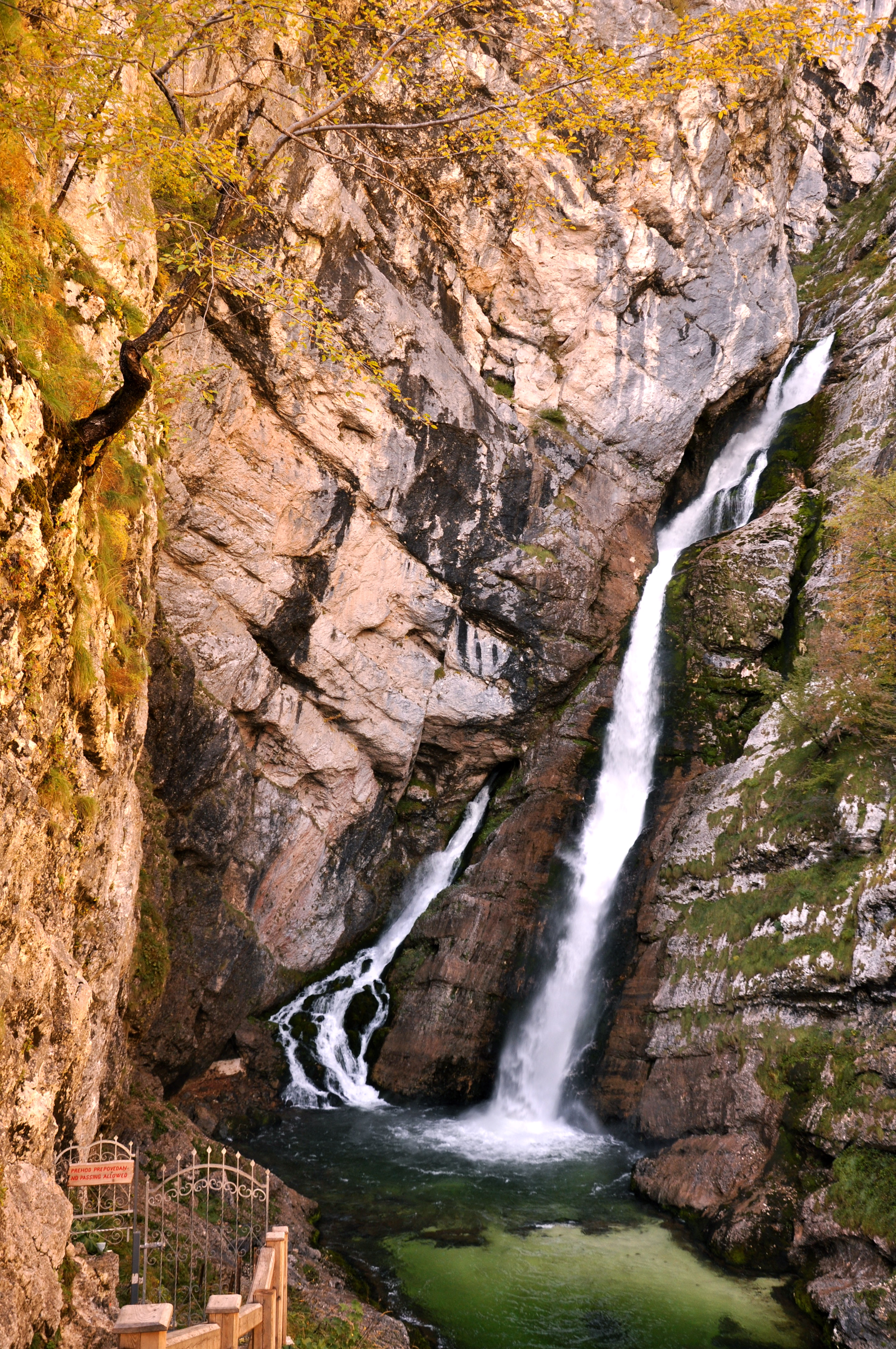
Savica Falls in spring

Savica Falls is a waterfall in northwestern Slovenia. It is 78 meters (256 ft) high and is fed by a karst spring also called Savica just above the waterfall.

A large portion of water is sourced from a karst basin around Black Lake, which lies around 500 meters (1,600 ft) higher above the waterfall, because of which the spring has a relatively steady and strong flow. Water flows to the spring below the ground, where it splits into two parts. After heavy rains, the water supply from the lake and its surroundings may exceed the capacity of tunnels, and a portion of water flows on the surface in cascading waterfalls 600 meters (2,000 ft) high.

The waterfall continues in a stream of the same name, which flows into Lake Bohinj as its main source. Water from Lake Bohinj is further a source of the Sava Bohinjka, which forms the Sava River after joining with the Sava Dolinka.

== Access ==
The waterfall is usually accessed from the Savica lodge, accessible from the western part of Lake Bohinj. The waterfall is about a 15-minute walk from the lodge. Is necessary to pay an entrance fee.

== Gallery ==
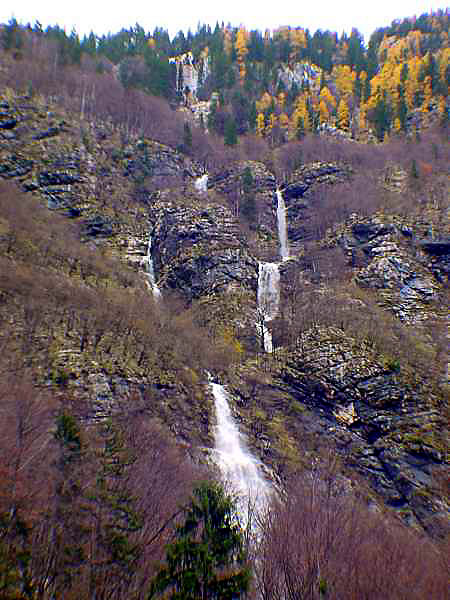
600-meter (2,000 ft) cascade, which appears after heavy rains
