= Jôf Fuart =

Mountain in Italy

- Viš
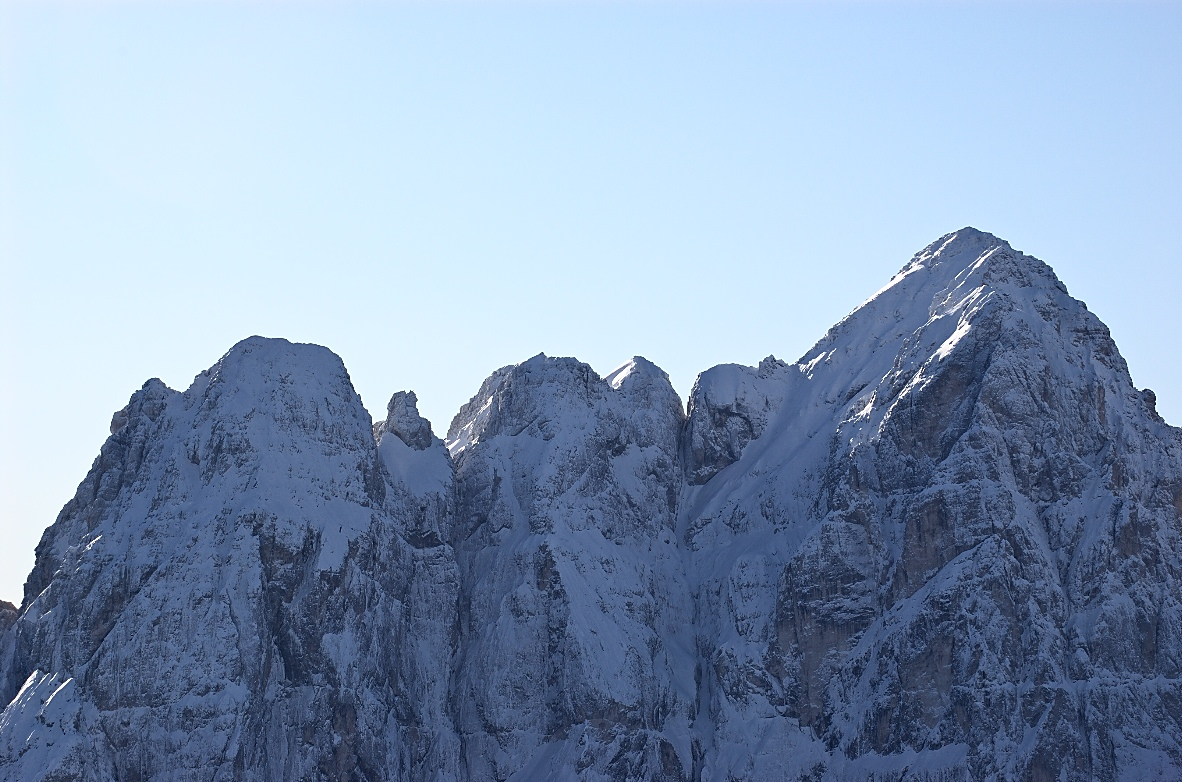
- The summits of Jôf Fuart

Highest point
- Elevation: 2,666 m (8,747 ft)
- Prominence: 528 m (1,732 ft)
- Coordinates: 46°26′26″N 13°27′55″E

Geography
- Location within Alps
- Location: Friuli-Venezia Giulia, Italy
- Parent range: Julian Alps

Jôf Fuart (Slovene: Viš) is a mountain of the Julian Alps in Friuli-Venezia Giulia, Italy.

It lies in the far northeast of Italy, near the border with Slovenia and is the second highest peak in the western Julian Alps after Jôf di Montasio.

The mountain's name is a mistranslation of the original name Viš, (from više, meaning "higher" or višek, "the summit, the peak, the top"), into the friulan "fuart", (like the italian forte, "strong") misinterpreted for the latin word vis ("power").

Because of the steepness of its slopes on all sides, Jôf Fuart is a mountain for experienced climbers. The only marked path to the summit is on its southern side, its northern face is for climbers only. The nearest town is Tarvisio.
