= Chüebodensee =

Lake in Glarus, Switzerland

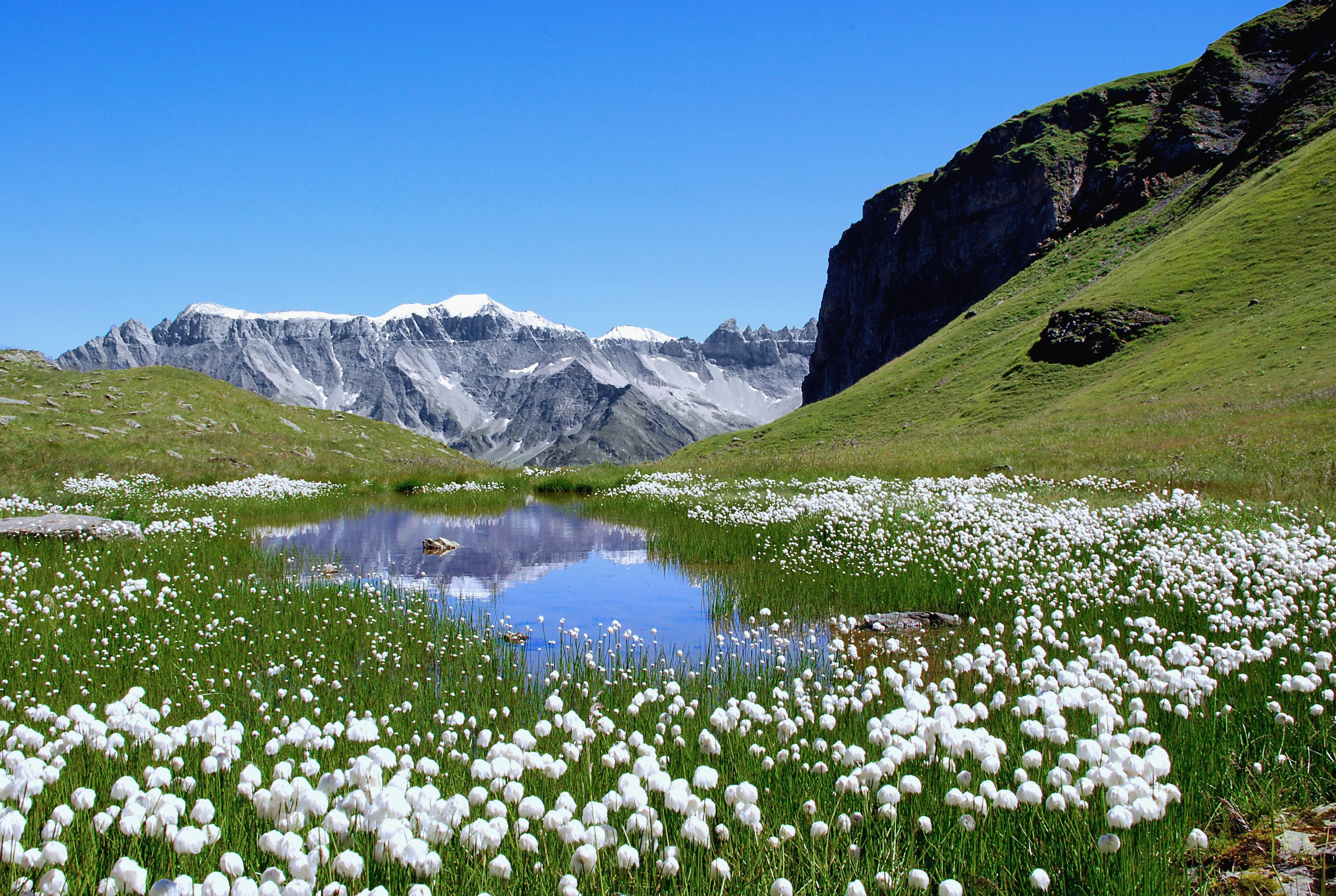

- Location within Canton of Glarus Location within Switzerland Location within Alps
- Interactive map of Chüebodensee
- Location: Elm, Canton of Glarus
- Coordinates: 46°56′11″N 9°8′4″E
- Basin countries: Switzerland
- Surface area: 1.4 ha (3.5 acres)
- Surface elevation: 2,046 m (6,713 ft)

Chüebodensee is a lake above Elm in the Canton of Glarus, Switzerland. Its surface area is 1.4 ha. There are about 8 km of well established trails around the lake. The lake is within the Glarner Freiberg wildlife preserve.

The lake can be reached from Elm by taking the Elm-Ämpächli gondola to Ämpächlialp and hiking over well marked trails. The trip from Ämpächlialp to the lake and back will generally take about 4 hours.
