= Triglav Lakes Valley =

Valley in the Julian Alps, Slovenia

Coordinates: 46°20′N 13°47′E

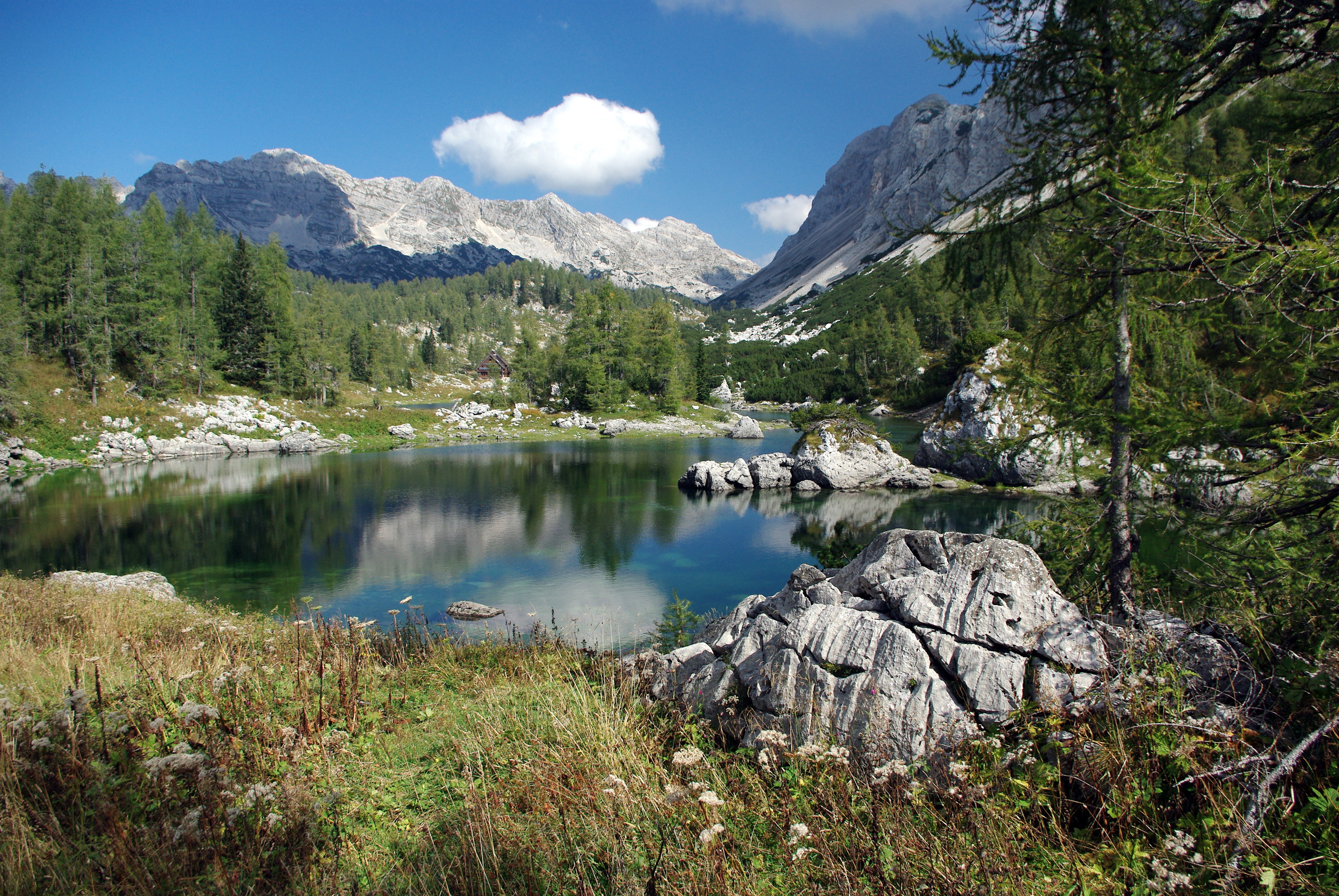
Double Lake (Dvojno jezero) comprises two interconnected lakes.

The Triglav Lakes Valley (Slovene: Dolina Triglavskih jezer) is a rocky hanging valley in the Julian Alps in Slovenia, below the sheer sides of Mount Tičarica and Mount Zelnarica southwest of Triglav. The valley is also called the Seven Lakes Valley (Dolina sedmerih jezer), although there are ten and not seven lakes in the valley. It is above the tree line and is geologically alpine karst; therefore it has also been termed the Sea of Stone Valley (Dolina kamnitega morja).

== Lakes ==
The lowest lake is the Black Lake (Črno jezero) at an elevation of 1,294 metres (4,245 ft) above sea level; it is above the rocky slope of the Komarča Crag. The Alpine newt (Ichthyosaura alpestris), endemic to the Alps, lives in it. Below Mount Tičarica (elevation 1,676 m (5,499 ft)) there are two interconnected lakes known as the Double Lake (Dvojno jezero). At an elevation of 1,838 m (6,030 ft) lies the Big Lake (Veliko jezero) or the Lake Ledvica (literally: Lake Kidney; Jezero v Ledvici). It has the shape of a kidney and is the largest and the deepest of these lakes. The highest is the Podstenje Lake (Jezero v Podstenju), which is located at an elevation of 1,993 m (6,539 ft).

== Mountain huts ==
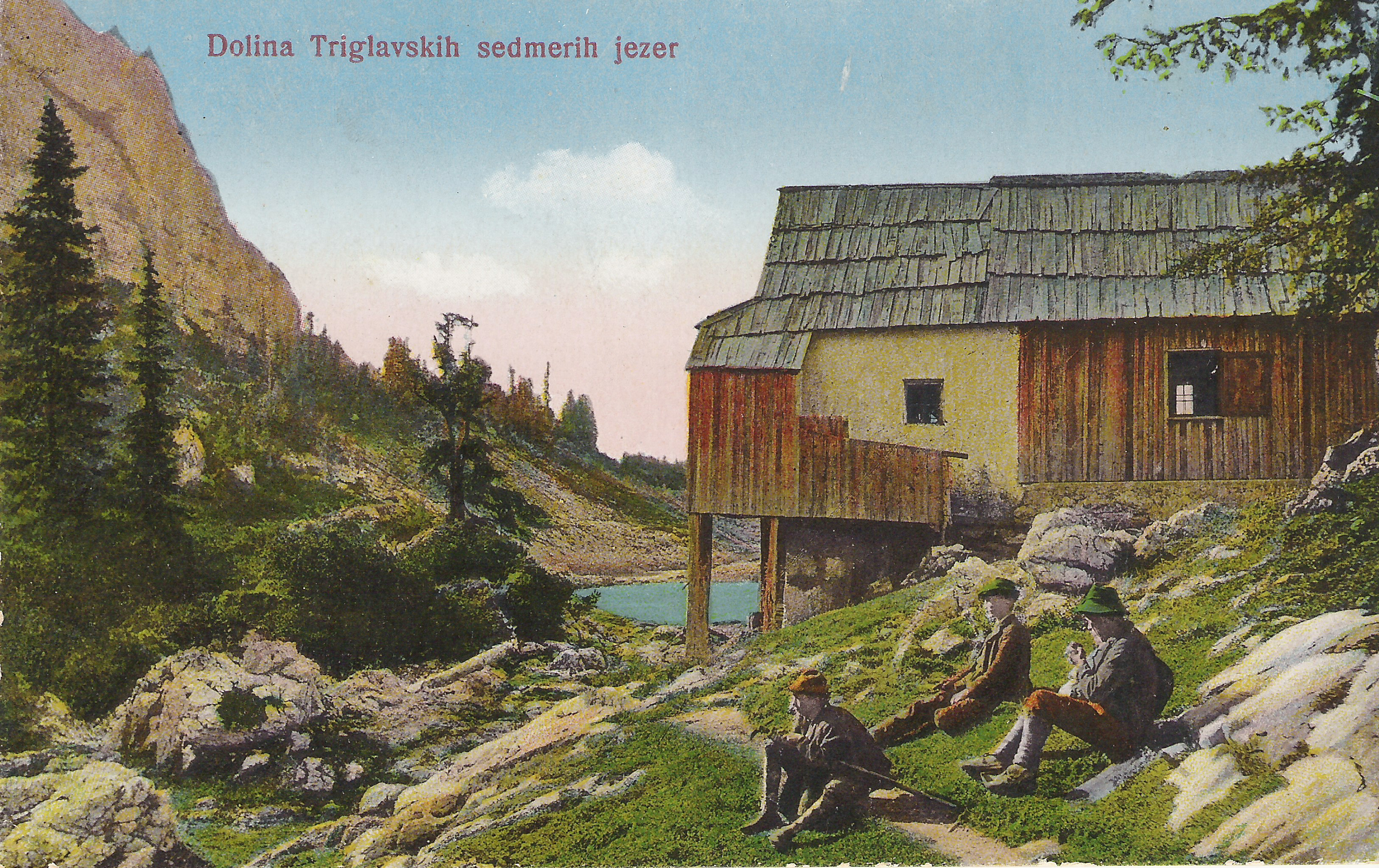
1922 postcard of the Triglav Lakes Valley

There are two mountain lodges in the Triglav Lakes Valley. The Triglav Lakes Lodge (Koča pri Triglavskih jezerih; 1,683 metres or 5,522 feet), owned by the Ljubljana-Matica Hilwalking Club, is located at its southern edge, whereas the Central Sava Lodge at Prehodavci (Zasavska koča na Prehodavcih; 2,071 metres or 6,795 feet), operated by the Radeče Alpine Club, is located at its northern edge. They are two hours apart. They may be accessed from Bohinj over the Komna Plateau (5 hours to the Triglav Lakes Lodge), from Bohinj over the Komarča Crag (3 hours), from the Blato Pasture (3:30 hours), from Trenta (3 hours to the Central Sava Valley Lodge, and over Trebiščina Pasture (3:30 hours to the Central Sava Valley Lodge).

== Cultural significance ==
The designer Marko Pogačnik stylised the Triglav Lakes Valley in the Slovenian coat of arms with two wavy lines under the silhouette of Triglav.
