= Julian Alps =

Mountain range of the Southern Limestone Alps in northeastern Italy and Slovenia

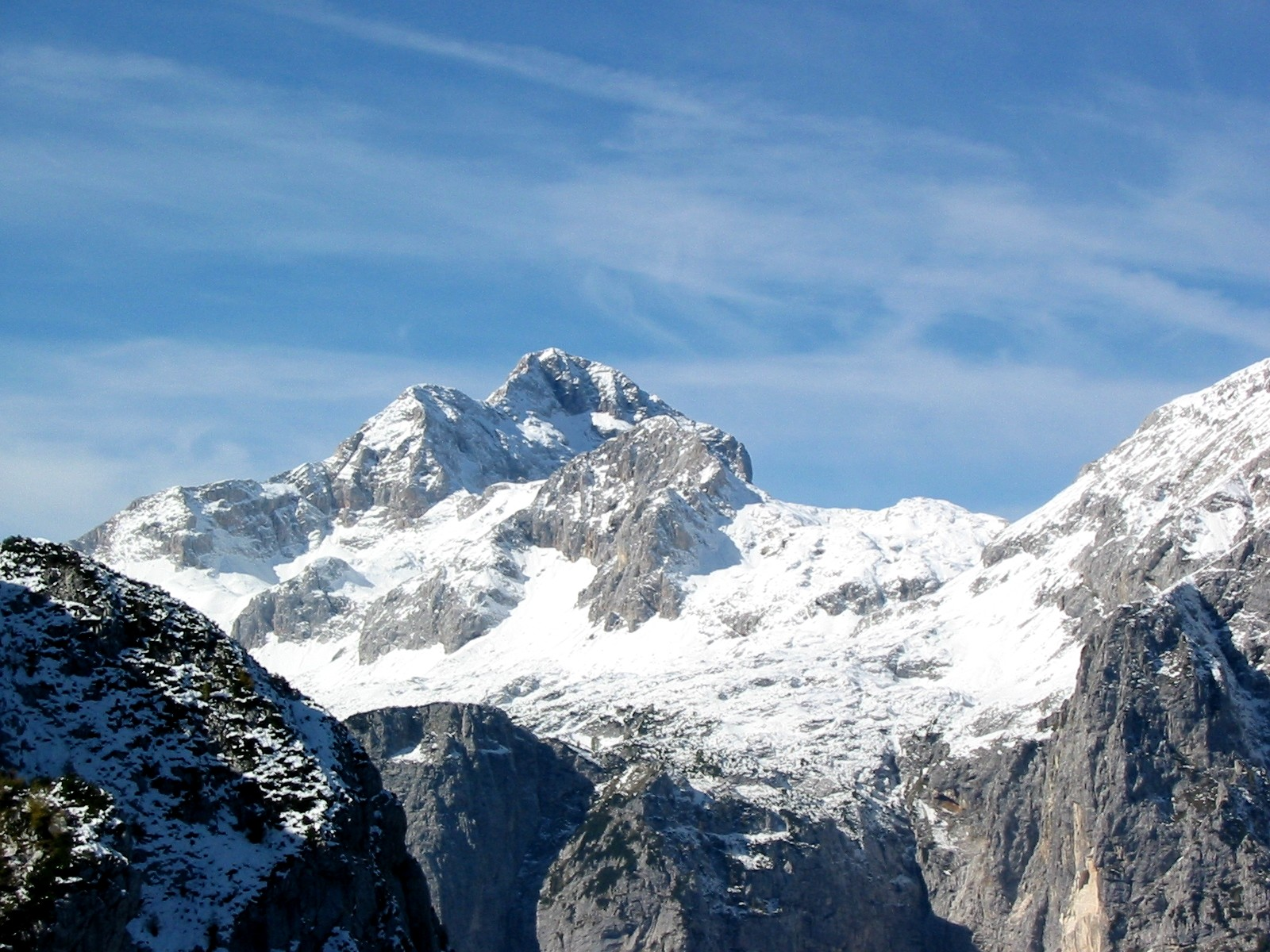
- Triglav (2,864 m or 9,396 ft)

Highest point
- Peak: Triglav
- Elevation: 2,864 m (9,396 ft)
- Coordinates: 46°22′42″N 13°50′12″E

Geography
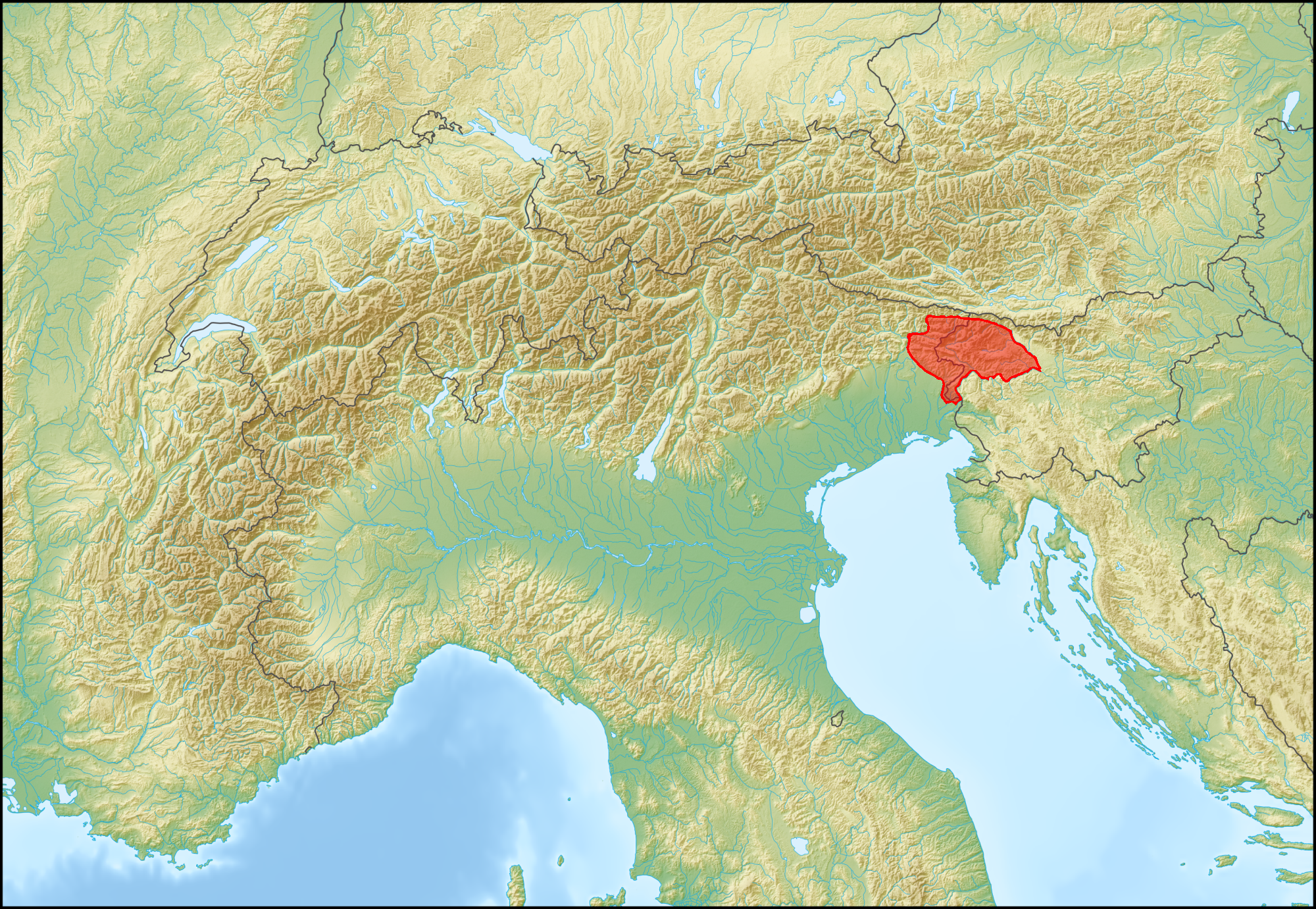
- Julian Alps (in red) within the Alps. The borders of the range according to Alpine Club classification of the Eastern Alps
- Countries: Slovenia; Italy
- Range coordinates: 46°20′N 13°45′E
- Parent range: Southern Limestone Alps

The Julian Alps (Slovene: Julijske Alpe, Italian: Alpi Giulie, Venetian: Alpe Jułie, Friulian: Alps Juliis, German: Julische Alpen) are a mountain range of the Southern Limestone Alps that stretches from northeastern Italy to Slovenia, where they rise to 2,864 m at Mount Triglav, the highest peak in Slovenia. A large part of the Julian Alps is included in Triglav National Park. The second highest peak of the range, the 2,755 m high Jôf di Montasio, lies in Italy.

The Julian Alps cover an estimated 4,400 km^{2} (of which 1,542 km^{2} lies in Italy). They are located between the Sava Valley and Canale Valley. They are divided into the Eastern and Western Julian Alps.

== Name ==
The Julian Alps were known in antiquity as Alpes Iuliae, and also attested as Alpes Julianae c. AD 670, Alpis Julia c. 734, and Alpes Iulias in 1090. Like the municipium of Forum Julii (now Cividale del Friuli) at the foot of the mountains, the range was named after Julius Caesar of the gens Julia, perhaps due to a road built by Julius Caesar and completed by Augustus.

== Eastern Julian Alps ==
There are many peaks in the Eastern Julian Alps over 2,000 m high, and they are mainly parts of ridges. The most prominent peaks are visible by their height and size. There are high plateaus on the eastern border, such as Pokljuka, Mežakla, and Jelovica.

The main peaks by height are the following:

- Triglav 2,864 m (9,396 ft) – the highest mountain and on the coat of arms of Slovenia
- Škrlatica 2,740 m (8,990 ft)
- Mangart 2,679 m (8,789 ft)
- Jalovec 2,645 m (8,678 ft)
- Razor 2,601 m (8,533 ft)
- Kanjavec 2,568 m (8,425 ft)
- Prisojnik 2,546 m (8,353 ft)
- Rjavina 2,532 m (8,307 ft)
- Prestreljenik 2,499 m (8,199 ft)
- Špik 2,472 m (8,110 ft)
- Tosc 2,275 m (7,464 ft)
- Krn 2,244 m (7,362 ft)

== Western Julian Alps ==
The Western Julian Alps cover a much smaller area, and are located mainly in Italy. Only the Kanin group lies in part in Slovenia.

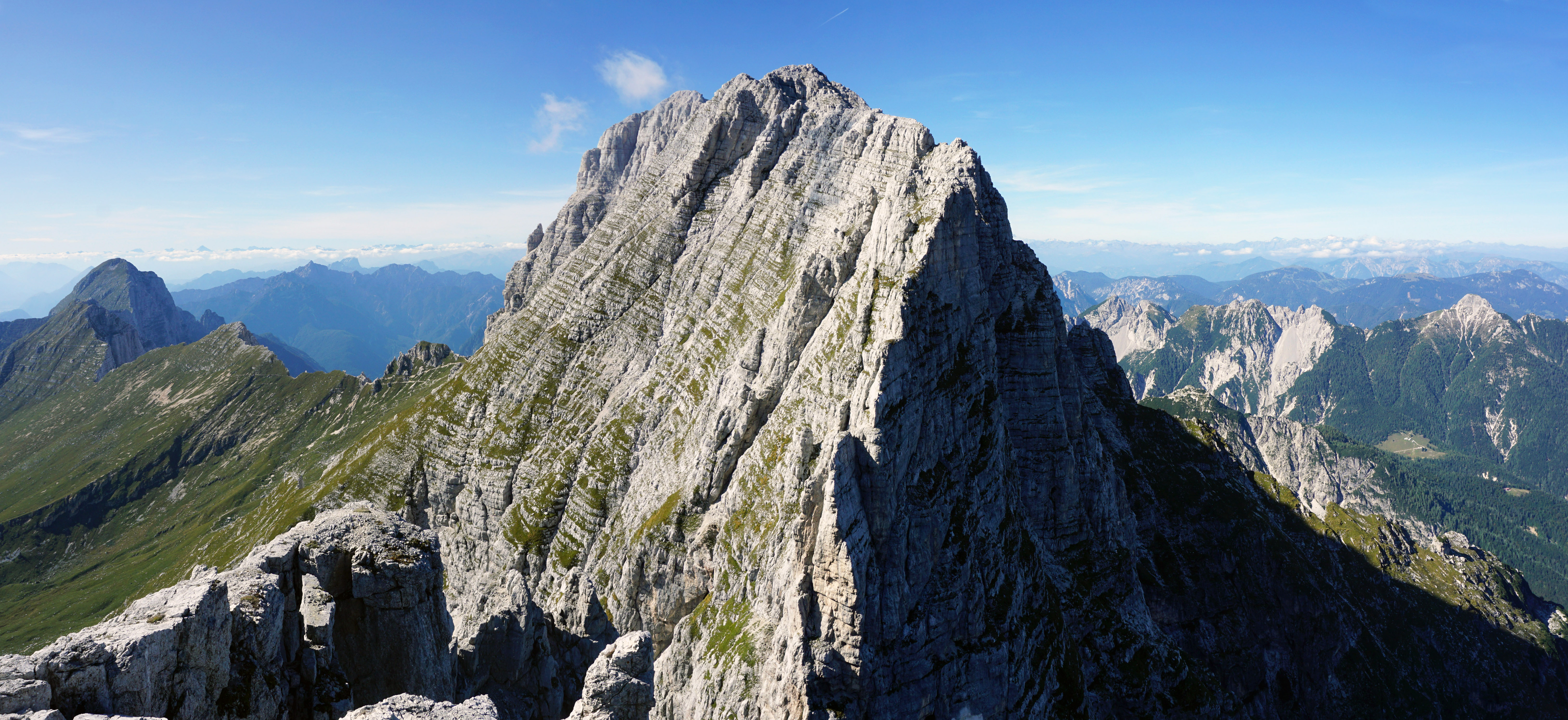
Jôf di Montasio, the second-highest peak in the Julian Alps, located in Italy.

The main peaks by height are:

- Jôf di Montasio (2,755 m or 9,039 ft)
- Jôf Fuart (2,666 m or 8,747 ft)
- High Mount Kanin (2,582 m or 8,471 ft)
- Jôf di Miezegnot (2,087 m or 6,847 ft)

== Passes ==
Important passes of the Julian Alps are:

- The Vršič Pass, 1,611 m (5,826 feet), links the Sava and Soča valleys. It is the highest mountain road pass in Slovenia.
- The Predil Pass (links Villach via Tarvisio and Bovec to Gorizia), paved road 1,156 m (3,792 feet)
- The Pontebba Pass (links Villach via Tarvisio and Pontebba to Udine), railway, paved road, 797 m (2,615 feet)

== See also ==
- Italian Julian Alps
- Triglav Lakes Valley
- List of mountains in Slovenia
- Slovenian Mountain Hiking Trail

== Bibliography ==
- Poljak, Željko (February 1959). "Ostali članci iz Julijskih Alpa". Kazalo za "Hrvatski planinar" i "Naše planine" 1898—1958 (PDF). Naše planine (in Croatian). Vol. XI. pp. 28–29. ISSN 0354-0650.
