= Jôf di Montasio =

Mountain in Italy

- Montasch
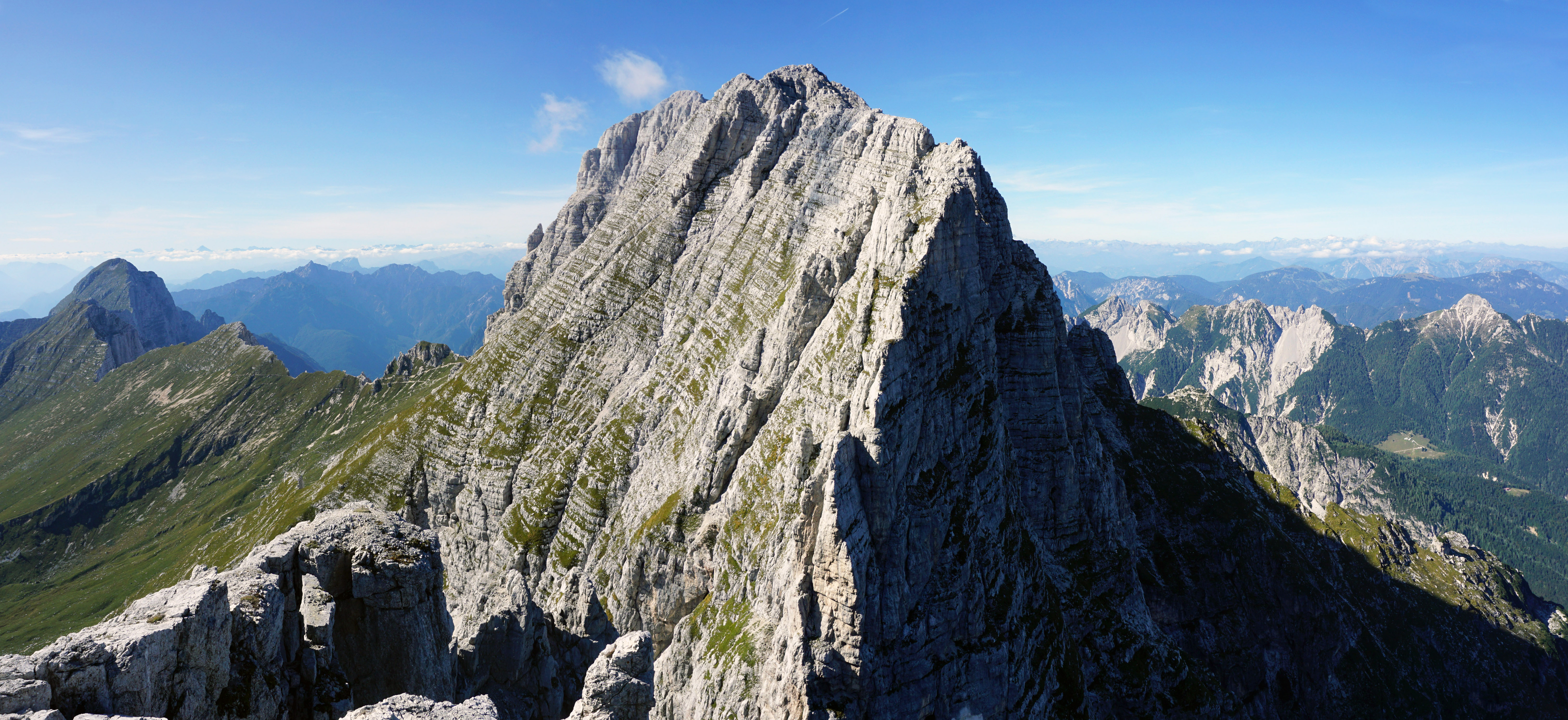
- Montasio mountain group seen from Cima di Terrarossa.

Highest point
- Elevation: 2,752 m (9,029 ft)
- Prominence: 1,596 m (5,236 ft)
- Listing: Ultra
- Coordinates: 46°26′18″N 13°26′02″E

Geography
- Location within Alps
- Location: Friuli-Venezia Giulia, Italy
- Parent range: Julian Alps

Climbing
- First ascent: 18 August 1877 by Hermann Findenegg and Antonio Brussoferro

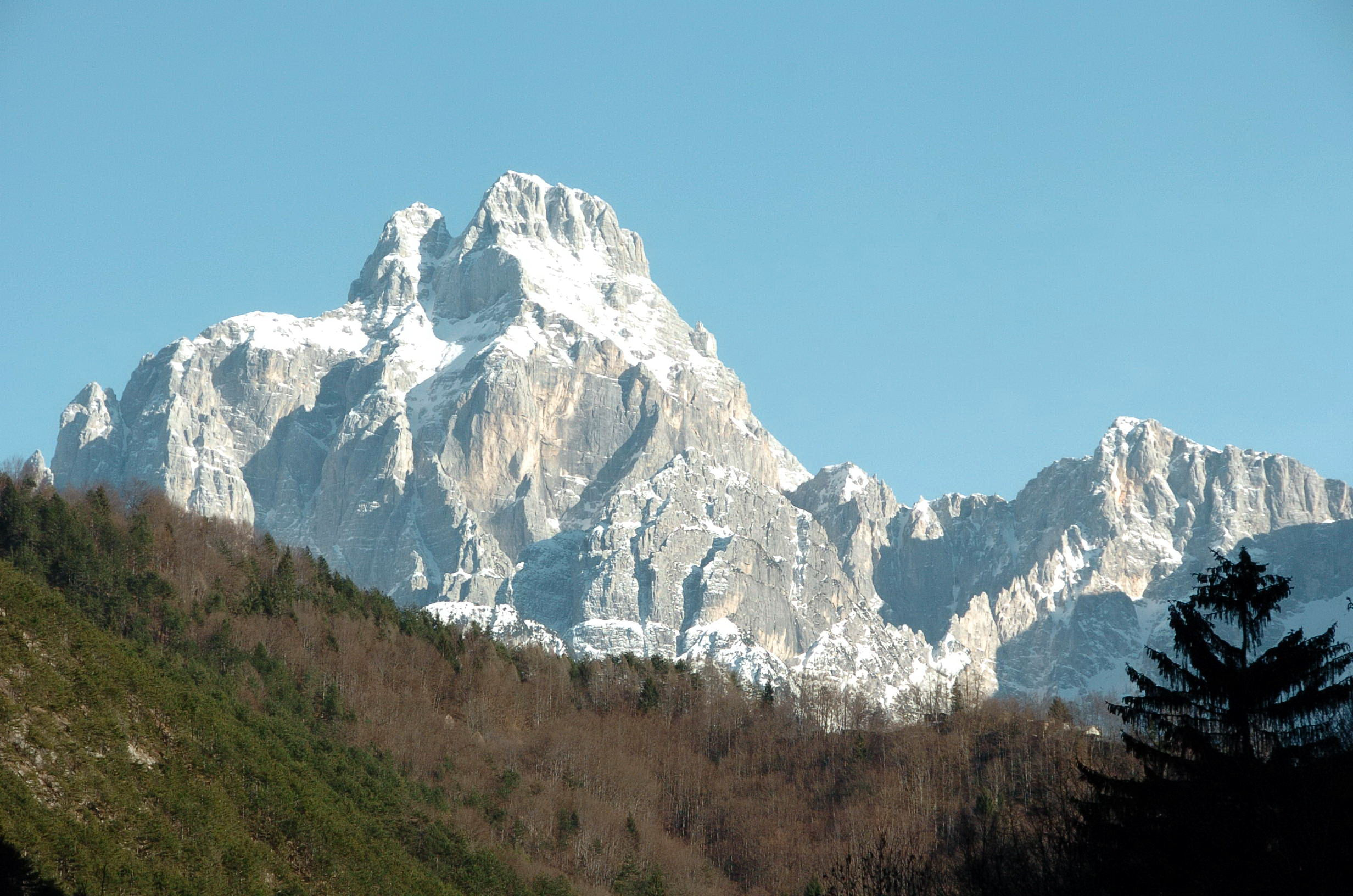
View from Dogna.

The Jôf di Montasio (Italian, Friulian: Jôf dal Montâs, Slovene: Montaž, German: Montasch) is a mountain located in the Province of Udine, in the Friuli-Venezia Giulia region of northeastern Italy.

With its elevation of 2,752 metres (9,029 ft), it is the second highest mountain of the Julian Alps, surpassed only by Triglav. The Julian Alps are part of the Southern Limestone Alps System.

== Etymology ==
Four languages are spoken in the valleys surrounding the mountain - Italian, Friulian, Slovene, and German. The historical German name for the mountain was Bramkofel, while its former Slovene name was Špik nad Policami or Poliški Špik ("Špik above / of the Terraces," the addition serving to distinguish the mountain from a different Špik 30 km to the east.) In modern usage, German and Slovene speakers use Montasch and Montaž, both borrowings from the Friulian Montâs.

== History ==
The steep Montasio massif, extending about 20 kilometres (12 mi) in an east–west direction, has since medieval times formed a natural border between the Imperial Duchy of Carinthia in the north and the Venetian Domini di Terraferma in the south. During World War I, the area from the mountains to the Sella Nevea pass was permanently manned by the Alpini as part of the Italian Front. However, no hostility actions occurred, as the northern face of the mountain was too steep for the Austro-Hungarian Army.

The top of the mountain is marked by a cross and bell in memory of Riccardo Deffar.

== Climbing routes ==
There are many climbing routes from all sides. Many of them are hard rock climbing routes and ferratas, in particular from the north-east side. The normal mountaineering route is from the south side. It passes the Rifugio Brazza, at round 1650 m above the sea level. Afterward, climbers can choose from two directions: towards the Pipan Ladder, or towards Findenegg Couloir and the Suringar bivouac at 2400 m above the sea level.

The Pipan Ladder is a 60 m steel structure which requires ferrata equipment. Some sections in the Findenegg Couloir route are a bit exposed, and there are some simple scrambles at several places above the Suringar bivouac.

== See also ==
- List of Alpine peaks by prominence
- Mountains of the Alps
