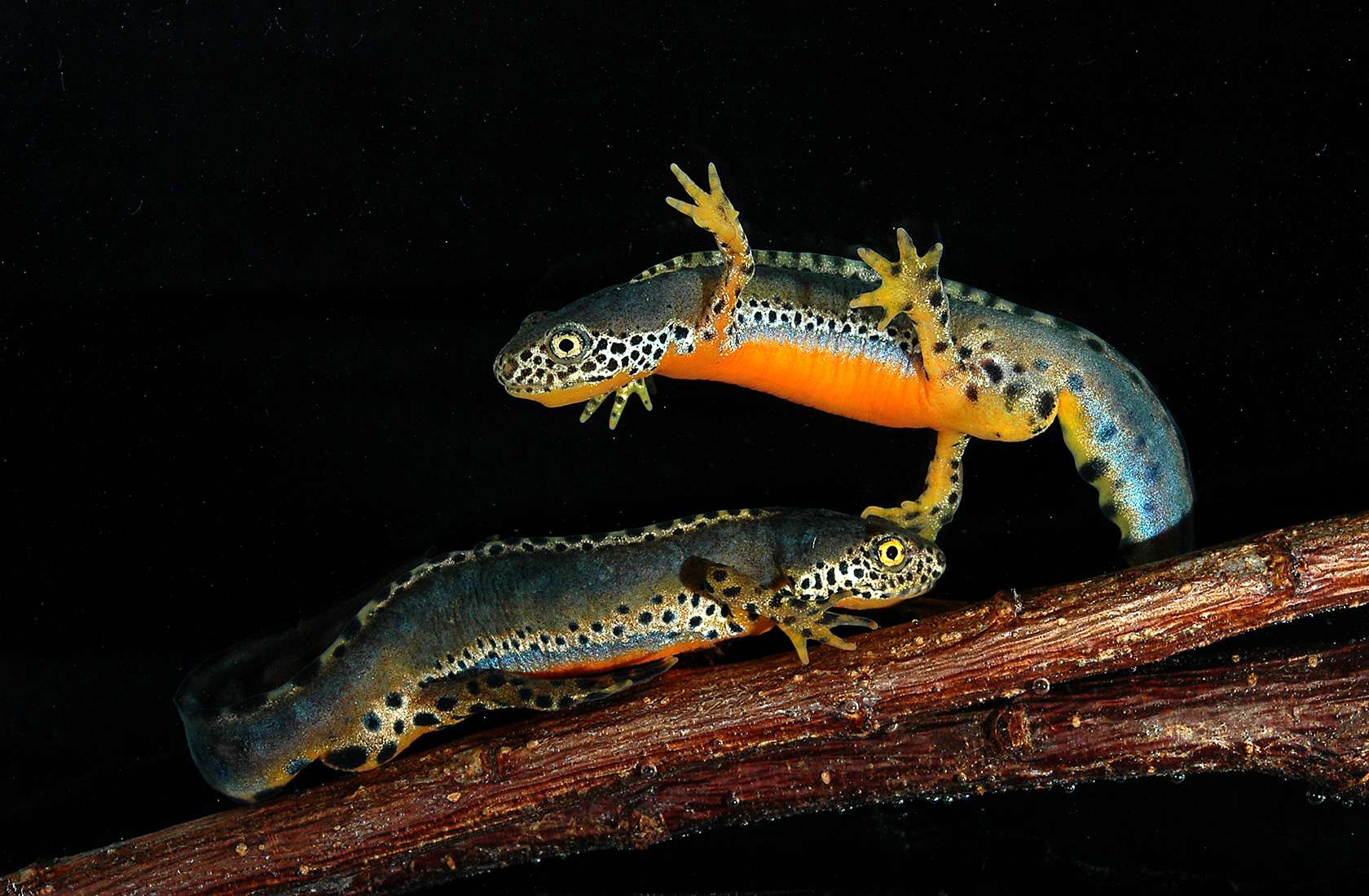
- Two males during breeding season

Conservation status
- Least Concern (IUCN 3.1)

Scientific classification
- Kingdom: Animalia
- Phylum: Chordata
- Class: Amphibia
- Order: Urodela
- Family: Salamandridae
- Genus: Mesotriton; Bolkay, 1927
- Species: M. alpestris

Binomial name
- Mesotriton alpestris (Laurenti, 1768)

Subspecies
- M. a. alpestris; M. a. apuana; M. a. cyreni; M. a. veluchiensis; (debated, see text)
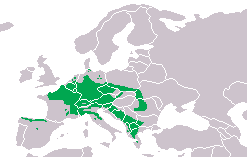

Synonyms
- Around 80, including: Triton alpestris (Laurenti, 1768); Triturus alpestris (Dunn, 1918); Ichthyosaura alpestris

= Alpine newt =

Alpine newt Temporal range: Miocene–present

Species of amphibian

The alpine newt (Mesotriton alpestris) is a species of newt native to continental Europe and introduced to Great Britain and New Zealand. Adults measure 7–12 cm (2.8–4.7 in) and are usually dark grey to blue on the back and sides, with an orange belly and throat. Males are more conspicuously coloured than the drab females, especially during breeding season.

The alpine newt occurs at high altitude as well as in the lowlands. Living mainly in forested land habitats for most of the year, the adults migrate to puddles, ponds, lakes or similar water bodies for breeding. Males court females with a ritualised display and deposit a spermatophore. After fertilisation, females usually fold their eggs into leaves of water plants. The aquatic larvae grow up to 5 cm (2.0 in) in around three months before metamorphosing into terrestrial juvenile efts, which mature into adults at around three years. In the southern range, the newts sometimes do not metamorphose but keep their gills and stay aquatic as paedomorphic adults. Larvae and adults feed mainly on diverse invertebrates and themselves fall prey to dragonfly larvae, large beetles, fish, snakes, birds or mammals.

Populations of the alpine newt started to diverge around 20 million years ago. At least four subspecies are distinguished, and some argue there are several distinct, cryptic species. Although still relatively common and classified as Least Concern on the IUCN Red List, alpine newt populations are decreasing and have locally gone extinct. The main threats are habitat destruction, pollution and the introduction of fish such as trout into breeding sites. Where it has been introduced, the alpine newt can potentially transmit diseases to native amphibians, and it is being eradicated in New Zealand.

== Taxonomy ==
=== Nomenclature ===
The alpine newt was first described in 1768 by Austrian zoologist Laurenti, as Triton alpestris, from the Ötscher mountain in the Austrian Alps (alpestris meaning "alpine" in Latin). He used that name for a female and described the male (Triton salamandroides) and the larva (Proteus tritonius) as different species. Later, the alpine newt was placed in the genus Triturus along with most other European newts. When genetic evidence showed that Triturus as then defined contained several unrelated lineages, García-París and colleagues in 2004 split off the alpine newt as the monotypic genus Mesotriton, which had been erected as a subgenus by Bolkay in 1928.

However, the name Ichthyosaura had been introduced in 1801 by Sonnini de Manoncourt and Latreille for "Proteus tritonius", the larva of the alpine newt. It would therefore have priority over Mesotriton. "Ichthyosaura", Greek for "fish lizard", refers to a nymph-like creature in classical mythology. The name Mesotriton alpestris, which was revalidated in 2004 and has since been increasingly used, would therefore no longer be valid, as it had only been coined in 1928. However, the validity of the name Ichthyosaura alpestris was not recognized by all authors, and Mesotriton alpestris continued to be used. The taxonomic issue was finally clarified by designation of a larva of the fire salamander (Salamandra salamandra) collected at the type locality of Proteus tritonius, the type species of Ichthyosaura, as the neotype of Proteus tritonius, rendering Ichthyosaura a synonym of Salamandra and thus Mesotriton the oldest available genus name for the alpine newt.

=== Subspecies ===
Four subspecies (see table below) were recognised for the alpine newt by Roček and colleagues (2003), followed by later authors, while some previously described subspecies were not retained. The four subspecies correspond only in part to the five major lineages identified within the species (see section Evolution below): The western populations of the nominate subspecies I. a. alpestris, together with the Cantabrian I. a. cyreni and the Apennine I. a. apuana form one group, while the eastern populations of I. a. alpestris are genetically closer to the Greek I. a. veluchiensis. Differences in body shape and colour between the subspecies are not consistent.

Several authors argued that the ancient lineages of the alpine newt might represent cryptic species. Four species were therefore distinguished by Raffaëlli in 2018, but Frost considers this premature. In 2026, the populations of the Vlasina Plateau and surroundings in south-eastern Serbia and adjacent western Bulgaria were described as a separate species, Mesotriton similis.

Subspecies		Raffaëlli (2018) classification	Distribution
I. a. alpestris (Laurenti, 1768) – Alpine newt	western populations	retained as I. alpestris alpestris	Northwestern France to northern Carpathians in Romania, southern Denmark in to Alps and France just north of the Mediterranean
I. a. alpestris (Laurenti, 1768) – Alpine newt	eastern populations	I. reiseri (species), with subspecies reiseri, carpathica and montenegrina	Balkan Peninsula north of Greece to Bulgaria and southern Carpathians in Romania
I. a. apuana (Bonaparte, 1839) – Apennine alpine newt		I. apuana (species), with subspecies apuana and inexpectata (Calabria)	Extreme southeastern France, Apennines to Lazio in central Italy, isolated populations in Calabria
I. a. cyreni (Mertens & Muller, 1940) – Cantabrian alpine newt		retained	Spain: Cantabrian mountains and Sierra de Guadarrama (introduced)
I. a. veluchiensis (Wolterstorff, 1935) – Greek alpine newt		I. veluchiensis (species)	Greece: mainland and northern Peloponnese

== Evolution ==
Alpine newt populations have separated since the Early Miocene, around 20 million years ago, according to a molecular clock estimate by Recuero and colleagues. Known fossil remains are much more recent: they were found in the Pliocene of Slovakia and the Pleistocene of Northern Italy. An older, Miocene fossil from Germany, Ichthyosaura randeckensis, may be the sister species of the alpine newt.

Molecular phylogenetic analyses showed that alpine newts split into a western and an eastern group. Each of these again contains two major lineages, which in part correspond to described subspecies (see section Distribution and subspecies above). These ancient genetic differences suggest that the alpine newt may be a complex of several distinct species. Higher temperatures during the Miocene or sea level oscillations may have separated early populations, leading to allopatric speciation, although admixture and introgression between lineages probably took place. Populations from Vlasina Lake in Serbia have mitochondrial DNA that is distinct from and more ancient than that of all other populations; it may have been inherited from a now extinct "ghost" population. The Quaternary glaciation probably led to cycles of retreat into refugia, expansion and range shifts.

== Description ==
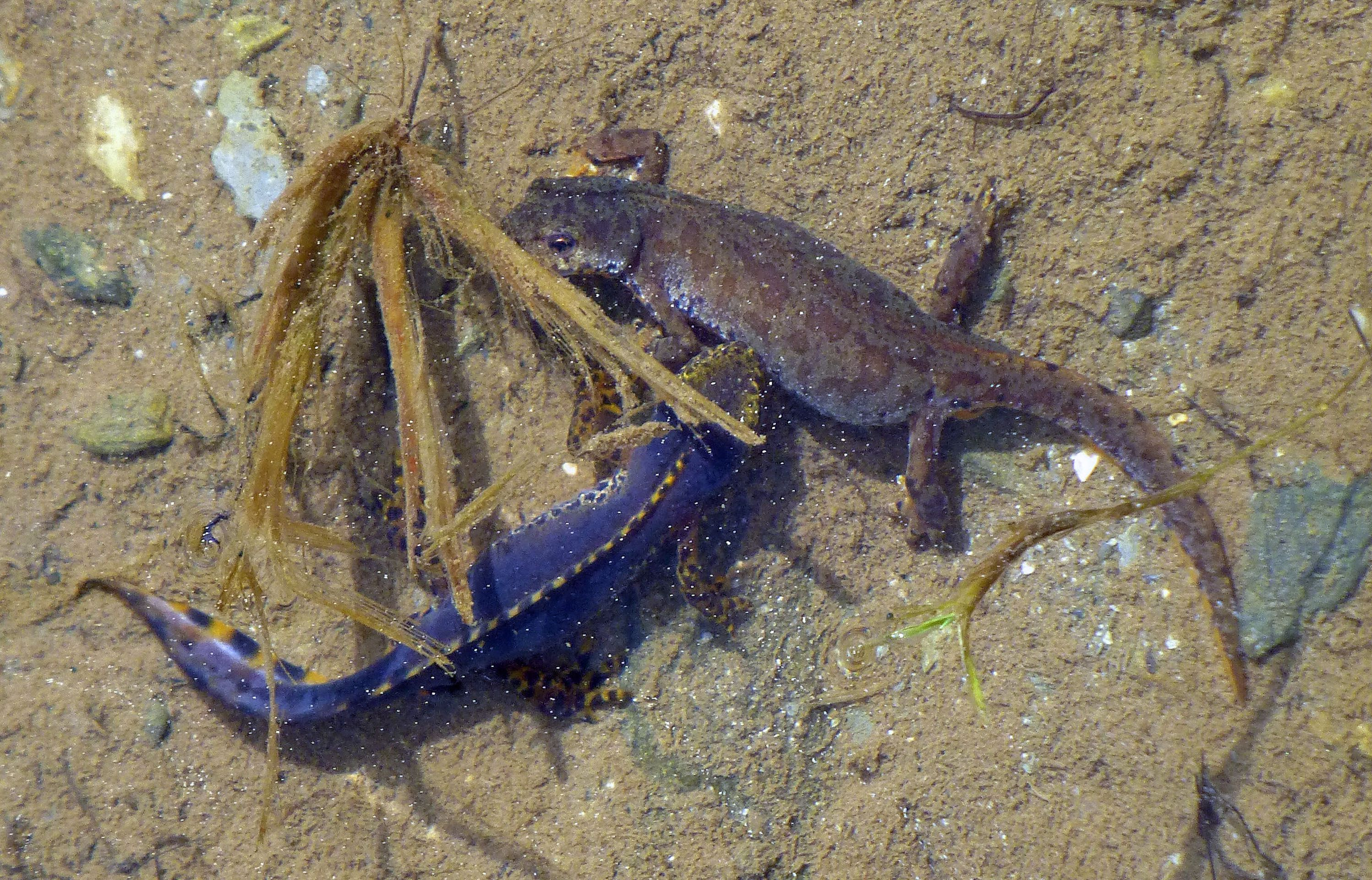
Dorsal view of a male (bright blue, left) courting a female (mottled grey, right) in a shallow pond

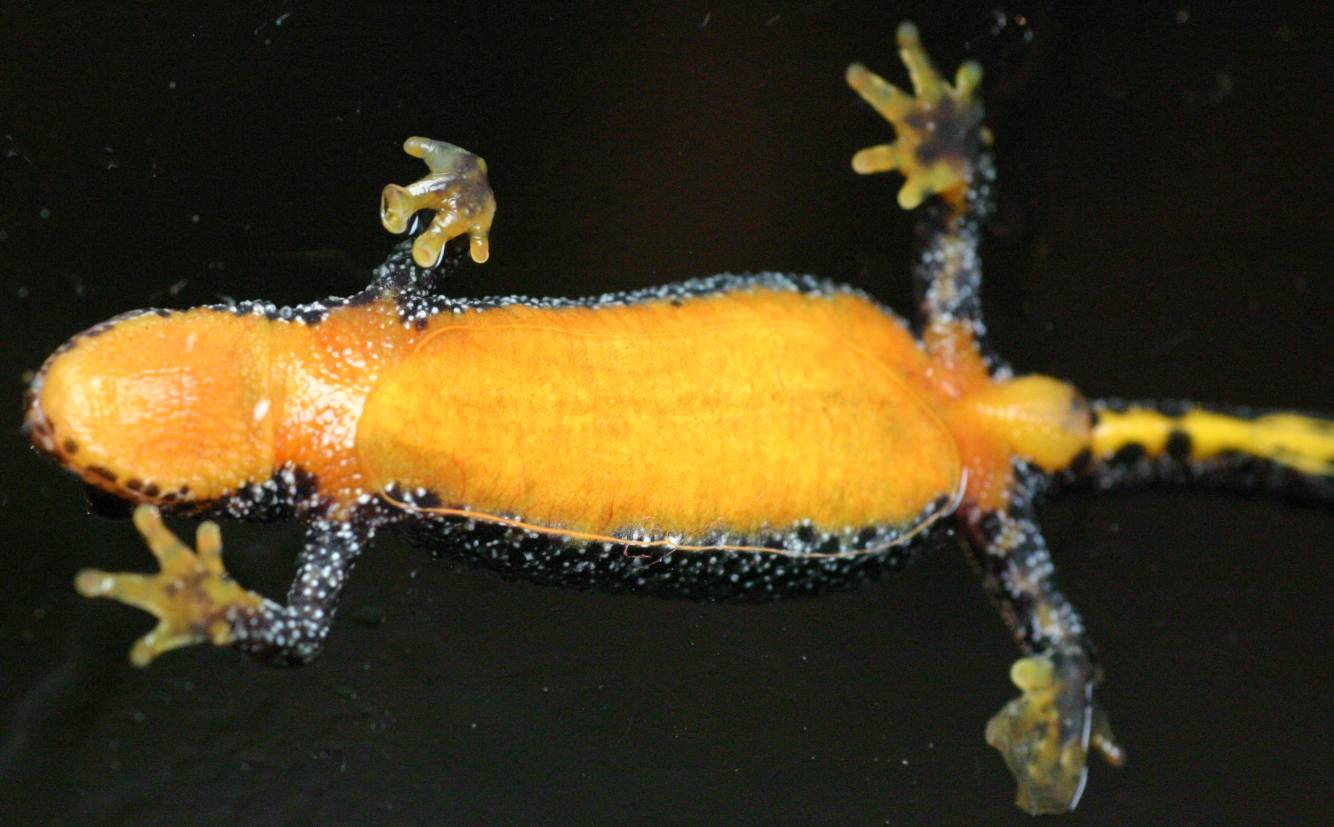
Throat and belly are orange and usually unspotted.

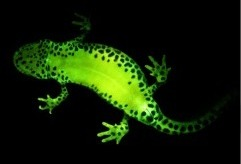
Biofluorescence in an alpine newt

The alpine newt is medium-sized and stocky. It reaches 7–12 cm (2.8–4.7 in) length in total, females measuring roughly 1–2 cm (0.39–0.79 in) longer than males, and a body weight of 1.4–6.4 g. The tail is compressed sideways and is half as long or slightly shorter than the rest of the body. During their life in water, both sexes develop a tail fin, and males a low (up to 2.5 mm), smooth-edged crest on their back. The cloaca of males swells during breeding season. The skin is smooth during the breeding season and granular outside it, and is velvety during the animal's land phase.

The characteristic dark grey to bright blue of the back and sides is strongest during breeding season. This base colour may vary to greenish and is more drab and mottled in females. The belly and throat are orange and only occasionally have dark spots. Males have a white band with black spots and a light blue flash running along the flanks from the cheeks to the tail. During breeding season, their crest is white with regular dark spots. Juvenile efts, just after metamorphosis, resemble adult terrestrial females, but sometimes have a red or yellow line on the back. Very rarely, leucistic individuals have been observed.

While these traits apply to the widespread nominate subspecies, I. a. alpestris, the other subspecies differ slightly. I. a. apuana often has dark spots on the throat and sometimes on the belly. I. a. cyreni has a slightly rounder and larger skull than the nominate subspecies but is otherwise very similar. In I. a. veluchiensis, females have a more greenish colour, spots on the belly, sparse dark spots on the lower tail edge, and a narrower snout, but these differences between subspecies are not consistent.

Larvae are 7–11 mm long after hatching and grow to 3–5 cm (1.2–2.0 in) just before metamorphosis. They initially have only two small filaments (balancers), between the eyes and gills on each side of the head, which later disappear as the forelegs and then the hindlegs develop. The larvae are light brown to yellow and initially have dark longitudinal stripes, which later dissolve into a dark pigmentation that is stronger towards the tail. The tail is pointed and sometimes ends in a short filament. Alpine newt larvae are more robust and have wider heads than those of the smooth newt and palmate newt.

== Distribution ==
The alpine newt is native to continental Europe. It is relatively common over a large, more or less continuous range from northwestern France to the Carpathians in Romania, and from southern Denmark in the north to the Alps and France just north of the Mediterranean in the south, but absent from the Pannonian Basin. Isolated areas of distribution in Spain, Italy and Greece correspond to distinct subspecies (see section Taxonomy: Subspecies above). Alpine newts have been deliberately introduced to parts of continental Europe, including within the boundaries of cities such as Bremen and Berlin. Other introductions have occurred to Great Britain, mainly England but also Scotland, , Ireland, Denman Island (British Columbia, Canada), and Coromandel Peninsula in New Zealand. A thriving introduced population was discovered in 2014 in the Catalonian Pre-Pyrenees (Santa Maria de Besora, Barcelona), likely established from released captive individuals; this population was found to be a carrier of ranavirus.

The alpine newt can occur at high elevation and has been found up to 2,370 m (7,780 ft) above sea level in the Alps. It also occurs in the lowlands down to sea level. Towards the south of its range, most populations are found above 1,000 m (3,300 ft).

== Habitats ==
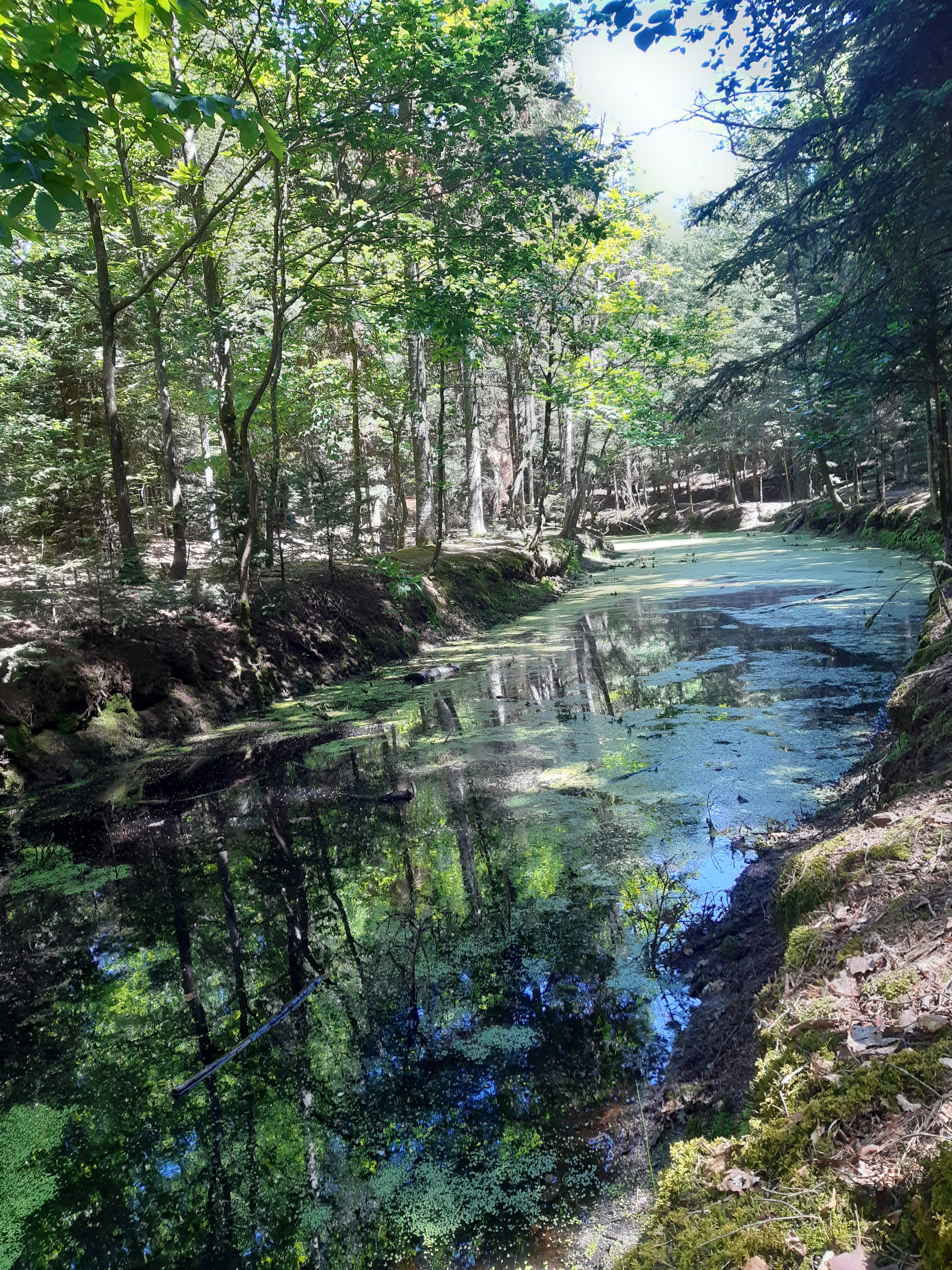
Shady ponds surrounded by forest (here in the Vosges, France) are typical breeding sites for alpine newts.

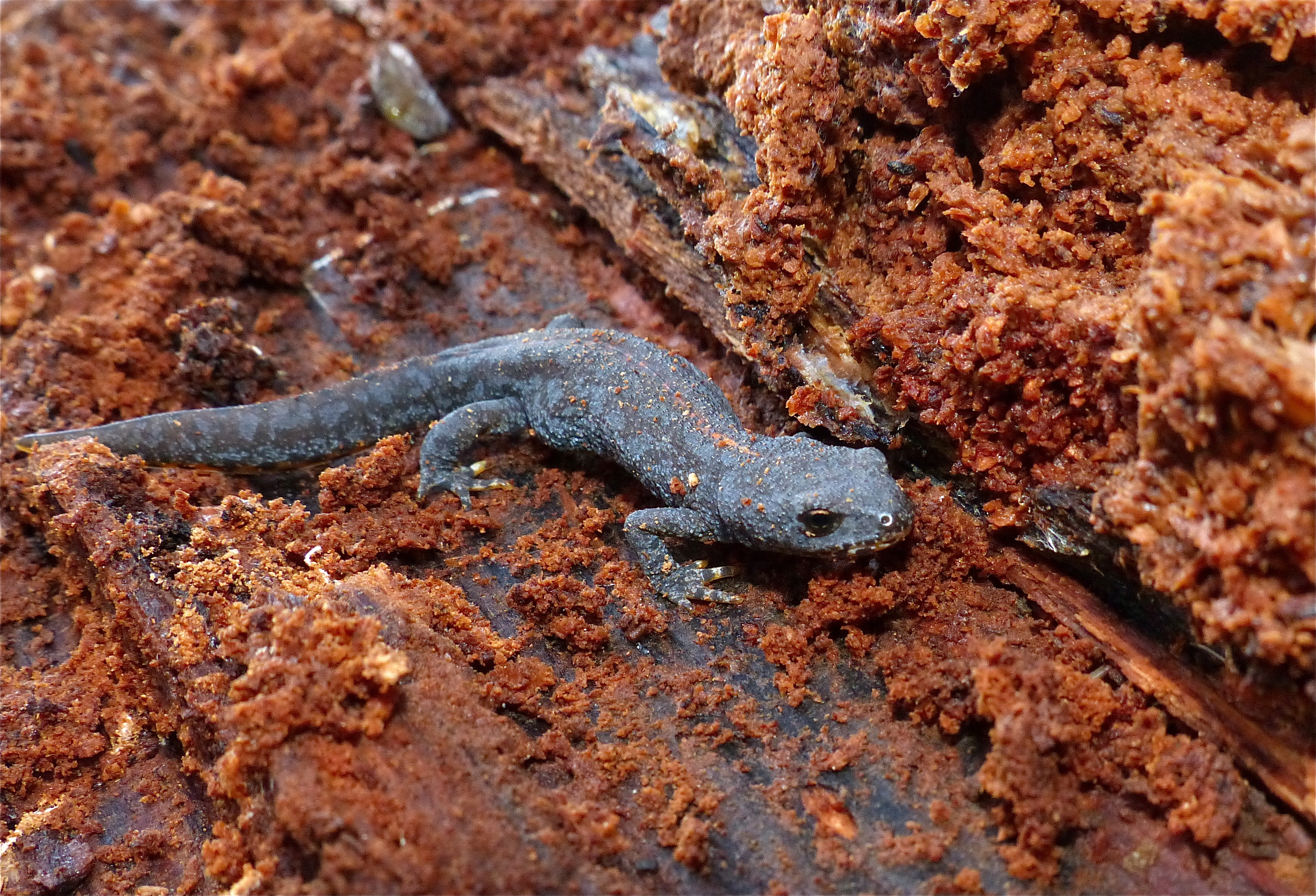
Juvenile eft hibernating in dead wood

Forests, including both deciduous and coniferous forests (pure spruce plantations are avoided), are the main land habitat. Less common are forest edges, brownfield land, or gardens. Populations can be found above tree line in the high mountains, where they prefer south-exposed slopes. The newts use logs, stones, leaf litter, burrows, construction waste or similar structures as hiding places.

Aquatic breeding sites close to adequate land habitat are critical. While small, cool water bodies in forested areas are preferred, alpine newts tolerate a wide range of permanent or non-permanent, natural or human-made water bodies. These can range from shallow puddles over small ponds to larger, fish-free lakes or reservoirs and quiet parts of streams. Damming by beavers creates suitable breeding sites. Overall, the alpine newt is tolerant regarding chemical parameters such as pH, water hardness and eutrophication. Other European newts such as the crested, smooth, palmate or Carpathian newt often use the same breeding sites, but are less common at higher elevation.

== Lifecycle and behaviour ==
Alpine newts are usually semiaquatic, spending most of the year (9–10 months) on land and only returning to the water for breeding. The efts are probably terrestrial until they reach sexual maturity. At lower altitudes this occurs in males after around three years, and in females after four to five years. Lowland alpine newts can reach the age of ten. At higher altitudes, maturity is reached only after 9–11 years, and the newts can live for up to 30 years.

=== Terrestrial phase ===
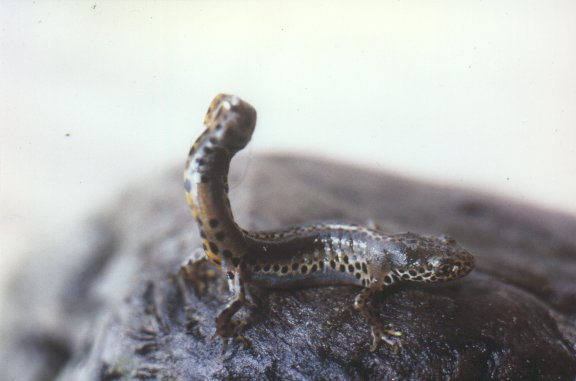
Defensive position, with tail curled up

On land, alpine newts are mainly nocturnal, hiding for most of the day and moving and feeding during the night or in the twilight. Hibernation also usually takes place in terrestrial hiding places. They have been observed to climb up to 2 metres (6.6 ft) on vertical walls of basement ducts, where they hibernated, on wet nights. Migration to breeding sites occurs on sufficiently warm (above 5 °C) and humid nights and may be delayed or interrupted for several weeks in unfavourable conditions. The newts can also leave the water in case of a sudden cold snap.

Alpine newts tend to stay close to their breeding sites and only a small proportion, mainly juvenile efts, disperse to new habitats. A dispersal distance of 4 km (2.5 mi) has been observed, but such large distances are uncommon. Over short distances, the newts use mainly their sense of smell for navigation, while over long distances, orientation by the night sky, and potentially through magnetoreception are more important.

=== Aquatic phase and breeding ===
The aquatic phase starts at snowmelt, from February in the lowlands to June at higher altitudes, while egg laying follows a few months later and can continue until August. Some southern populations in Greece and Italy appear to stay aquatic most of the year and hibernate underwater. In the Apennine subspecies, I. a. apuana, two rounds of breeding and egg-laying in autumn and spring have been observed .

Stages of courtship display, filmed in captivity

Breeding behaviour occurs mainly in the morning and at dawn. Males perform a courtship display. The male first places himself in front of the female remains static for a while, then fans his tail to stimulate the female and wave pheromones towards her. After leaning in and touching her snout, he creeps away, followed by the female. When she touches the base of his tail with her snout, he releases a sperm packet (spermatophore) and blocks the female's path so she picks it up with her cloaca. Several rounds of spermatophore deposition may follow. Males frequently interfere with displays of rivals. Experiments suggest that it is mainly male pheromones that trigger mating behaviour in females, while colour and other visual cues are less relevant. In a breeding season, a male can produce more than 48 spermatophores, and offspring from one female usually have several fathers.

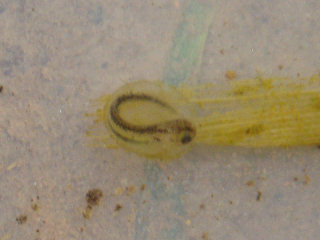
Egg with larva just before hatching

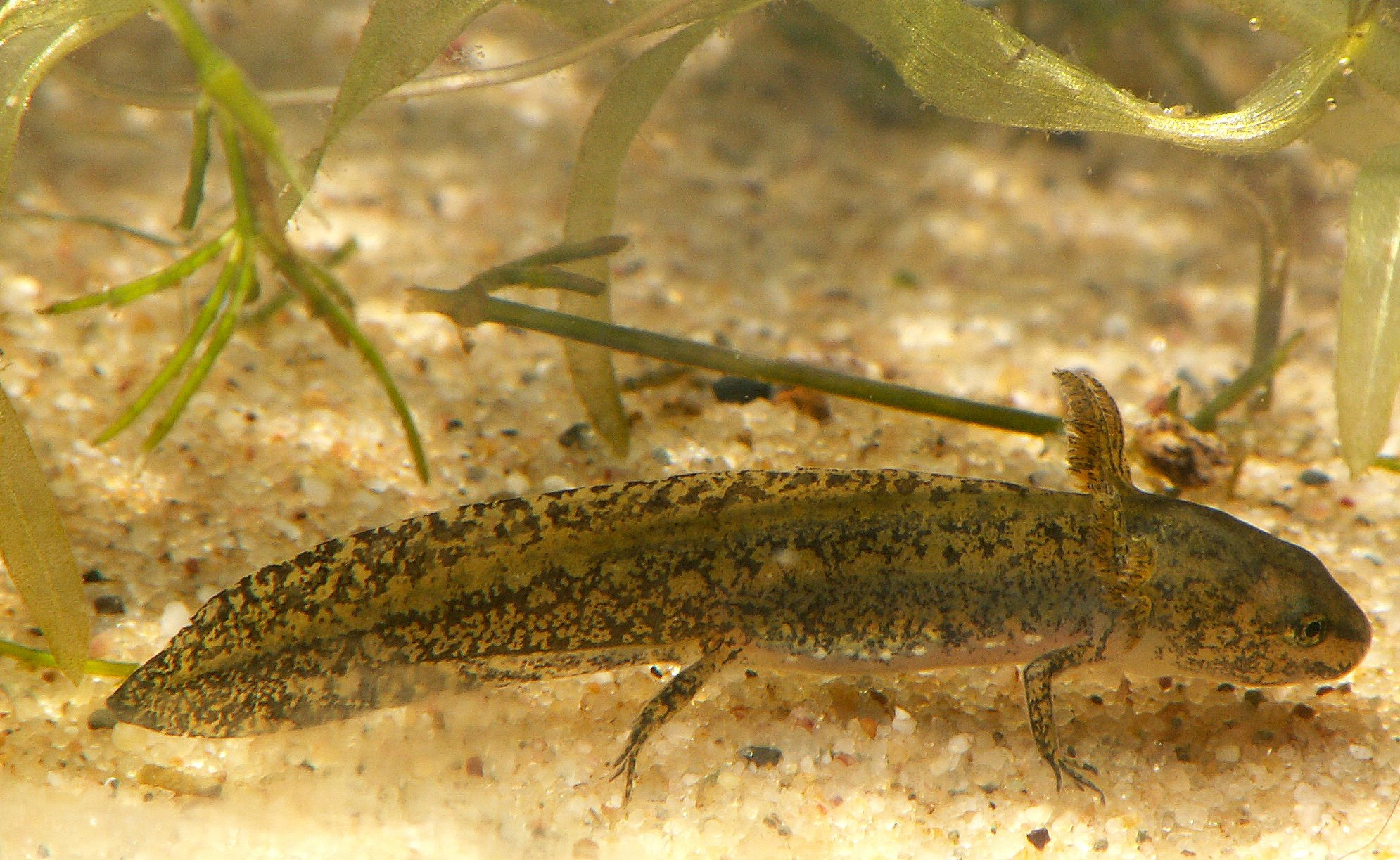
Larva with fore- and hindlegs developed

Females wrap their eggs in leaves of water plants for protection, preferring leaves closer to the surface where temperatures are higher. Where no plants are available, they may also use leaf litter, dead wood or stones for egg deposition. They can lay 70–390 eggs in a season, which are light grey-brown and 1.5–1.7 mm in diameter (2.5–3 mm including the jelly capsule). Incubation time is longer under cold conditions, but larvae typically hatch after two to four weeks. The larvae are benthic, staying in general close to the bottom of the water body. Metamorphosis occurs after around three months, again depending on temperature, but some larvae overwinter and metamorphose only in the next year.

=== Paedomorphy ===
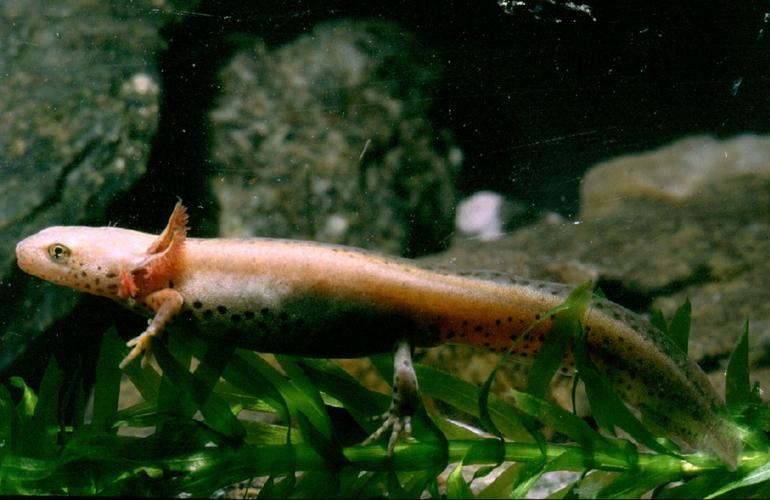
Paedomorphic adult of subspecies I. a. apuana

Paedomorphy, where adults do not metamorphose and instead retain their gills and stay aquatic, is more common in the alpine newt than in other European newts. It is almost exclusively found in the southern part of the range (but not in the Cantabrian subspecies, I. a. cyreni). Paedomorphic adults are paler in colour than metamorphic ones. Only part of a population is usually paedomorphic, and metamorphosis can follow if the pool dries out. Paedomorphic and metamorphic newts sometimes prefer different prey, but they do interbreed. Overall, paedomorphy appears to be a facultative strategy under particular conditions that are not fully understood.

=== Diet, predators and parasites ===
Alpine newts are diet generalists, taking mainly different invertebrates as prey. Larvae and adults living in the water eat for example plankton, molluscs, larvae of insects such as chironomids, crustaceans such as water fleas, ostracods, or amphipods, and terrestrial insects falling on the surface. Amphibian eggs and larvae, including of their own species, are also eaten. Prey on land includes insects, worms, spiders and woodlice.

Predators of adult alpine newts are snakes such as the grass snake, fish such as trout, birds such as herons or ducks, and mammals such as hedgehogs, martens or shrews. Under water, large diving beetles (Dytiscus) can prey on newts, while small efts on land may be predated by ground beetles (Carabus). For eggs and larvae, diving beetles, fish, dragonfly larvae, and other newts are the main enemies.Predator pressure can affect the phenotype of developing alpine newts. In an experiment, alpine newt larvae raised in the presence of caged dragonfly larvae took longer to emerge from the larval stage, growing slower and emerging later in the season than newt larvae that did not experience predator presence. They also exhibited traits such as darker coloration, larger body size, a proportionally larger head and tail, and more wary behavior than their predator-free counterparts.

Threatened adult newts often take on a defensive position, where they expose the warning colour of their belly by bending backwards or raising their tail and secrete a milky substance. Only trace amounts of the poison tetrodotoxin, abundant in the North American Pacific newts (Taricha), have been found in the alpine newt. They also sometimes produce sounds, whose function is unknown. When adult newts are in the presence of a predator, they tend to flee a majority of the time. However, the decision of whether or not to flee can depend on the newt's sex and temperature. In an experiment, female newts fled more often and at a greater speed over a greater range of temperatures than males, who tended to flee at a slower speed and remained immobile while secreting tetrodotoxin when the temperature was outside of the normal range.

Parasites include parasitic worms, leeches, the ciliate Balantidium elongatum, and potentially toadflies. A ranavirus transmitted to alpine newts from midwife toads in Spain caused bleeding and necrosis. The chytridiomycosis-causing fungus Batrachochytrium dendrobatidis has been found in wild populations, and the emerging B. salamandrivorans was lethal for alpine newts in laboratory experiments.

== Captivity ==
Several subspecies of the alpine newt have been bred in captivity, including a population from Prokoško Lake in Bosnia that is now probably extinct in the wild. Efts often return to the water after only one year. Captive individuals have reached an age of 15–20 years.

== Threats and conservation ==
Because of its overall large range and populations that are not severely fragmented, the alpine newt was classified as Least Concern on the IUCN Red List in 2009. The population trend, however, is "Decreasing", and the different geographic lineages, which may represent evolutionary significant units, have not been evaluated separately. The most comprehensive multi-marker phylogenetic analyses of the species suggest that the alpine newt consists of four evolutionary lineages, covering central Europe, Italy, Greece and the rest of the Balkans. Several populations in the Balkans, some of which have been described as subspecies of their own, are highly threatened or have even gone extinct.

Threats are similar to those affecting other newts and include mainly destruction and pollution of aquatic habitats. Beavers, previously widespread in Europe, were probably important in maintaining breeding sites. Introduction of fish, especially salmonids such as trout, and potentially crayfish is a significant threat that can eradicate populations from a breeding site. In the Montenegrin karst region, populations have declined as ponds created for cattle and human use were abandoned over the last decades. Lack of adequate, undisturbed land habitat (see section Habitats above) and dispersal corridors around and between breeding sites, is another problem.

== Effects as introduced species ==
Introduced alpine newts may pose a threat to native amphibians if they carry disease. A particular concern is chytridiomycosis, which was found in at least one introduced population in the United Kingdom. They can also carry ranavirus, as documented in an introduced population in the Catalonian Pre-Pyrenees (Spain). In New Zealand, the risk of spreading chytridiomycosis to endemic frogs has led to the introduced subspecies I. a. apuana being declared an "unwanted organism", and eradication being recommended. It has proven challenging to detect and remove the newts, but over 2000 individuals have been eradicated until 2015.
