= List of mountains in Slovenia =

Mountains of Slovenia are part of the Alps and of the Dinarides.

== Alps ==
The Alps in Slovenia can be divided into:

- Julian Alps (Slovene: Julijske Alpe) in the northwestern part of Slovenia. The highest peak is Mount Triglav - 2,864 metres (9,396 feet) above sea.
- Karawanks (Slovene: Karavanke)- a massive ridge that forms a natural boundary between Slovenia and Austria. The highest peak is Mt. Stol - 2,236 m ((7,336 feet).
- Kamnik–Savinja Alps (Slovene: Kamniško-Savinjske Alpe) lie to the south of Karawanks. The highest peak is Mt. Grintovec - 2,558 m (8,392 feet) above sea.

== Dinarides ==
In the Inner Carniola, the highest peaks are Veliki Snežnik (1,796 metres (5,892 ft), part of the Snežnik plateau and the highest non-Alpine peak in Slovenia, and Suhi vrh (1,313 metres (4,308 ft)), part of the Nanos plateau. They're both part of the Dinaric Alps, a mountain chain that spans towards the southeast. The highest peak is Snežnik.

Part of the Dinaric Alps are also the Gorjanci mountain range, and in the Slovenian Istria, Mt. Slavnik (1,028 m) and Mt. Vremščica (1,027 m).

== List of peaks ==
Listed below are all the mountains in Slovenia with a peak elevation above 2,000 metres (6,600 ft).

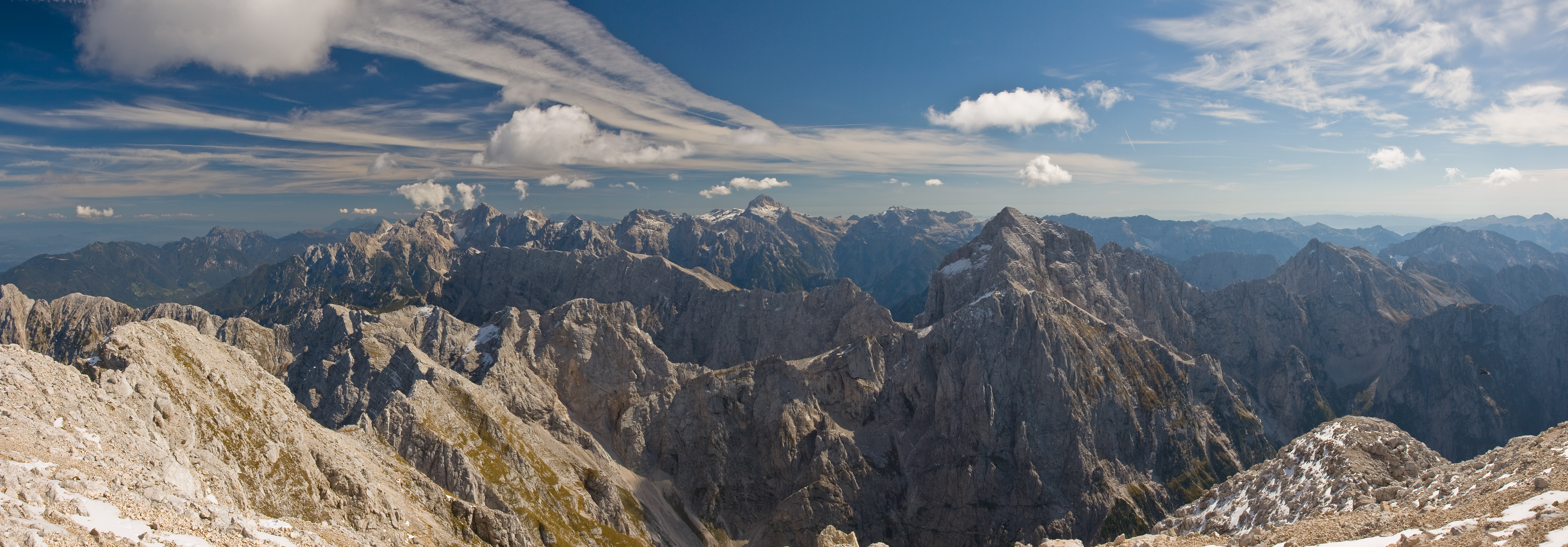
A view from Mangart towards the east. From left to right: Ponca, Špik's group, Mojstrovka, Škrlatica, Razor, Prisank, Travnik, Triglav, Kanjavec, Jalovec, Lepo špičje,...

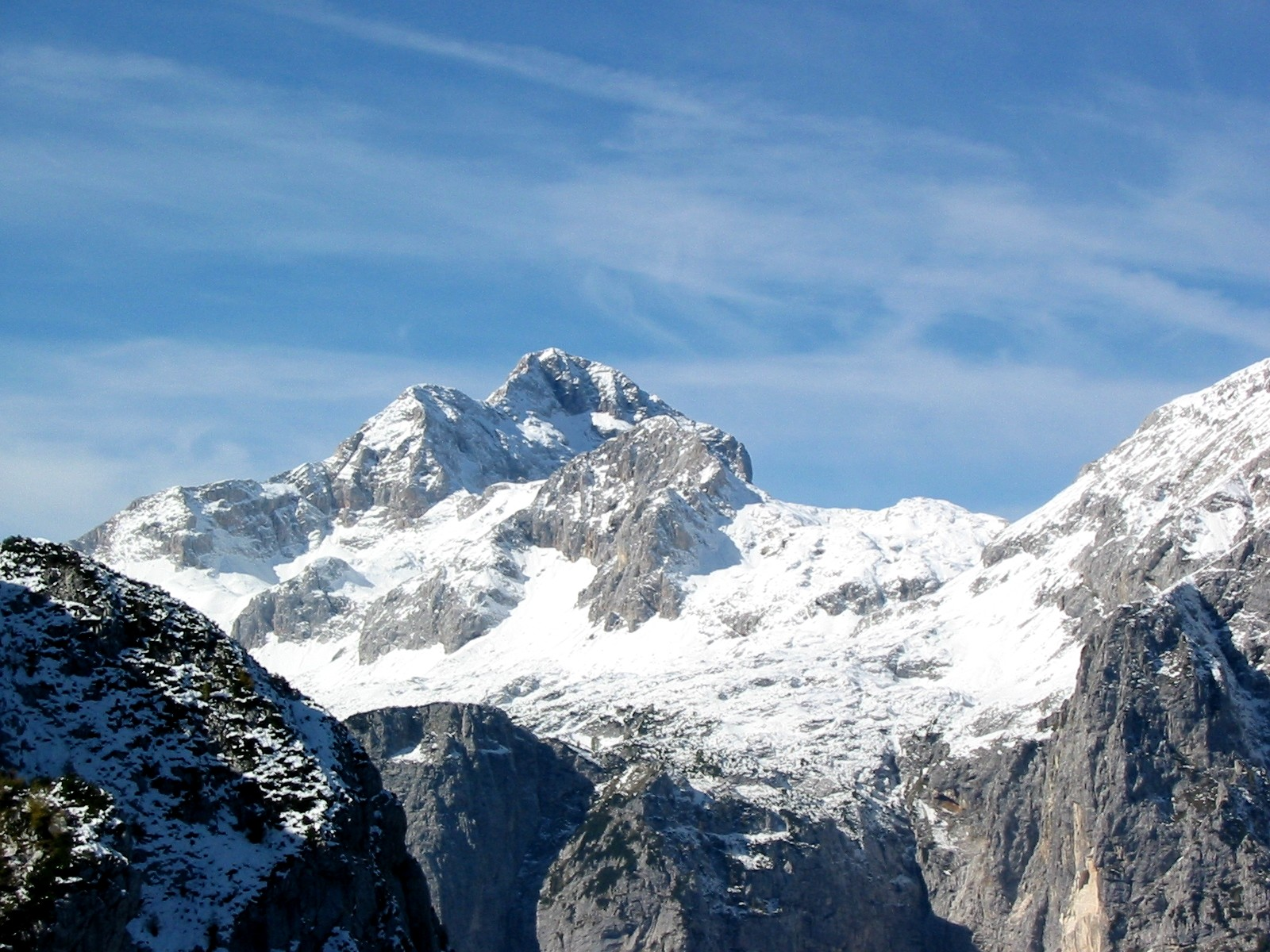
Triglav (2864 m) is Slovenia's highest peak and the symbol of Slovenes

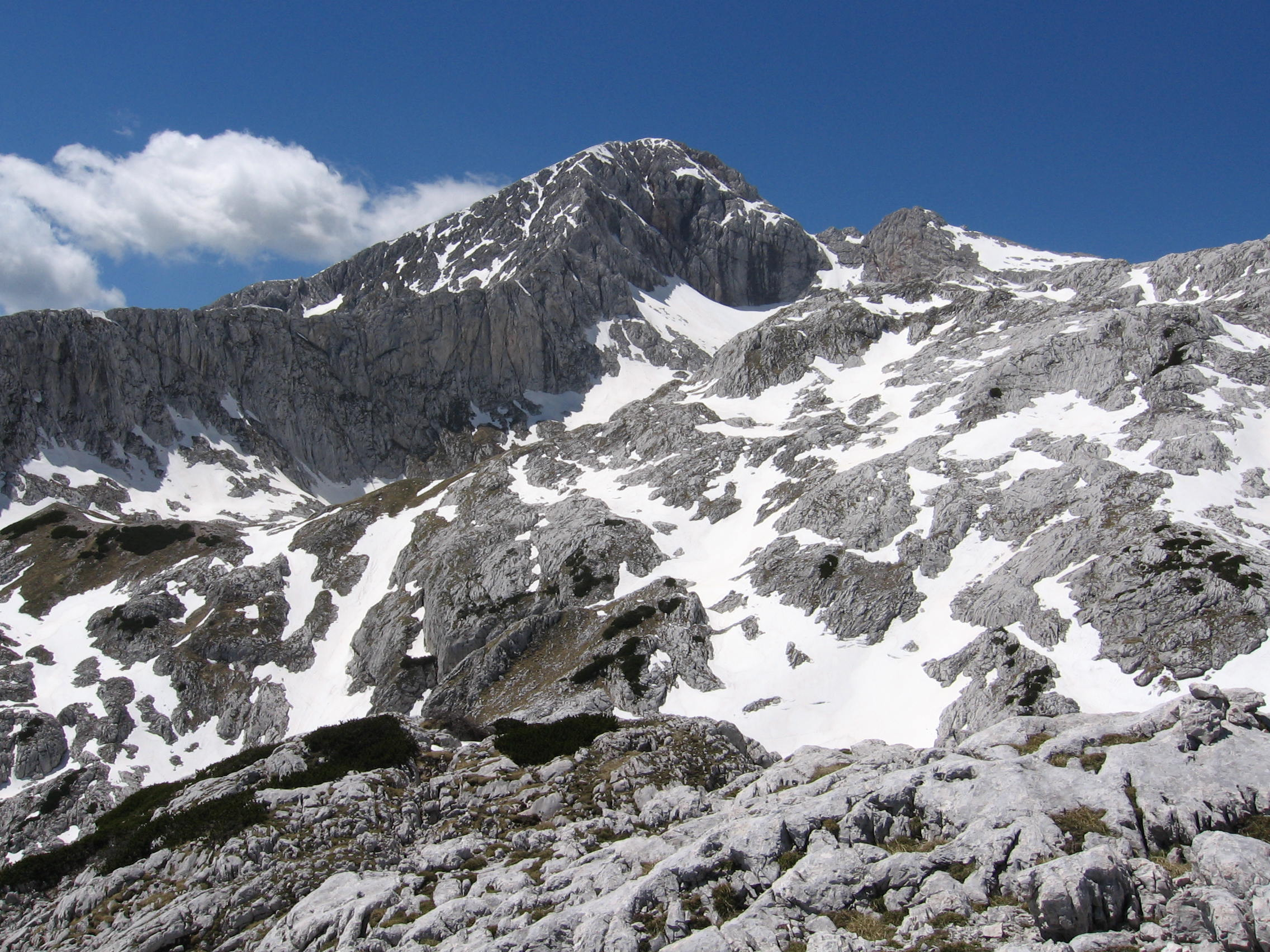
Grintovec (2558 m)

#	Peak	Height (m)	Mountain range	Municipality
1	Triglav	2864	Julian Alps	Bovec
2	Škrlatica	2740	Julian Alps	Kranjska Gora
3	Mali Triglav	2725	Julian Alps	Bovec
4	Mangart	2679	Julian Alps	Bovec
5	Visoki Rokav	2646	Julian Alps	Kobarid
6	Jalovec	2645	Julian Alps	Bovec
7	Veliki Oltar	2621	Julian Alps	Kranjska Gora
8	Velika (Martuljška) Ponca	2602	Julian Alps	Kranjska Gora
9	Razor	2601	Julian Alps	Bovec
10	Dolkova špica	2591	Julian Alps	Kranjska Gora
11	Srednji Rokav	2589	Julian Alps	Kranjska Gora
12	High Kanin	2587	Julian Alps	Bovec
13	Mali Kanin	2571	Julian Alps	Bovec
14	Kanjavec	2569	Julian Alps	Bovec
15	Rjavec	2568	Julian Alps	Bovec
16	Grintovec	2558	Kamnik–Savinja Alps	Preddvor
17	Glava v Zaplanji	2556	Julian Alps	
18	Prisojnik	2547	Julian Alps	Kranjska Gora
19	Rogljica	2547	Julian Alps	
20	Rakova špica	2545	Julian Alps	
21	Srednji Vršič	2543	Julian Alps	
22	Dovški križ	2542	Julian Alps	Kranjska Gora
23	Kredarica	2539	Julian Alps	Gorje
24	Spodnja Dolkova špica	2541	Julian Alps	
25	Kočna	2540	Kamnik–Savinja Alps	Preddvor
26	Rž	2538	Julian Alps	
27	Rjavina	2532	Julian Alps	Gorje
28	Skuta	2532	Kamnik–Savinja Alps	Jezersko
29	Kaninski Vršič	2530	Julian Alps	
30	Mali Oltar	2521	Julian Alps	
31	Kokrska Kočna	2520	Kamnik–Savinja Alps	
32	Mala (Martuljška) Ponca	2502	Julian Alps	
33	Stenar	2501	Julian Alps	
34	Spodnji Rokav	2500	Julian Alps	
35	Prestreljenik	2499	Julian Alps	
36	Široka peč	2497	Julian Alps	
37	Poprovec	2496	Julian Alps	
38	Vrh Žlebičev	2486		
39	Na Križu	2484	Kamnik–Savinja Alps	
40	Veliki Ozebnik	2480	Julian Alps	
41	Hudi Vršič	2478	Julian Alps	
42	Dolgi hrbet	2473	Kamnik–Savinja Alps	
43	Špik	2472	Julian Alps	
44	Zvoniki	2472		
45	Vrh Zelenic	2468	Julian Alps	
46	Mišeljski Konec	2464	Julian Alps	
47	Peči	2464		
48	Begunjski vrh	2461	Julian Alps	
49	Štruca	2457	Kamnik–Savinja Alps	
50	Kranjska Rinka	2453	Kamnik–Savinja Alps	
51	Planja	2453	Julian Alps	
52	Vrh Laške planje	2448		
53	Vršaki	2448	Julian Alps	
54	Škrnatarica	2448	Julian Alps	
55	Mali Grintovec	2447	Kamnik–Savinja Alps	
56	Pelc nad Klonicami (Pinja, Kloniški Pelc)	2442	Julian Alps	
57	Dovški Gamsovec	2440	Julian Alps	
58	Carinthia Mount Rinka (Cross)	2433	Kamnik–Savinja Alps	
59	Pod Kaninom	2429	Julian Alps	
60	Kukova špica	2427	Julian Alps	
61	Glava	2426	Julian Alps	
62	Črni vogel	2422		
63	(Zadnjiški) Pihavec	2419	Julian Alps	
64	Lipnica	2418		
65	Križ	2410	Julian Alps	
66	Visoka Vrbanova špica	2408	Julian Alps	
67	Lopa	2406	Julian Alps	
68	Gubno	2404	Julian Alps	
69	Veliko špičje	2398	Julian Alps	
70	Goličica	2394	Julian Alps	
71	Planjava	2394	Kamnik–Savinja Alps	
72	Turn pod Razorjem	2394	Julian Alps	
73	Cmir	2393	Julian Alps	
74	Koritniški Mali Mangart	2393	Julian Alps	
75	Bovški Gamsovec	2392	Julian Alps	
76	Zadnji Prisank	2392	Julian Alps	
77	Debeli vrh	2390		
78	Veliki Pelc	2388	Julian Alps	
79	Vrh Hribaric	2388	Julian Alps	
80	Šplevta	2382	Julian Alps	
81	Turn pod Črnim voglom	2380		
82	Travnik	2379	Julian Alps	
83	Kotova špica	2376	Julian Alps	
84	Štajerska Rinka	2374	Kamnik–Savinja Alps	
85	Kucelj	2372		
86	Vrh Osojnic	2371		
87	Velika Mojstrovka	2366	Julian Alps	
88	Kriški rob	2366		
89	Glava za žlebom	2365		
90	Rjavčeve glave	2365		
91	Vrh nad Kamnom (Pihavec)	2365	Julian Alps	
92	Vrh Snežne konte	2361	Julian Alps	
93	Skutniki	2360		
94	Šmarjetna glava	2358	Julian Alps	
95	Plaski Vogel	2356	Julian Alps	
96	Spodnji Stenar	2356	Julian Alps	
97	Zadnja Mojstrovka	2354	Julian Alps	
98	Mišelj vrh	2350	Julian Alps	
99	Ojstrica	2350	Kamnik–Savinja Alps	
100	Kol	2350	Julian Alps	
101	V Koncu špica	2350		
102	Bavški Grintavec	2347	Julian Alps	
103	Briceljk	2346	Julian Alps	
104	Hudi Vršič	2344	Julian Alps	
105	Vevnica	2340	Julian Alps	
106	Grdi Vršič	2340	Julian Alps	
107	Srednji Pelc	2338	Julian Alps	
108	Vrh Žlebi	2335		
109	Velika Črnelska špica	2332	Julian Alps	
110	Mala Mojstrovka	2332	Julian Alps	
111	Škodela	2331		
112	Zadnji Vogel	2327	Julian Alps	
113	Grdi Vršič	2327		
114	Vrh Labrja	2326		
115	Mali Ozebnik	2324		
116	Turn pod Laško planjo	2323		
117	Velika Zelnarica	2320	Julian Alps	
118	Zadnji Pelc	2315	Julian Alps	
119	Kamen	2315		
120	Vzhodne glave	2314	Julian Alps	
121	Malo špičje	2312	Julian Alps	
122	Kraj sten	2311		
123	Visoka glava	2311		
124	Mala Zelnarica	2310	Julian Alps	
125	Škednjovec	2309	Julian Alps	
126	Oltarji	2308	Julian Alps	
127	Šite	2305	Julian Alps	
128	Spodnja Vrbanova špica	2299	Julian Alps	
129	Konjske police	2297		
130	Mali Grintavec	2294		
131	Konjc	2289		
132	Mala Rinka	2289	Kamnik–Savinja Alps	
133	Vršiči pod Lopo	2285		
134	Frdamane police	2284	Julian Alps	
135	Veliki Talir	2281	Julian Alps	
136	Vrh Zelenic	2278	Julian Alps	
137	Tosc	2275	Julian Alps	
138	Na Nizkem	2275		
139	Visoka (Rateška) Ponca	2274	Julian Alps	
140	Mala Črnelska špica	2273	Julian Alps	
141	Mišeljska glava	2273	Julian Alps	
142	Šplevta	2272	Julian Alps	
143	Glave nad Grabnom	2268		
144	Slovenski turnc	2267	Julian Alps	
145	Nad Kuhinjo špica	2266		
146	Strug (Strmi)	2265	Julian Alps	
147	Prestreljeniški Vršič	2262	Julian Alps	
148	Morež	2261	Julian Alps	
149	Strugove špice	2260		
150	Rateški Mali Mangart	2259	Julian Alps	
151	Travnik	2256	Julian Alps	
152	Brana	2253	Kamnik–Savinja Alps	
153	Turska gora	2251	Kamnik–Savinja Alps	
154	Luknja peč	2249	Julian Alps	
155	Oblica	2246	Julian Alps	
156	Vrh Rup	2245		
157	Krn	2244	Julian Alps	
158	Lučka Baba	2244	Kamnik–Savinja Alps	
159	Veliki Draški vrh	2243	Julian Alps	
160	Zadnja Ponca	2242	Julian Alps	
161	Hudičev steber	2237		
162	Stol	2236	Karawanks	
163	Vrh Krnice	2234	Julian Alps	
164	Čelo	2228	Julian Alps	
165	Prevčev stolp	2228	Julian Alps	
166	Srednja Ponca	2228	Julian Alps	
167	Rob Velike Dnine	2228	Julian Alps	
168	Srednji Vogel	2227	Julian Alps	
169	Vrh nad Mužici	2227	Julian Alps	
170	Vernar	2225	Julian Alps	
171	Kalce Ridge	2224	Kamnik–Savinja Alps	
172	Šplevta (Pihavec)	2224	Julian Alps	
173	Dovški Pihavec	2216	Julian Alps	
174	Mali Prisank	2215	Julian Alps	
175	Kanceljni	2213	Julian Alps	
176	Rombon	2208	Julian Alps	
177	Cold Mountain	2203	Kamnik–Savinja Alps	
178	Kopice	2202		
179	Travnik (Strmi Nos)	2200		
180	Mali Stol	2198	Karawanks	
181	Špica v Planji	2198	Julian Alps	
182	Votli vrh	2197		
183	Bedinji vrh	2196		
184	(Vodnikov) Vršac	2194	Julian Alps	
185	Špiček	2192	Julian Alps	
186	Veliki kup	2192		
187	Mali Razor	2191	Julian Alps	
188	Kopica	2190		
189	Bavh	2186		
190	Nad steno	2186	Julian Alps	
191	Mali Pihavec	2185	Julian Alps	
192	Plešivec (Loška stena)	2184	Julian Alps	
193	Vrtača	2181	Karawanks	
194	Prvi Vogel	2181	Julian Alps	
195	Vrh nad Peski	2176	Julian Alps	
196	Mali Bedinji vrh	2175		
197	Mali Talir	2174	Julian Alps	
198	Skutnik	2172	Julian Alps	
199	Zelene čuklje	2170	Julian Alps	
200	Špičica	2169		
201	Brda	2169	Julian Alps	
202	Male Špice	2167	Julian Alps	
203	Veliki Stador	2165	Julian Alps	
204	Batognica	2164	Julian Alps	
205	Nizki vrh	2162		
206	Velika Baba	2160		
207	Visoka špica	2159		
208	Turn pod Stenarjem	2154	Julian Alps	
209	Vrh Brda	2152	Julian Alps	
210	Kepa (Mittagskogel)	2145	Karawanks	
211	Krnčica	2142		
212	Travniški rob	2142		
213	Sravnik	2140		
214	Kljuka	2137		
215	Sklep	2136		
216	Teme	2136		
217	Srednji vrh	2134	Julian Alps	
218	Košutnikov turn	2133	Karawanks	
219	Skala	2133	Julian Alps	
220	Mali Draški vrh	2132	Julian Alps	
221	Storžič	2132	Kamnik–Savinja Alps	
222	Pelc za Rušo	2133		
223	Glava za bajto	2131		
224	Velika Baba	2127		
225	Najvišji rob Zeleniških špic	2127	Julian Alps	
226	Jerebica	2126	Julian Alps	
227	Peca - Kordež Head	2126	Karawanks	
228	Macesje	2124	Karawanks	
229	Činkelman	2124	Julian Alps	
230	Veliki Babanski Skedenj	2121	Julian Alps	
231	Vrh Goleževice	2119		
232	Šmihelovec	2117	Julian Alps	
233	Krkotnik	2116		
234	Trentski Pelc	2116	Julian Alps	
235	Zadnja Lopa	2115		
236	Velika Zelenica	2114	Kamnik–Savinja Alps	
237	Veliki Jelenk	2114		
238	Velika Gnila glava	2114		
239	Vrh Male krnice	2114		
240	Mali Skedenj	2112		
241	Vršac	2112		
242	Veliki vrh	2110		
243	Končnikov vrh	2109	Karawanks	
244	Suhi vrh	2109		
245	(Goličica)	(2108)		
246	Vrh nad Rudo	2108		
247	Ledinski vrh	2108	Kamnik–Savinja Alps	
248	Celovška špica	2105	Karawanks	
249	Vrh Police	2105		
250	Dimniki	2104		
251	Ostrv	2104		
252	Vajnež	2102	Karawanks	
253	Koštrunovec	2102		
254	Veliki Grad	2102		
255	Goličica	2101	Julian Alps	
256	Srebrnjak	2100	Julian Alps	
257	Gladki lašt	2100		
258	Kogel	2100		
259	Debeli lašt	2098		
260	Cesar	2098	Julian Alps	
261	Kobila	2098		
262	Rušica	2096	Julian Alps	
263	Veliko Kladivo	2094	Karawanks	
264	Mrzli vrh	2094		
265	Planja	2092		
266	Velika Tičarica	2091	Julian Alps	
267	Veliki Pihavec	2090		
268	Zagorelec	2090		
269	Veliki vrh	2088	Karawanks	
270	Ogradi	2087	Julian Alps	
271	Nad Šitom glava	2087	Julian Alps	
272	Mala Gnila glava	2086		
273	Tolminski Kuk	2085	Julian Alps	
274	Zadnjiški Ozebnik	2084	Julian Alps	
275	Krofička	2083	Kamnik–Savinja Alps	
276	Užnik	2079		
277	Sleme (Vrtaško)	2077	Julian Alps	
278	Slatna	2077	Julian Alps	
279	Velika glava	2077		
280	Dovška Mala Kepa	2077		
281	Prevalski Stog	2075		
282	Tičarica	2075	Julian Alps	
283	Mali Pihavec	2074		
284	Rigljica	2074	Julian Alps	
285	Skutnik	2074		
286	Mala Tičarica	2071	Julian Alps	
287	Gamsovke	2065		
288	Mali peski	2063		
289	Raduha	2062	Kamnik–Savinja Alps	
290	Podrta gora	2061	Julian Alps	
291	Krnička gora	2061		
292	Veliki vrh (Begunjščica)	2060	Karawanks	
293	Kalška gora	2058	Kamnik–Savinja Alps	
294	Tolsta Košuta	2057	Karawanks	
295	Veliki Pršivec	2056		
296	Pri Banderi	2055		
297	Vrh nad Škrbino	2054	Julian Alps	
298	Zeleni vrh	2052		
299	Germlajt	2051		
300	Viševnik	2050	Julian Alps	
301	Jelenk	2050		
302	Votlo Sleme	2049	Julian Alps	
303	Veliko Ušje	2048		
304	Spodnja Šplevta	2046		
305	Tegoška gora	2044		
306	Veliki Lemež	2043	Julian Alps	
307	Jezerski Stog	2040	Julian Alps	
308	Turn	2040		
309	Na Pečeh	2039	Julian Alps	
310	Plaski Kuk	2038		
311	Malo Kladivo	2036	Karawanks	
312	Gubno	2035	Karawanks	
313	Kačarjeva glava	2034		
314	Veliki Konj	2034		
315	Kreda	2033		
316	Srednji vrh	2032	Julian Alps	
317	Mala Raduha	2029	Kamnik–Savinja Alps	
318	Travnik	2029		
319	Kurica	2028		
320	Poljske device	2028		
321	Palec	2026	Karawanks	
322	Obliči	2026		
323	Pungrat	2025		
324	Stador	2025		
325	Vrh Ribežnov (Ribežnov vrh)	2024		
326	Zelenjak	2024	Karawanks	
327	Lučki Dedec	2023	Kamnik–Savinja Alps	
328	Eva	2019	Julian Alps	
329	Mala Kalška gora	2019		
330	Mala Baba	2018		
331	Mala Ojstrica	2017	Kamnik–Savinja Alps	
332	Mali vrh	2017		
333	Velika Baba	2016		
334	Mali vrh	2015		
335	Debela peč	2014	Julian Alps	
336	Potoški Stol	2014	Karawanks	
337	Vrh konte	2014	Julian Alps	
338	Škofič	2013	Julian Alps	
339	Adam	2012	Julian Alps	
340	Lopatnik	2012	Julian Alps	
341	Brda	2009		
342	Krivi rob	2009		
343	Mahavšček	2008	Julian Alps	
344	Plešivec	2008		
345	Rušje	2008		
346	Grad	2008		
347	Malo Ušje	2007		
348	Glava pod Planjo	2006		
349	Ablanca	2004	Julian Alps	
350	Lanževica	2003	Julian Alps	
351	Kal	2001	Julian Alps	
352	Toplar	2000	Karawanks	

=== Notable peaks below 2000m ===
Peak	Mountain range	Height (m)
Rodica	Julian Alps	1966
Črna Prst	Julian Alps	1844
Mojstrovica	Karawanks	1816
Big Snežnik	Snežnik	1796
Mount St. Ursula	Karawanks	1699
Ratitovec	Julian Alps	1679
Porezen	Škofja Loka Hills	1630
Blegoš	Škofja Loka Hills	1562
Black Peak	Pohorje	1543
Big Kopa	Pohorje	1542
Peč	Karawanks	1509
Dedna gora	Dinaric Alps	1293
Pleša	Nanos	1260
Kucelj on Čaven	Trnovo Forest Plateau	1237
Kum	Posavje Hills	1219
Logar kogel	Gorjanci	1126
Mrzlica	Posavje Hills	1122
Krim	Krim Hills	1107
Rog	Kočevje Rog	1099
Mount Mirna	Kočevje Rog	1047
Slavnik	Slavnik - Čičarija	1028
Big Javornik	Bohor	1024
Boč	Konjice–Boč Hills	978
Donačka gora	Konjice–Boč Hills	882
Sotina Hill	Goričko	418
