= Mangart Saddle =

Mountain pass in Slovenia

- Mangartsko sedlo / Mangrtsko sedlo
- Mangart Pass
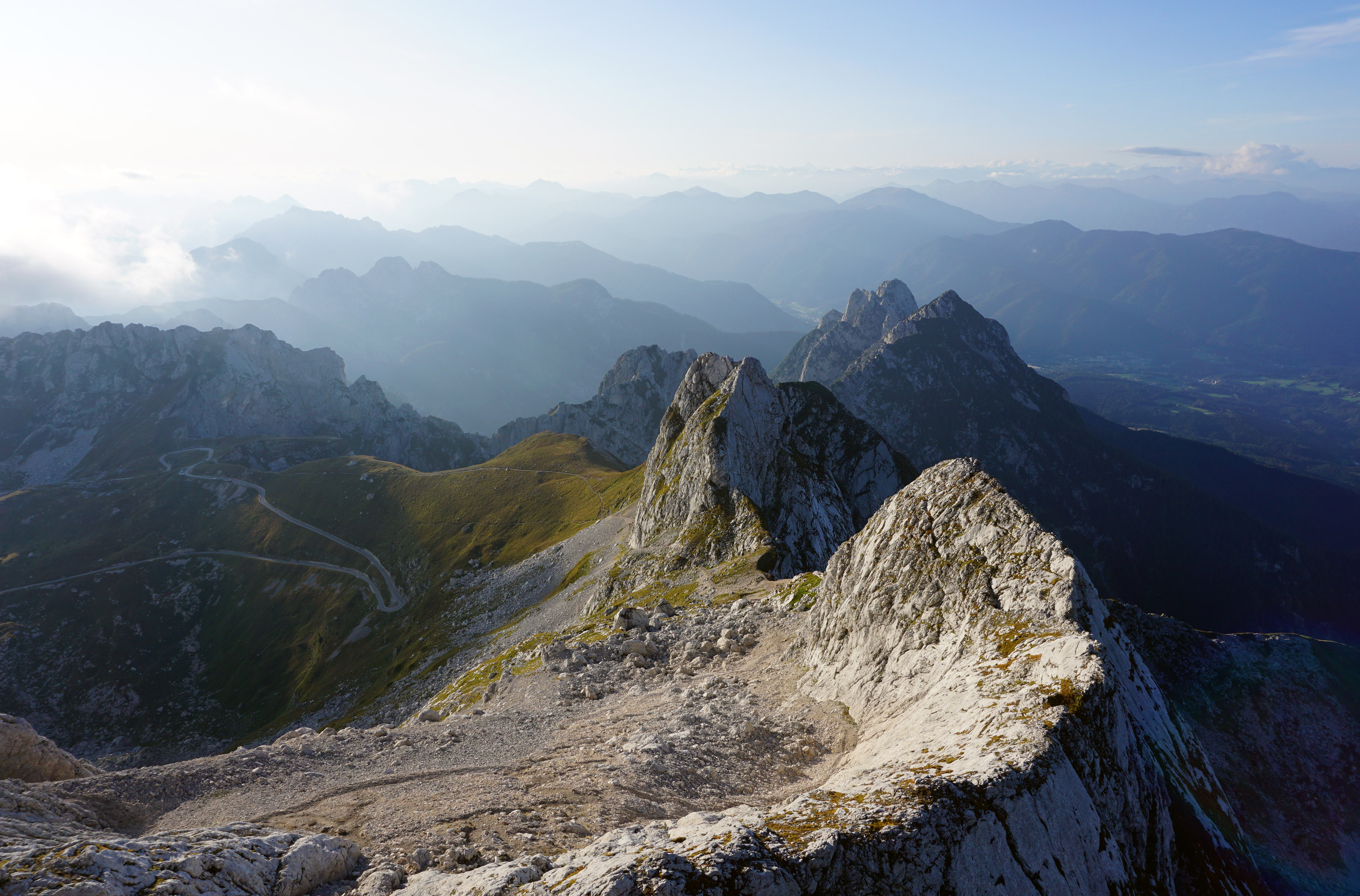
- Mangart Saddle

- Location within Slovenia
- Elevation: 2,072 m (6,798 ft)
- Traversed by: Mangart Road (Mangartska cesta)

Third Approach
- Location: Slovenia
- Range: Julian Alps
- Coordinates: 46.441°N 13.664°E

Mangart Saddle or the Mangart Pass (Slovene: Mangartsko sedlo or Mangrtsko sedlo) is a mountain saddle in the Julian Alps in northwestern Slovenia. It has an elevation of 2,072 metres (6,798 ft). It is the most common starting point for the ascent of Mt. Mangart (2,679 m or 8,789 ft). The Mangart Road (Mangartska cesta) that leads over Mangart Saddle, with its elevation of 2,055 m (6,742 ft), has a number of turns and is the highest-lying road in Slovenia. It was built in 1938. The Mangart Pass offers a view towards the Log Koritnica Valley in Slovenia to the south and the Lakes of Fusine in Italy to the north. The Mangart Saddle Lodge (koča na Mangrtskem sedlu) lies under the saddle. The saddle was the scenery of the film Let's Go Our Own Way. Mangart Saddle is also known as the finding place of manganese nodules from the Early Jurassic period.
