= Podgorje, Koper =

Podgorje Piedimonte d'Istria
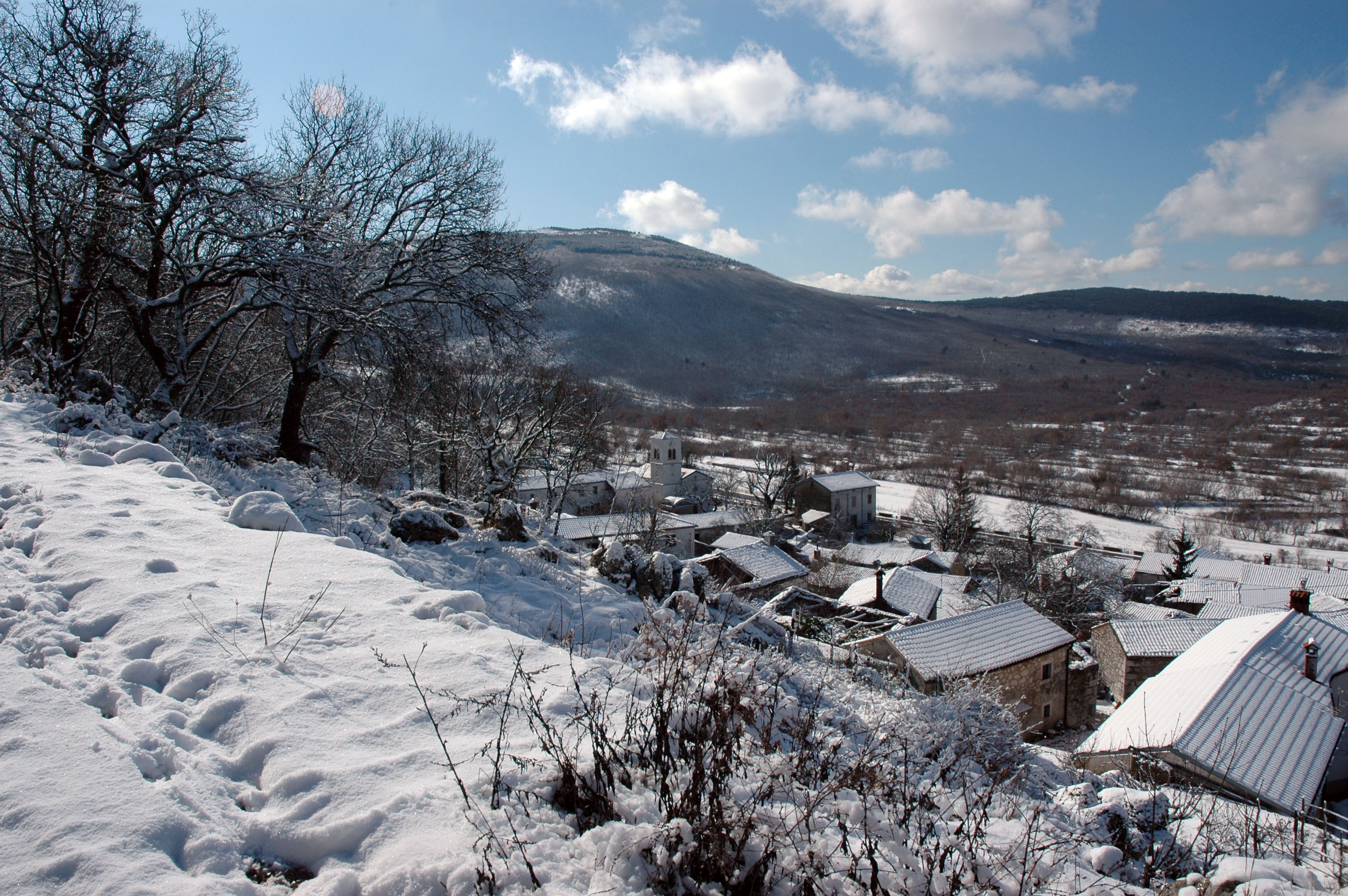

- Location in Slovenia
- Coordinates: 45°31′40.58″N 13°57′8.97″E
- Country: Slovenia
- Traditional region: Littoral
- Statistical region: Coastal–Karst
- Municipality: Koper

Area
  - Total: 18.19 km^{2} (7.02 sq mi)
- Elevation: 505.9 m (1,660 ft)

Population (2002)
  - Total: 152

Podgorje (pronounced [pɔdˈɡoːɾjɛ]; Italian: Piedimonte di Taiano, Piedimonte d'Istria) is a village in the City Municipality of Koper in the Littoral region of Slovenia on the border with Croatia.

== Geography ==
The village is located below Mount Slavnik (1,028 m), the highest peak in Slovenian Istria. The location of the village is reflected in its name, which literally means 'below the mountain'.

== Mass graves ==
Podgorje is the site of two known mass graves associated with the Second World War. The Vrženca Mass Grave (Slovene: Grobišče Vrženca) is located 1.2 km southwest of Podgorje and 1.2 km northwest of the summit of Kojnik Hill, on the east edge of a meadow next to the woods. Spelunkers found human remains at the site; the remains were collected in 1992 and were reburied in the Koper cemetery in 2004. The Podgorje 6 Cave Mass Grave (Grobišče Jama Podgorje 6) is located on the steep slope of a small valley in the Jančarija area in the foothills of Mount Slavnik. It contains the remains of undetermined victims. The remains of two people were collected from the grave in July 1992 and were reburied in the Koper cemetery in 2004.

== Church ==
The parish church in the settlement is dedicated to Saint Sabbas.

== Notable people ==
Notable people that were born or lived in Podgorje include:

- Zlatko Dedič (born 1984), football player
