= Jalovec (mountain) =

Mountain in Slovenia

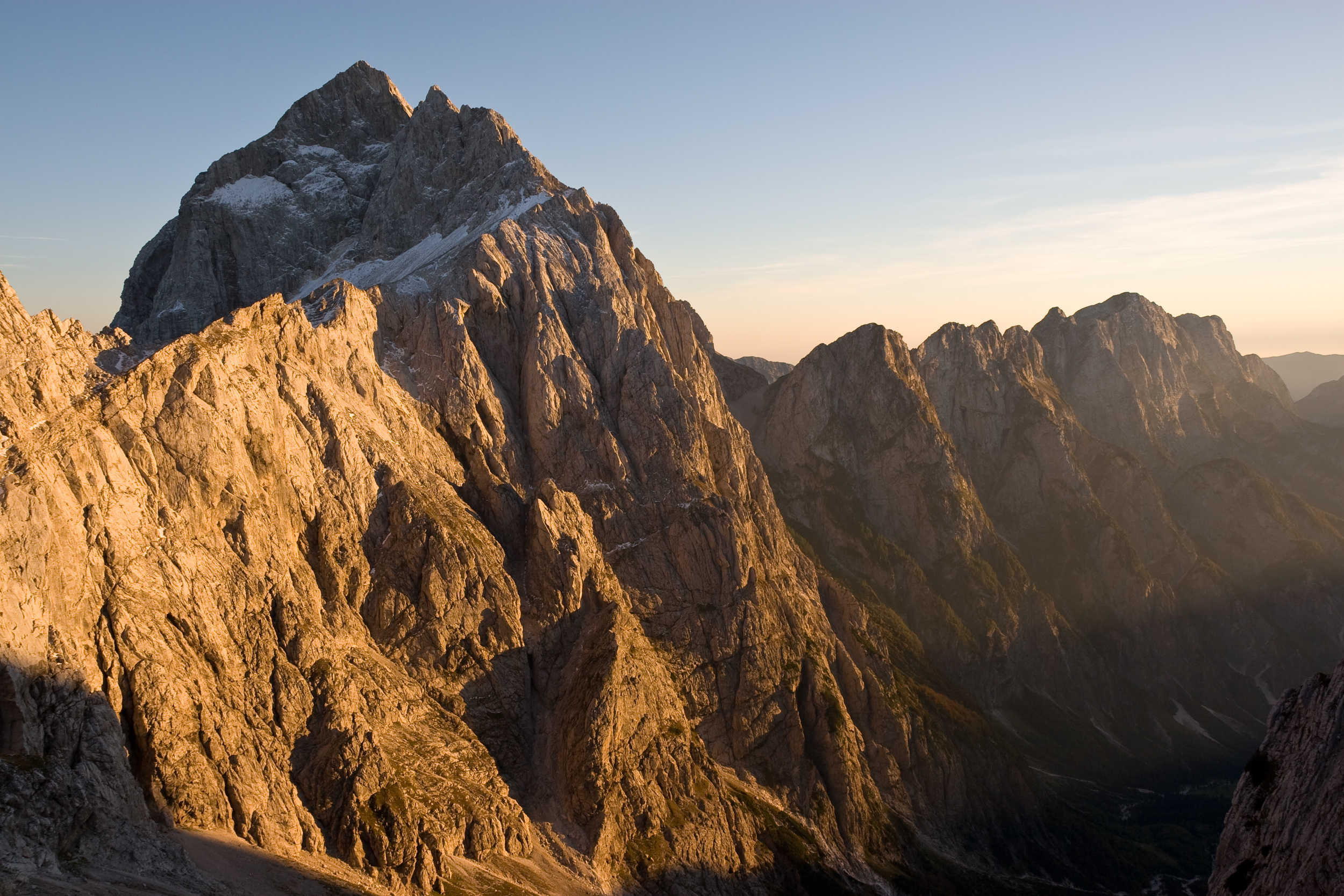
- The north face of Jalovec

Highest point
- Elevation: 2,645 m (8,678 ft)
- Prominence: 511 m (1,677 ft)
- Coordinates: 46°25′N 13°41′E

Geography
- Location within Alps
- Location: Slovenia
- Parent range: Julian Alps

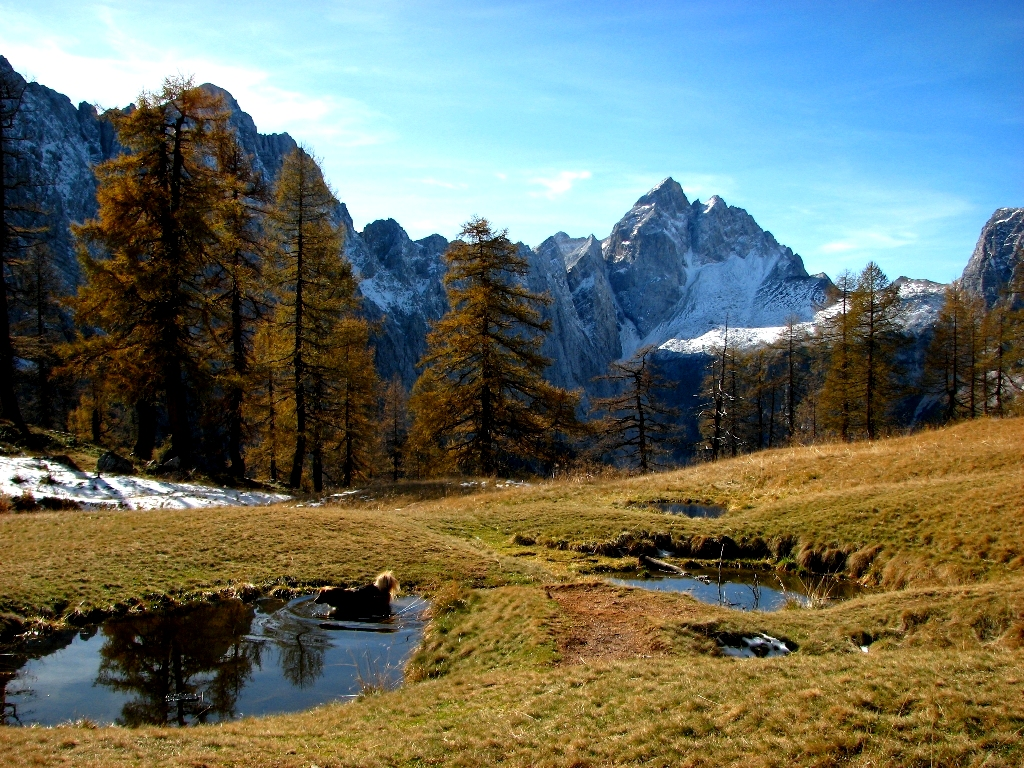
Mount Jalovec seen from Mount Sleme

Mount Jalovec (pronounced [ˈjaːlɔʋəts]; Italian: Monte Gialuz, Friulian: Jaluz) is a mountain in the Julian Alps. With an elevation of 2,645 m, it is the sixth-highest peak in Slovenia. It stands between the Tamar, Koritnica, and Trenta Alpine valleys. Nearby peaks include Mangart to the west, Travnik and Mojstrovka to the east, and Ponce to the north. The Log Cliff (Slovene: Loška stena, Italian: Parete di Bretto) stands immediately southwest of Mount Jalovec.

== Name ==
Mount Jalovec was attested in written sources as early as 1763–87 as Jellauz and Jelauz. The name is derived from the Slovene adjective jalov 'barren, infertile', referring to the lack of vegetation on the slopes of the mountain.

== See also ==
- List of mountains in Slovenia
- Julian Alps

== Bibliography ==
- Poljak, Željko (February 1959). "Jalovec". Kazalo za "Hrvatski planinar" i "Naše planine" 1898—1958 (PDF). Naše planine (in Croatian). Vol. XI. p. 28. ISSN 0354-0650.
