= Prestreljenik =

Mountain in Slovenia

- Monte Forato
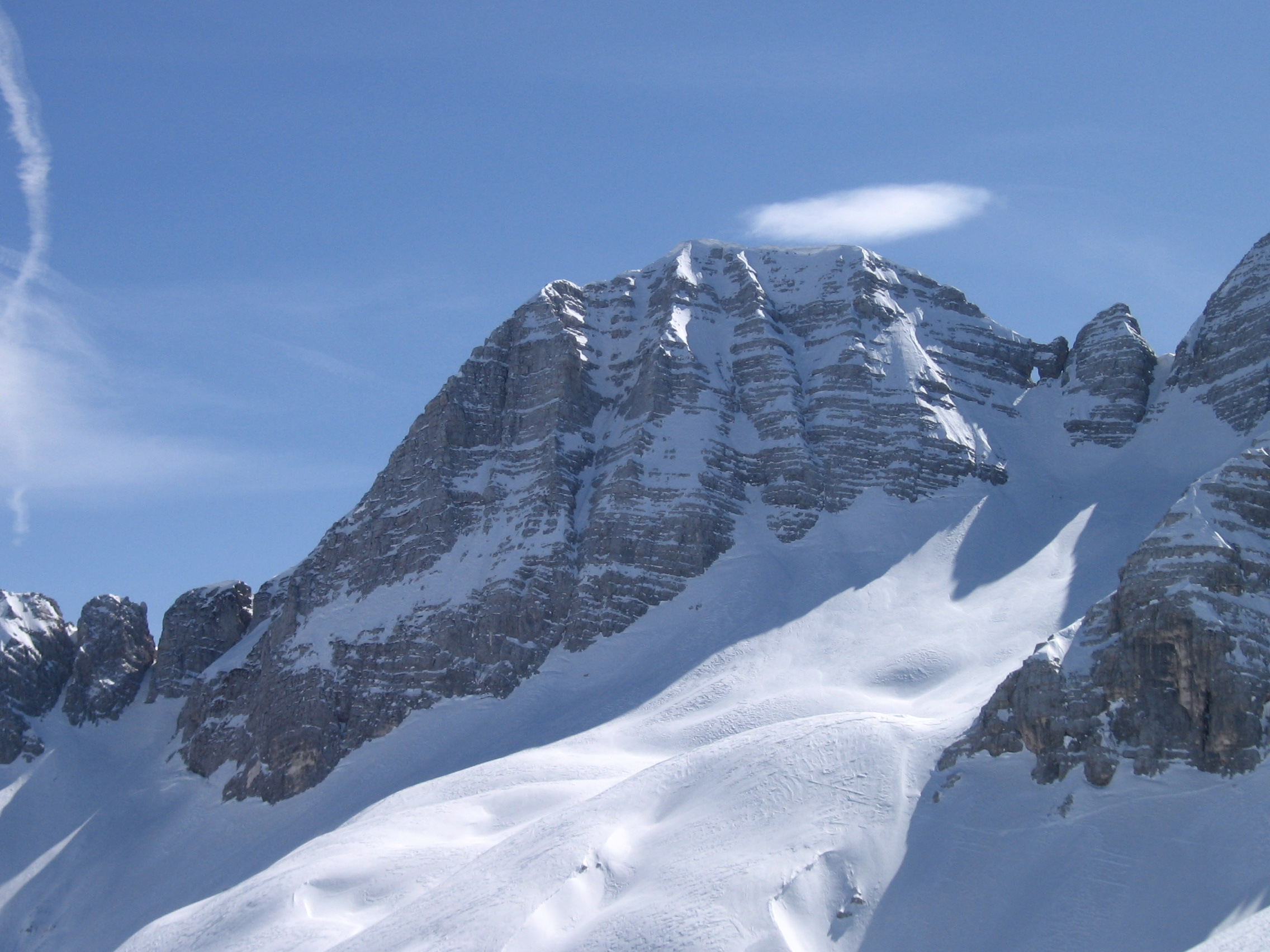

Highest point
- Elevation: 2,499 m (8,199 ft)
- Listing: Mountains in Slovenia
- Coordinates: 46°21′42″N 13°28′19″E

Geography
- Location within Alps Location within Slovenia Location within Italy
- Countries: Slovenia and Italy
- Parent range: Julian Alps

Prestreljenik (Italian: Monte Forato) is a 2,499-meter (8,199 ft) mountain in the western range of the Julian Alps. The summit of the mountain lies on the Italian–Slovenian border, which runs along the Kanin group ridge in the area. The mountain's southern and northern slopes lie in the Slovenian municipality of Tolmin and the Italian commune of Udine, respectively.

The second-highest peak of the central part of the Kanin group, Prestreljenik is located about 2.5 km west of High Kanin / Canin Alto. It is best known for the "Window" (Okno), an erosion-arch feature located on its western ridge. This aperture is the source of both of the mountain's local endonyms, Prestreljenik ("shot-through" in Slovene) and Forato (Italian for "pierced").

The peak is accessible via the eastern ridge from the Petar Skalar Lodge, or—by a different route—via either Bovec or (crossing the Italian border) Sella Nevea and the Celso Gilberti Chalet. In winter, the peak is a popular destination for alpine skiers.

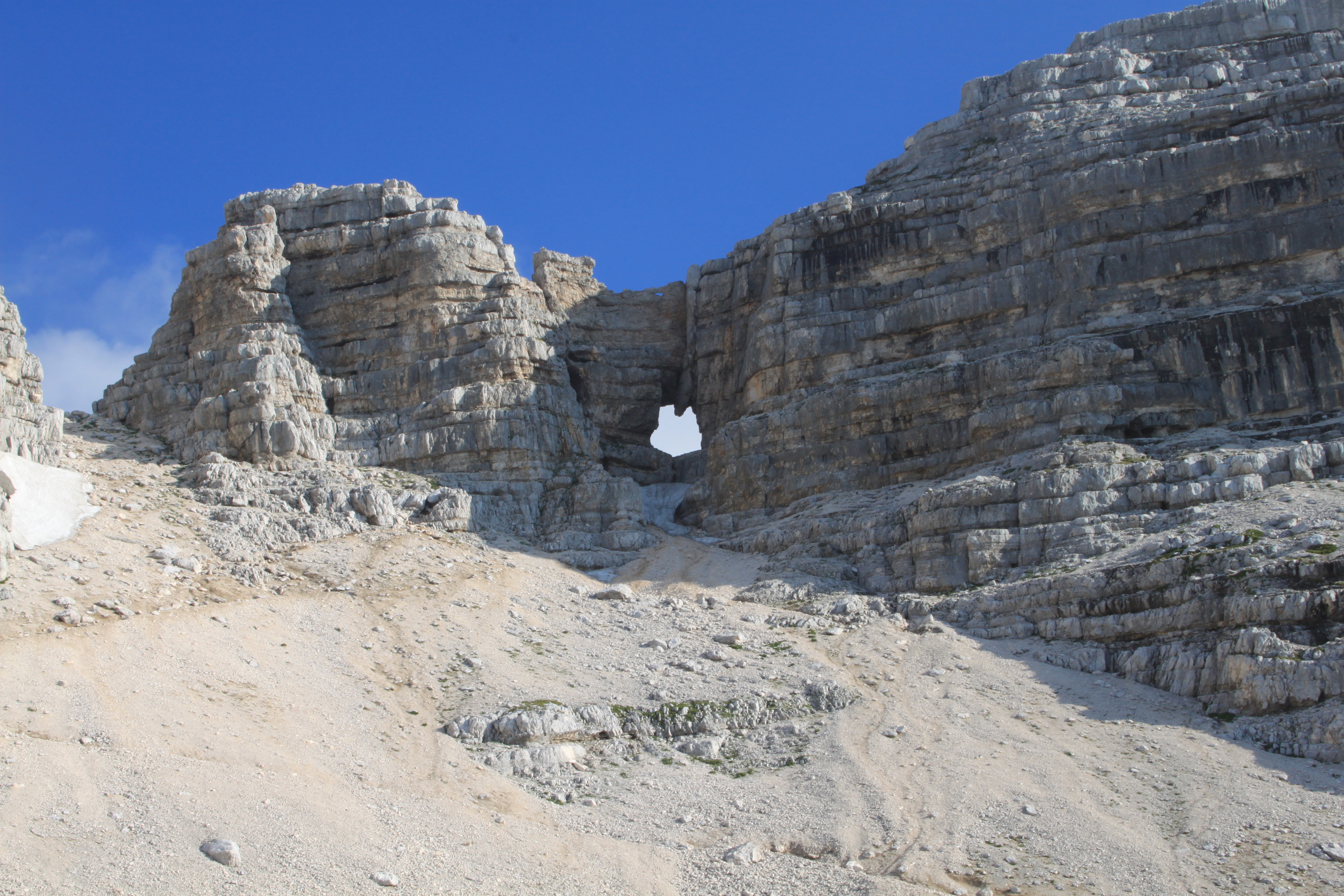
Window

== See also ==
- Julian Alps
- List of mountains in Slovenia
