= Špik =

Mountain in Slovenia

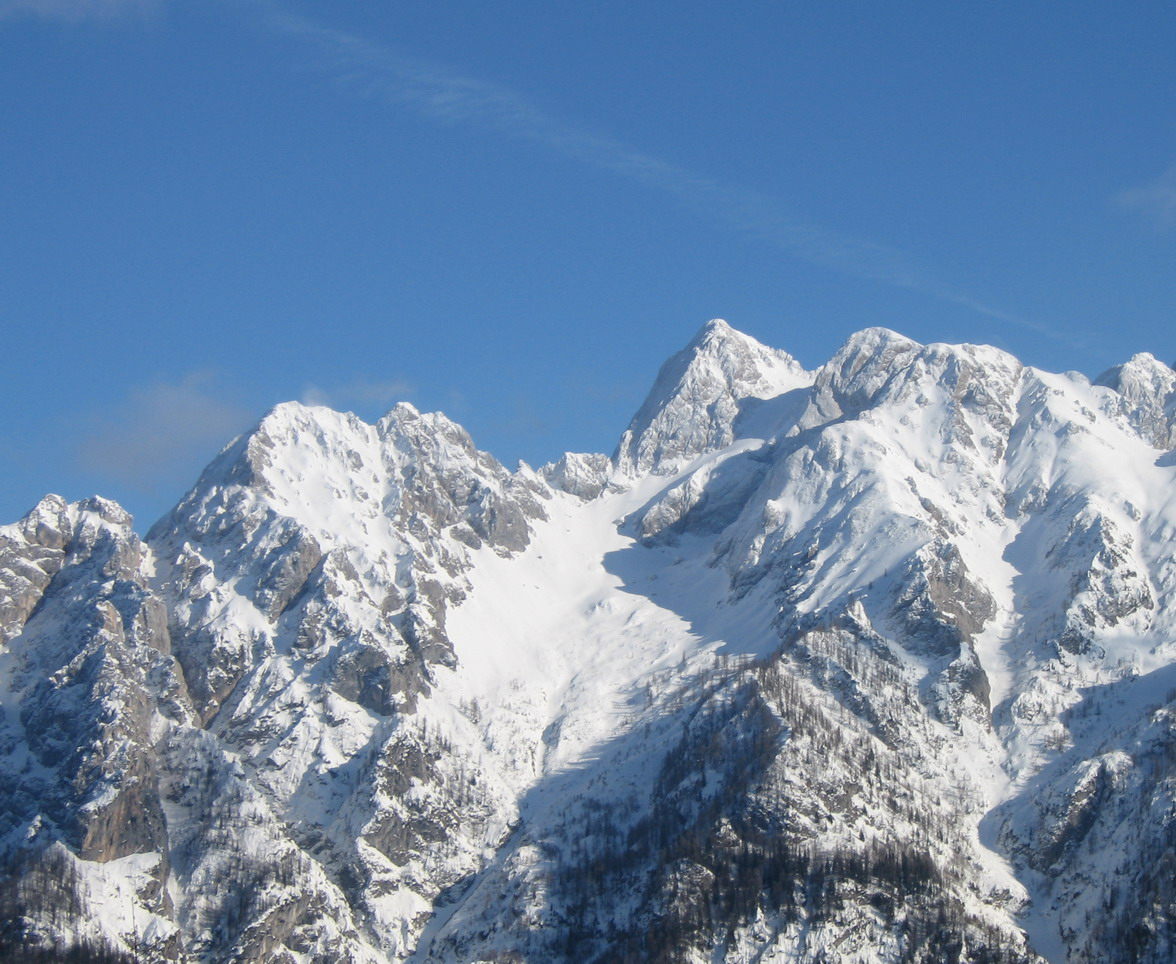
- Špik

Highest point
- Elevation: 2,472 m (8,110 ft)
- Prominence: 293 m
- Coordinates: 46°26′56″N 13°49′08″E

Geography
- Location within Alps
- Location: Slovenia
- Parent range: Julian Alps

Climbing
- First ascent: 1778

Špik is a mountain in Slovenia, the fourteenth-highest peak in the Julian Alps at 2,472 m (8110 feet).

== Name ==
The mountain's name is a borrowing from the German Spitze, ("peak" or "point", a cognate of the English spike), derived from the distinctively pointed shape of its summit.

Unusually, the mountain is commonly known as "Špik" rather than "Spitze" in Austria; this is because the toponym is not a Slavicized version of an original German name, but rather an archaic dialectical Slovene borrowing of the German common noun that was then independently applied to the mountain.

== Mountaineering ==
The two normal routes both start in the Krnica valley, and merge under the summit. The first transits the summit of Lipnica, while the other runs along the Kačji Graben ridge. The former has a few easy sections with fixed cables, while the latter is just a steep walk up. Both are snow-free in summer months. Ascent time from the valley to the summit is approximately five hours.

There are a number of mountain lodges around the heavily-trafficked Vrsič Pass nearby, but the chalet nearest to the start of the Špik routes is at Krnica (1113 m), 1304 m below the mountain's summit.

The settlement of Gozd–Martuljek lies directly below the imposing northern face of Špik, and is known for its views of its namesake triangular summit.

== History ==
In May 1952, a mountaineering accident on the northern face of Špik resulted in the deaths of five young mountaineers from Slovenska Bistrica, aged between 21 and 25.

== See also ==
- Mountains of Slovenia
