= Gozd–Martuljek =

Gozd–Martuljek Gozd - Martuljek Gozd (until 1955), Rute, Rovte
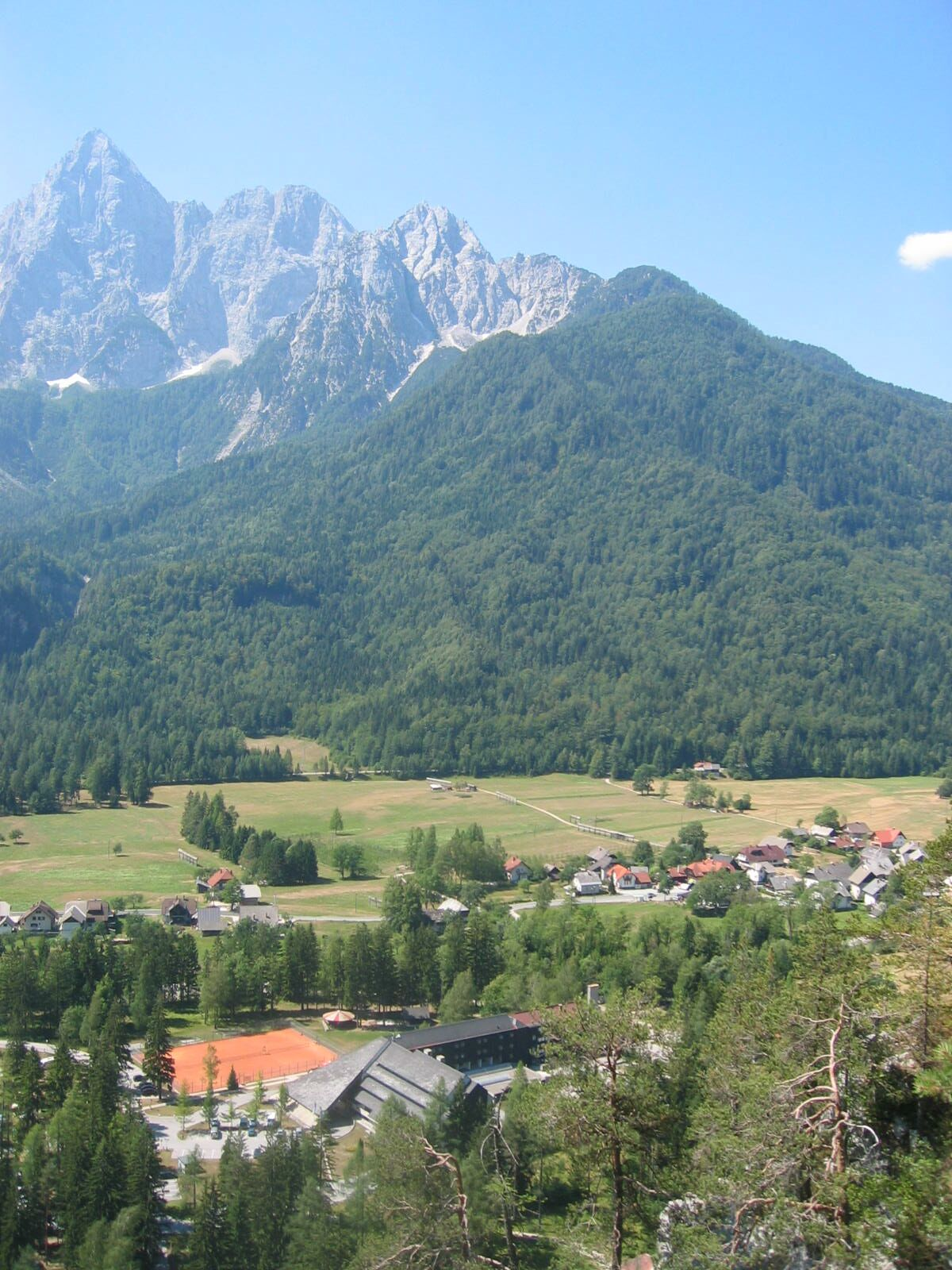

- Location in Slovenia
- Coordinates: 46°29′11.1″N 13°49′34.18″E
- Country: Slovenia
- Traditional region: Upper Carniola
- Statistical region: Upper Carniola
- Municipality: Kranjska Gora
- Elevation: 755.4 m (2,478 ft)

Population (2002)
  - Total: 624

Gozd–Martuljek (pronounced [ˈɡɔst maɾˈtuːljɛk], Slovene: Gozd - Martuljek, German: Wald) is a settlement in the Municipality of Kranjska Gora in the Upper Carniola region of Slovenia. It is a popular base for hiking and mountaineering excursions into the surrounding Julian Alps and Karawanks, and is particularly noted for its views of Mount Špik. The settlement's economy is based on dairy farming and tourism.

== Name and history ==
The settlement was historically known as Gozd, or sometimes Rute. The name of the settlement was changed from Gozd to Gozd–Martuljek in 1955. The new name was a compound of gozd 'forest' and Martuljek, the name of a local stream, itself derived from the Italian personal name Martullo.

The former name Rute survives in the settlement's informal division into Spodnje Rute (literally, 'lower Rute', located downstream on the Sava Dolinka River) and Zgornje Rute ('upper Rute', located upstream).

The settlement, which had been quite remote in previous centuries, became more accessible when the Jesenice–Tarvisio railway line was built in 1870, which was abandoned in 1966. It was then that the town reportedly got its current name, when a sign with the name Gozd was hung at the station at the opening of the line, and the name of Martuljek Creek was added next to it for differentiation.

The settlement has no church, but it contains a large Gothic Revival chapel dedicated to Our Lady of the Snows.

== Gallery ==
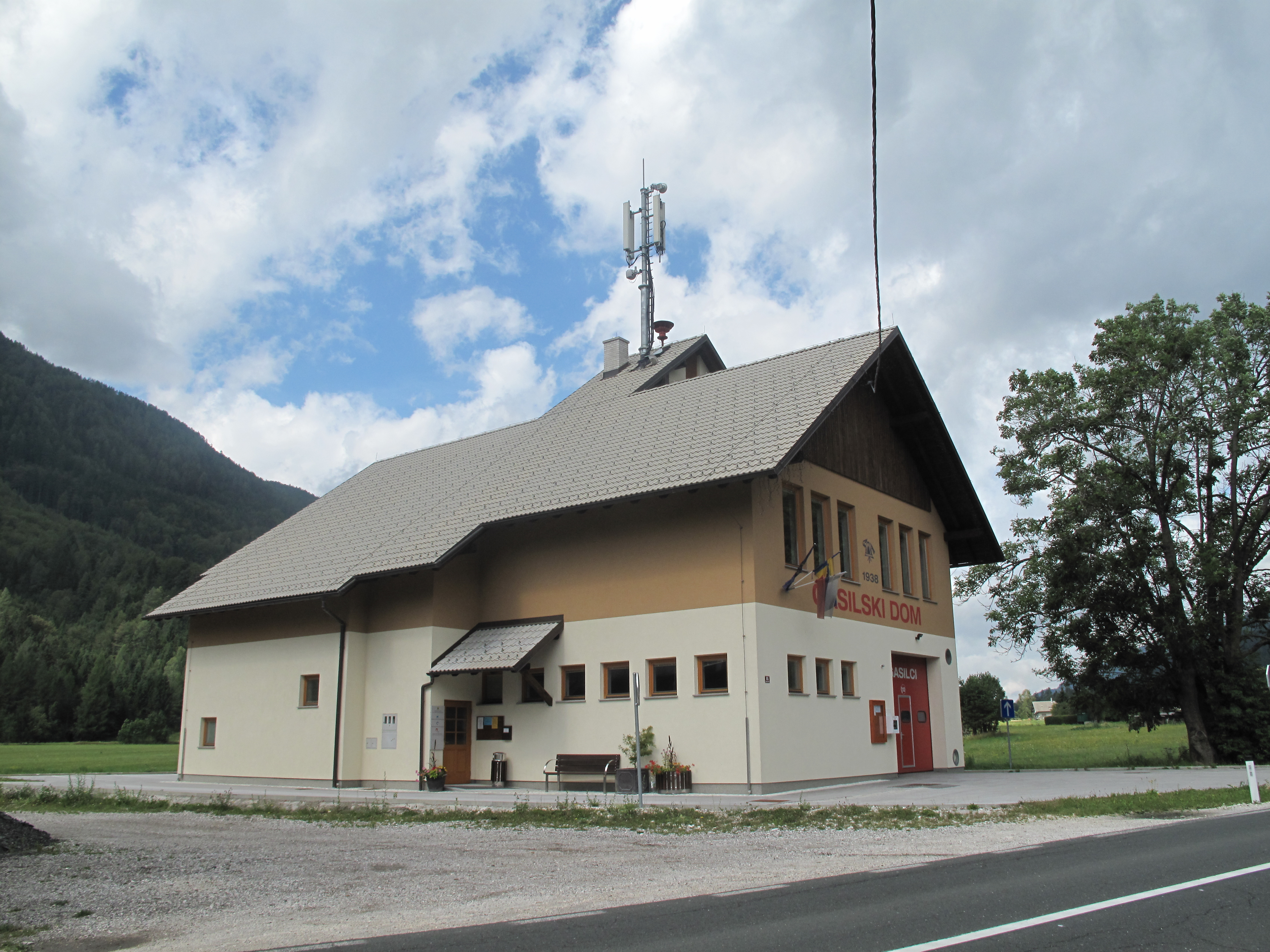
Gozd–Martuljek, fire station

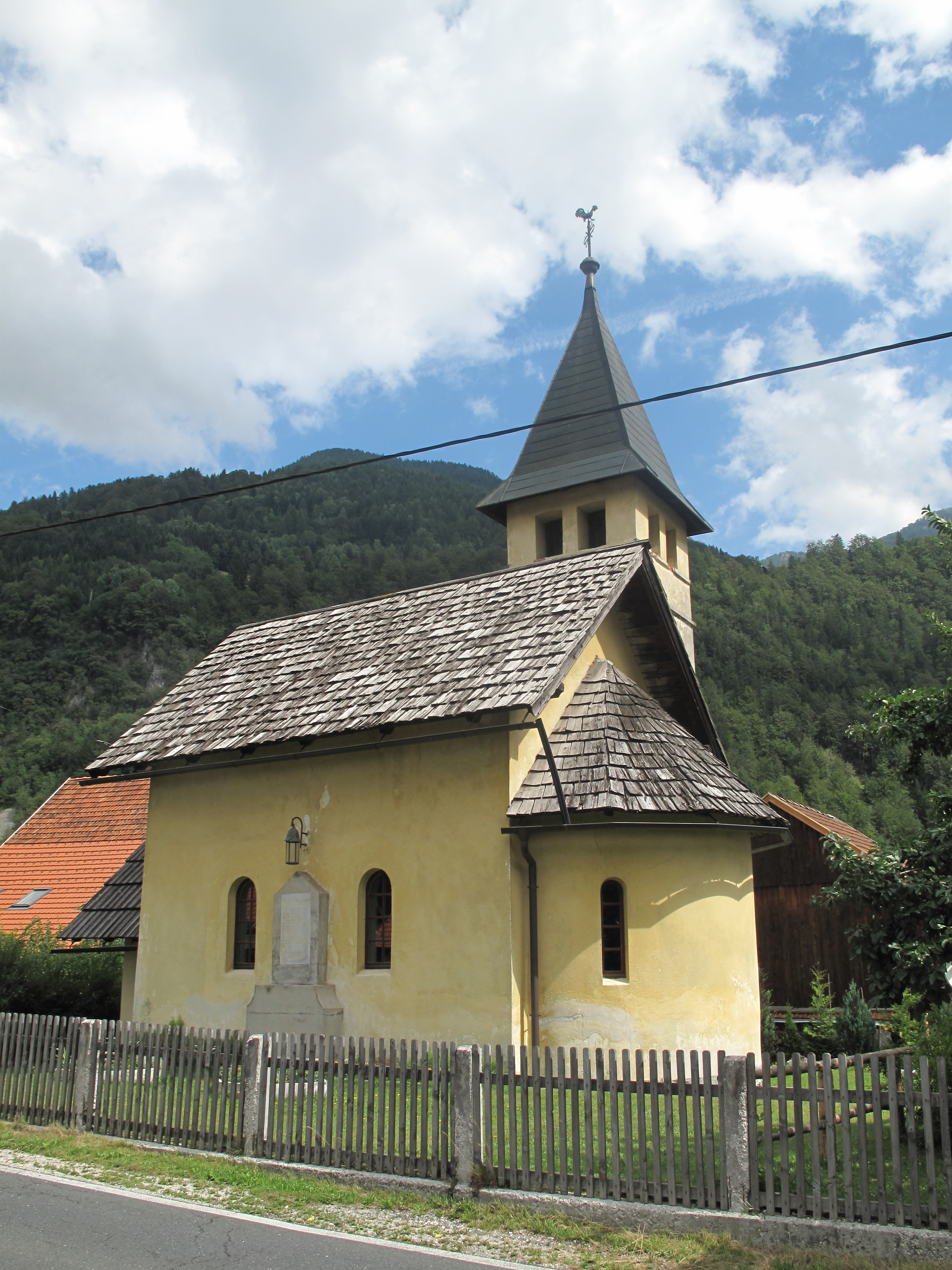
Gozd–Martuljek, chapel
