= Mangart =

Mountain on the Italy–Slovenia border

- Mangrt
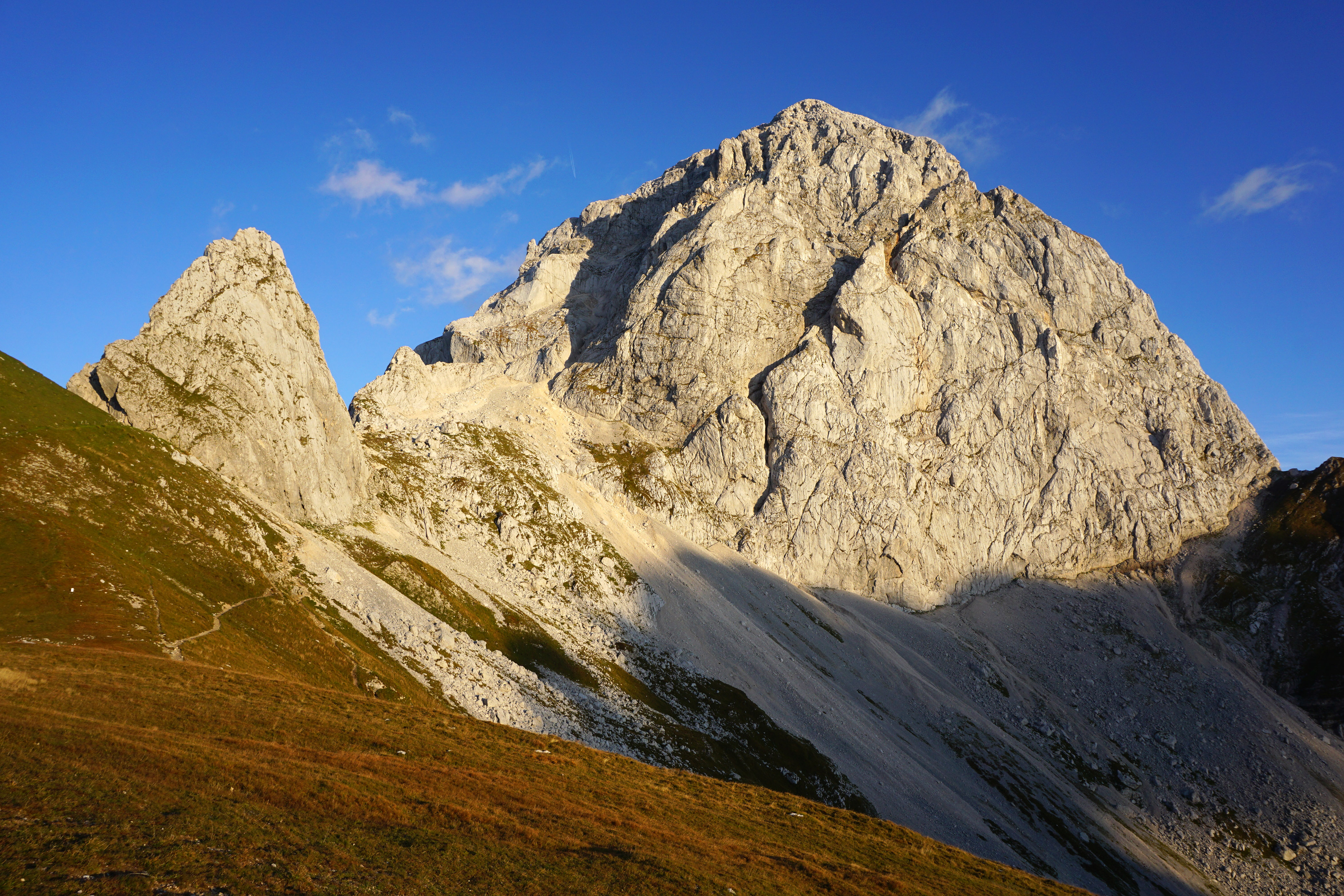

Highest point
- Elevation: 2,679 m (8,789 ft)
- Prominence: 1,065 m (3,494 ft)
- Listing: Alpine mountains 2500-2999 m
- Coordinates: 46°26′24″N 013°39′14″E

Geography
- Location within Alps
- Location: Slovenia - Italy
- Parent range: Julian Alps

Climbing
- First ascent: 1794

Mangart or Mangrt is a mountain in the Julian Alps, located on the border between Italy and Slovenia. With an elevation of 2,679 metres (8,789 ft), it is the fourth-highest peak in Slovenia, after Triglav, Škrlatica and Mali Triglav. It was first climbed in 1794 by the naturalist Franz von Hohenwart. Mangart is also the name of the mountain range between the Koritnica Valley and the Mangart Valley, with the highest peak called Veliki Mangart (Big Mount Mangart).

== Name ==
Mount Mangart was attested in historical sources in 1617 as Monhart. The name is of German origin, derived from the personal name Mainhart (from Old High German Maganhard). In addition to serving as the name of the mountain, this German name has also developed into Slovene surnames such as Manhart and Menart.

== Access ==
The road to Mangart Saddle (Slovene: Mangartsko sedlo; 2,072 metres or 6,798 feet) is the highest road in Slovenia. The Mangart Pass Lodge is located at the western foot of Mangart. There are two lakes under Mangart's northern face.

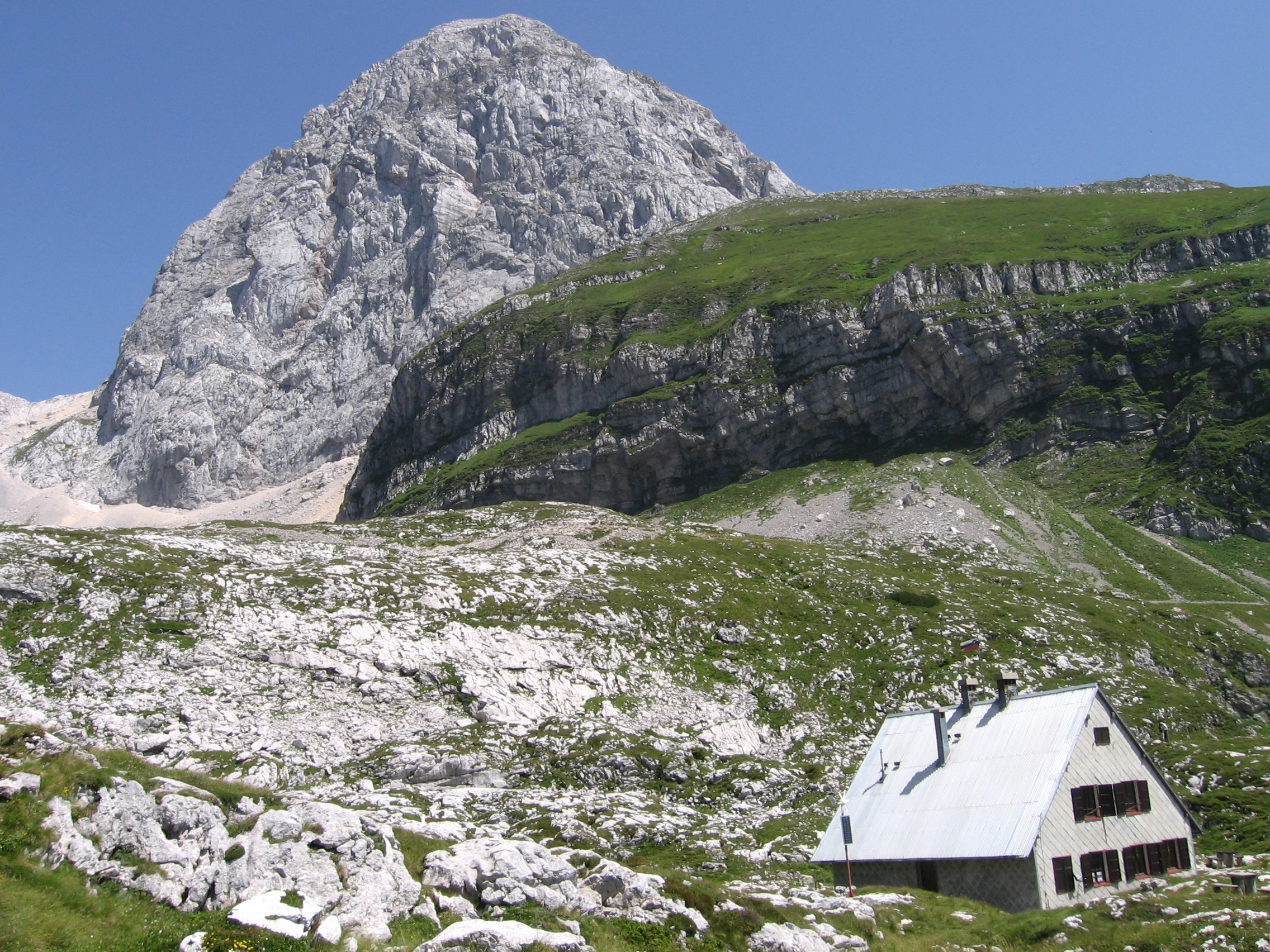
Mangart Saddle Lodge

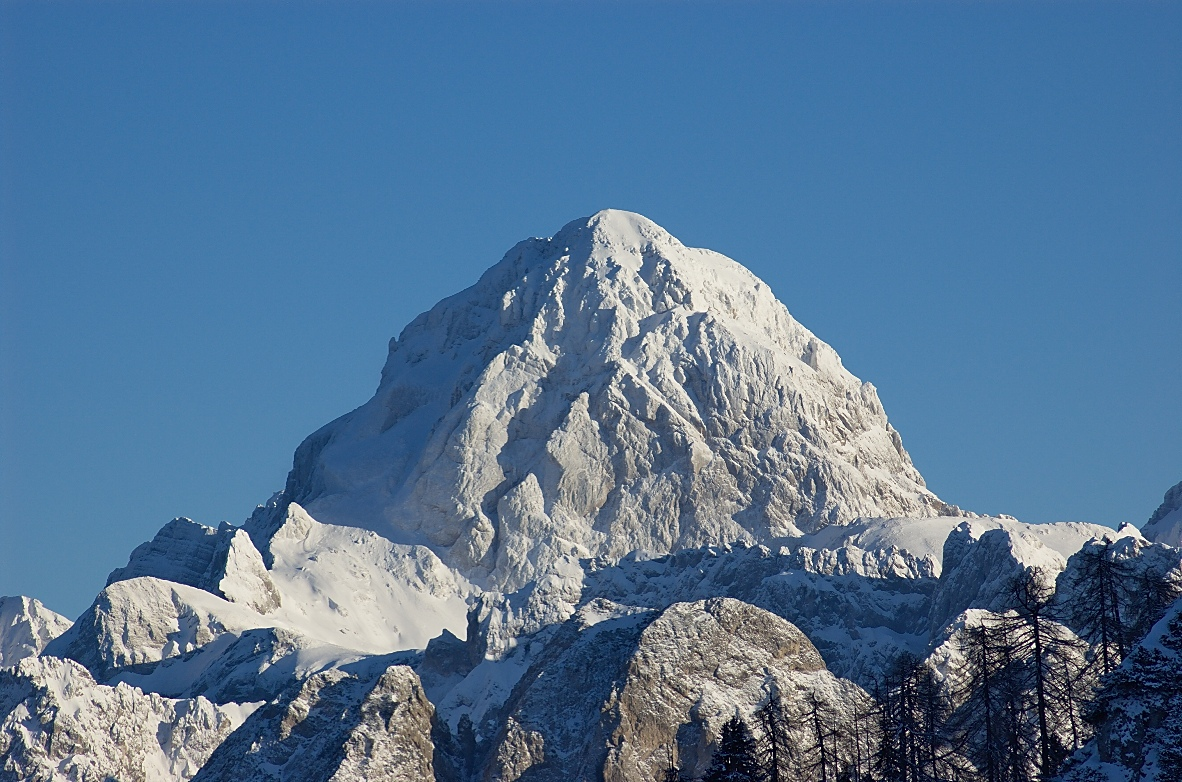
Mangart in winter

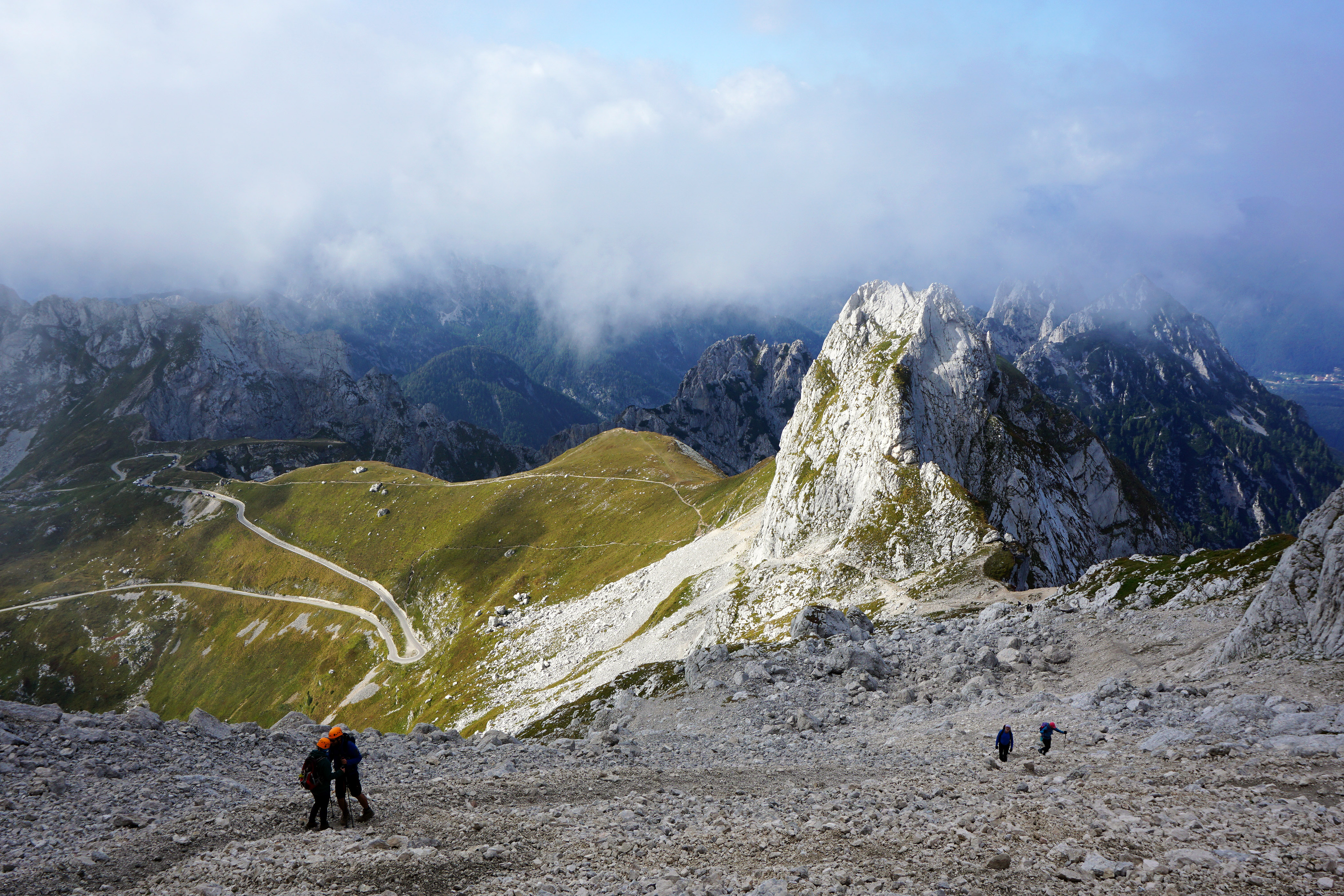
Mangart Pass seen from the Via Ferrata trail

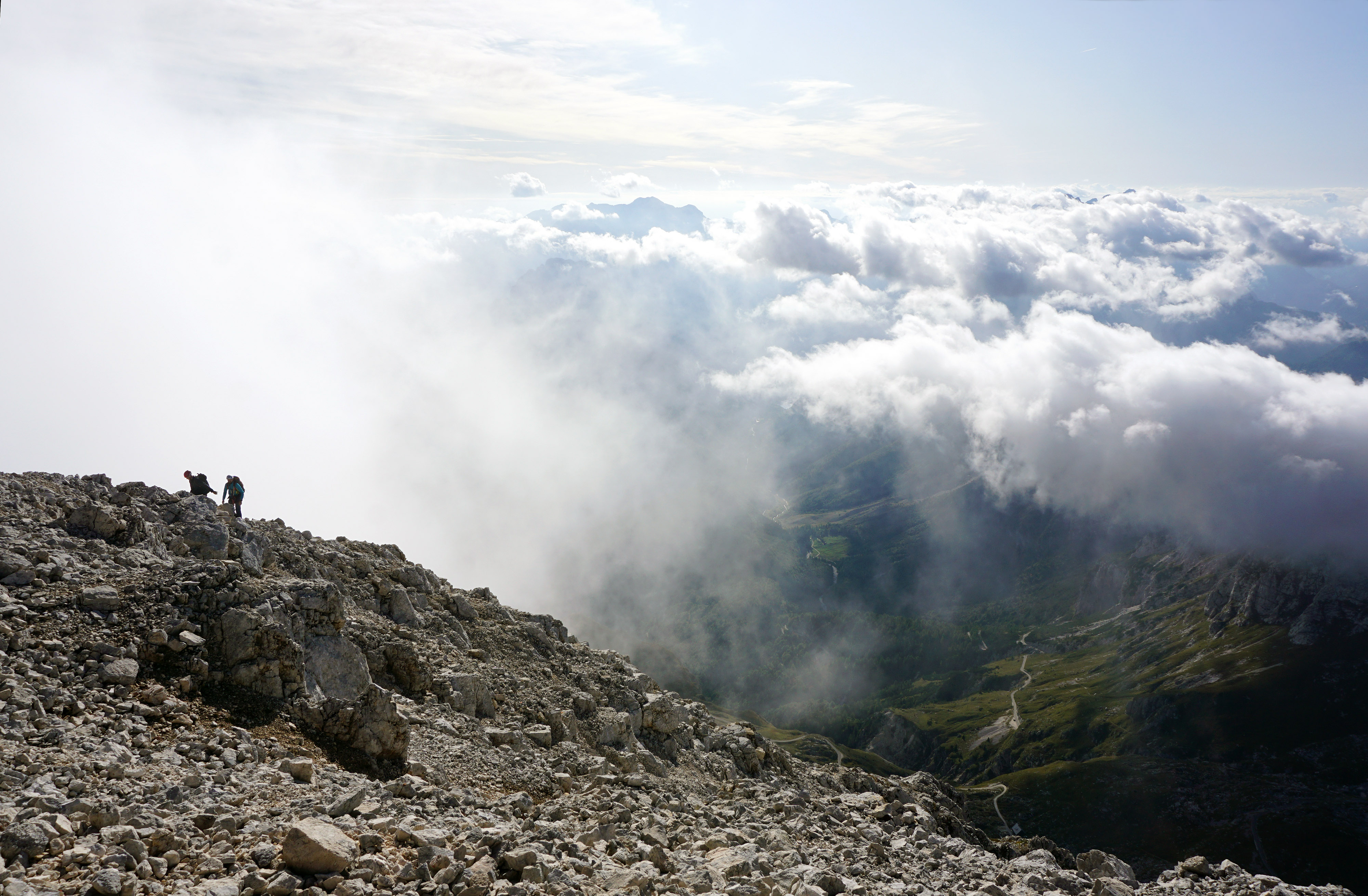
Hikers approaching the top of Mangart; view toward the southwest

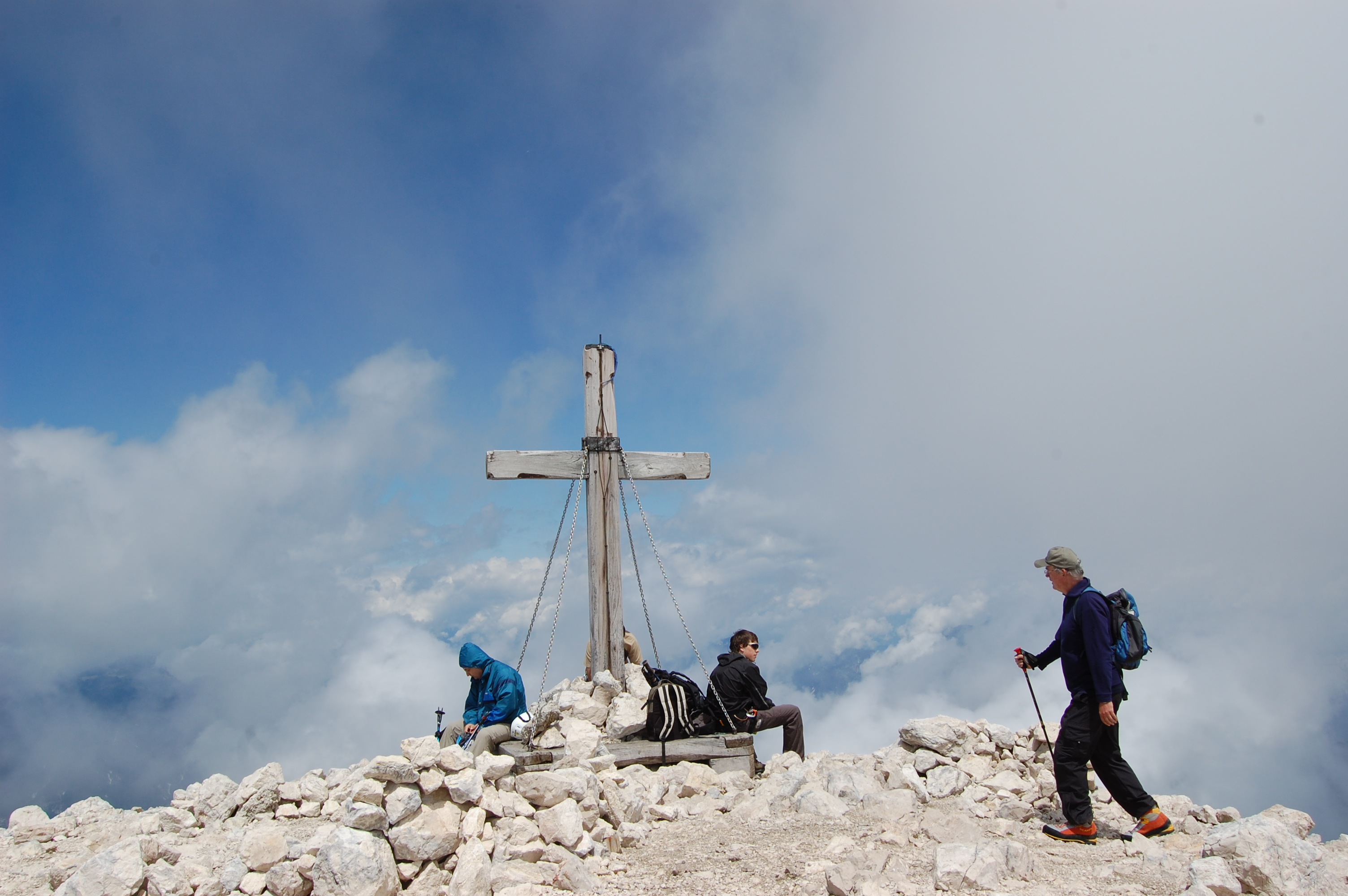
The peak of Mangart
