= Mount Rodica =

Mountain in Slovenia

Rodica
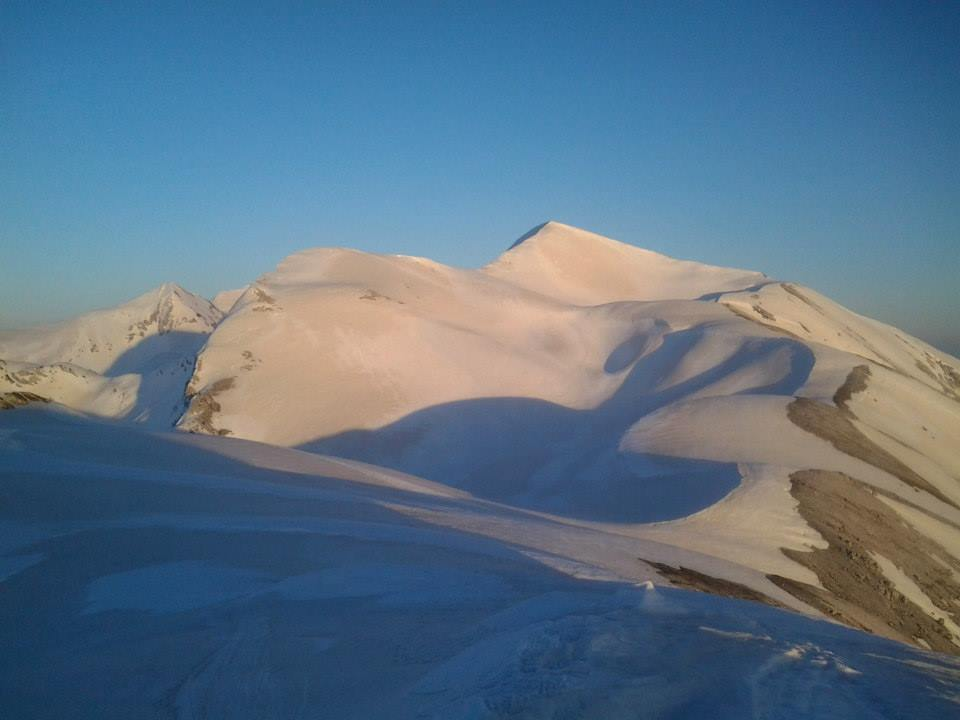

Highest point
- Elevation: 1,966 m (6,450 ft)
- Coordinates: 46°13′41″N 13°51′49″E

Geography
- Location: Slovenia
- Parent range: Julian Alps

Mount Rodica (1966 m) is a peak in the Julian Alps in Slovenia. It is accessible from Vogel Ski Resort above Ukanc in the Municipality of Bohinj.
