= Mojstrovica =

- Location within Slovenia

Highest point
- Elevation: 1,816 m (5,958 ft)
- Coordinates: 46°30′12″N 13°53′28″E

Geography
- Location: Slovenia
- Parent range: Karawanks

Mojstrovica (elevation 1,816 meters or 5,958 feet) is a peak in the western Karawanks in Slovenia. It is accessible from the village of Belca in the Municipality of Kranjska Gora.
