= Fusine in Valromana =

- Frazione
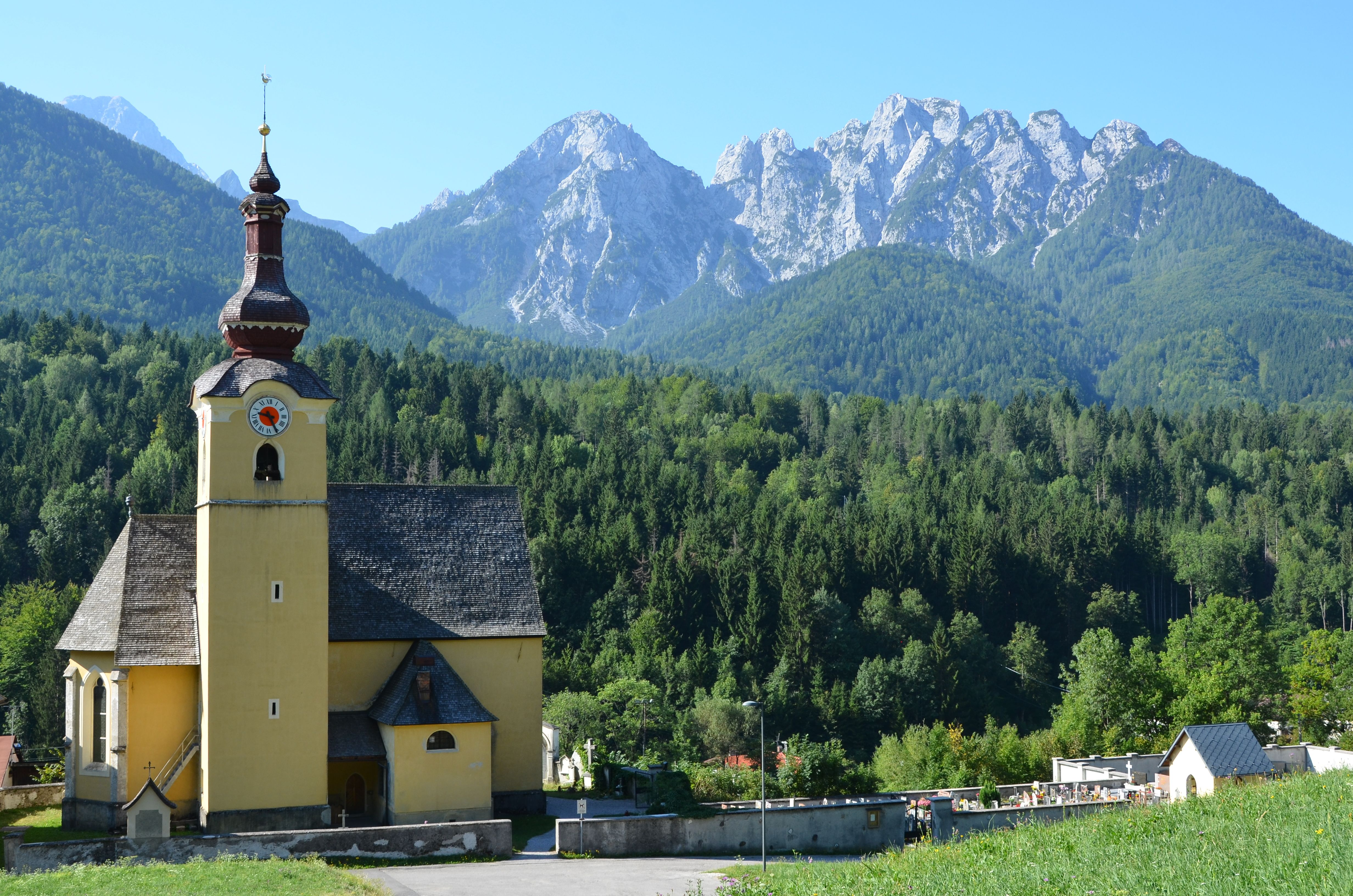
- St. Leonard's Catholic Church

- Location of Fusine in Valromana in Italy
- Coordinates: 46°29′43″N 13°38′48″E
- Country: Italy
- Region: Friuli-Venezia Giulia
- Province: Province of Udine (UD)
- Comune: Tarvisio
- Elevation: 773 m (2,536 ft)

Population
  - Total: 467
- Time zone: UTC+1 (CET)
  - Summer (DST): UTC+2 (CEST)
- Postal code: 33018
- Dialing code: 0428
- Patron saint: Saint Leonard
- Saint day: 6 November

Fusine in Valromana (Slovene: Fužine or Bela Peč; German: Weißenfels; Friulian: Fusinis) is a frazione (fractional parish) of the comune of Tarvisio in the Province of Udine, in the autonomous Friuli-Venezia Giulia region of northeastern Italy.

== Name ==
The locality takes its name from the Slovene (Fužine) and Friulian (Fusinis) term for the historic ironworks site. The Italian name is a slight modification from the Friulan, with "in Valromana" added, referring to an adjacent valley—which, however, is located a fair way off. The alternate Slovene denotation Bela Peč, like the German name Weißenfels, lit. 'white rock', refers to a historic castle erected by the Counts of Celje, owners of the area between 1418 and 1456, in the early 15th century.

== Geography ==
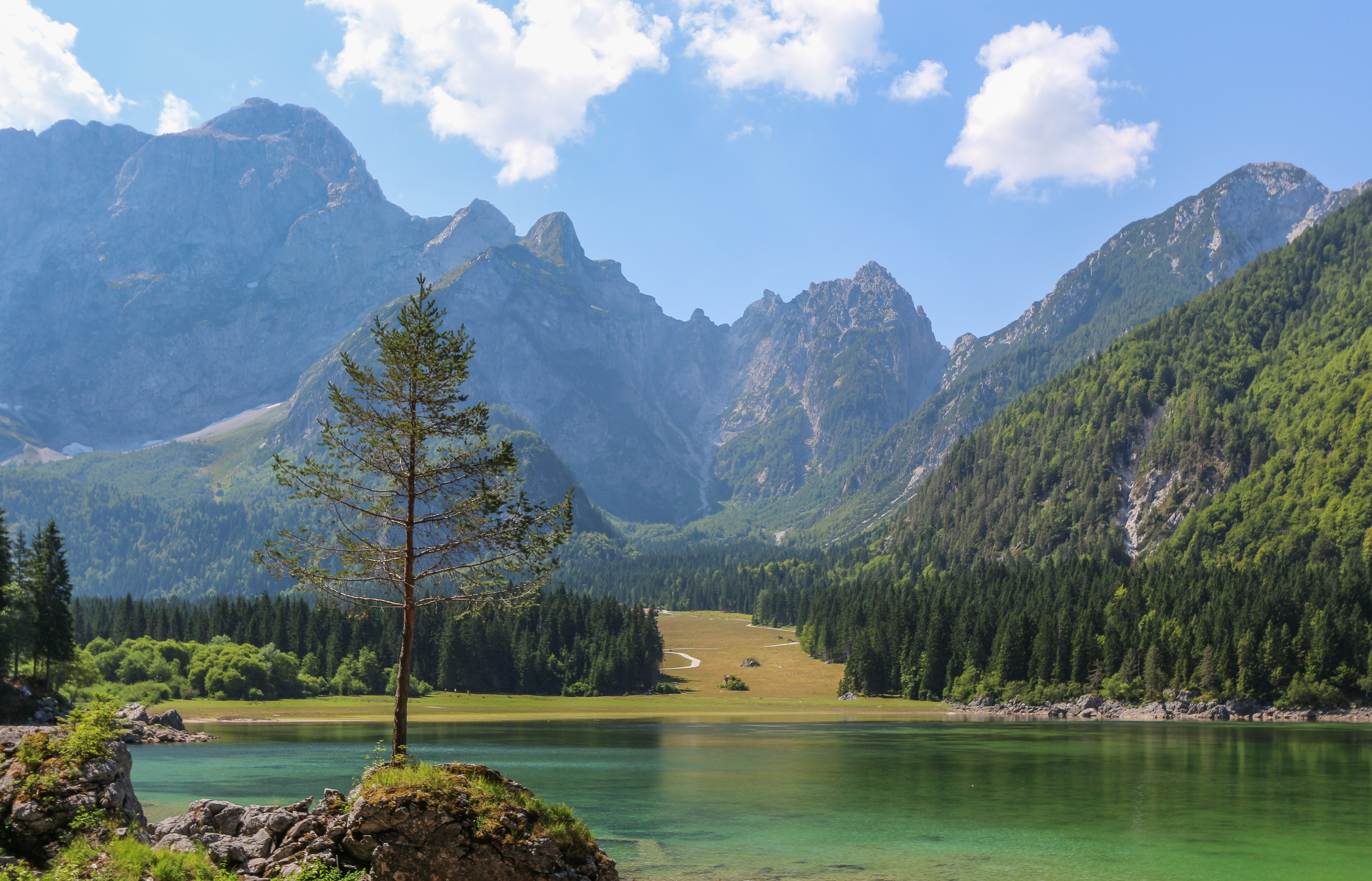
Upper Lake Fusine with Mt. Mangart

The hamlet is located in the western Julian Alps, about 8 km (5.0 mi) east of the Tarvisio town centre and close to the tripoint where the borders of Slovenia, Austria, and Italy meet. It is a stop on Highway SS 54, which leads from Tarvisio to the Slovenian border at the Fusine Saddle, continued by Slovenian Highway 202 leading via Rateče to Podkoren and further down to the town of Kranjska Gora in the upper Sava (Sava Dolinka) Valley.

The mountains and lakes in the vicinity of Fusine in Valromana are popular destinations for mountaineers and trekkers. Upper and Lower Lakes Fusine fed by artesian springs on the north face of the 2,677 m (8,783 ft) high Mangart peak attract many tourists.

The area immediately surrounding both lakes is protected by scenic Lake Fusine Nature Park (Italian: Parco naturale dei Laghi di Fusine), which covers 45 hectares. The meadows and pastures above the lake belong to the Fusine in Valromana pasture cooperative. This area includes the entire valley with about 180 hectares of alpine land and 200 hectares of forest.

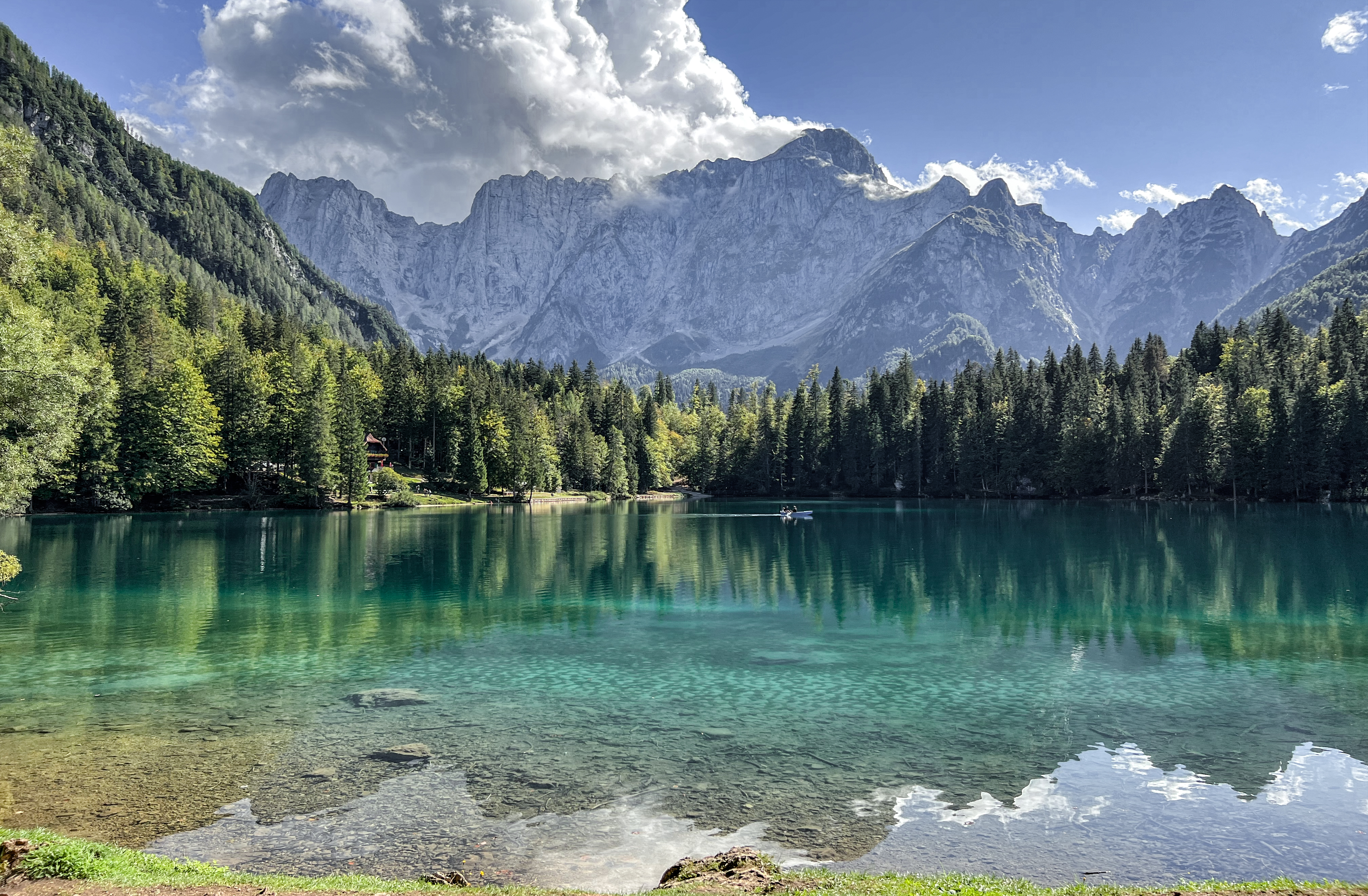
Lower Lake Fusine

== History ==
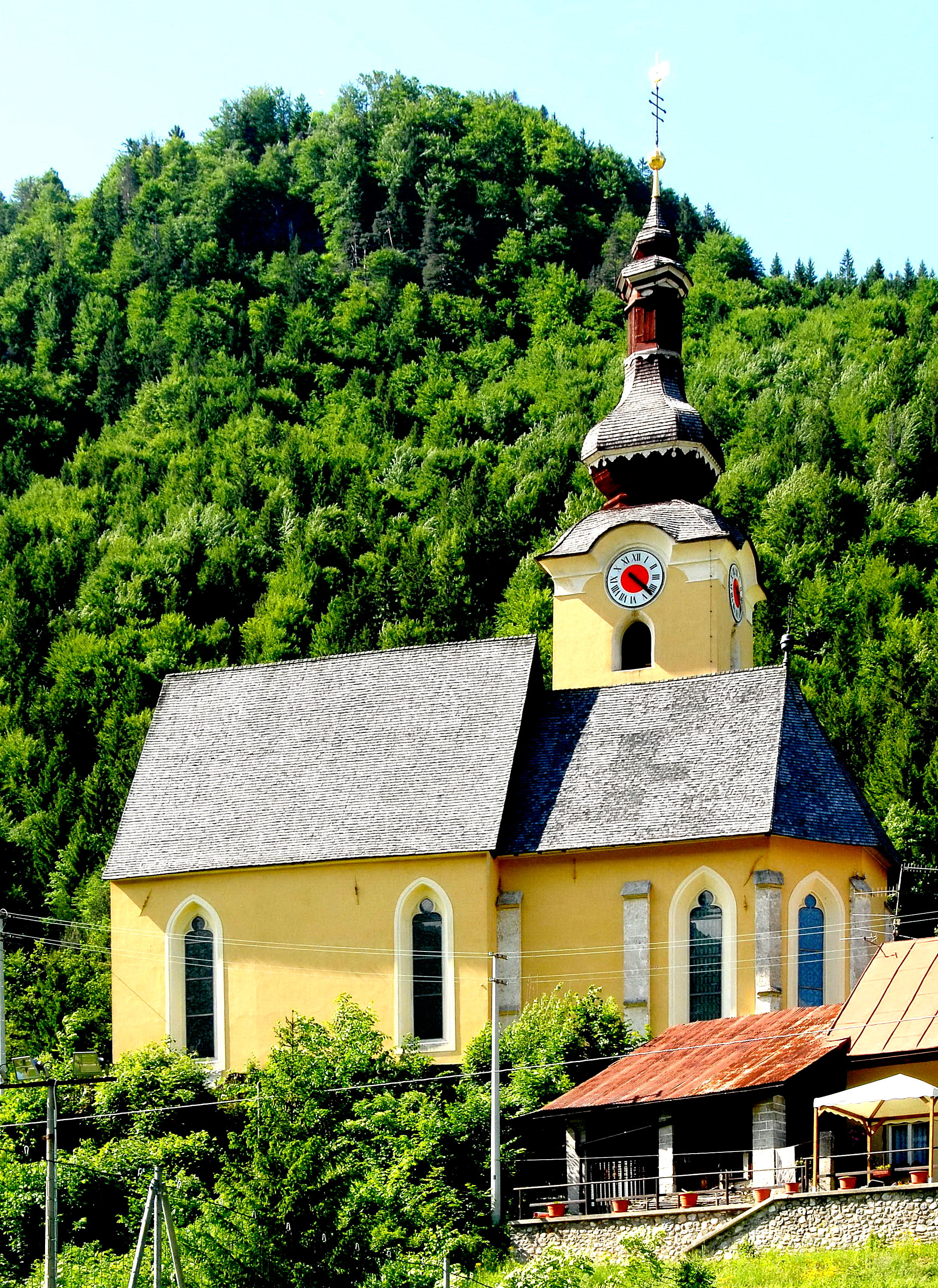
St. Leonard's Catholic Church

A first mining settlement was probably established about 1320, when the area was part of the March of Carniola under the rule of the House of Gorizia. Unlike the neighbouring villages to the west, this easternmost part of the Canale Valley was not included in the Carinthian possessions of the Prince-Bishops of Bamberg, granted to them by King Henry II of Germany in 1007, but belonged to the Counts of Ortenburg and was under the suzerainty of the Landgraves, later Dukes of Carniola. With the extinction of the Ortenburg Counts, the territory was inherited by the mighty House of Celje.

In 1404, the reigning Ortenburg count Frederick III gave one Consuran Bartholomew the right to build a forge, which established the iron industry and promoted the settlement of German-speaking workers. Several more forges were operating within the village by 1456 when cooperation agreements were made with the Austrian House of Habsburg, which had inherited the estates from the last count of Celje, Ulrich II.

The Lordship of Weißenfels remained the northwesternmost part of the Habsburg Duchy of Carniola, from 1804 under the control of the Austrian Empire and Austria-Hungary until the end of World War I. In October 1918, the predominantly German-speaking municipality of Weißenfels was awarded to Carinthia. In exchange, the Slovene-speaking municipality of Jezersko (German: Seeland) was awarded to the Kingdom of Serbs, Croats and Slovenes. According to the terms of the 1919 Treaty of Saint-Germain, however, Weißenfels was assigned to the Kingdom of Italy and was renamed Fusine.

In 1862 the German firm Göppinger & Co. patented a method of making steel chains without welds. The manufacturing of chain and other hardware items in Fusine in Valromana led the industrial company to become a "global player". A successful Italian foundry founded by Guido Segre after the First World War grew to have 300 employees by 1925. In 1976 the company reached a peak of 600 employees, and in 1995, the company employed about 300 people. In 1999, Pewag, Weissenfels, and KWB (Kettenwerk Brückl), three competing firms, combined under one roof, creating the company Pewag Weißenfels International GmbH.
