= Slavnik =

Mountain in Slovenia

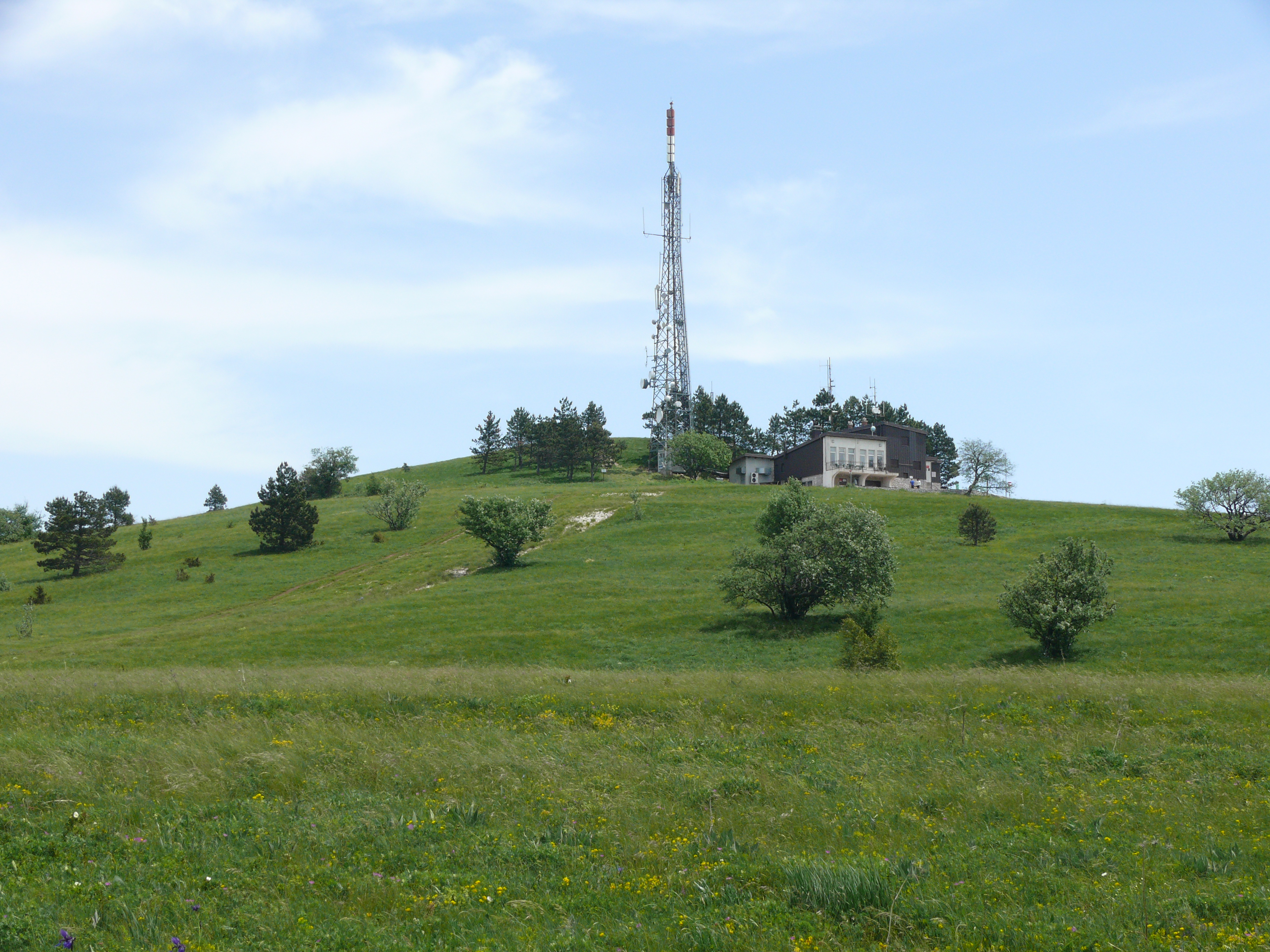
- The peak of Slavnik with Tuma Hut and a broadcast transmitter

Highest point
- Elevation: 1,028 m (3,373 ft)
- Coordinates: 45°32′02″N 13°58′33″E

Geography
- Location within Alps
- Location: Slovenia

At 1,028 metres (3,373 ft) high, Slavnik is one of the highest peaks of the Slovenian Istria. It is part of the Čičarija landscape. Tuma Hut on Slavnik, named after the mountaineer Henrik Tuma, stands about 10 metres (33 ft) below its peak. At its peak stands a broadcast transmitter.

It is distinguished by very broad panoramic view. In the direction of north-east one can see in the distance Kamnik-Savinja Alps and closer Nanos, Vremščica, Brkini. Visible to the east are Javorniki, Trojica and Snežnik, and in the distance also Gorski Kotar, Risnjak, Snježnik. From the east to the south there is Kvarner bay, before that Planik and Učka and Čičarija, as well as Istria. Towards the west, the coast of the Adriatic sea and places like Umag, Piran, Koper, Trieste, also Venice, are visible from the peak. From the west to the north one case see Dolomites, Julian Alps including the highest mountain in Slovenia Triglav, as well as the Karawanks.
