= List of mountain huts in the Alps =

This list of mountain huts in the Alps includes huts, shelters and similar simple accommodations. In addition to a large number of Alpine club huts of the Alpine clubs, there are also many in private ownership. The list includes some, but by far not all huts in the seven Alpine countries of Germany, France, Italy, Liechtenstein, Austria, Switzerland and Slovenia. These accommodations are also called Rifugio, in Italy, and Refuge in France and French-speaking Switzerland. In Slovenia they are called Dom or Koča.

== List of mountain huts in the alps ==
Hut	Owner	Mountain range
=== A ===		
A Neuve Hut	Swiss Alpine Club	Mont Blanc massif
Ackerl Hut	Austrian Alpine Club	Kaiser Mountains
Albert Premier Hut	Club alpin français	Mont Blanc massif
Aljažev dom v Vratih	Planinsko društvo Dovje - Mojstrana	Julian Alps
Almageller Hut	Swiss Alpine Club	Pennine Alps
Anton Karg Haus	Austrian Alpine Club	Kaiser Mountains
Argentière Hut	Club alpin français	Mont Blanc massif
=== B ===		
Bergli Hut	Swiss Alpine Club	Bernese Alps
Bertol Hut	Swiss Alpine Club	Pennine Alps
Bochumer Hut	German Alpine Club	Kitzbühel Alps
Boval Hut	Swiss Alpine Club	Bernina Range
Britannia Hut	Swiss Alpine Club	Pennine Alps
Bürgl Hut		Kitzbühel Alps
=== C ===		
Chalet Reynard		Vaucluse Mountains
Chanrion Hut	Swiss Alpine Club	Pennine Alps
Coburger Hütte	German Alpine Club	Mieming Range
Cosmiques Hut	Compagnie des Guides de Chamonix commune de Chamonix-Mont-Blanc	Mont Blanc massif
Couvercle Hut	Club alpin français	Mont Blanc massif
Cristallina Hut	CAS Ticino	Ticino Alps
Czech Lodge at Spodnje Ravni		Kamnik–Savinja Alps
=== D ===		
Dent Blanche Hut	Swiss Alpine Club	Pennine Alps
Dix Hut	SAC Monte Rosa	Pennine Alps
Dom Hut	SAC Uto	Pennine Alps
Dreizinnen Hut	Club Alpino Italiano	Sexten Dolomites
Durier Hut	Club alpin français	Mont Blanc massif
=== E ===		
Elberfelder Hut	German Alpine Club	Schober group
Europa Hut	Randa	Pennine Alps
=== F ===		
Finsteraarhorn Hut	Swiss Alpine Club	Bernese Alps
Franz Senn Hut	Austrian Alpine Club	Stubai Alps
Frischauf Lodge at Okrešelj		Kamnik–Savinja Alps
Fritz Pflaum Hut	German Alpine Club	Kaiser Mountains
=== G ===		
Gandegg Hut		Pennine Alps
Gaudeamus Hut	German Alpine Club	Kaiser Mountains
Georgy Hut		Livigno Alps
Gleckstein Hut	Swiss Alpine Club	Bernese Alps
Gnifetti Hut	Club Alpino Italiano	Pennine Alps
Gonella Hut	Club Alpino Italiano	Mont Blanc massif
Goûter Refuge	Club alpin français Ville de Saint-Gervais-les-Bains	Mont Blanc massif
Grand Mountet Hut	Swiss Alpine Club	Pennine Alps
Grands Mulets Hut	Club alpin français	Mont Blanc massif
Great St Bernard Hospice		Great St Bernard Pass
Grmovšek Lodge Below Big Kopa Peak		Pohorje
Grutten Hut	German Alpine Club	Kaiser Mountains
=== H ===		
Hans Berger Haus	Friends of Nature	Kaiser Mountains
Heidelberger Hut	German Alpine Club	Silvretta Alps
Hohsaas Hut	Private	Pennine Alps
Hollandia Hut	SAC Bern	Bernese Alps
Höllentalanger Hut	German Alpine Club	Wetterstein
Hörnli Hut	SAC Monte Rosa	Pennine Alps
=== I ===		
Innsbrucker Hut	Austrian Alpine Club	Stubai Alps
=== J ===		
=== K ===		
Kaindl Hut		Kaiser Mountains
Kamnik Saddle Lodge	Planinsko društvo Kamnik	Kamnik–Savinja Alps
Knorr Hut	German Alpine Club	Wetterstein
Kocbek Lodge at Korošica		Kamnik–Savinja Alps
Konkordia Hut	Swiss Alpine Club	Bernese Alps
=== L ===		
La Charpoua alpine hut	Compagnie des Guides de Chamonix commune de Chamonix-Mont-Blanc	Mont Blanc massif
Laufen Hut	German Alpine Club	Tennen Mountains
Lauteraar Hut	Swiss Alpine Club	Bernese Alps
Lizumer Hütte	Austrian Alpine Club	Tux Alps
Loka Lodge at Raduha		Kamnik–Savinja Alps
=== M ===		
Margherita Hut	Club Alpino Italiano	Pennine Alps
Maribor Lodge		Pohorje
Mischabel Hut	Academic Alpine Club Zurich	Pennine Alps
Mittellegi Hut	Swiss Alpine Club	Bernese Alps
Monte Rosa Hut	SAC Monte Rosa	Pennine Alps
Mönchsjoch Hut	Swiss Alpine Club	Bernese Alps
Münchner Haus	German Alpine Club	Wetterstein
=== N ===		
New Bamberg Hut	German Alpine Club	Kitzbühel Alps
Nördlinger Hut	German Alpine Club	Erlspitze Group
=== O ===		
=== P ===		
Pinzgau Hut	Friends of Nature	Kitzbühel Alps
Planika Lodge at Triglav		Triglav Group
Prešeren Lodge at Stol		Western Karawanks
=== Q ===		
Quintino Sella Hut	Club Alpino Italiano	Mont Blanc massif
=== R ===		
Rappensee Hut	German Alpine Club	Allgäu Alps
Ravensburger Hut	German Alpine Club	Lechquellen Mountains
Refuge Alfred Wills	commune de Sixt-Fer-à-Cheval	Massif du Faucigny
Refuge Aoste	Club Alpino Italiano	Pennine Alps
Refuge Arbolle		Gran Paradiso Massif
Refuge Barmasse		Pennine Alps
Refuge Crête Sèche	Club Alpino Italiano	Pennine Alps
Refuge Diavolezza		Bernina Range
Refuge Dondénaz		Gran Paradiso Massif
Refuge Duc des Abruzzes à l'Oriondé		Pennine Alps
Refuge Elena		Pennine Alps
Refuge Elisabetta Soldini Montanaro	Club Alpino Italiano	Mont Blanc massif
Refuge Frédéric Chabod	Club Alpino Italiano	Gran Paradiso Massif
Refuge Grand Tournalin		Pennine Alps
Refuge Guides du Cervin	Matterhorn Mountain Guide Club	Pennine Alps
Refuge Guy Rey	Club Alpino Italiano	Cottian Alps
Refuge Jean-Antoine Carrel	Matterhorn Mountain Guide Club	Pennine Alps
Refuge Jean-Frédéric Benevolo	Club Alpino Italiano	Graian Alps
Refuge Marinelli Bombardieri	Club Alpino Italiano	Bernina Range
Refuge Monte Bianco	Club Alpino Italiano	Graian Alps
Refuge Nacamuli au col Collon	Club Alpino Italiano	Pennine Alps
Refuge Ottorino Mezzalama	Club Alpino Italiano	Pennine Alps
Refuge Prarayer	Club Alpino Italiano	Pennine Alps
Refuge Quintino Sella au Félik	Club Alpino Italiano	Pennine Alps
Refuge Robert Blanc	Ville de Bourg-Saint-Maurice	Mont Blanc massif
Refuge Sogno de Berdzé au Péradza		Gran Paradiso Massif
Refuge Victor Sella	Club Alpino Italiano	Gran Paradiso Massif
Refuge Victor-Emmanuel II	Club Alpino Italiano	Gran Paradiso Massif
Refuge Walter-Bonatti		Pennine Alps
Refuge d'Ambin	Club alpin français	Mont Cenis
Refuge d'Avérole	Club alpin français	Graian Alps
Refuge de La Martin	Vanoise National Park	Vanoise Massif
Refuge de La Valette	Vanoise National Park	Vanoise Massif
Refuge de Leschaux	Club alpin français	Mont Blanc massif
Refuge de Plan Sec		Vanoise Massif
Refuge de Platé	Club alpin français	Massif du Faucigny
Refuge de Presset	Club alpin français commune de La Plagne Tarentaise	Beaufortain Mountains
Refuge de Rosuel		Vanoise Massif
Refuge de Tré la Tête		Mont Blanc massif
Refuge de Turia	Vanoise National Park	Vanoise Massif
Refuge de Vallonbrun		Vanoise Massif
Refuge de Véran	Club alpin français	Massif du Faucigny
Refuge de l'Aigle	Club alpin français commune de La Grave	Massif des Écrins
Refuge de l'Archeboc		Graian Alps
Refuge de l'Arpont	Vanoise National Park	Vanoise Massif
Refuge de la Dent Parrachée	Club alpin français	Vanoise Massif
Refuge de la Dent d'Oche	Club alpin français	Chablais Massif
Refuge de la Femma	Vanoise National Park	Vanoise Massif
Refuge de la Fournache		Vanoise Massif
Refuge de la Pilatte	Club alpin français	Massif des Écrins
Refuge de la Pointe Percée	Club alpin français commune du Grand-Bornand	Aravis Range
Refuge de la Traie		Vanoise Massif
Refuge de la Valmasque	Club alpin français	Mercantour Mountains
Refuge des Anges au Morion	Operation Mato Grosso	Graian Alps
Refuge des Bans	Club alpin français	Massif des Écrins
Refuge des lacs Merlet	Ville de Saint-Bon-Tarentaise commune de Courchevel	Vanoise Massif
Refuge des Écrins	Club alpin français	Massif des Écrins
Refuge des Évettes	Club alpin français	Graian Alps
Refuge du Carro	Club alpin français	Graian Alps
Refuge du Col de la Vanoise	Club alpin français	Vanoise Massif
Refuge du Col du Palet	Vanoise National Park	Vanoise Massif
Refuge du Cuchet	Vanoise National Park	Vanoise Massif
Refuge du Folly	Ville de Samoëns	Giffre Mountains
Refuge du Fond des Fours	Vanoise National Park	Vanoise Massif
Refuge du Grand Bec	Club alpin français	Vanoise Massif
Refuge du Mont Jovet	Ville de Bozel	Vanoise Massif
Refuge du Mont Thabor	Club alpin français commune de Modane	Cottian Alps
Refuge du Parmelan	Club alpin français	Bornes Massif
Refuge du Pelvoux	Club alpin français	Massif des Écrins
Refuge du Plan de l'Aiguille		Mont Blanc massif
Refuge du Plan du Lac		Vanoise Massif
Refuge du Prariond	Vanoise National Park	Vanoise Massif
Refuge du Promontoire	Club alpin français	Massif des Écrins
Refuge du Roc de la Pêche		Vanoise Massif
Refuge du Ruitor		Graian Alps
Refuge du Saut		Vanoise Massif
Refuge du Sélé	Club alpin français commune de Vallouise-Pelvoux	Massif des Écrins
Refuge du Théodule	Club Alpino Italiano	Pennine Alps
Refuge du col de la Croix du Bonhomme	Club alpin français	Mont Blanc massif
Refuge du lac du Lou	commune des Belleville	Vanoise Massif
Reintalanger Hut	German Alpine Club	Wetterstein
Ribnica Lodge		Pohorje
Rifugio Campo Base	Acceglio	Chambeyron Mountains
Rifugio Carate Brianza	Club Alpino Italiano	Western Rhaetian Alps; Bernina Range
Rifugio Guglielmina		Monte Rosa Massif
Rifugio Marco e Rosa	Club Alpino Italiano	Bernina Range
Rifugio Sanremo	Club Alpino Italiano	Ligurian Alps
Rothornhütte	Swiss Alpine Club	Pennine Alps
Rottal Hut	Swiss Alpine Club	Bernese Alps
Ruška koča		Pohorje
=== S ===		
Saleina Hut	Swiss Alpine Club	Mont Blanc massif
Schreckhorn Hut	Swiss Alpine Club	Bernese Alps
Schönbiel Hut	SAC Monte Rosa	Pennine Alps
Simony Hut	Austrian Alpine Club	Dachstein Mountains
Smrekovec Lodge		Kamnik–Savinja Alps
Solsteinhaus	Austrian Alpine Club	Karwendel
Solvay Hut	Swiss Alpine Club	Pennine Alps
Soreiller hut	Dauphiné Tourism Club	Massif des Écrins
Stripsenjochhaus	Austrian Alpine Club	Kaiser Mountains
=== T ===		
Torino Hut	Club Alpino Italiano	Mont Blanc massif
Tracuit Hut	Swiss Alpine Club	Pennine Alps
Trient Hut	Swiss Alpine Club	Mont Blanc massif
Triglav Lakes Lodge		Triglav Group
Triglav Lodge at Kredarica		Triglav Group
Tschierva Hut	Swiss Alpine Club	Bernina Range
Tête Rousse Hut	Club alpin français Ville de Saint-Gervais-les-Bains	Mont Blanc massif
=== U ===		
=== V ===		
Vallot Hut	Club alpin français	Mont Blanc massif
Vignettes Hut	SAC Monte Rosa	Pennine Alps
Vorderkaiserfelden Hut	German Alpine Club	Kaiser Mountains
=== W ===		
Wangenitzseehütte	Austrian Alpine Club	Schober group
Weinbergerhaus		Kaiser Mountains
Weisshorn Hut	Swiss Alpine Club	Weisshorn Mountains
Wiener-Neustädter Hut	Austrian Tourist Club	Wetterstein
Wildhornhütte	Swiss Alpine Club	Bernese Alps
Wildseeloderhaus	Austrian Alpine Club	Kitzbühel Alps
Weissmies Hut	Swiss Alpine Club	Pennine Alps
=== X ===		
=== Y ===		
=== Z ===		
Zois Lodge at Kokra Saddle		Kamnik–Savinja Alps
chalet alpin du Tour	Club alpin français	Mont Blanc massif
