= Refuge du Mont Jovet =

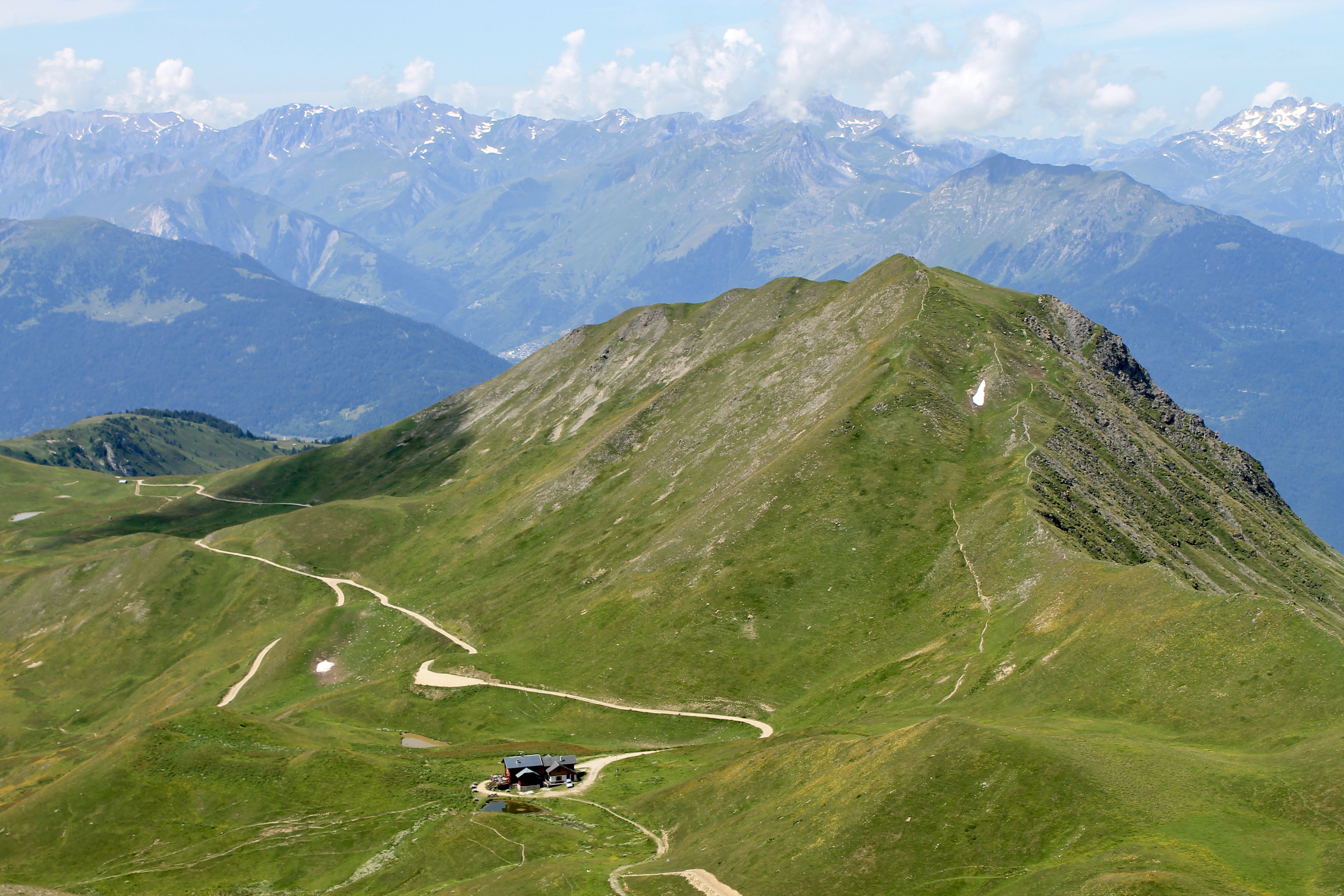
- Refuge du Mount Jovet from the top of Mount Jovet
- Interactive map of the Refuge du Mont Jovet area

General information
- Type: Alpine hut
- Location: Savoie, France
- Coordinates: 45.49111°N 6.63111°E
- Opened: 1890

Website
- http://en.ot-bozel.com/mont-jovet-mountain-hut-1.html

Refuge du Mont Jovet is a mountain hut ('refuge') in the Savoie region of the French Alps, opened in 1890 and now maintained by the Bozel municipality. It is located a three-hour walk from La Cour, or a 45-minute drive from Bozel.

It is open from June through September each year and has bedrooms for 2-4 people each plus a dormitory for 10, showers and a restaurant. During the winter, when the main refuge is closed, a simpler refuge built in 2016 is available, 80m down the slope.

== See also ==
List of mountain huts in the Alps
