= Refuge des lacs Merlet =

Refuge

Coordinates: 45°21′14″N 6°39′25″E

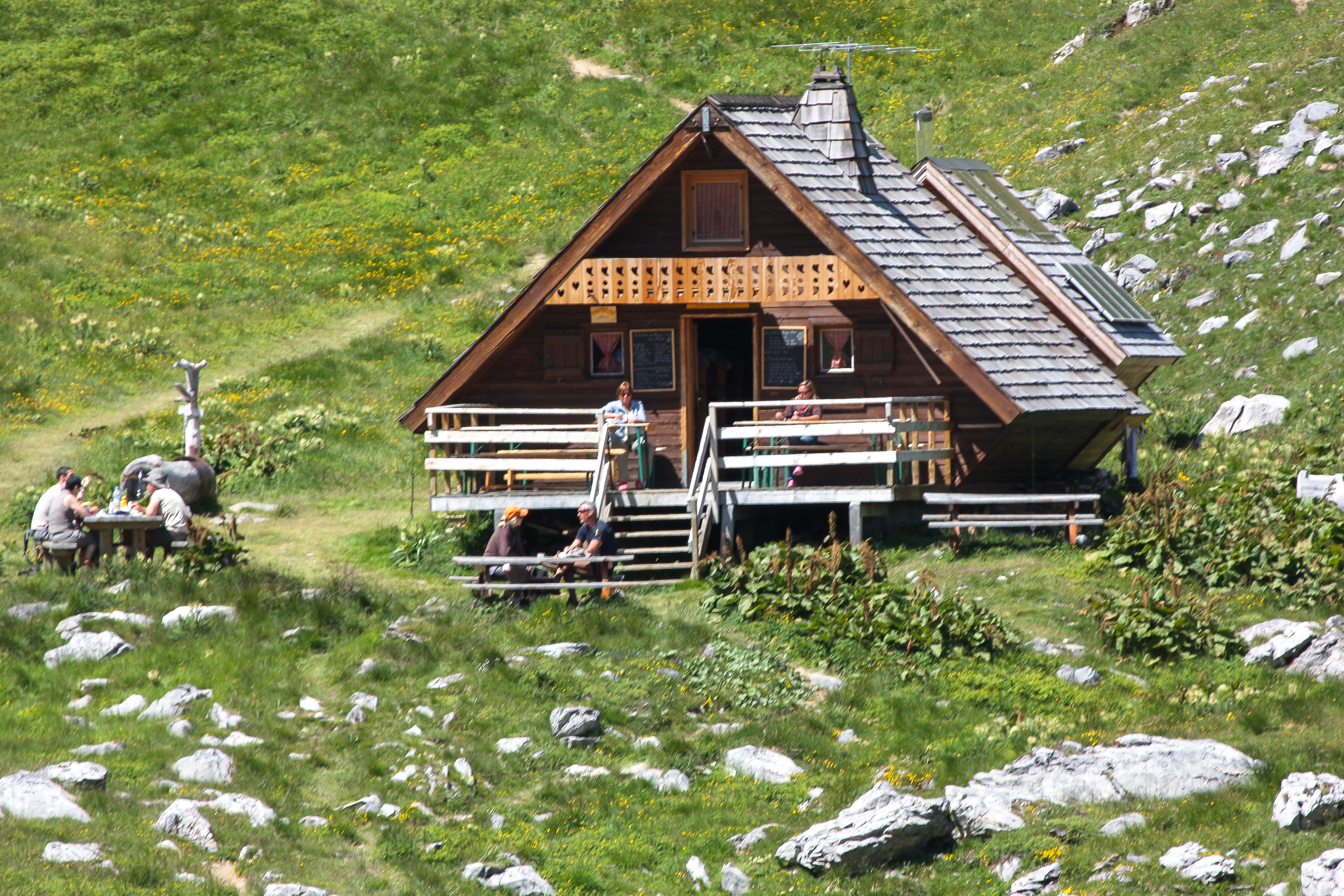
Refuge des lacs Merlet

Refuge des lacs Merlet is a refuge in the Alps.
