= Refuge de Rosuel =

Coordinates: 45°31′06″N 6°48′13″E

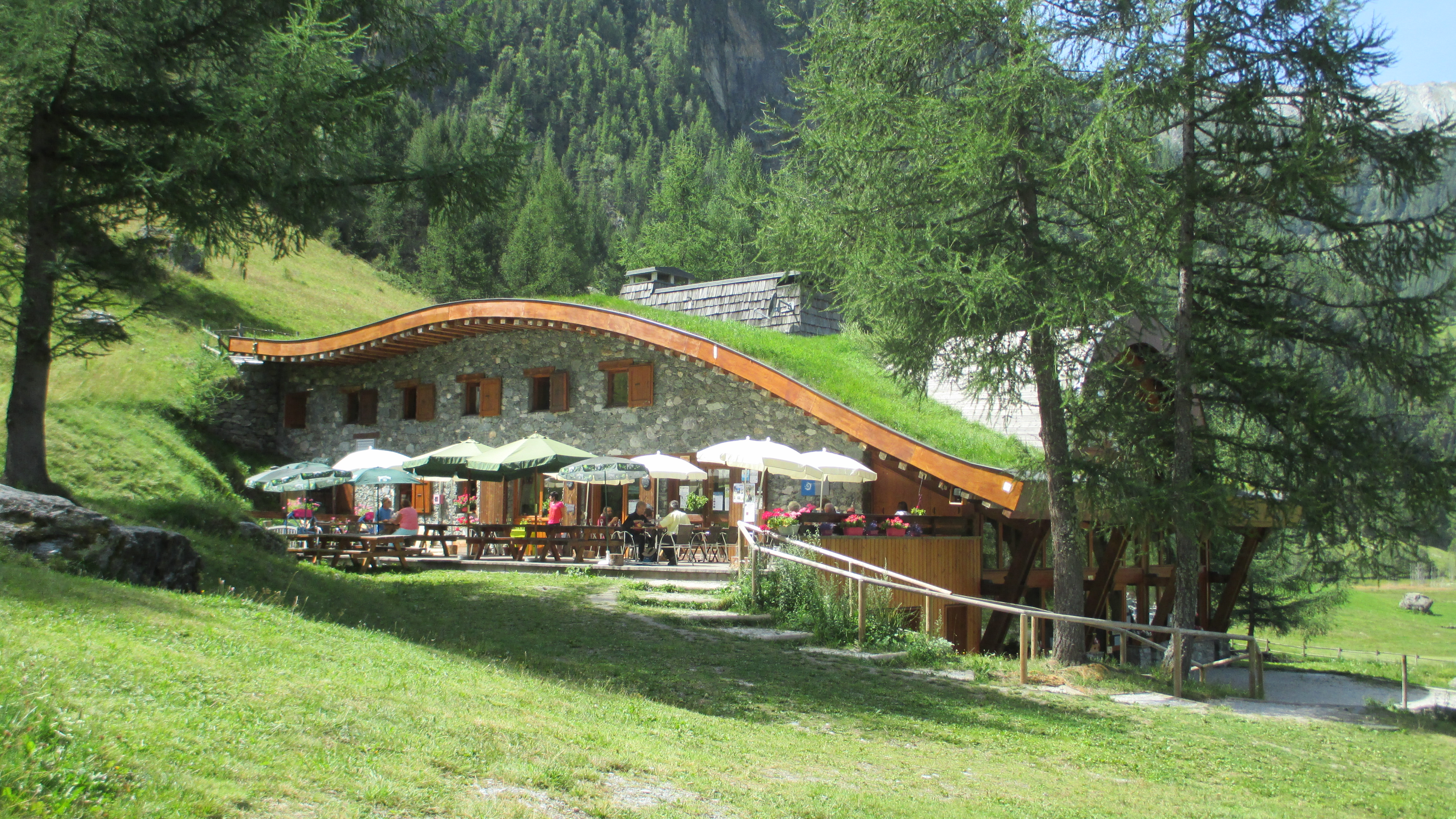
Refuge de Rosuel

Refuge de Rosuel is a refuge of Savoie, France. It lies in the Massif de la Vanoise range. It has an altitude of 1556 metres above sea level.

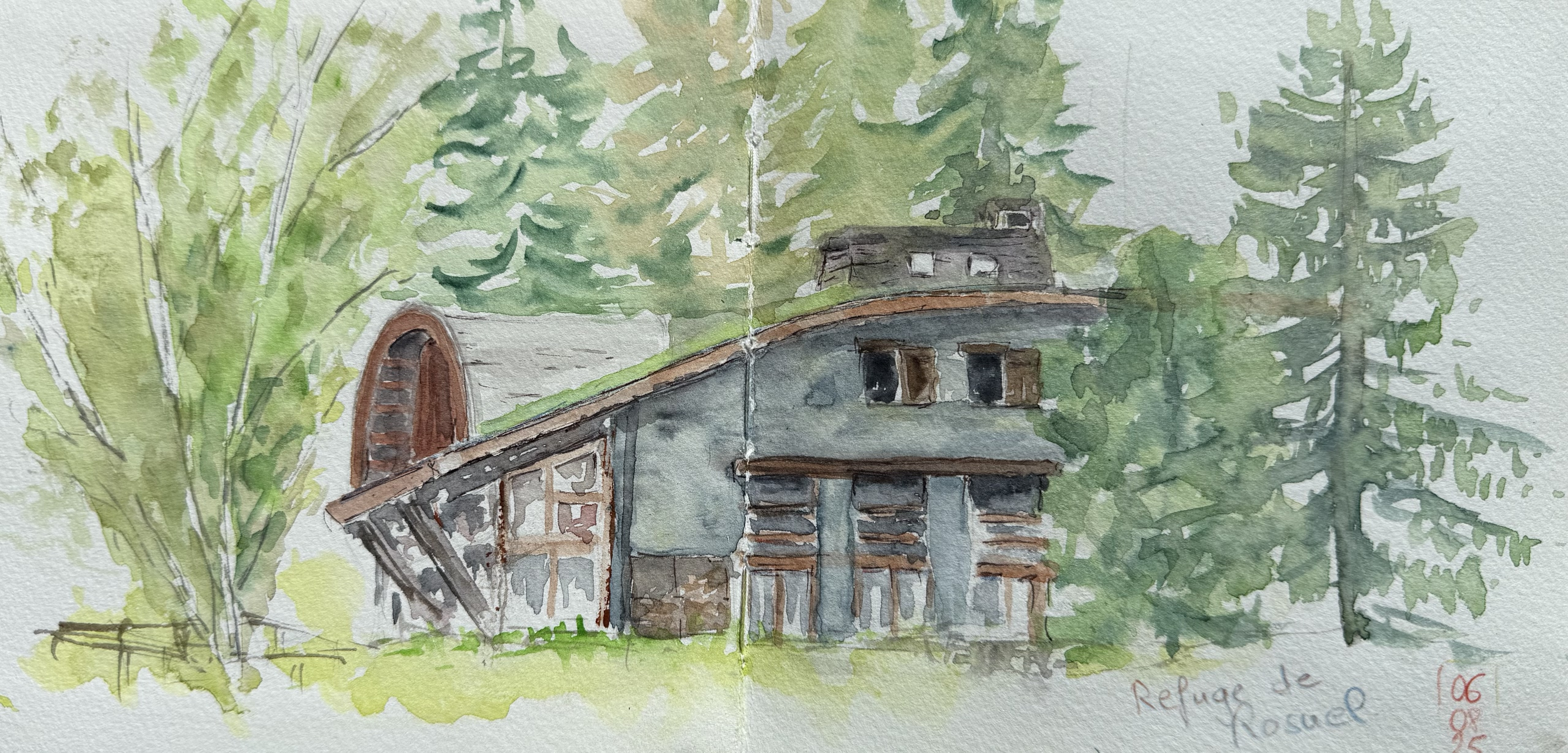
Refuge de Rosuel
