= Refuge Carate Brianza =

Refuge in the Italian Alps

Coordinates: 46°19′48″N 9°54′6″E

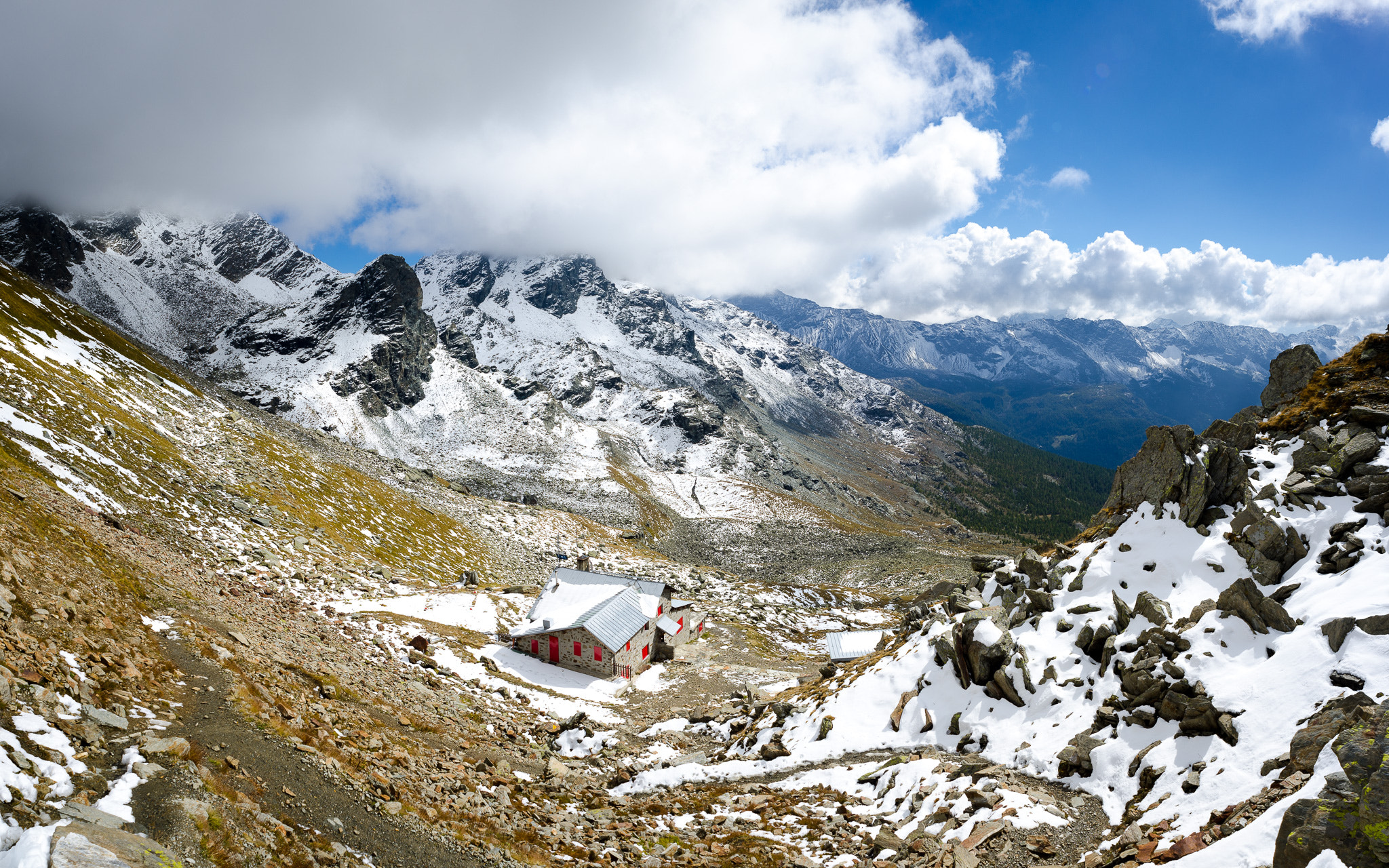
- Interactive map of the Refuge Carate Brianza area

General information
- Location: Lanzada

Refuge Carate Brianza is a refuge in the Alps.
