= Refuge de Turia =

Coordinates: 45°33′12″N 6°52′24″E

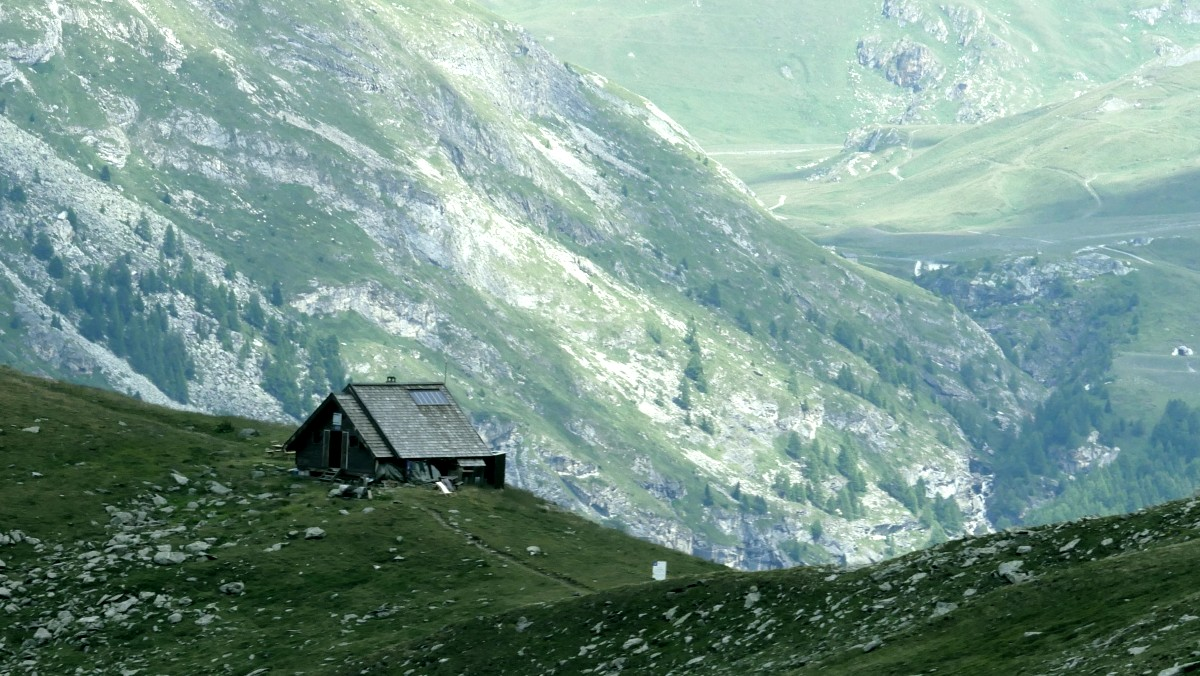
Refuge de Turia

Refuge de Turia is a refuge of Savoie, France. It lies in the Massif de la Vanoise range. It has an altitude of 2427 metres above sea level.
