= Refuge Robert Blanc =

Coordinates: 45°45′56″N 6°46′27″E

Refuge Robert Blanc is a refuge in the Alps at an altitude of 2,750 m, located on the route of the Tour du Mont Blanc.
