= Refuge de la Pilatte =

Coordinates: 44°52′12″N 6°19′55″E

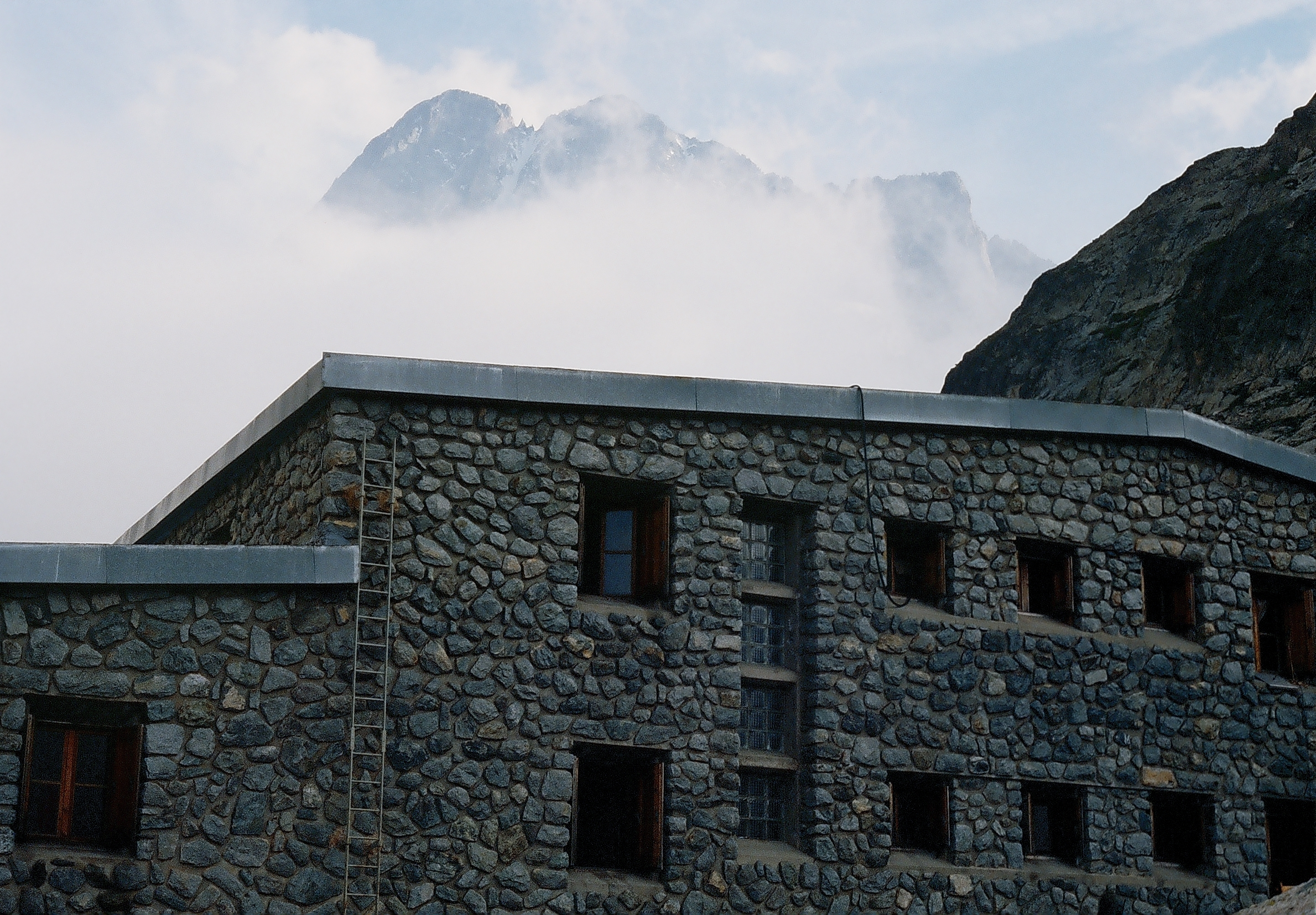
Refuge de la Pilatte

Refuge de la Pilatte is a refuge in the Alps.
