= Refuge Diavolezza =

Mountain hut in the Swiss Alps

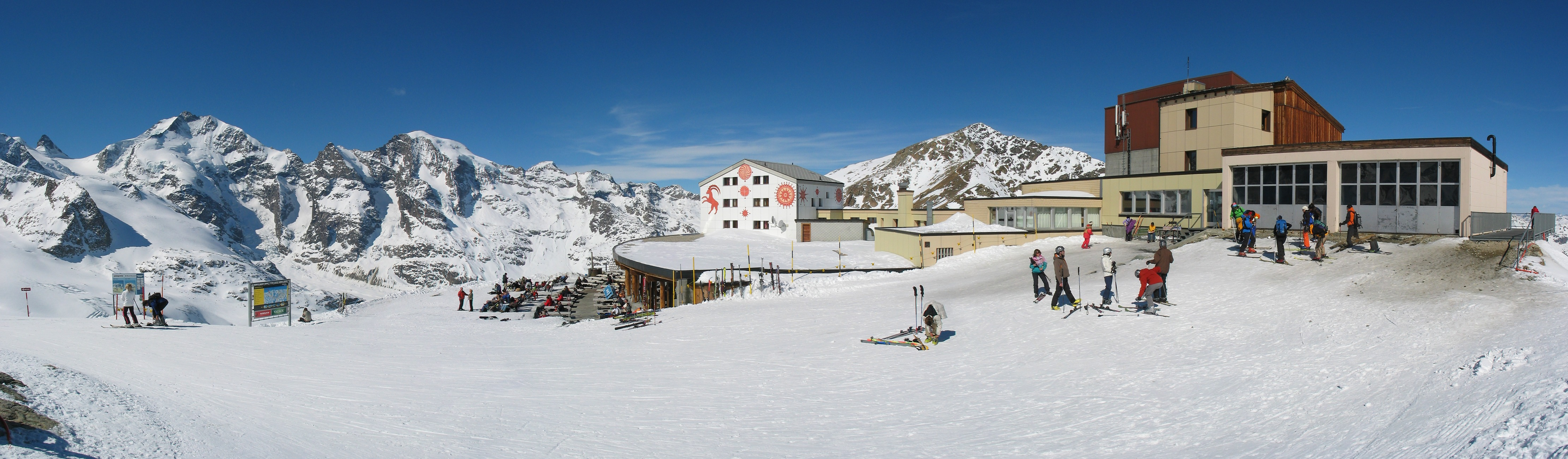
- Diavolezza hut and areal tram station. Start of the Diavolezza ski slope. The Bernina range with Piz Bernina is visible in the background towards the left
- Interactive map of the Refuge Diavolezza area

General information
- Coordinates: 46.412083°N 9.965417°E
- Elevation: 2,972 m (9,751 ft)
- Year built: 1893

Website
- www.corvatsch-diavolezza.ch/en/berghaus-diavolezza/about-the-berghaus-diavolezza

The Refuge Diavolezza is a mountain hut in the Rhaetian Alps in Switzerland 2,972 m (9,751 ft) above sea level. There are 10 double rooms with an en-suite shower and toilet, and dorms for two, four, six, and sixteen people with showers and toilets on the same floor. There is also a restaurant and a Jacuzzi.
