= Refuge du Pelvoux =

Coordinates: 44°52′58″N 6°24′22″E

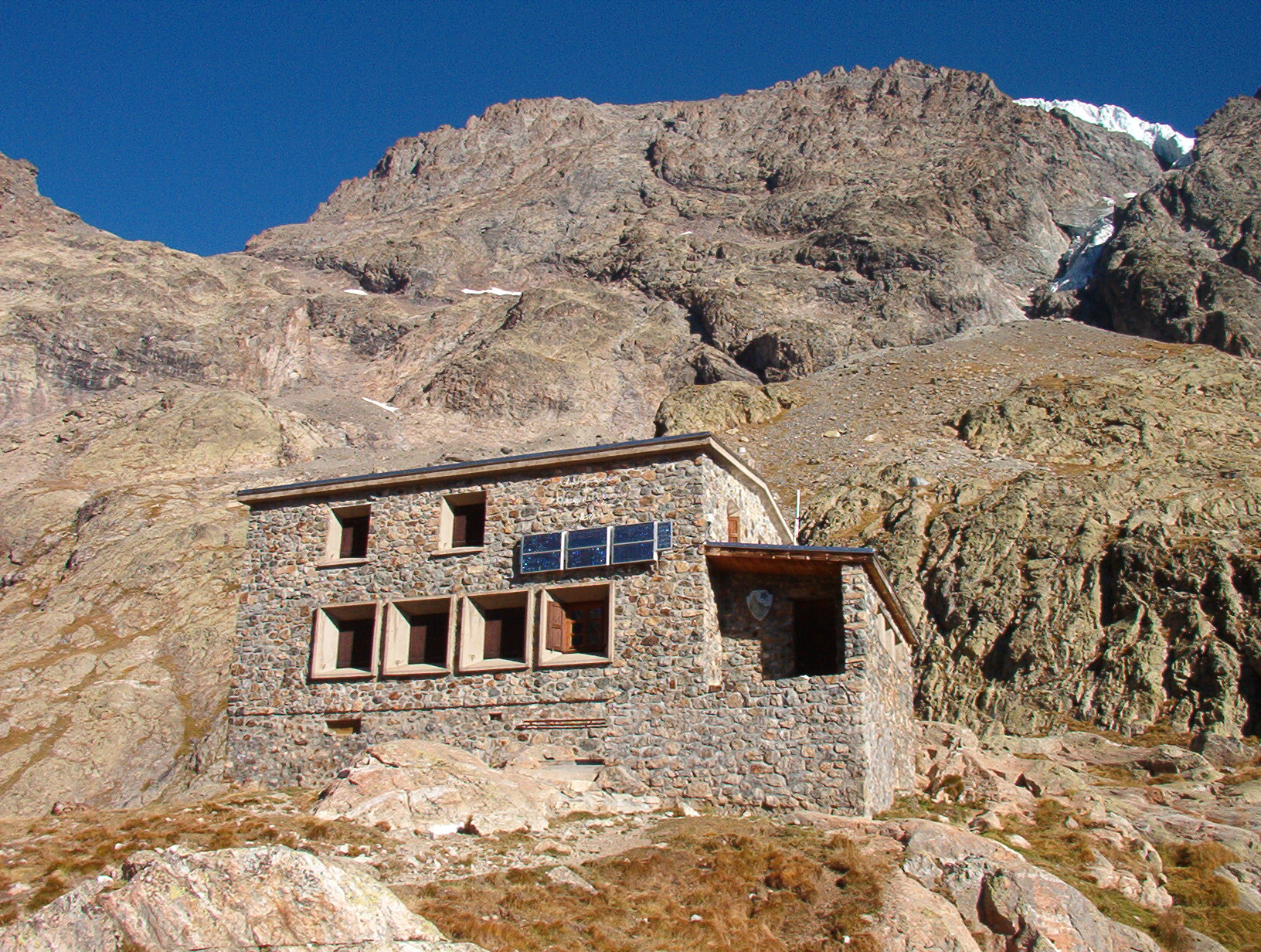
Refuge du Pelvoux

Refuge du Pelvoux is a refuge in the Alps.
