= Rifugio Guido Rey =

Mountain hut in Piedmont, Italy

- Interactive map of the Rifugio Guido Rey area

General information
- Coordinates: 45°02′34″N 6°45′18″E
- Elevation: 1,761 m (5,778 ft)
- Year built: 1940
- Owner: Club Alpino Italiano UGET (Turin)

Rifugio Guido Rey is a refuge in the Cottian Alps, near the village of Beaulard, in Piedmont region, Italy.

== History ==
The hut, which belongs to the Club Alpino Italiano (CAI-Uget di Torino branch), was realised restoring a former military building.
