= Refuge de Véran =

Coordinates: 45°58′45″N 6°40′13″E

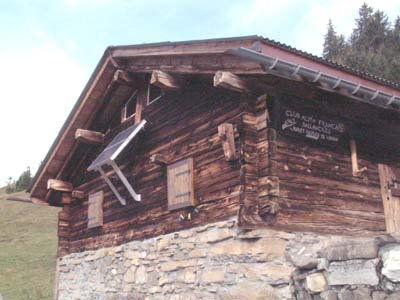
Refuge de Véran

Refuge de Véran is a refuge in the Alps.
