= Refuge du col de la Croix du Bonhomme =

Coordinates: 45°44′06″N 6°42′22″E

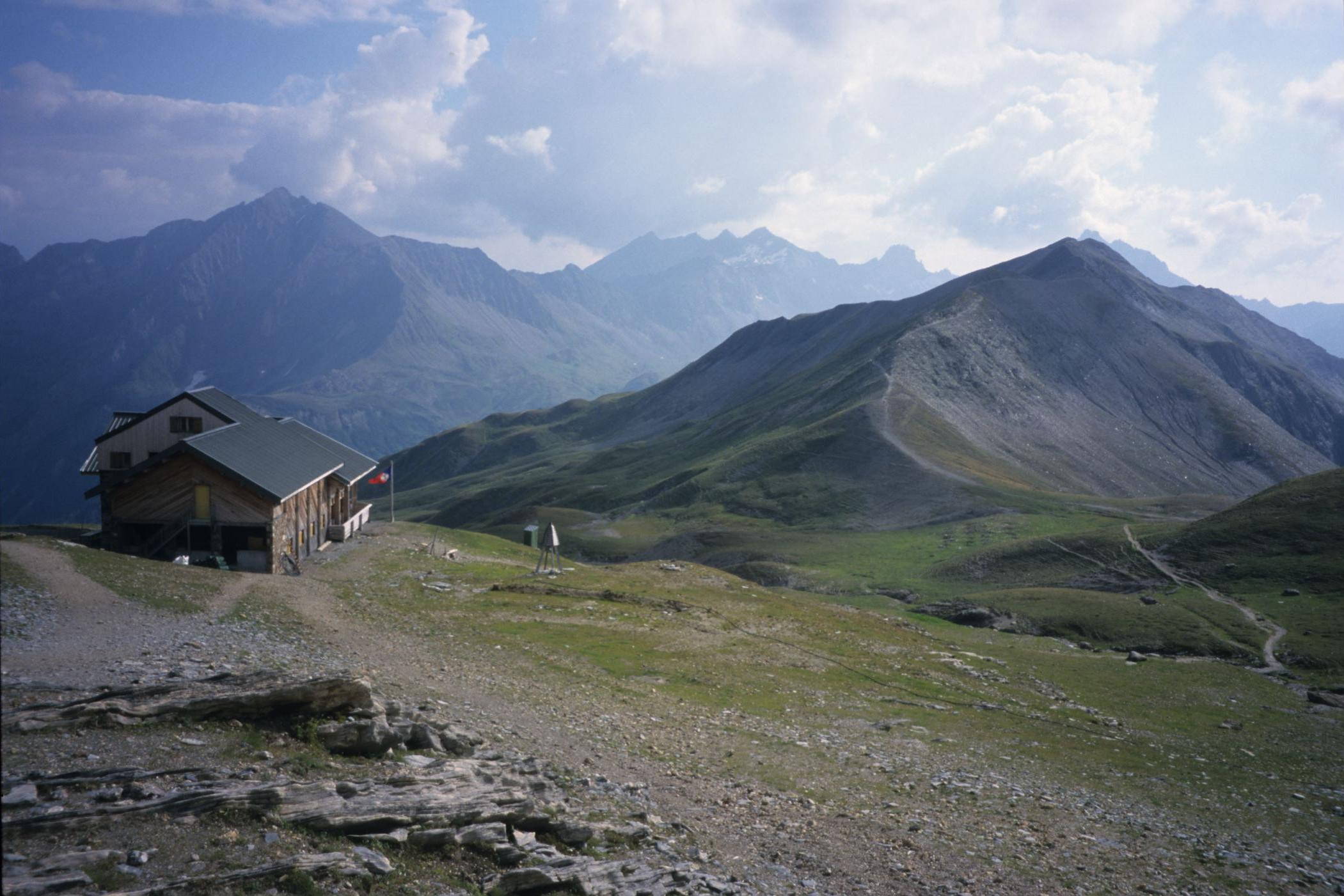
Refuge du col de la Croix du Bonhomme

Refuge du col de la Croix du Bonhomme is a refuge in the Alps.
