= Refuge du Roc de la Pêche =

Refuge in the Alps

Coordinates: 45°19′40″N 6°41′29″E

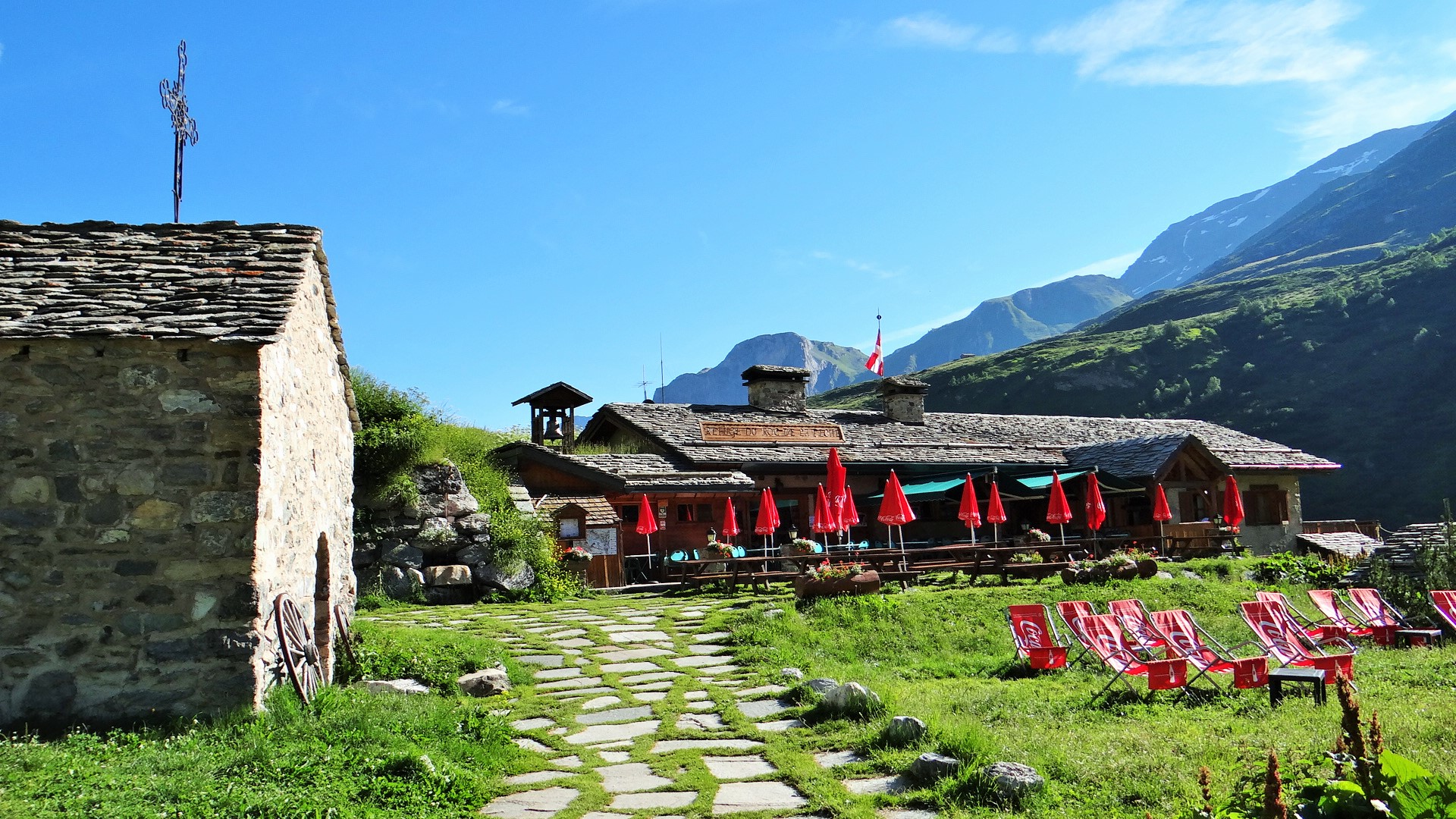
Refuge du Roc de la Pêche 2016 (2)

Refuge du Roc de la Pêche is a refuge in the Alps.
