= Refuge de l'Arpont =

French refuge in the Alps

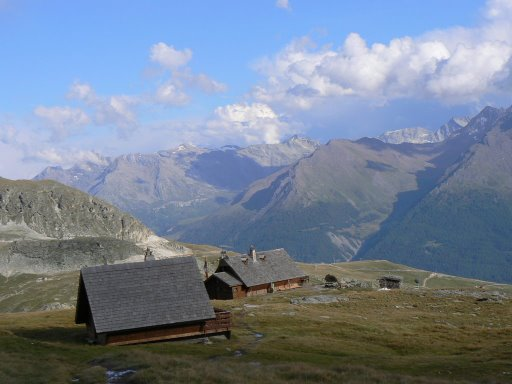

- Location within Alps

General information
- Coordinates: 45°19′09″N 6°47′35″E
- Elevation: 2,309 m (7,575 ft)

Refuge de l'Arpont is a refuge in the Alps.The original structure was built in 1969, but large-scale renovations on it began in late 2012, costing €2 540 000 . The hut is located north of Val-Cenis, near the ruisseau de l'Île (lit. stream of the island).
