= Refuge du Mont Thabor =

Coordinates: 45°07′23″N 6°36′00″E

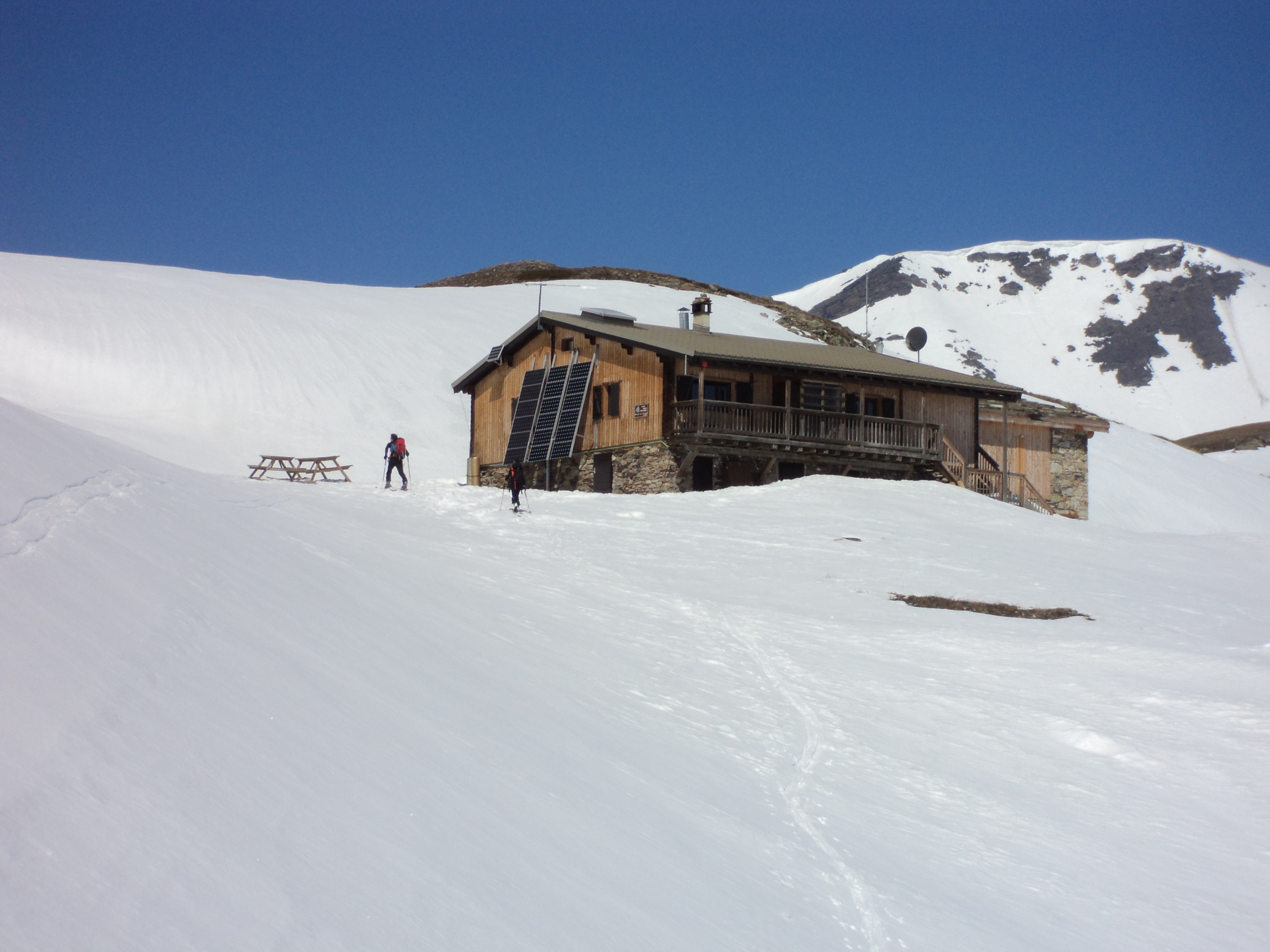
Refuge du Mont Thabor

Refuge du Mont Thabor is a high-altitude refuge in the French Alps. The hut is elevated 2,502 meters (8,208 feet) above the Cerces masssif, near Lac Rond and the border with Italy.

The hut has a maximum capacity of 46 individuals and is operated by the Club Alpin Français. Guests are expected to be entirely self-sufficient during their stay, including bringing their own equipment (tent, sleeping gear, gas stove, etc). From 344 Google reviews, the hut boasts a rating of 4.5 stars.

Refuge de Mont Thabor is currently closed for bookings, which will re-open for the summer on June 13.
