= Refuge alpin du Tour =

Coordinates: 46°00′05″N 6°56′51″E

Refuge alpin du Tour is a refuge in the Alps in France.
