= Refuge du Sélé =

Coordinates: 44°52′24″N 6°23′27″E

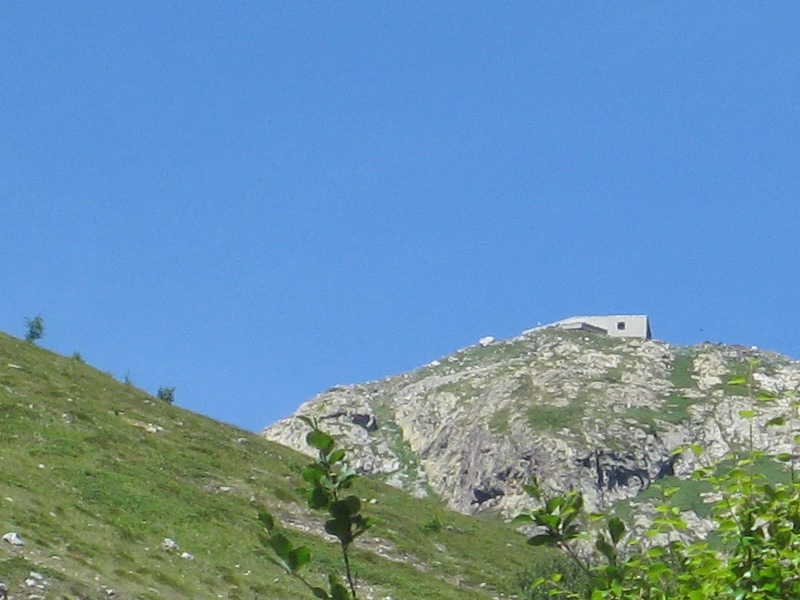

Refuge du Sélé is a refuge in the Alps.
