= Refuge de la Femma =

Alpine Refuge

Coordinates: 45°21′47″N 6°55′44″E

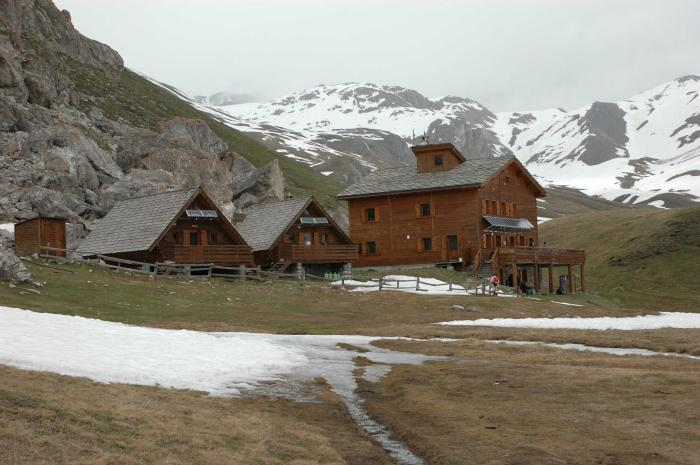
View of the refuge

Refuge de la Femma is a refuge in the Alps.
