= Refuge de la Pointe Percée =

Coordinates: 45°57′21″N 6°32′39″E

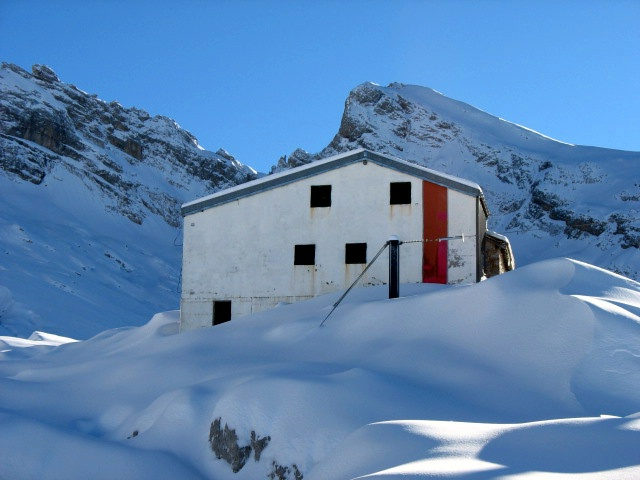
Refuge de la Pointe Percée

Refuge de la Pointe Percée is a refuge in the Alps.
