= Refuge du Col du Palet =

Coordinates: 45°27′31″N 6°51′40″E

Refuge du Col du Palet is a refuge of Savoie, France. It lies in the Massif de la Vanoise range.
