= Refuge des Anges au Morion =

Coordinates: 45°37′28″N 7°1′47″E

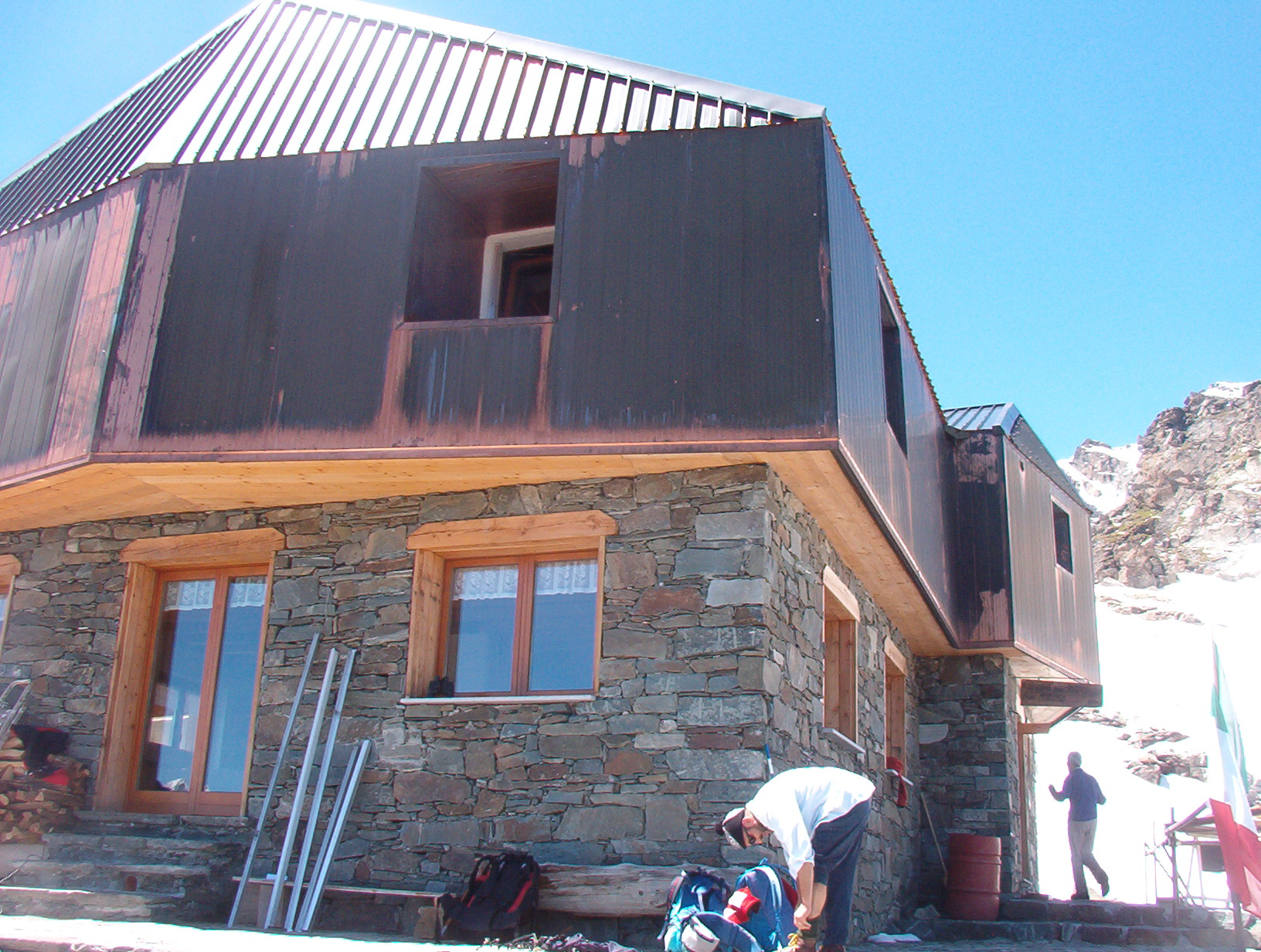

Refuge des Anges au Morion is a refuge in the Alps in Italy.
