= Refuge de l'Archeboc =

Coordinates: 45°36′08″N 6°57′32″E

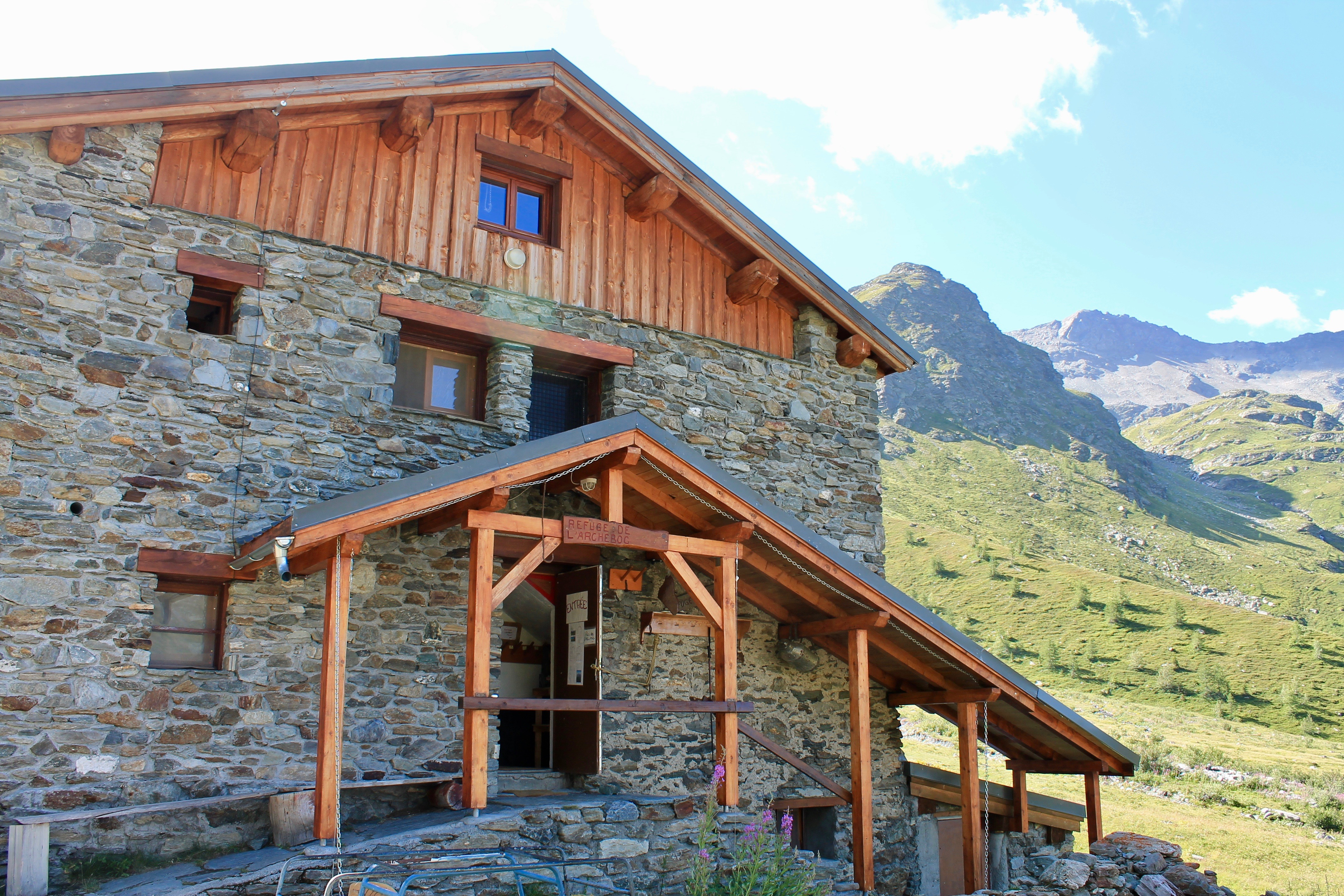

Refuge de l'Archeboc is a refuge in the Alps.
