= Refuge de La Martin =

Refuge in the French Alps

Coordinates: 45°31′26″N 6°54′01″E

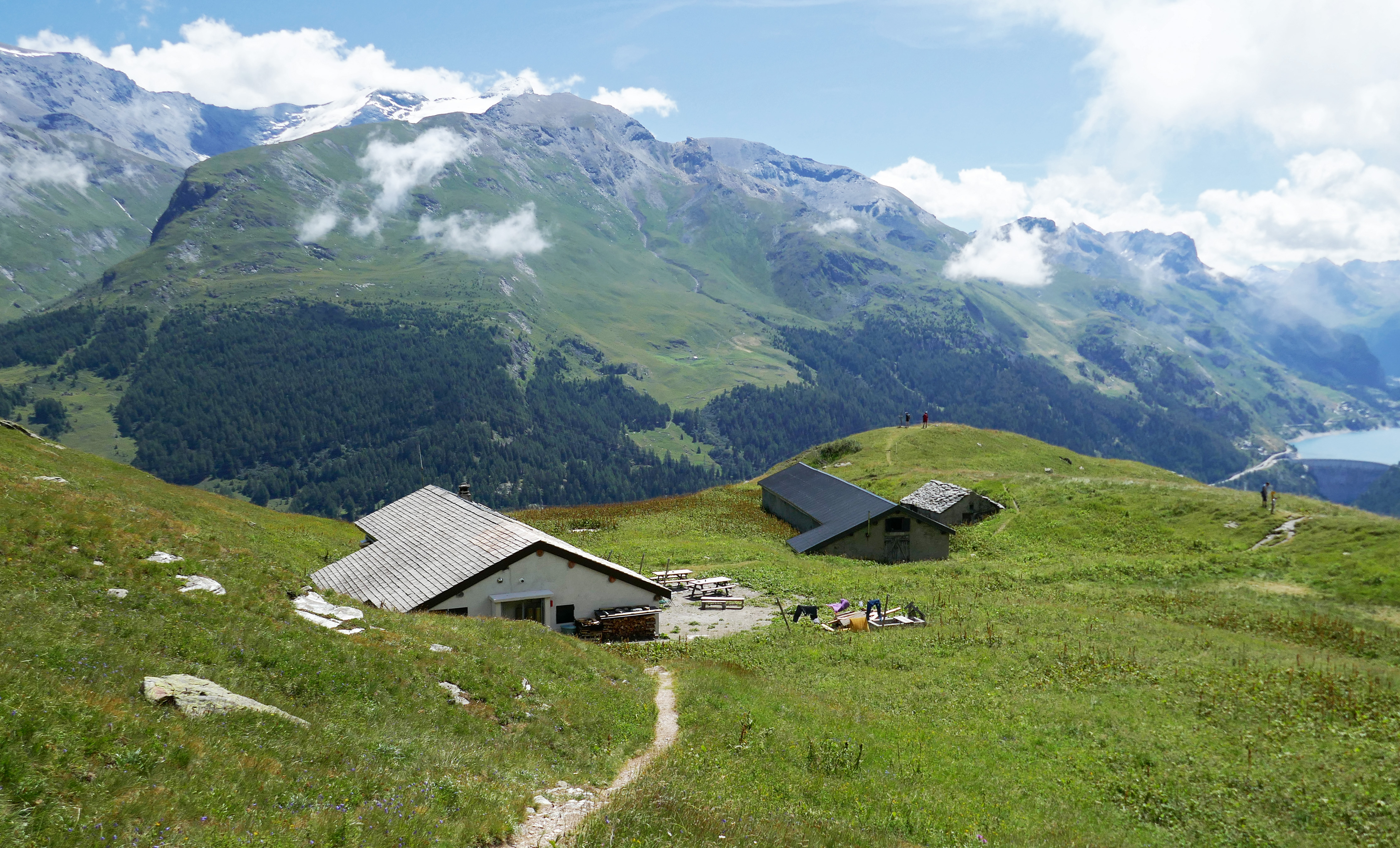
Refuge de la Martin 3.jpg

Refuge de La Martin is a refuge in the Alps, near Tignes and Val d'Isère mountain-ski resorts.

http://www.refugelamartin.fr
