= Refuge de l'Aigle =

Alpine refuge in France

Coordinates: 45°00′41″N 6°19′28″E

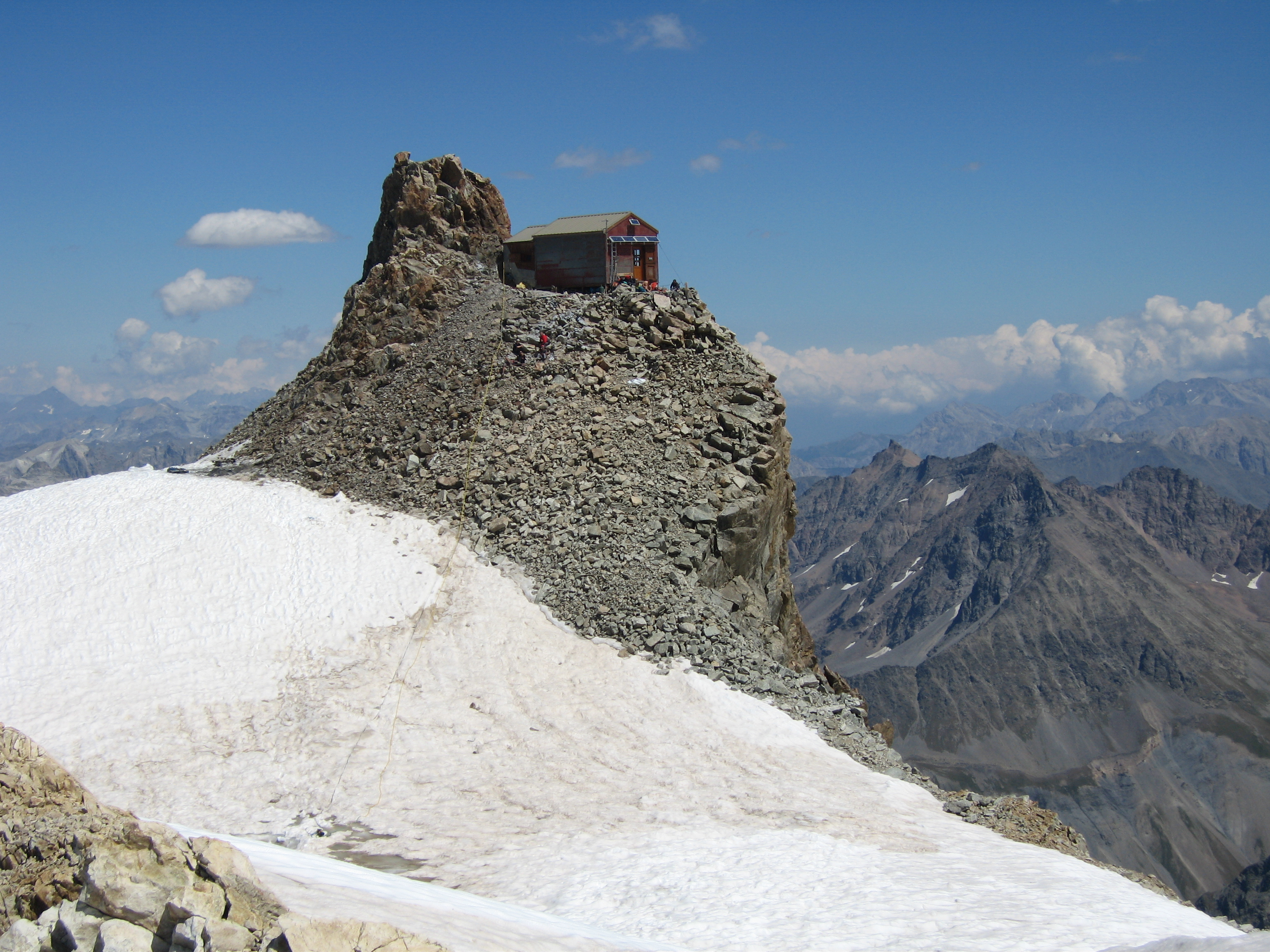

Refuge de l'Aigle is a refuge in the Alps in France. It opened in 1910 and was renovated during the summer 2014, and therefore closed between September 2013 and August 2014.
