= Refuge de la Traie =

Coordinates: 45°25′41″N 6°31′55″E

Refuge de la Traye or Traye is a refuge in the Alps. Created in 1982, it closes to the autumn of 2017; it is completely renovated and extended in 2019 to accommodate the first high-end refuge in the French Alps.
