= Refuge du Parmelan =

Coordinates: 45°56′47″N 6°14′23″E

Refuge du Parmelan is a refuge in the Alps.
