= Refuge du Folly =

Refuge in the Alps

Coordinates: 46°06′08″N 6°46′21″E

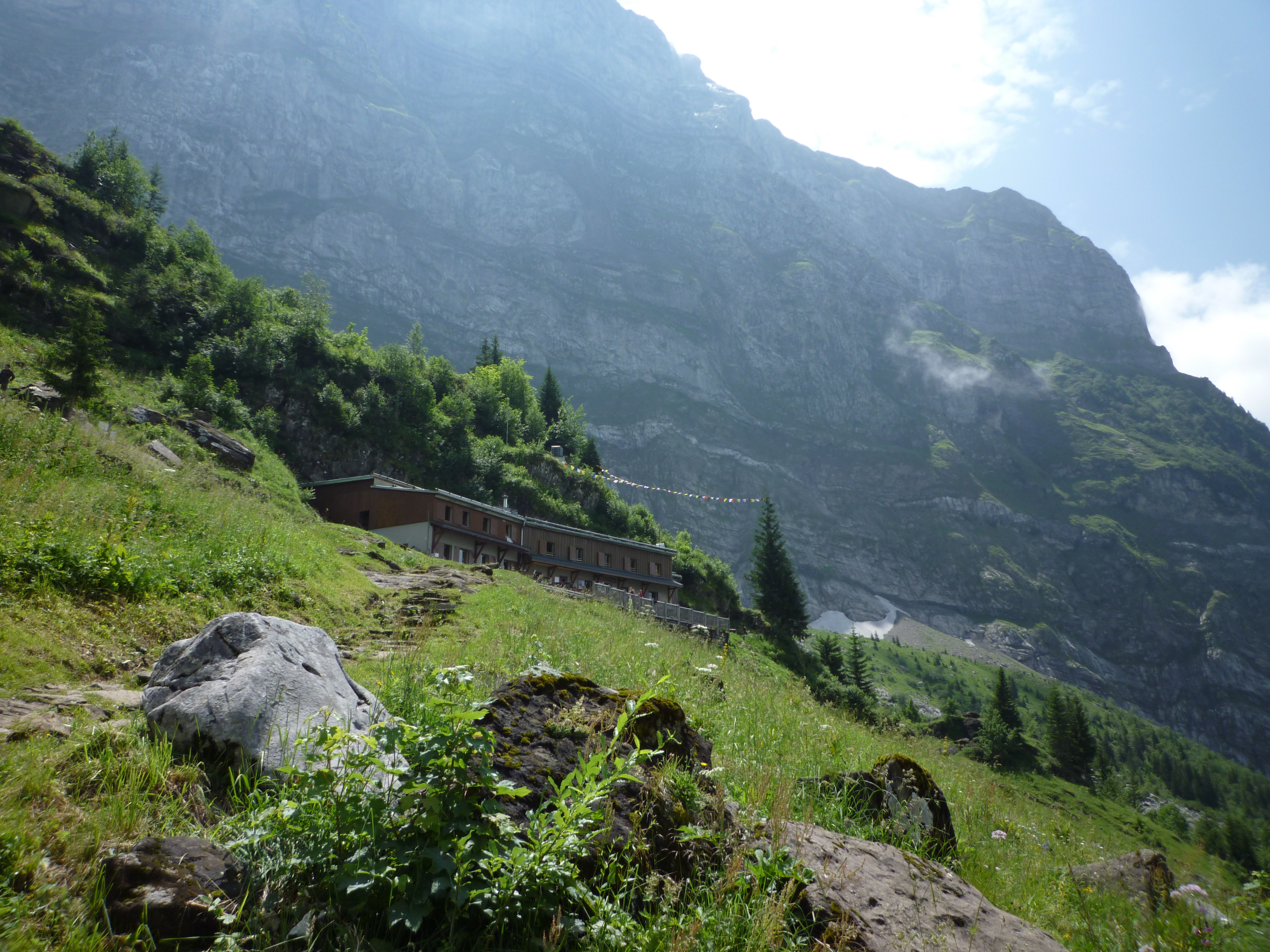
Refuge de Folly, 1558m

Refuge du Folly is a refuge in the Alps, located in Haute-Savoie department, in France. Its capacity is 72 persons. It has both private rooms and dorms.
