= Refuge Barmasse =

Coordinates: 45°52′39″N 7°35′40″E

Refuge Barmasse is a refuge in the Alps in Aosta Valley, Italy.
