= Refuge de la Fournache =

Coordinates: 45°16′07″N 6°43′44″E

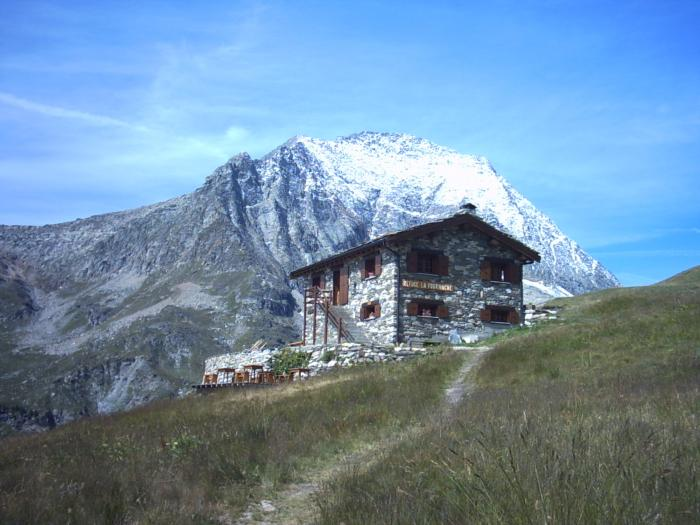

Refuge de la Fournache is a refuge of Savoie, France. It lies in the Massif de la Vanoise range. It has an altitude of 2,330 metres above sea level.
