= Refuge Sogno de Berdzé au Péradza =

Coordinates: 45°35′45″N 7°29′16″E

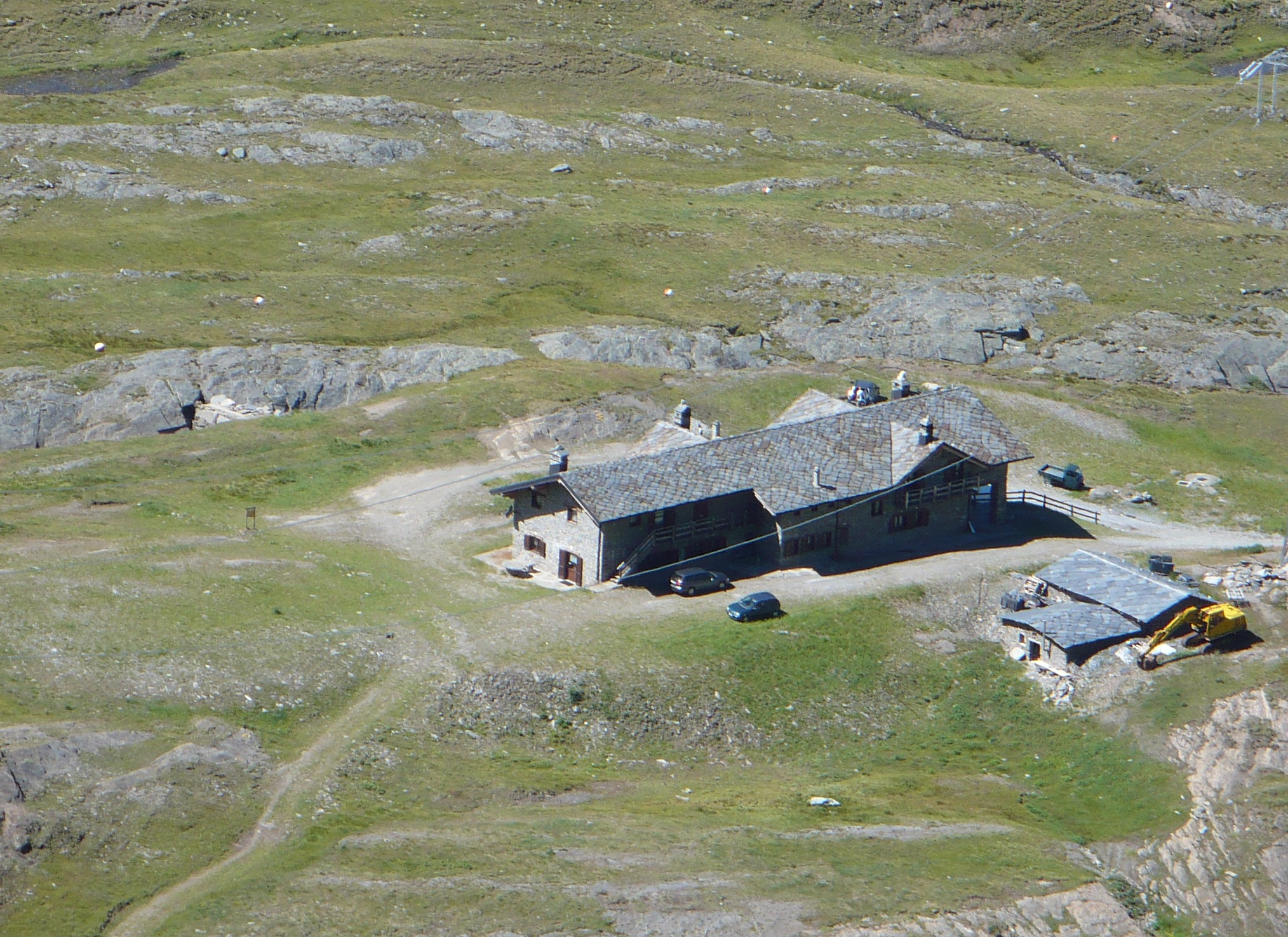
Rifugio Sogno berzé Péradza - Aosta Valley - Italy

Refuge Sogno de Berdzé au Péradza is a refuge in the Alps in Aosta Valley, Italy.
