= Refuge Marinelli Bombardieri =

Coordinates: 46°20′40″N 9°54′19″E

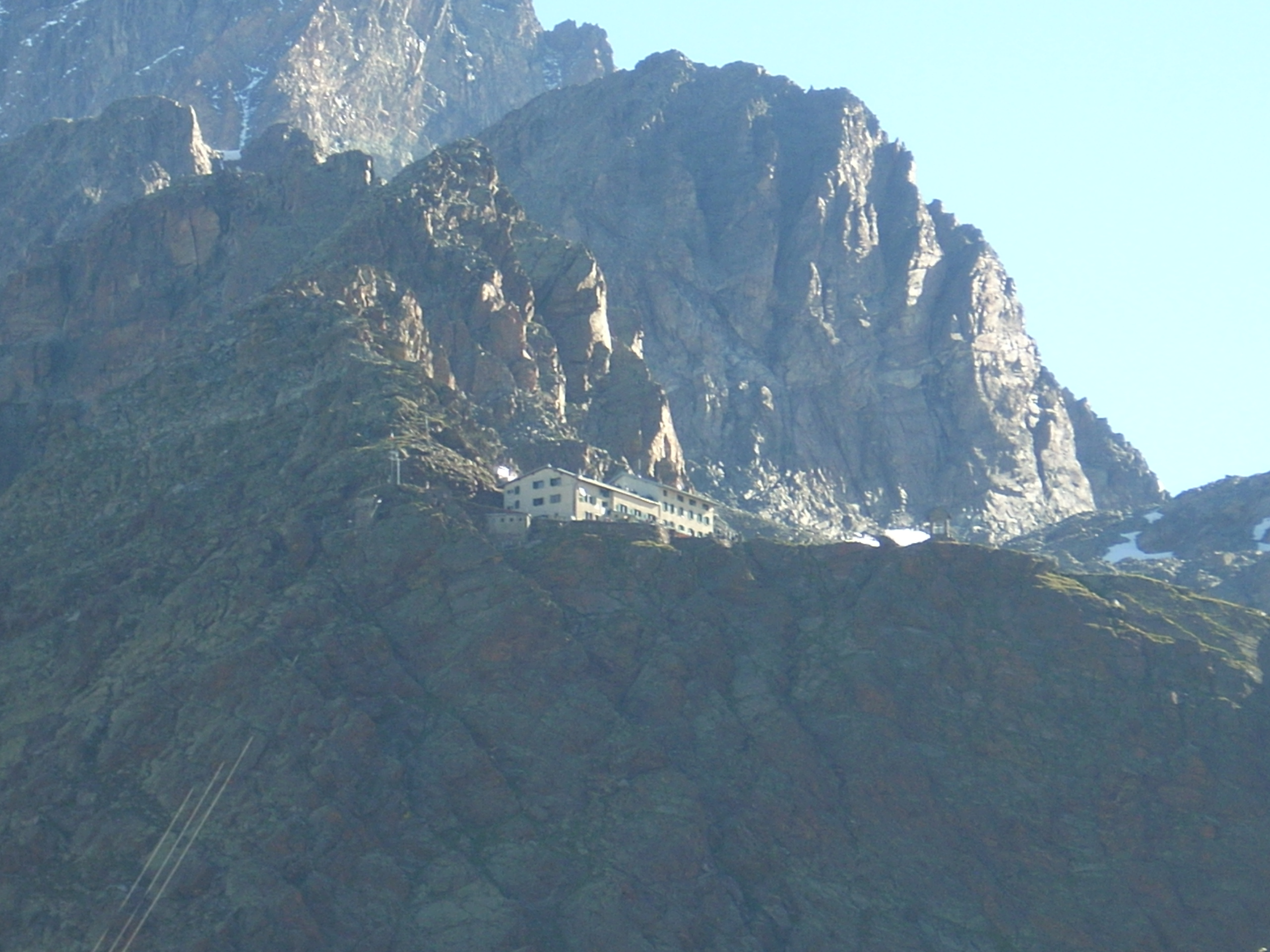
Refuge Marinelli Bombardieri

Refuge Marinelli Bombardieri is a refuge in the Alps.
