= Refuge de Vallonbrun =

Coordinates: 45°18′37″N 6°56′14″E

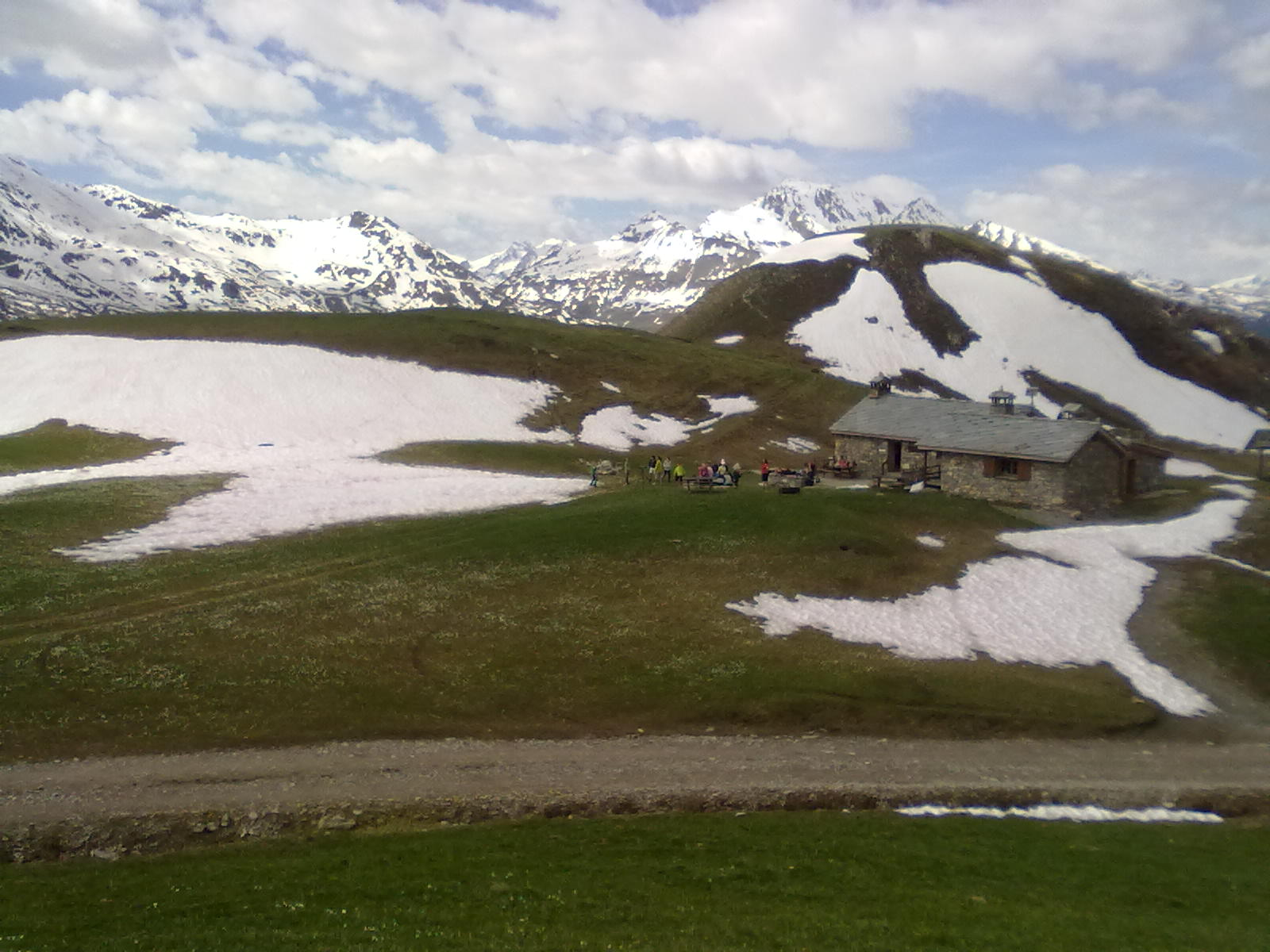
Vallonbrun's refuge picture

Refuge de Vallonbrun is a refuge of Savoie, France. It lies in the Massif de la Vanoise range. It has an altitude of 2,272 metres above sea level.
