= Refuge de Presset =

Hut in the Alps

Coordinates: 45°39′11″N 6°39′58″E

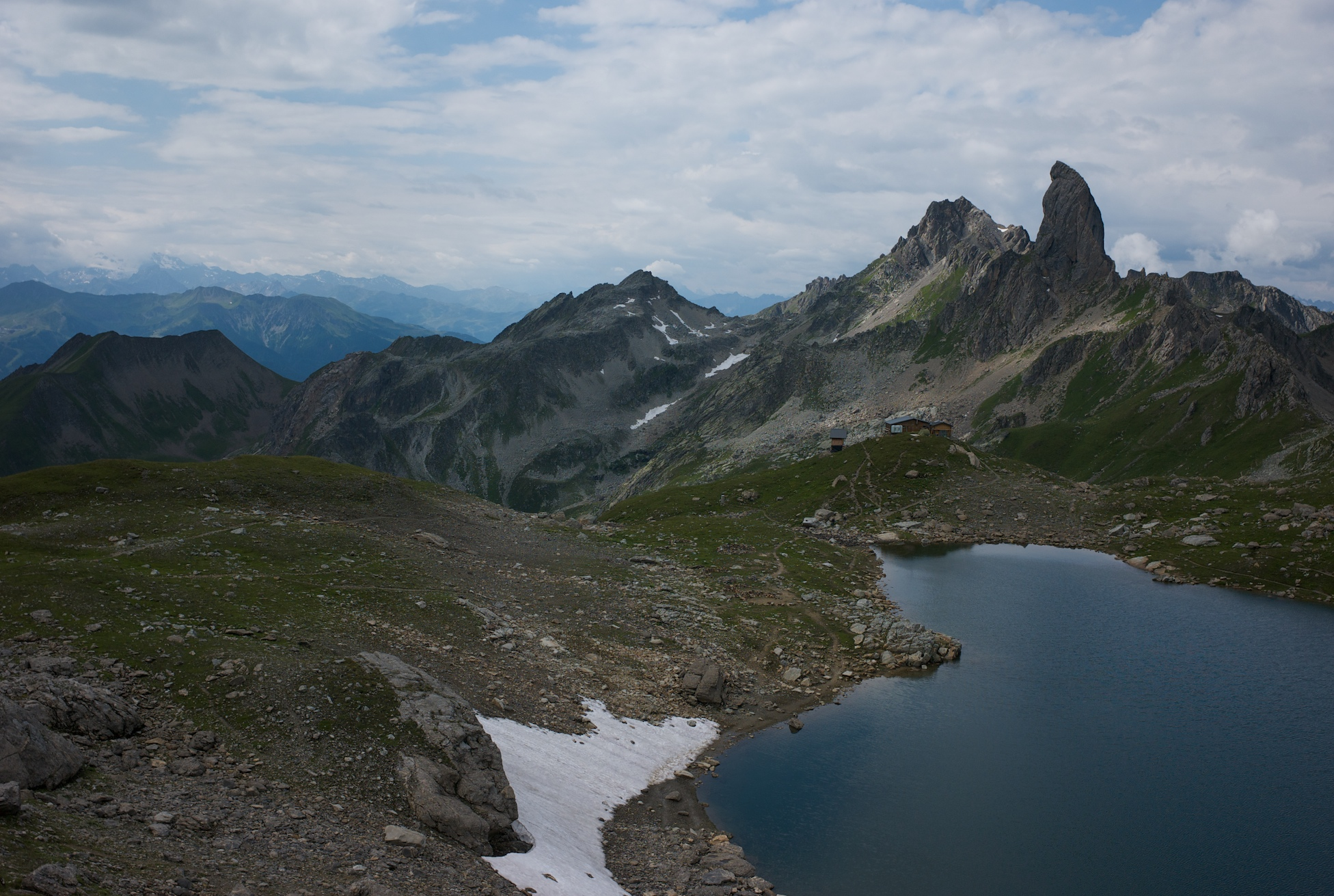
Refuge de Presset, Savoie, France

Refuge de Presset is a refuge in the Alps.

== History ==
The shelter was built in 1966 and expanded in 1972. Construction of a new shelter began in September 2012; the upgraded site opened in August 2013.
