= Refuge des Bans =

Coordinates: 44°50′04″N 6°21′42″E

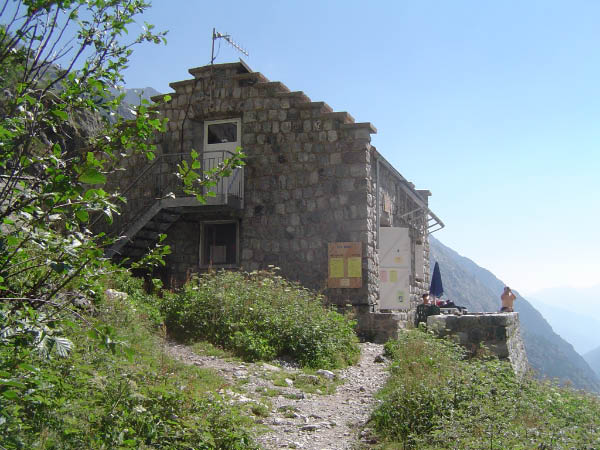

Refuge des Bans is a refuge in the Alps in France.
