= Refuge du Fond des Fours =

Coordinates: 45°24′04″N 6°59′31″E

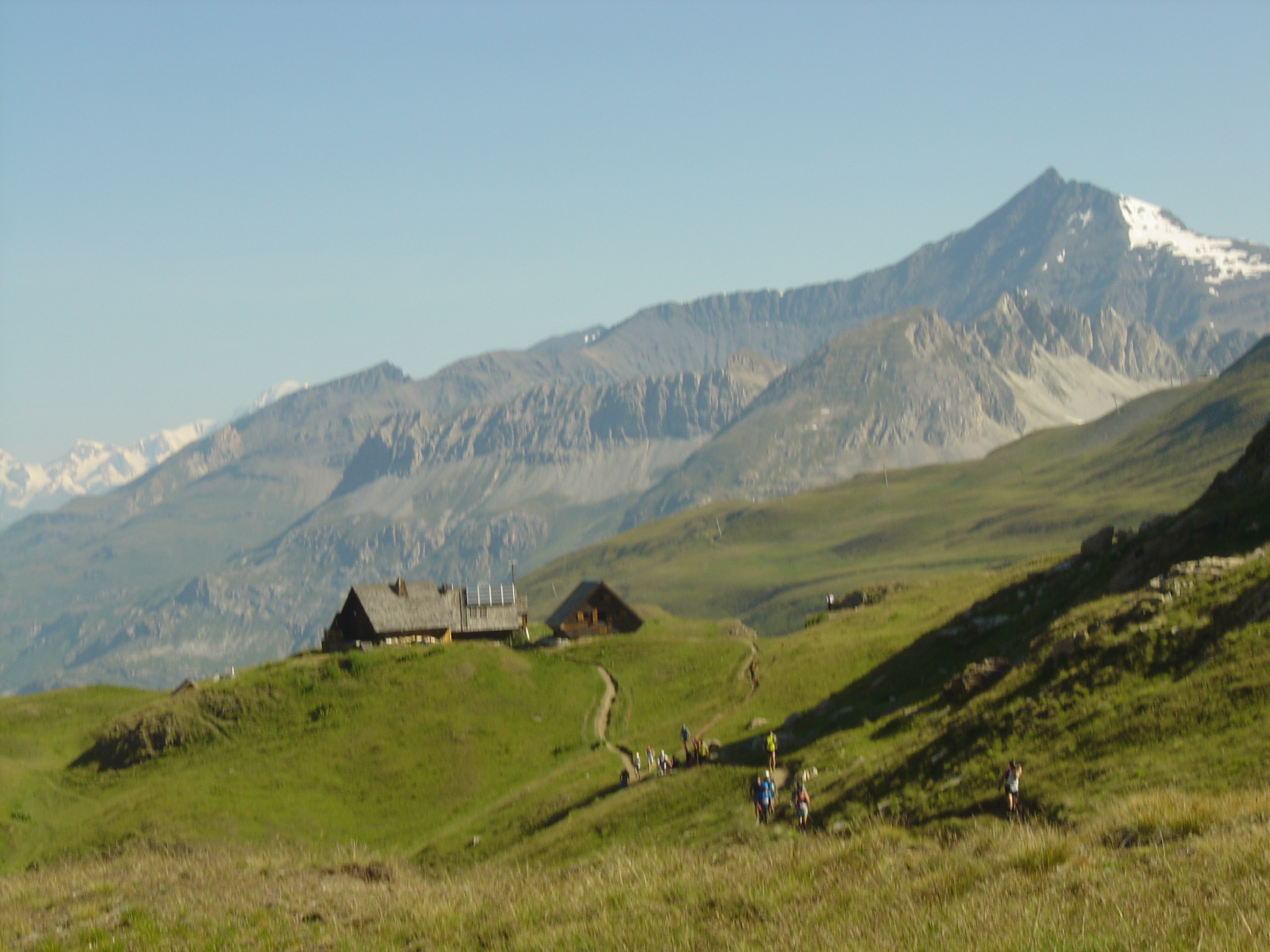
Refuge du Fond des Fours

Refuge du Fond des Fours is a refuge in the Alps.
