= Refuge de Tré la Tête =

Mountain hut in the French Alps

Coordinates: 45°47′31″N 6°44′05″E

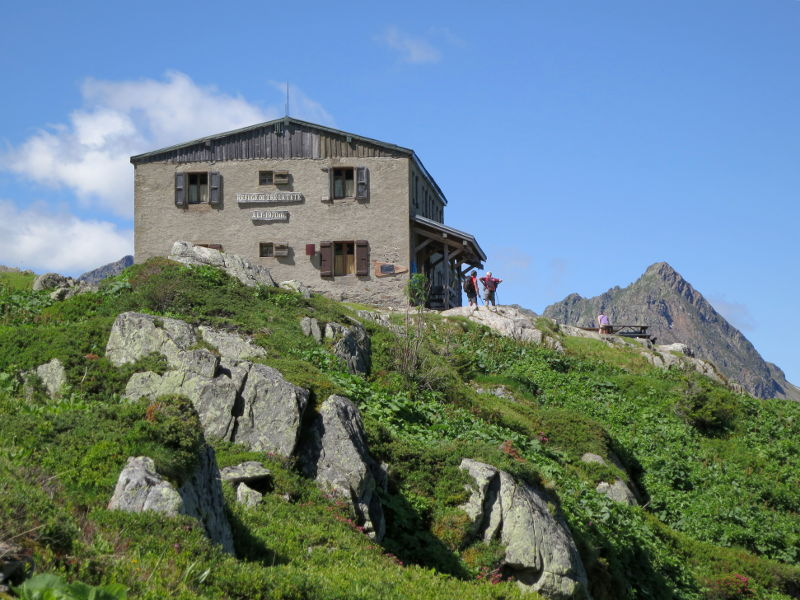
Refuge De Tré La Tête

Refuge de Tré la Tête is a refuge in the Mont Blanc massif in the Alps.
