= Refuge de la Valmasque =

Coordinates: 44°06′29″N 7°26′51″E

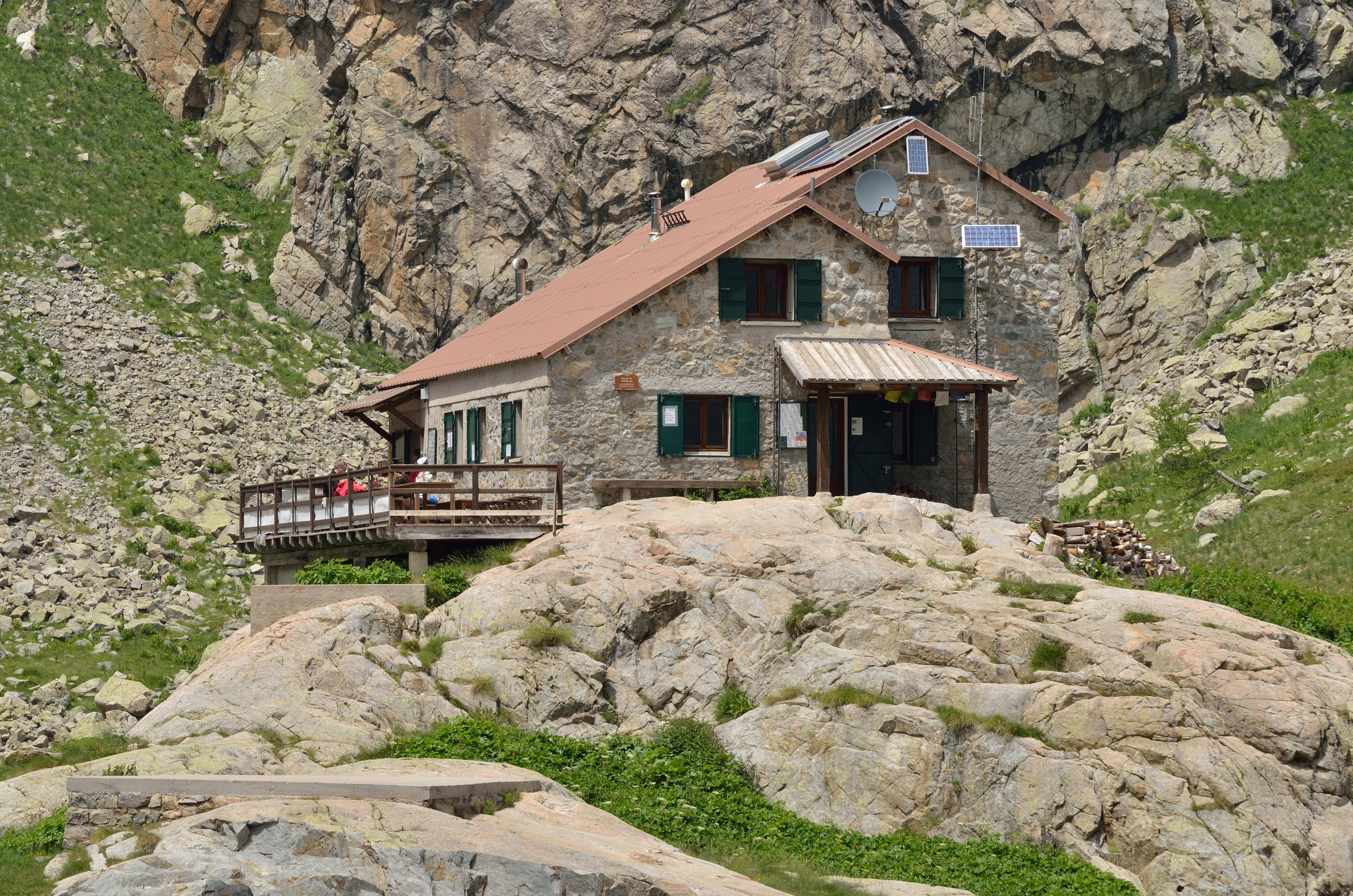
Refuge de la Valmasque

Refuge de la Valmasque is a refuge in the Alps-Maritimes. It is located in the French National Parc Mercantour.
