= Refuge de La Valette =

Coordinates: 45°21′17″N 6°43′32″E

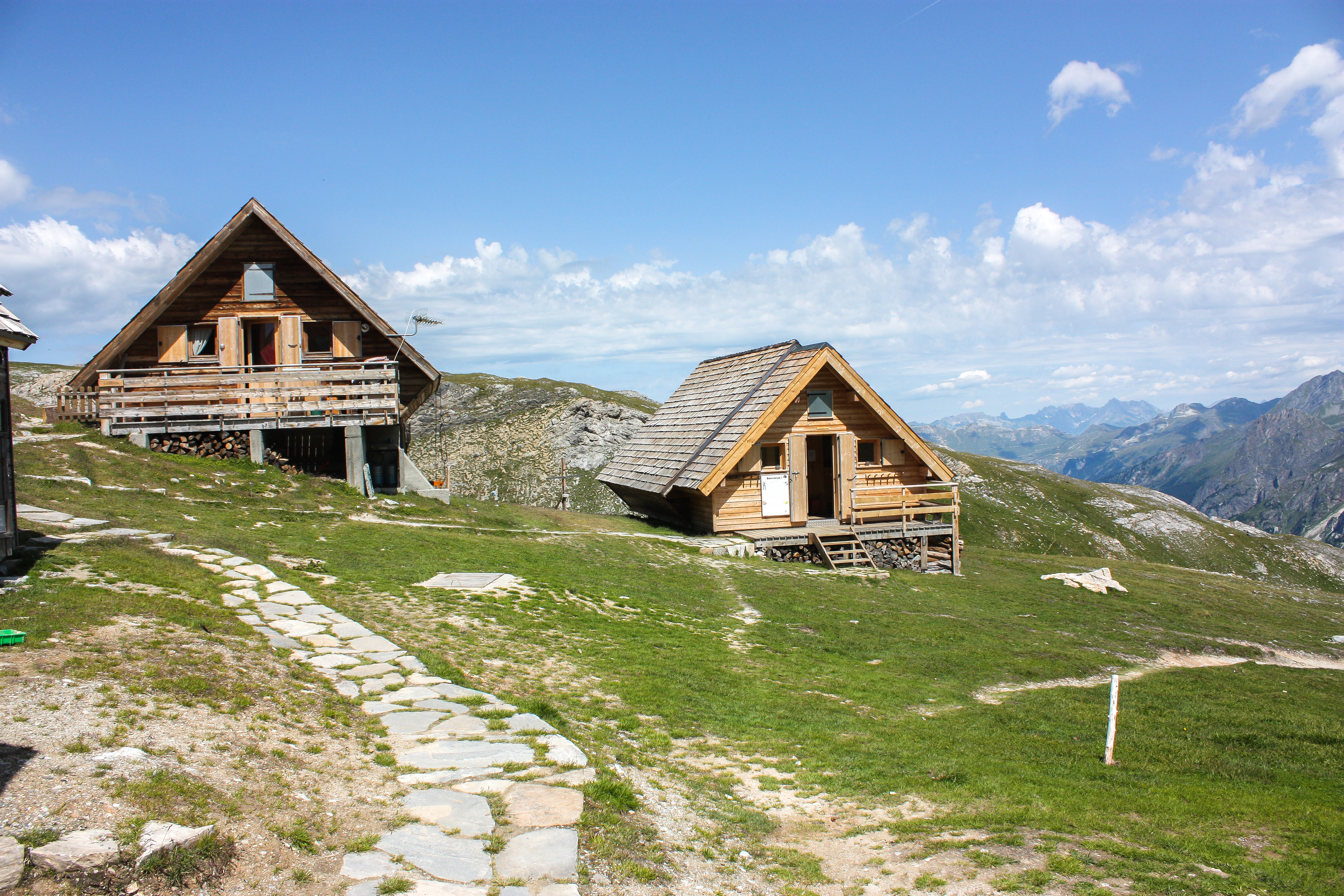
Refuge de la Valette

Refuge de La Valette is a refuge in the French Alps, located in the town of Pralognan-la-Vanoise and a stop on the Tour des Glaciers de la Vanoise.

From the refuge, the view is clear to Grande Casse (3,855 m, highest point of Savoy), the Grand Bec and the needles of Péclet and Péclet.

The hut is owned by the Vanoise National Park and run by Julie Vingère et Baptiste Ginollin (two nature and mountain enthusiasts)

== History ==
The first refuge on the site (Refuge des Lacs) was built in 1899 . But during its first winter, a strong storm pulls off its roof; the reopening happened in 1900 .

The refuge has recently been completely rebuilt in 1970 in its current form. The old refuge is still visible 250m higher, next to the small lake.

== Access ==
Multiples accesses are possible:

- by the Chalet des Nants (from the hamlet of "Prioux" to 1,710 m altitude, fastest access) (2,5 hours);
- by the Donkey's step (Pas de l’âne) and the Tambour pass (from Pralognan-la-Vanoise, Isertan) (3,5 hours);
- by the Chalets de Montaimont (from Prioux, Roc de la Pêche hut or from Péclet-Polset hut, 5h)
- by the cirques de l'Arcelin, du Grand Marchet et du Petit Marchet (from Col de la Vanoise hut, 6h)

== Facilities ==
The refuge is made up of three small separate wooden chalets. One includes the dining room and kitchen, another sleeping for professionals (guides, park agents, and caretaker) and the last one is a dormitory for hikers.
