= Refuge du lac du Lou =

French building

Coordinates: 45°17′35″N 6°31′52″E

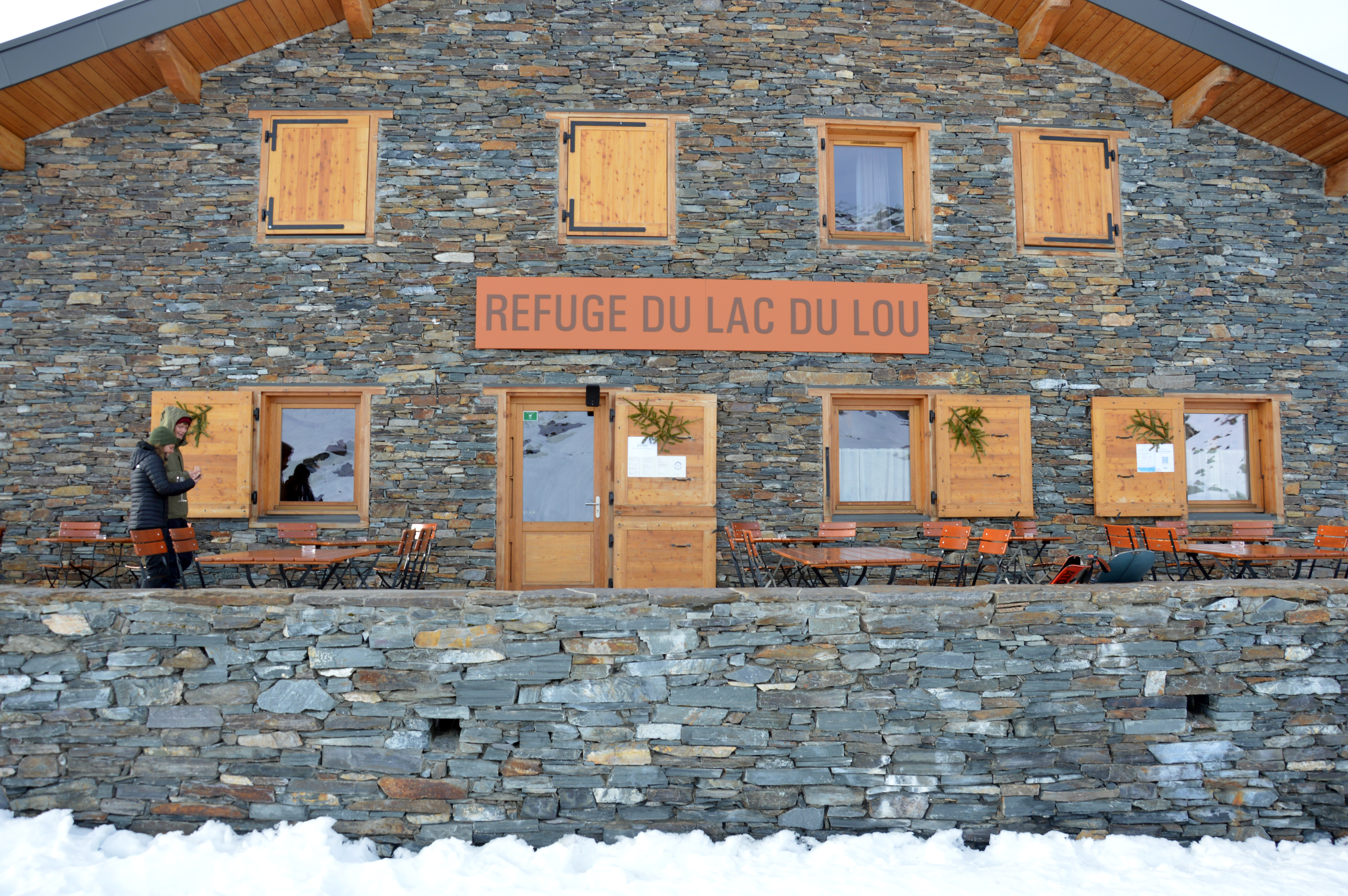
Refuge du lac du Lou

Refuge du lac du Lou is a refuge in the Alps.
