= Refuge de Platé =

Refuge in the Alps

Coordinates: 45°57′56″N 6°43′01″E

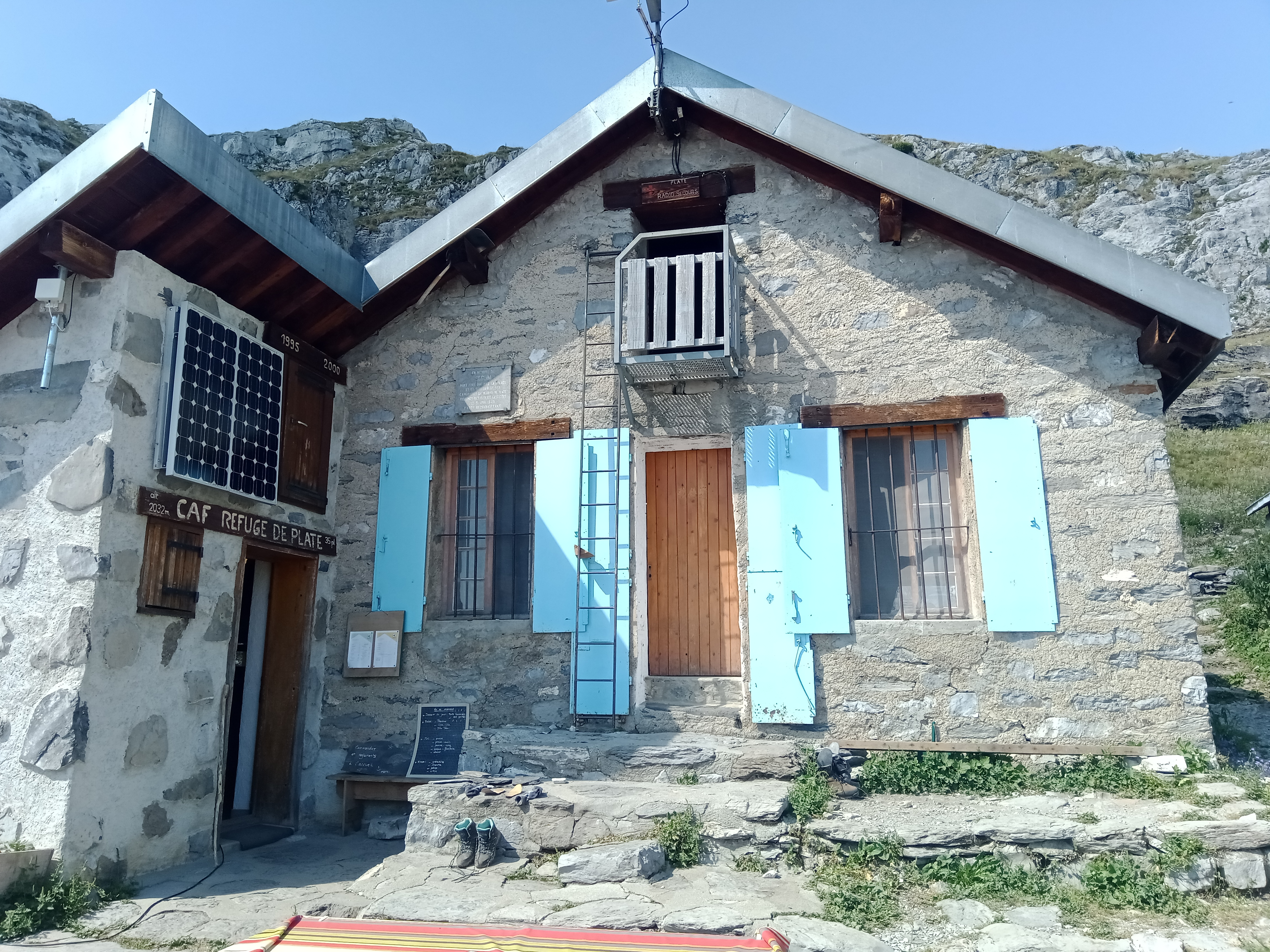

Refuge de Platé is a refuge located on the "Tour des Fiz", in Haute Savoie, facing Mont Blanc in the Alps.
