= Refuge du Cuchet =

Coordinates: 45°18′03″N 6°52′47″E

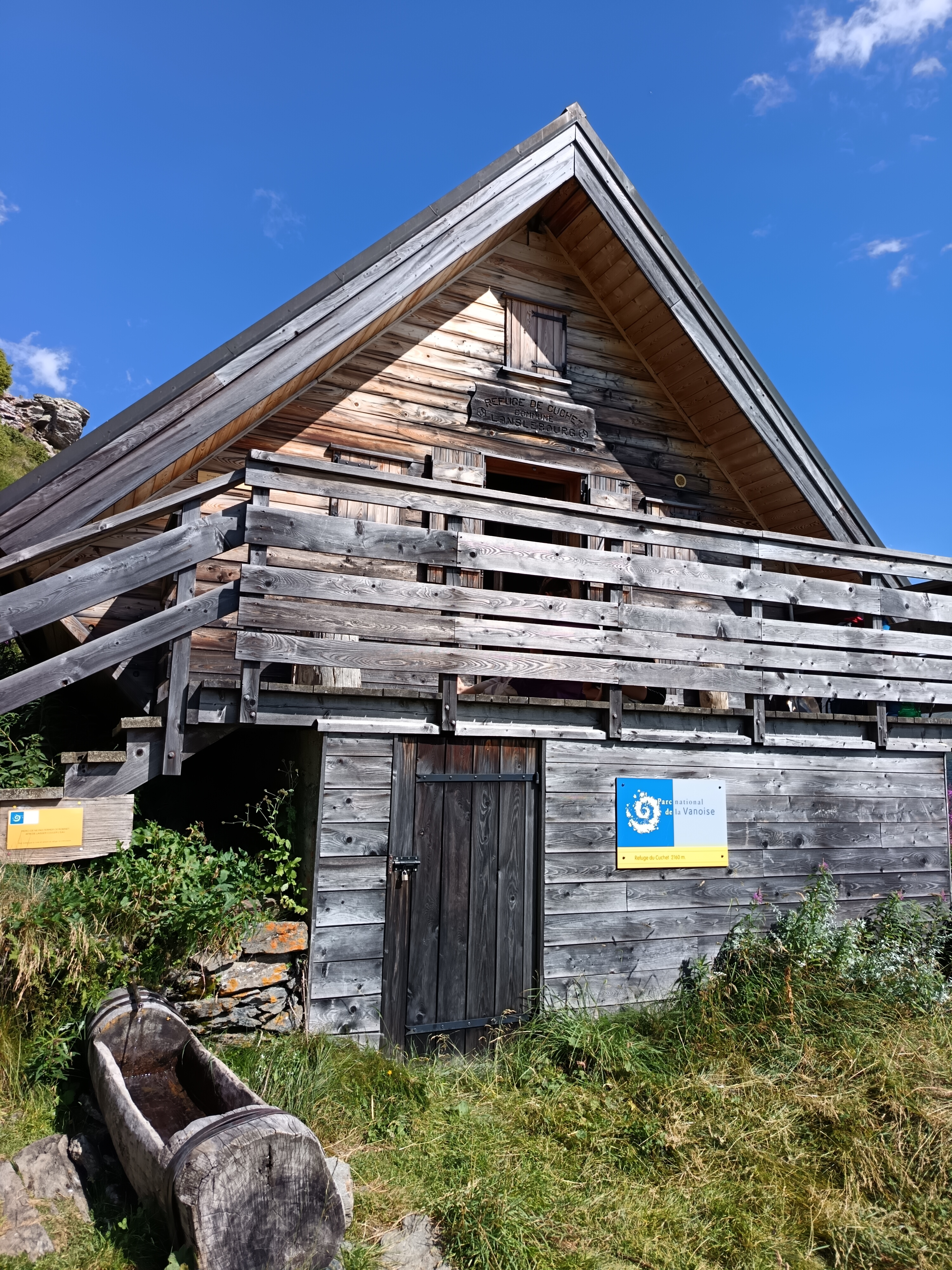
Refuge du Cuchet

Refuge du Cuchet is a French refuge in the Alps located in Vanoise National Park, Savoie.
