= Couvercle Hut =

Refuge in the Alps

Coordinates: 45°54′36″N 6°57′56″E

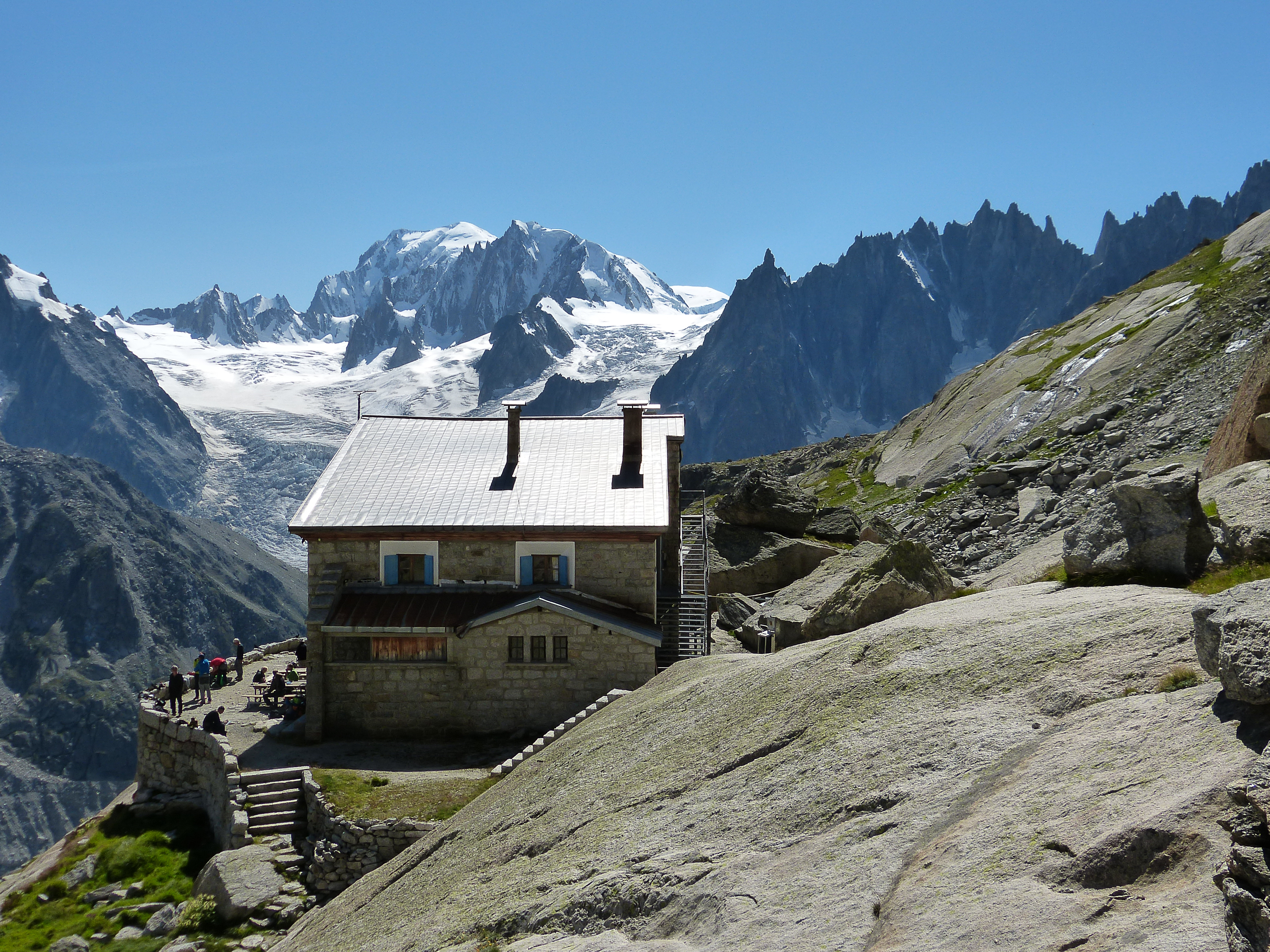

Refuge du Couvercle is a refuge in the Alps, in the commune of Chamonix, France. It lies at an altitude of 2,687 metres (8,816 ft) and can accommodate 64 people.
