= Refuge de la Dent Parrachée =

Coordinates: 45°16′11″N 6°43′08″E

Refuge de la Dent Parrachée is a refuge of Savoie, France. It lies in the Massif de la Vanoise range. It has an altitude of 2,511 metres (8,238 ft) above sea level.
