= Refuge de la Dent d'Oche =

Refuge in the Alps

Coordinates: 46°21′07″N 6°43′34″E

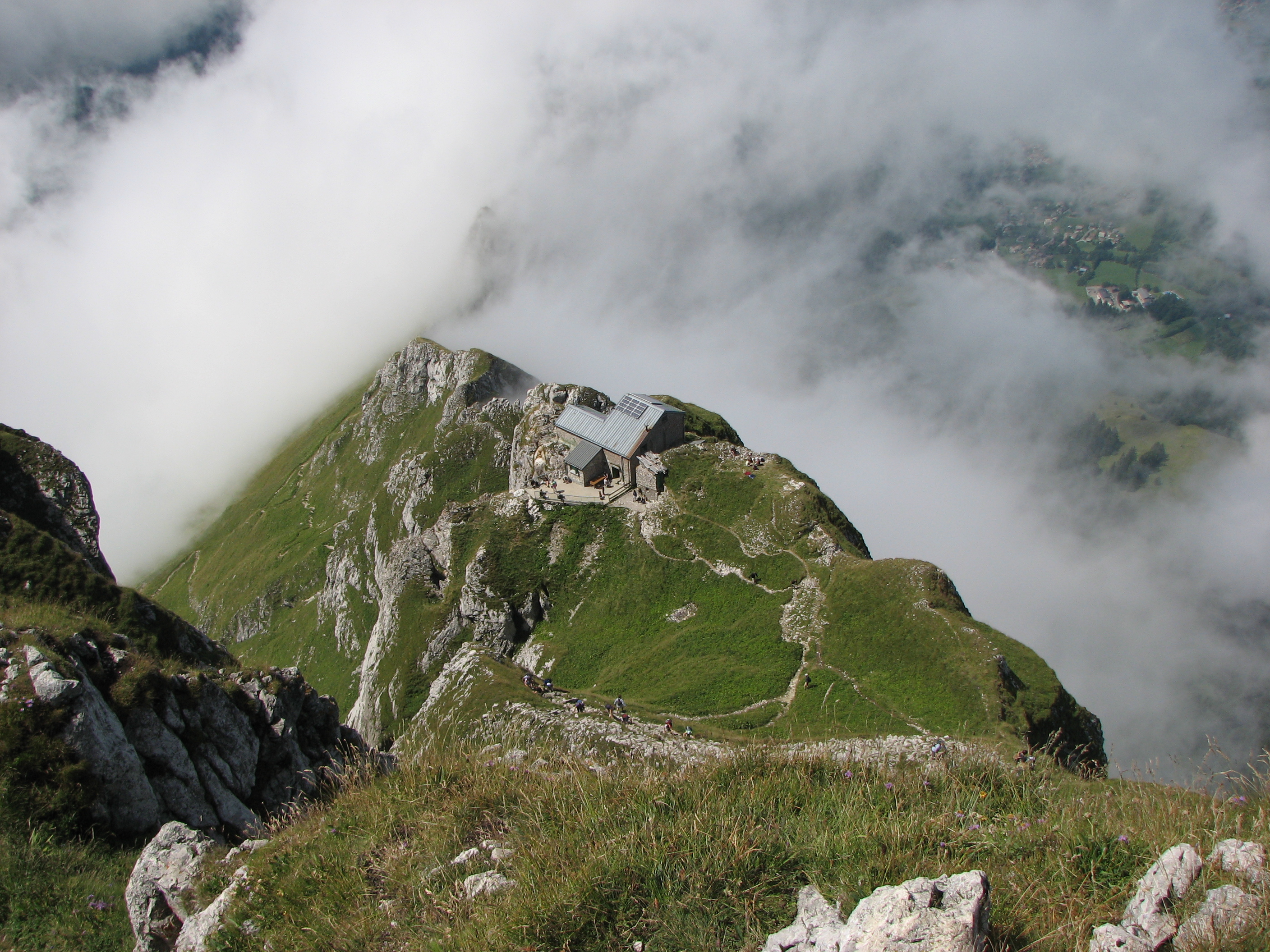
- Refuge dent d'oche.JPG

General information
- Type: Mountain hut
- Country: France

Refuge de la Dent d'Oche is a refuge in the French Alps.
