= Refuge du Saut =

Coordinates: 45°20′13″N 6°37′56″E

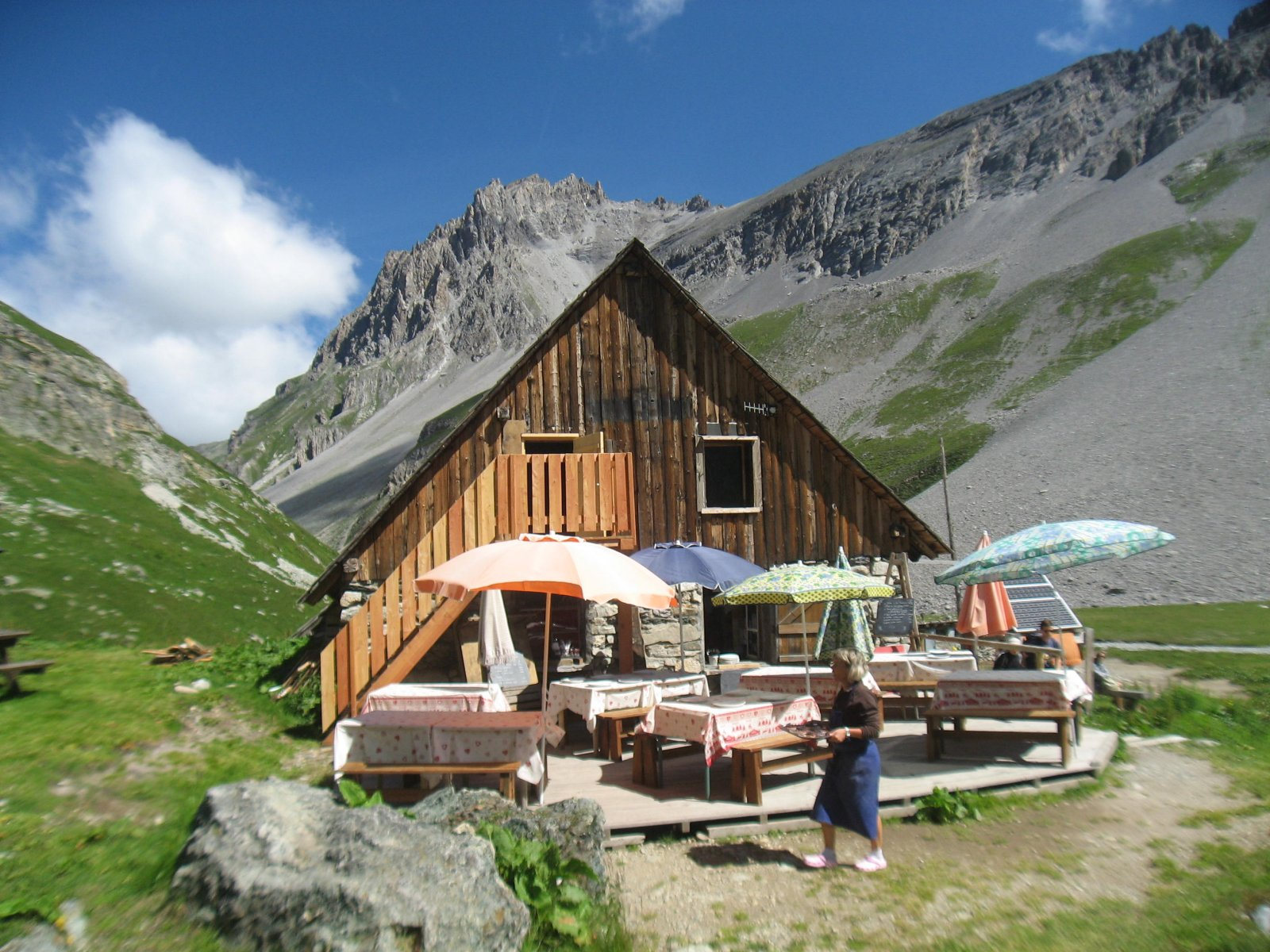
Refuge du Saut

Refuge du Saut is a refuge of Savoie, France. It lies in the Massif de la Vanoise range, between Les Menuires and the La Masse peak. It is on the Lou skiing itineraire.
