= Refuge Arbolle =

Coordinates: 45°40′05″N 7°20′45″E

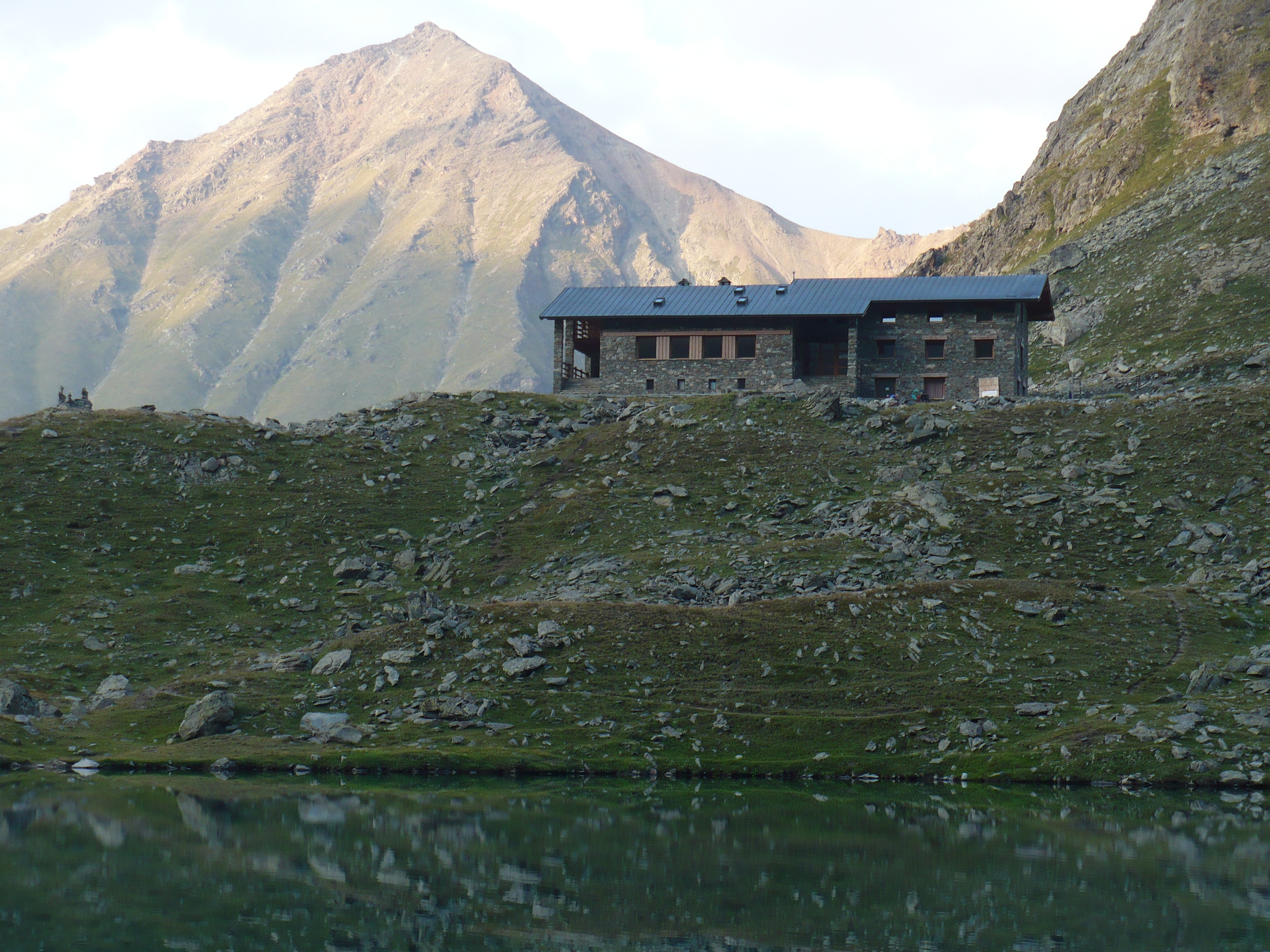
Refuge Arbolle

Refuge Arbolle is a refuge in the Alps in Aosta Valley, Italy.
