= Refuge du Grand Bec =

Coordinates: 45°24′59″N 6°44′00″E

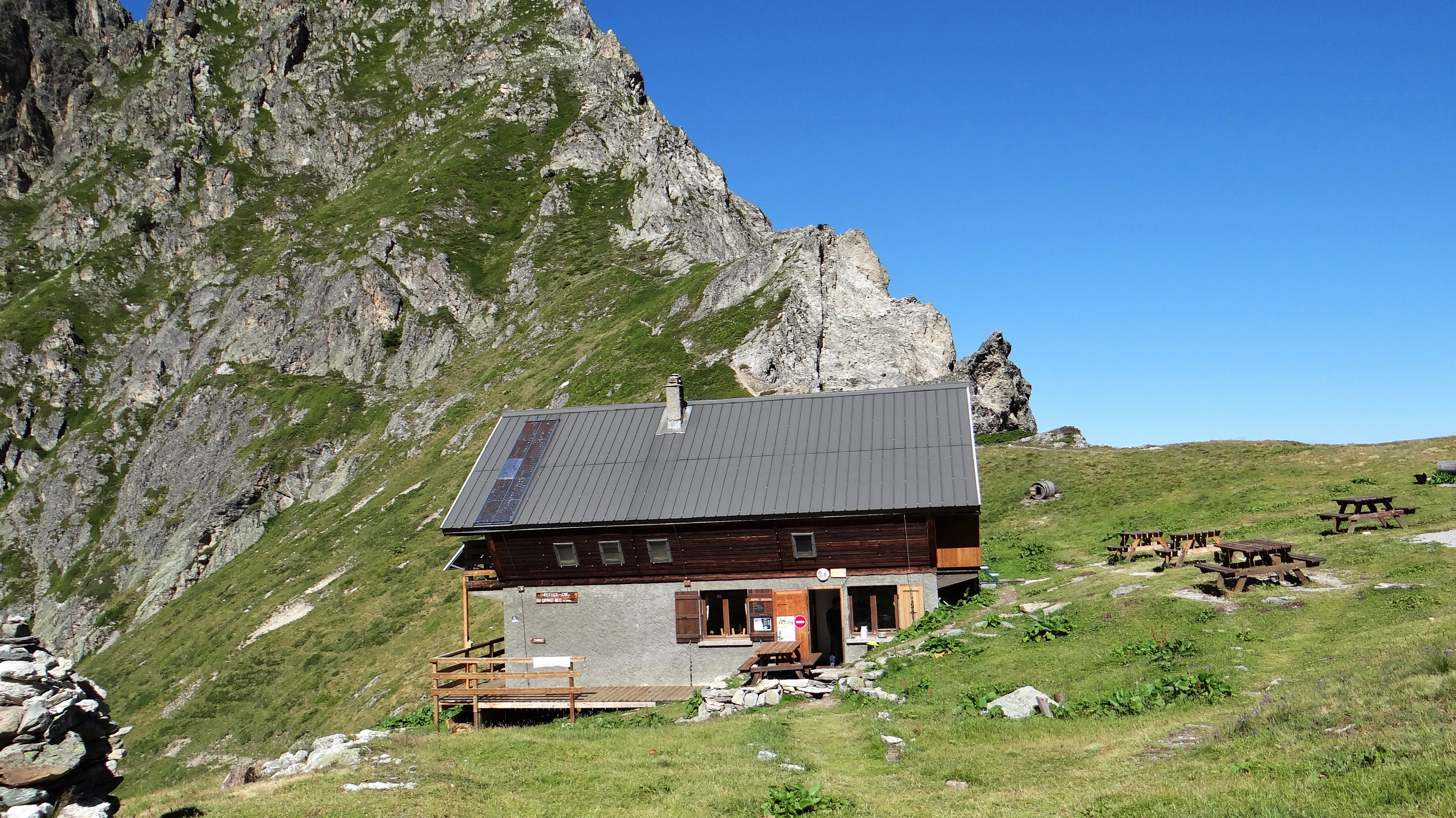
Refuge du Grand Bec, Vanoise in August 2020

Refuge du Grand Bec is a refuge in the Alps.
