= Triglav =

Mountain in northwest Slovenia; highest peak of the Julian Alps

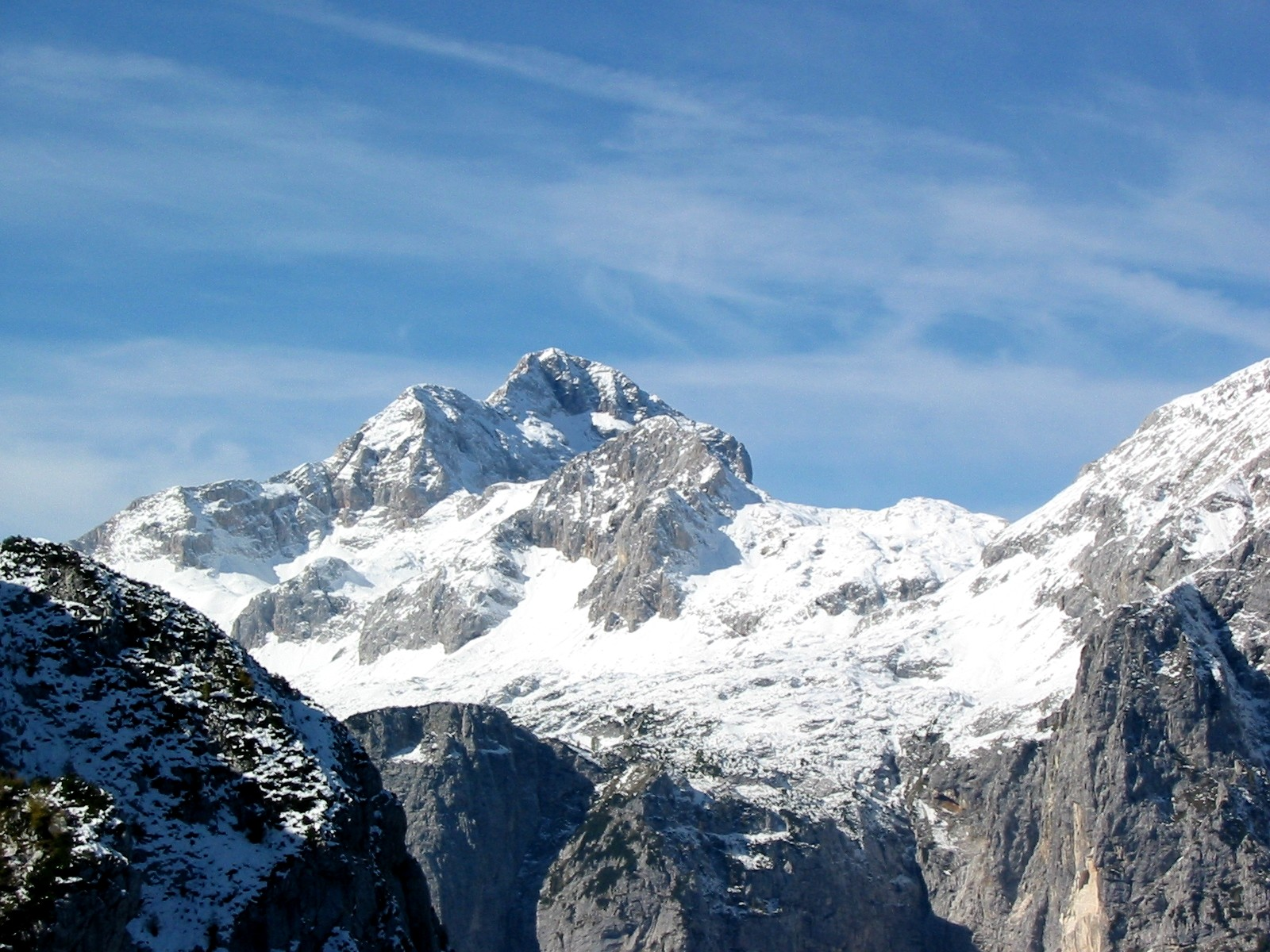
- Triglav viewed from the east

Highest point
- Elevation: 2,864 m (9,396 ft)
- Listing: Country high point Ultra
- Coordinates: 46°22′42″N 13°50′12″E

Naming
- English translation: three-headed

Geography
- Location within Slovenia Location within Alps
- Location: Littoral, Upper Carniola, Slovenia
- Parent range: Julian Alps

Climbing
- First ascent: 1778
- Easiest route: scramble / via ferrata

Triglav (pronounced [ˈtɾíːɡlaw]; German: Terglau; Italian: Tricorno), with an elevation of 2,863.65 metres (9,395 ft 2 1/8 in), (Note: According to the measurement performed in 1985 from the Trenta Valley by the Geodetic Institute of Slovenia, it had an elevation of 2,864.09 ± 0.032 metres (9,396.62 ± 0.10 ft). A new measurement by the Slovenian Surveying and Mapping Authority in 2016 showed an elevation of 2,863.65 metres (9,395.2 ft).) is the highest mountain in Slovenia and the highest peak of the Julian Alps. The mountain is the pre-eminent symbol of the Slovene nation, appearing on the coat of arms and flag of Slovenia. It is the centrepiece of Triglav National Park, Slovenia's only national park. Triglav was also the highest peak in Yugoslavia before Slovenia's independence in 1991. Other than a symbol of the nation, Triglav is a popular hiking spot, for both locals and visitors. It is said that every true Slovenian person should have stood on the peak at least once in their life.

== Name ==
Various names have been used for the mountain through history. An old map from 1567 used the Latin name Ocra mons, whereas Johann Weikhard von Valvasor called it Krma (the modern name of an Alpine valley in the vicinity) in the second half of the 17th century. According to the German mountaineer and professor Adolf Gstirner, the name Triglav first appeared in written sources as Terglau in 1452, but the original source has been lost. The next known occurrence of Terglau is cited by Gstirner and is from a court description of the border in 1573. Early forms of the name Triglav also include Terglau in 1612, Terglou in 1664 and Terklou around 1778–1789. The name is derived from the compound *Tri-golvъ (literally 'three-head'—that is, 'three peaks'), which may be understood literally because the mountain has three peaks when viewed from much of Upper Carniola. It is unlikely that the name has any connection to the Slavic deity Triglav. In the local dialect, the name is pronounced [tərˈgwɔu̯] (with a second-syllable accent, as if it was written Trglov, with the dark L experiencing vocalization) in contrast to standard Slovene [ˈtɾíːɡlaw]. The highest peak is sometimes also called Big Mount Triglav (Slovene: Veliki Triglav [ˈʋéːliki ˈtɾíːɡlaw]) to distinguish it from Little Mount Triglav (Mali Triglav [ˈmáːli ˈtɾíːɡlaw], 2,738 meters or 8,983 feet) immediately to the east.

== History ==
The first recorded ascent of Triglav was achieved in 1778, at the initiative of the industrialist and polymath Sigmund Zois. According to the most commonly cited report, published in the newspaper Illyrisches Blatt in 1821 by the historian and geographer Johann Richter, these were the surgeon Lovrenz Willomitzer (written as Willonitzer by Richter), the chamois hunter Štefan Rožič, and the miners Luka Korošec and Matevž Kos. According to a report by Belsazar Hacquet in his Oryctographia Carniolica, the ascent took place towards the end of 1778, by two chamois hunters, one of them being Luka Korošec, and one of his former students, whose name is not mentioned.

Triglav's height was first measured on 23 September 1808 by Valentin Stanič. The first to put the name of the mountain on a map, written as Mons Terglou, was Joannes Disma Floriantschitsch de Grienfeld, who in 1744 published the map Ducatus Carniolae Tabula Chorographica. The first map its name appeared on written as Triglav was Zemljovid Slovenske dežele in pokrajin (Map of the Slovene Land and Provinces) by Peter Kosler, completed from 1848 until 1852 and published in Vienna in 1861.

During World War II, Triglav symbolically captured the primary drive by the Slovene resistance to the Fascist and Nazi armies. The Slovene Partisans wore the Triglav cap from 1942 until after 1944.

Triglav was the highest peak of the now defunct Yugoslavia; it was both countries' highest and most prominent peak. The expression "from Triglav to the Vardar" (a river in southern Macedonia) was a common synecdoche for Yugoslavia, referring to two prominent features at the geographic extremes of the nation.

== Landmarks ==
=== Aljaž Tower ===
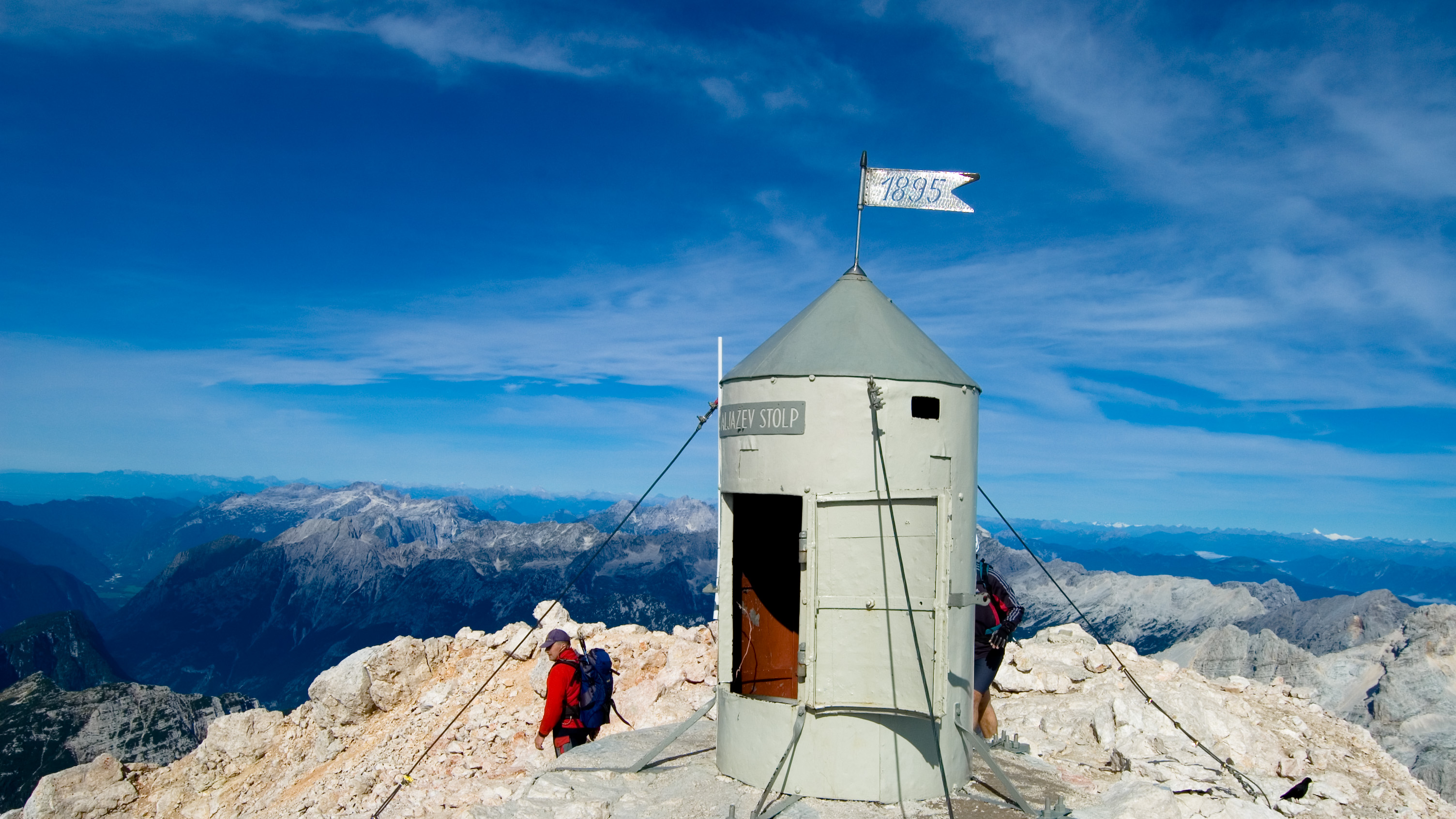
Aljaž Tower at the top of the mountain

At the top of the mountain stands a small metal structure, the Aljaž Tower (Slovene: Aljažev stolp). It acts as a storm shelter and a triangulation point. Along with Triglav, it is also a landmark of Slovenia and a symbol of the Slovenes and Slovene territorial sovereignty.

The tower's namesake was the priest, mountaineer and patriot Jakob Aljaž. In early 1895, he drew up, with a piece of chalk on the floor of his room in the parish of Dovje, plans for a cylindrical tower with a flag on its top. In April that year he purchased the summit of Triglav for the sum of one florin. Having done so, he secured himself the right to erect a building on the mountain top. The tower was constructed from iron and zinc coated sheet steel by Anton Belec from Šent Vid nad Ljubljano. He and four workers brought the parts of the tower to the summit of Triglav and put the tower together in only five hours on 7 August 1895. The opening took place that same day. Aljaž donated the shelter to the Slovene Alpine Society today Alpine Association of Slovenia.

In the beginning, there were three four-legged chairs, a summit register, a spirit stove, and the image Triglav Panorama by Marko Pernhart in the tower. It was later repainted and renovated several times by Alojz Knafelc and others. In the Communist era, as the highest point of the former Yugoslavia, it was painted red and decorated with a red star. However, it has now more or less been restored to its original appearance. The star was removed shortly before the dissolution of Yugoslavia. On the proclamation of Slovene independence in June 1991, the flag of Slovenia was raised on top of the tower.

=== Stanič Shelter ===
In 1895, due to a lack of space, Aljaž also commissioned the building of the Stanič Shelter. It is located 55 metres (180 ft) below the top of Triglav and is named after the poet and mountaineer Valentin Stanič. The shelter has dimensions of 2.4 m × 2.2 m × 2 m (7 ft 10 in × 7 ft 3 in × 6 ft 7 in) and has room for 8 people sitting or 16 standing. Originally it also had a wooden door, benches, a table, and a chair. Its significance diminished after the Kredarica Lodge was erected in 1896.

=== Triglav Glacier ===
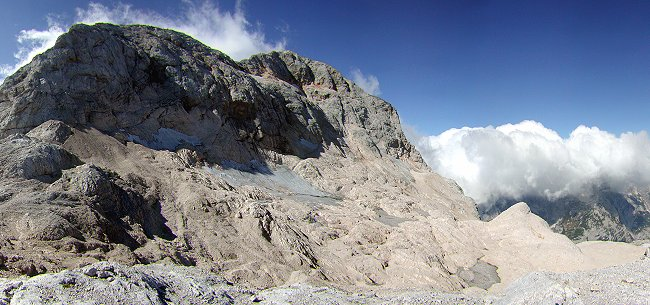
Remains of the Triglav Glacier in 2002

The Triglav Glacier (Triglavski ledenik) was located below the summit on the karstified Triglav Plateaus (Triglavski podi), part of the northeastern side of the mountain. Covering over 40 hectares (99 acres) at the end of the 19th century, the glacier had shrunk to 15 hectares (37 acres) by 1946, and after further shrinkage had fallen into two parts by 1992. By 2011 it covered an area of only 1–3 hectares, depending on the season. It was no longer considered a glacier in 2019. Its last patches of ice disappeared after the summer of 2026.

== Geology ==
Geologically Triglav is composed of a sequence of Triassic rocks arranged as a stack of thrust sheets, the uppermost of these, forming the summit of Triglav, is the Zlatna klippe, an isolated fragment of the Zlatna nappe (also referred to as the Zlatenski plošči, Slatenskem pokrovu, Slatenskem narivu or Triglavskem pokrovu). In the Triglav area the Zlatna nappe has a well preserved sub-horizontal contact with the underlying Julian nappe (Note: figure 3 provides an impressive aerial photograph of the Julian Alps on which the position of the 'Zlatna klippe' is outlined.) which is dominated by a thick succession of more than 1000m of limestones including a cyclic sequence of Dachstein Limestone of Norian to Rhaetian age.

In the upper Vrata Valley, near Kozja Dnina about 2km NNE of Triglav's summit, a sequence of pelagic limestones of Carnian age is exposed. This has been known to paleontologists from the beginning of the 20th century and has produced a variety of excellently preserved fossils which include bivalves, brachiopods, echinoids, crinoids, asteroids, ammonites, belemnites, scleractinian corals, shrimps, lobsters, fish and thylacocephalans.

== Cultural significance ==
=== Folk literature ===
The Triglav area is the setting of an old Slovene folk tale concerning a hunter seeking a treasure guarded by an enchanted chamois buck named Zlatorog (lit. 'Goldhorn', after its golden horns).

=== Arts ===
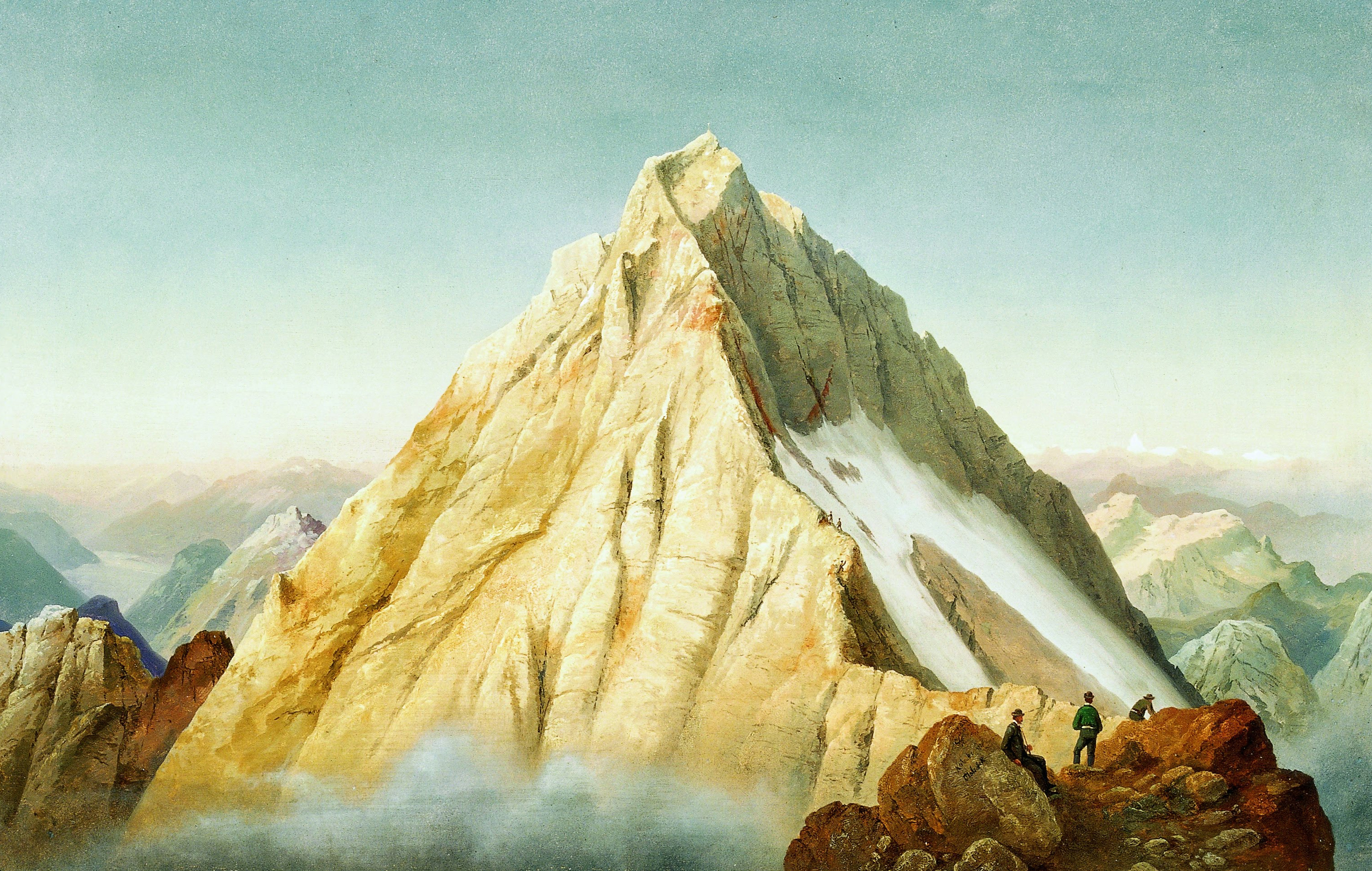
Romantic view of Triglav by the Carinthian Slovene painter Marko Pernhart

The earliest known depiction of Triglav is on the front page of the work Oryctographia Carniolica, written by Belsazar Hacquet. It was a copper engraving made in 1778 by Carl Conti after a drawing by Franz Xaver Baraga. Among later visual artists who depicted Triglav, the most well known are Anton Karinger (1829–1870) from Ljubljana, Marko Pernhart (1824–1871) from Klagenfurt, Valentin Hodnik (1896–1935) from Stara Fužina, Edo Deržaj (1904–1980) from Ljubljana, and more recently Marjan Zaletel (born 1945), living in Ljubljana.

Among the musical works related to Triglav, a special place is held for the poem "Oh, Triglav, My Home" (Oj, Triglav, moj dom). It was written in 1894 by the priest and poet Matija Zemljič and quickly became very popular among Slovene mountaineers. In 2007, its first stanza, accompanied by a melody of Jakob Aljaž, became the official anthem of the Alpine Association of Slovenia. An instrumental version of the poem, written by Bojan Adamič, is part of the start and end credits of the annual ski jumping broadcasts from Planica. In 2023, the Slovenian industrial act Laibach released their rendition of the song, titled "O, Triglav, moj dom."

The first Slovene-language full-length film, recorded in 1931 by Janko Ravnik, was titled In the Kingdom of the Goldhorn (V kraljestvu Zlatoroga) and features an ascent by a group of students to the top of Triglav. The second Slovene full-length film, recorded the following year, was titled The Slopes of Mount Triglav (Triglavske strmine). It was directed by Ferdo Delak and was a romantic story featuring a wedding on the top of Triglav.

Since 1968, Triglav has become a theme of avant-garde artists. The first instance was a manifestation by the art group OHO, called Mount Triglav, which took place in December 1968 at Ljubljana's Congress Square. In 2004, the group IRWIN produced a series of paintings named Like to Like/ Mount Triglav. In 2007, an artistic performance was held atop Mount Triglav by the artists Janez Janša (director), Janez Janša (visual artist) and Janez Janša (performance artist) called Mount Triglav on Mount Triglav.

=== National symbol ===
Coat of arms of Slovenia, with a stylized depiction of Triglav

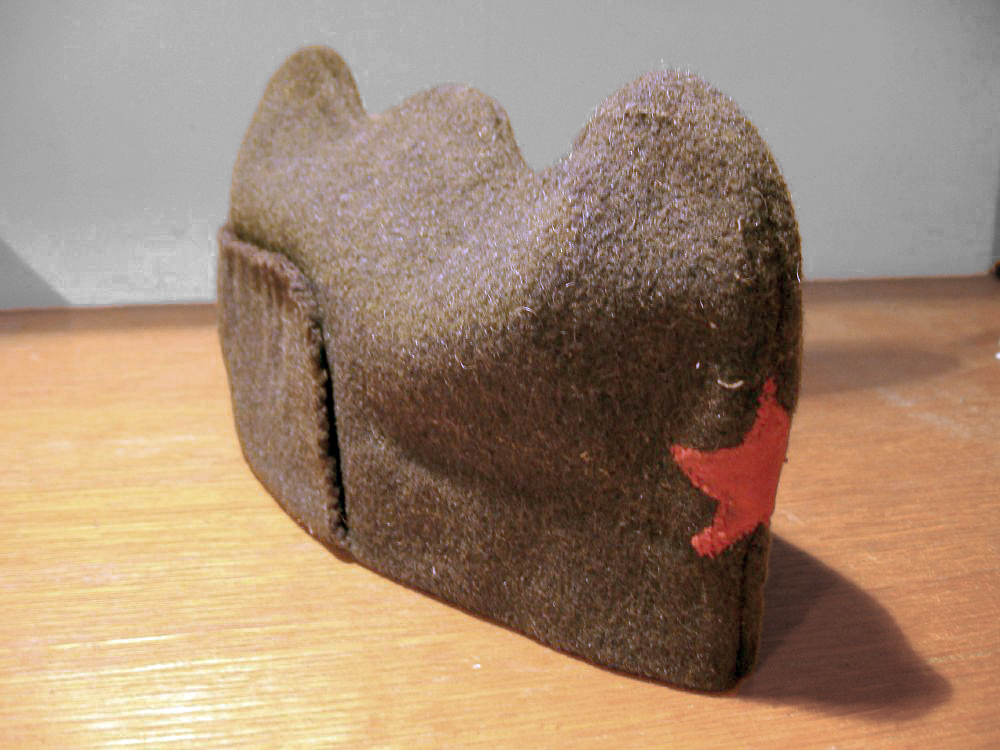
A Slovene Partisan triglavka

A stylized depiction of Triglav's distinctive shape is the central element of the Slovene coat of arms, designed by the sculptor Marko Pogačnik, and is in turn featured on the flag of Slovenia. Alongside San Marino and Slovakia, Slovenia is the only other country in Europe and one of the few in the world to feature a mountain on its coat of arms. Formerly, it was featured on the coat of arms of the Socialist Republic of Slovenia.

The first to depict Triglav as the symbol of the Slovenes was the architect Jože Plečnik, who in 1934 put it besides other coats-of-arms of the nations of the Kingdom of Yugoslavia on the coat of the statue of the Mother of God in front of the parish church in Bled.

During World War II, the stylised Triglav was the symbol of the Liberation Front of the Slovene Nation resistance movement. The distinctive three-pronged caps worn by Slovene Partisans during World War II were known as triglavkas.

A relief map of the mountain is the design on the national side of the Slovene 50 eurocent coin.

The former Slovene president Milan Kučan once proclaimed that it is a duty of every Slovenian person to climb Triglav at least once in their lifetime.

== See also ==
- Triglav Lakes Valley

== Bibliography ==
- Poljak, Željko (February 1959). "Triglav". Kazalo za "Hrvatski planinar" i "Naše planine" 1898—1958 (PDF) (in Croatian). Vol. XI. pp. 27–28. ISSN 0354-0650.
