= Janez Janša (disambiguation) =

Janez Janša (born 1958) is a Slovenian politician.

Janez Janša may also refer to:

- Janez Janša (director) (born 1964), Slovenian author, director and performer
- Janez Janša (performance artist) (born 1970), Slovenian conceptual artist, performer and producer
- Janez Janša (visual artist) (born 1973), Slovenian visual artist
