= Rastoke =

- Settlement
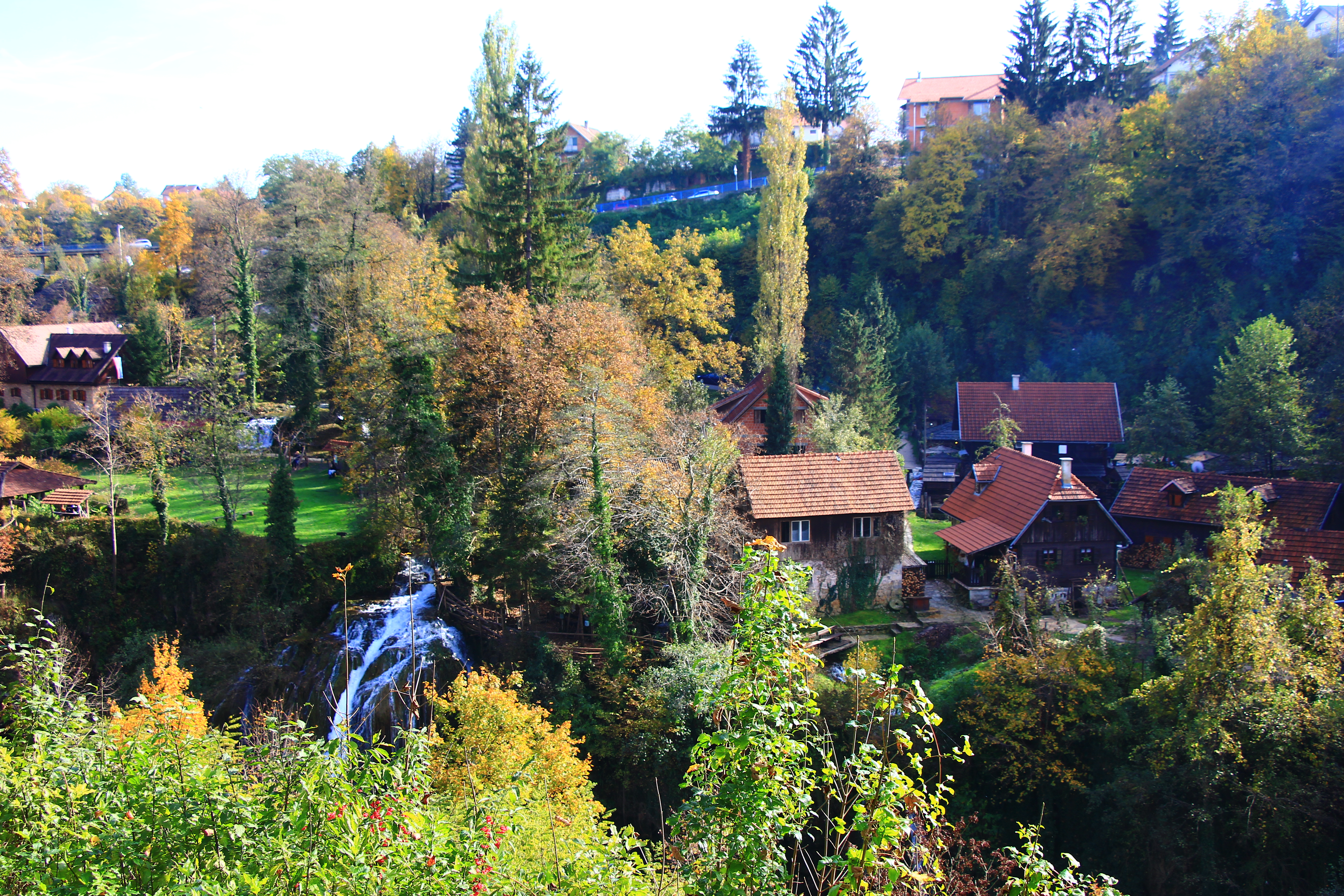
- View of Rastoke

- Location within Croatia
- Coordinates: 45°07′16.55″N 15°35′15.52″E
- Country: Croatia
- County: Karlovac County
- Municipality: Slunj

Government
  - Mayor: Ivan Bogović (HDZ)

Area
  - Total: 0.1 km^{2} (0.039 sq mi)

Population (2021)
  - Total: 46
  - Density: 460/km^{2} (1,200/sq mi)
- Time zone: UTC+1 (CET)
  - Summer (DST): UTC+2 (CEST)
- Postal code: 47240
- Area code: 047
- Website: slunj.hr

Rastoke (Croatian pronunciation: [rastoke]) is a village, located in the Town of Slunj, known for the Slunjčica River, which flows into the Korana River at Rastoke.

At Rastoke, similar natural phenomena are occurring as at the Plitvice Lakes. Rastoke is sometimes known as "the Small Lakes of Plitvice", and is connected to the Plitvice Lakes by the Korana River. Rastoke is a place of autochthonous ecologic and ethnographic significance due to its symbiosis of natural and civilizational features.

The town of Slunj emerged around Rastoke and the branching of the Slunjčica and Korana rivers. The watermills erected at this place largely contributed to the economic development of Slunj as the center of the region of Kordun.

== Origin of the place name ==
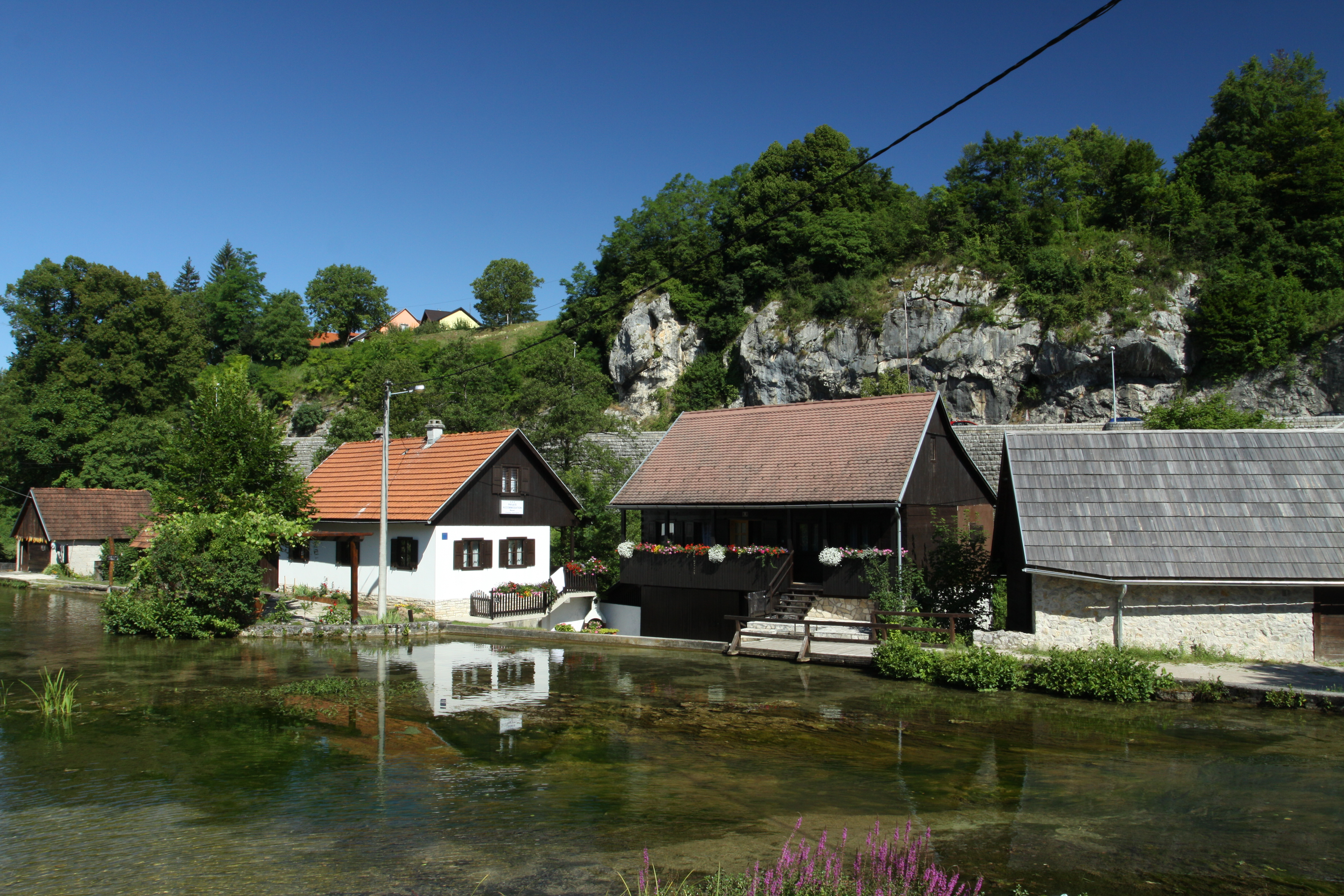
View to the historical part of Rastoke

Rastoke as a place name has different meanings. The term generally refers to the branching of rivers. At Rastoke, the Slunjčica River (also called Slušnica by local people) splits into several river branches flowing across cascades and small waterfalls into the Korana river. Rastoke also refers to a certain kind of limestone called rastopina or rastok in Croatian. This stone, called travertine or tufa (Croatian sedra), is a product of permanent natural activities created by natural dissolution and sedimentation of calcium carbonate. The flowing water dissolves limestone into calcium carbonate. These particles in turn sediment along the cascades where the water is being stirred up. The quantity of carbon dioxide in the water plays a major role in this process of sedimentation. This effect slowly but permanently creates new rock along the river's cascades.

== First mention ==
The first written document mentioning the town of Slunj was penned by Baron Johann Weikhard von Valvasor who describes the fortified town of Slunj, a bridge and a mill in 1689. The first depiction of the mills of Slunj dates back to 1789 when a copper engraving of the mills has been added to a travel report by Belsazar Hacquet, a writer of travel literature and author of the Oryctographia Carniolica (1789).

Rastoke as individual place name was first mentioned in 1860 in a travel report by Adolfo Veber Tkalčević, a priest, philologist and writer. Stjepan Širola described Rastoke as follows: "The surroundings of Slunj are downright romantic […]. They are crowned by the magnificent waterfalls of the Slunjčica River by which even not outspoken nature lovers will be captivated."

== History of Slunj ==
The waterfalls of the Slunjčica, together with the Plitvice Lakes, have not been well known for a long time due to their rather isolated position. In medieval times, the region around Slunj was known as no man's land (Latin terra nullius), an uncertain border region between Europe and the Ottoman Empire. Slunj later became a stronghold of the Military Frontier. The fortification of Slovin built by the noble Frankopan family was an esteemed secure refuge, around which the town of Slunj evolved. The fortress was destroyed in 1578 and later rebuilt. A period of increasing resettlement and economic prosperity followed the Treaty of Sistova in 1791.

Slunj was under French reign from 1809 until 1813. During this time, Croatian became the official language of the province. The house of the former governor general of the French Illyrian Provinces marshal Auguste Marmont in Slunj still exists.

With the invention of electric mills and massive emigration after the First and the Second World War, the economic significance of the mills of Rastoke dramatically declined. In 1969, Rastoke was put under national monument protection.

== The Slunjčica River and its natural phenomena ==
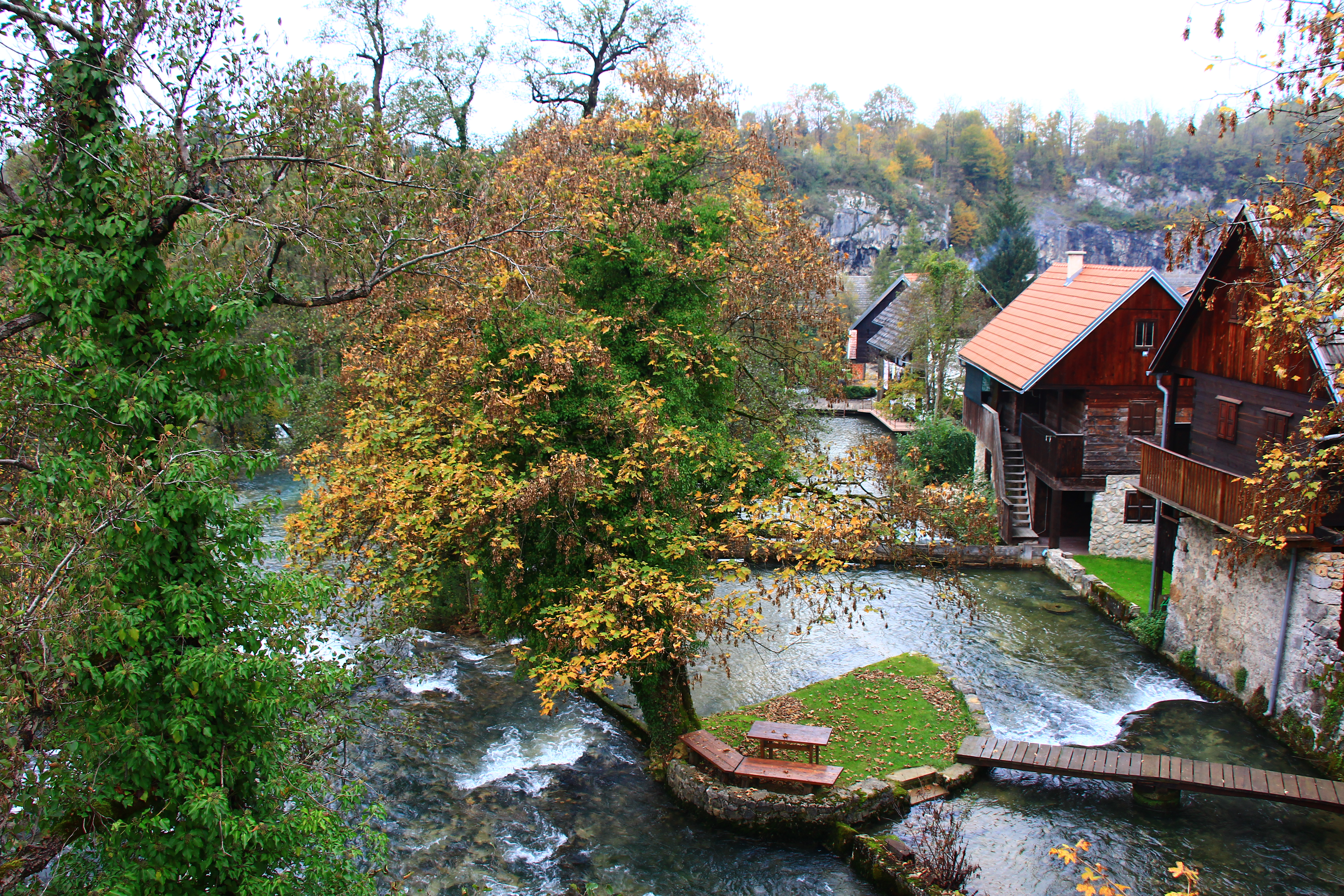
View of the settlement

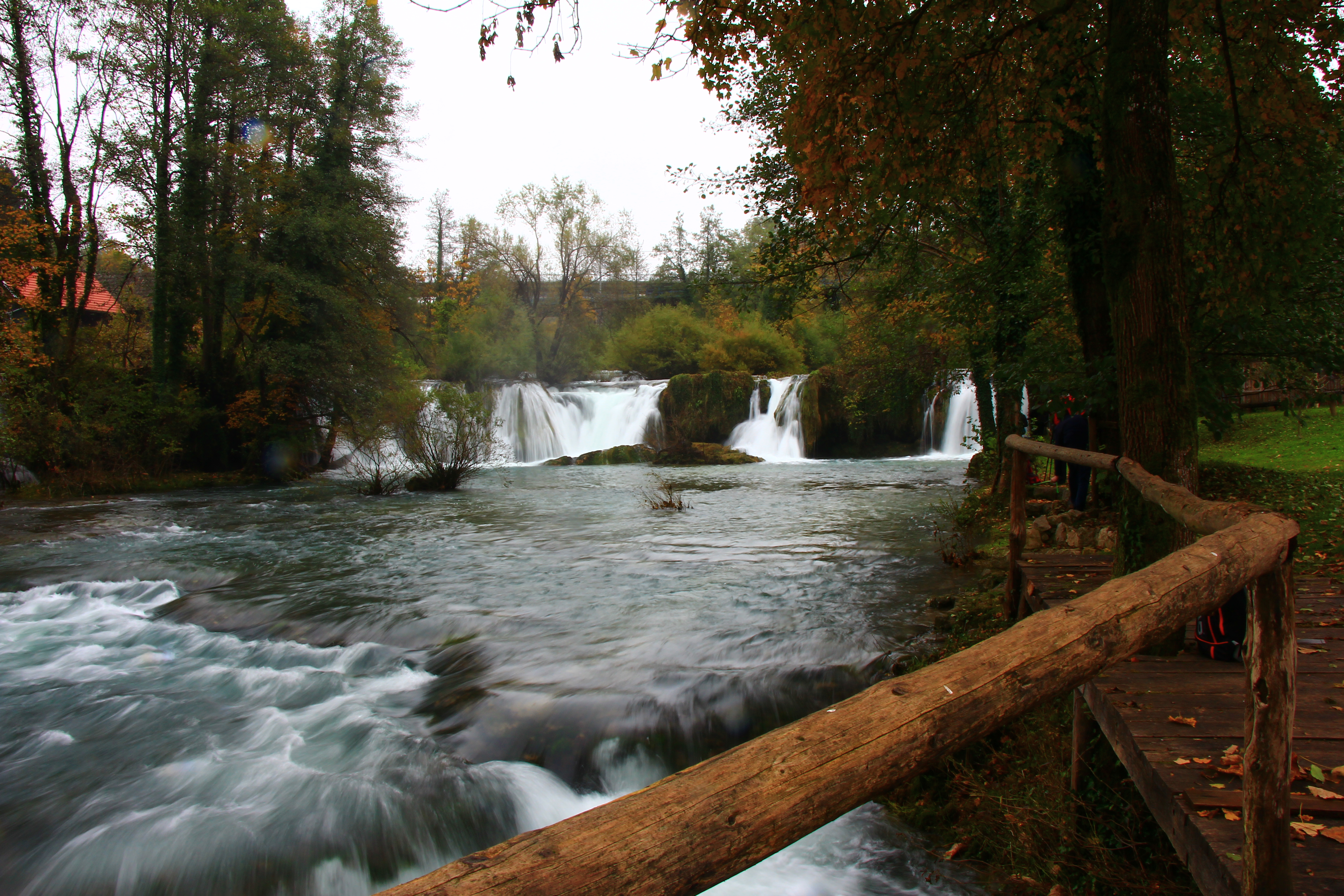
Waterfalls and cascades

In the region of Lika, within the massif of the Mala Kapela mountain range and just beneath the Veliki Javornik top, lies the source of the Jesenica River. After only six kilometers this river disappears under the surface of the earth at Lička Jasenica and continues on a subterranean track for about 20 kilometers, as many other rivers in this karst region of Croatia. The river reemerges 6.5 kilometers south of Slunj as the Slunjčica River.

At the entry of the Slunjčica into the Korana River, there exists a natural travertine barrier consisting of a large accumulated lime deposit. Rastoke and the travertine barrier itself used to be separated into the "Upper" and the "Lower Rastoke" (Croatian "Gornje i donje Rastoke"). The lower part of Rastoke consists of 23 waterfalls, which fall about 10 to 20 meters deep into the Korana. The barrier as a whole consists of various small waterfalls, rapids and basins. The most famous waterfalls are Buk (English waterfall), Hrvoje and Vilina kosa (English fairy hair).

Due to its relatively short flow on the surface the water temperature of the Slunjčica is always lower than the water temperature of the nearby Korana River. The temperature varies from 6.5 to 7 °C during winter and the maximum of 16 °C during summer. In summer, the maximum temperature of the Korana River is about 28 °C.

== The mills of Rastoke ==
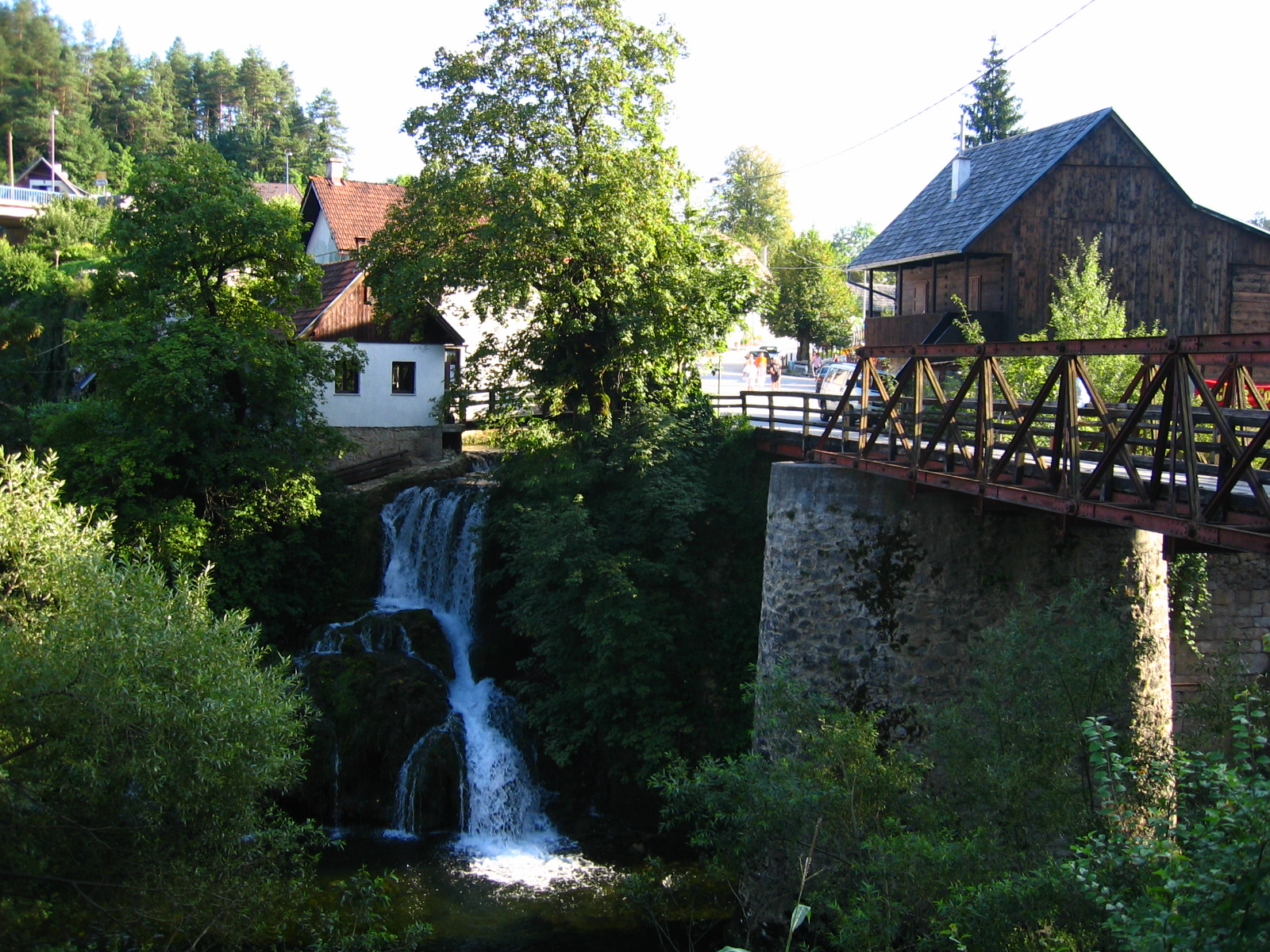
Houses at the large waterfall

Rastoke is known for its water powered mechanical mills. The architectural style of the region combines those of the Dinaric and the Posavina region. The ground parts of the houses are made out of travertine, while the higher parts consist of wood. The roofs are made by shingle or tiles. Due to high concentrations of calcium that regularly sediment at the openings between the cellar stones the ground parts have been covered by a layer of sinter. Thus, water cannot not run into the houses even at high water levels.

At its peak, Rastoke counted up to 22 mills. The first mill dates back to the 17th century. Many waterfalls carry the names of the mill owners.

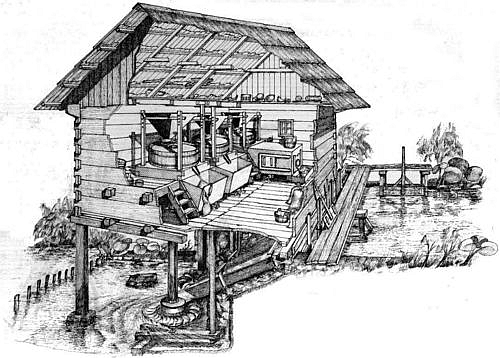
Outline of a watermill

The mills of Rastoke were driven by horizontally aligned paddle wheels. By utilizing a simple mechanism, water could be directed on to these paddle wheels whenever necessary. They in turn powered the rotating millstone. In order to accumulate enough power, a downward water fall of about three to five meters with an inclination of the wooden slope of at least 35 degrees was necessary.

Every mill had two or three, some even more millstones. Most millstones were used for grinding so called "black corn". This term then comprised the following sorts: maize, rye, barley, millet and oat. The best stones have been used for grinding so called "white corn" or wheat. The milling fees were about eight to ten percent of the delivered amount of corn.

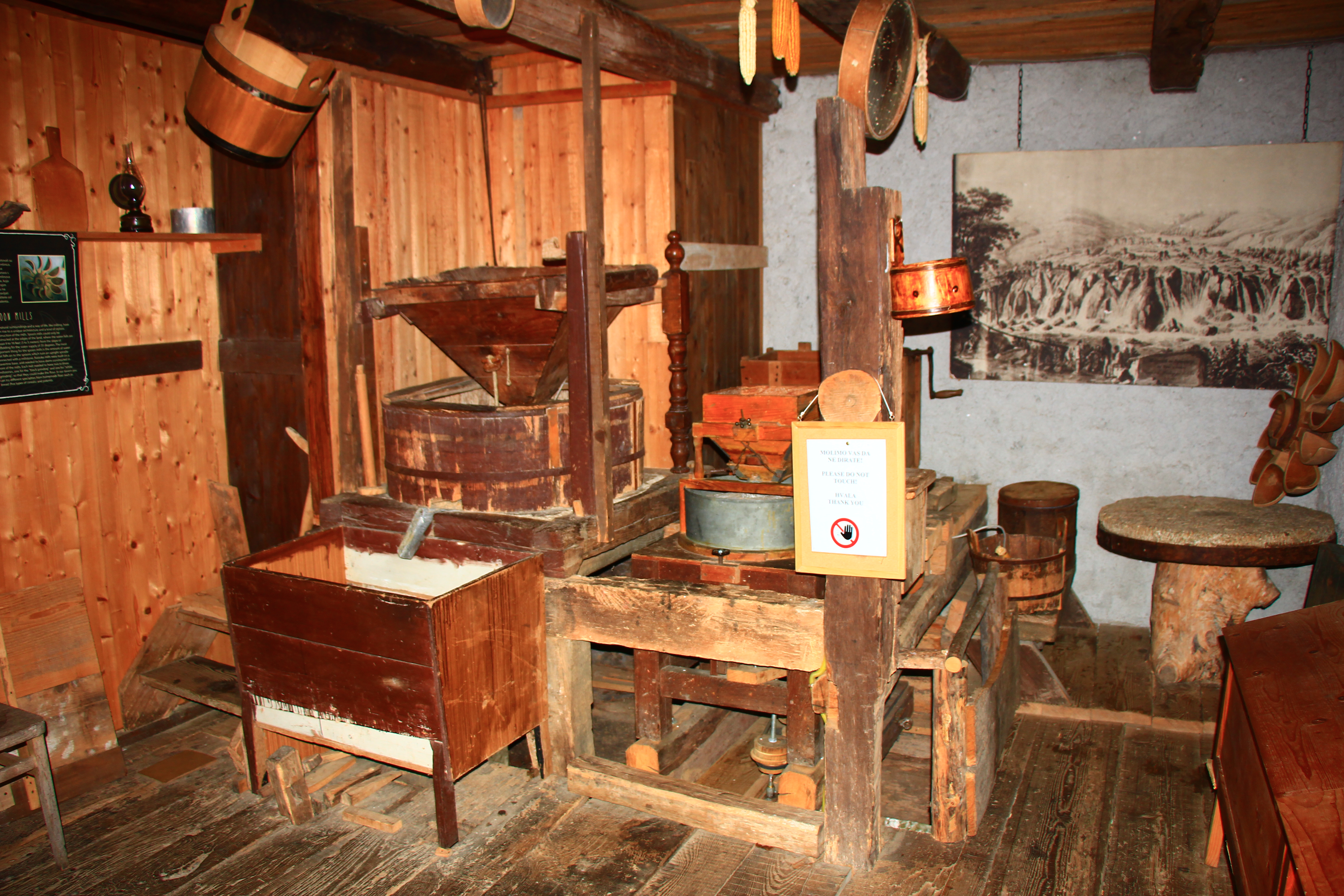
Old corn mill

Often there were attempts to conceal the quantities of corn. The millers had the difficult task of detecting this behavior. The milling profession lasted for a lifetime and was passed on in families for centuries. The abandonment of this profession only happened in cases of severe disputes and used to be regarded as a great shame.

Except for grinding, water power has also been used for the pounding or finalizing of woolen cloths. These cloths have once been regarded as most important clothing materials. In former times, at Rastoke a traditional form of washing machine has been used for washing clothes. The people of Rastoke used the same technological principle of today's washing machines: the clothes were washed in a rotating barrel with holes that was geared by the water flow.

== Traditions and cuisine ==
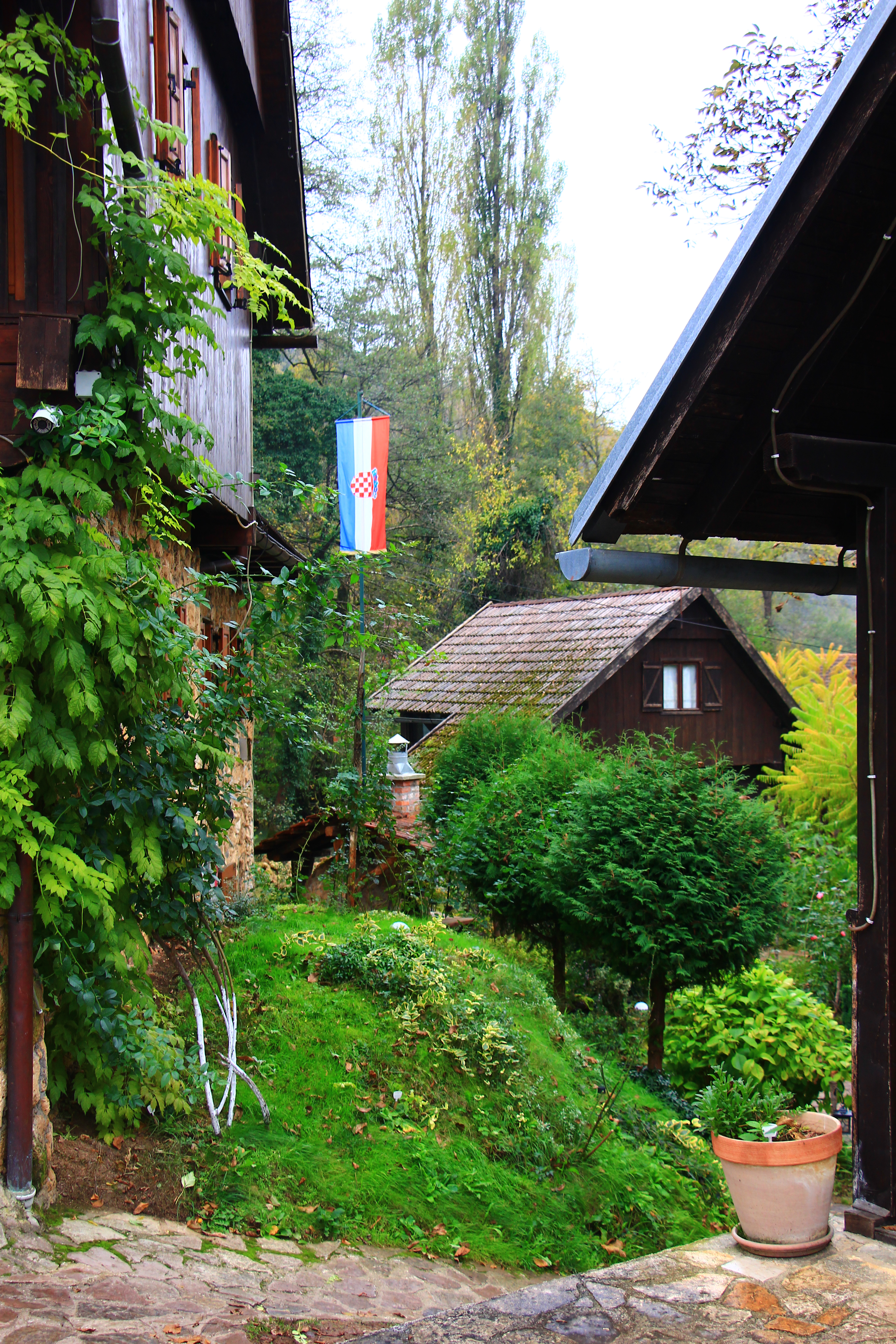
Old houses

Apart from milling, the people of Rastoke have also been known for their weaving of flax and hemp. The plants were grown by local people, soaked into the water of the Korana and then used for weaving. This was one of the main occupations of women, particularly during the cold winter months. The traditional costume of Slunj and Rastoke consists of these materials.

Rastoke follows the traditional customs of the Kordun region. For centuries, the relationship between the millers and the rest of the population, the grinding technique, the treatment of herbal textiles and wool, the customs, the language, the traditional dress, and much more had its impact on the living conditions of the citizens of Slunj and its surroundings.

The bread from Rastoke (Croatian rastočki domaći kruh) was well known in Croatia. It was made out of freshly ground grain, a combination of wheat, maize, barley, rye, and millet. This mixture was kneaded using the water of the Slunjčica and homemade yeast.

== Changing events ==
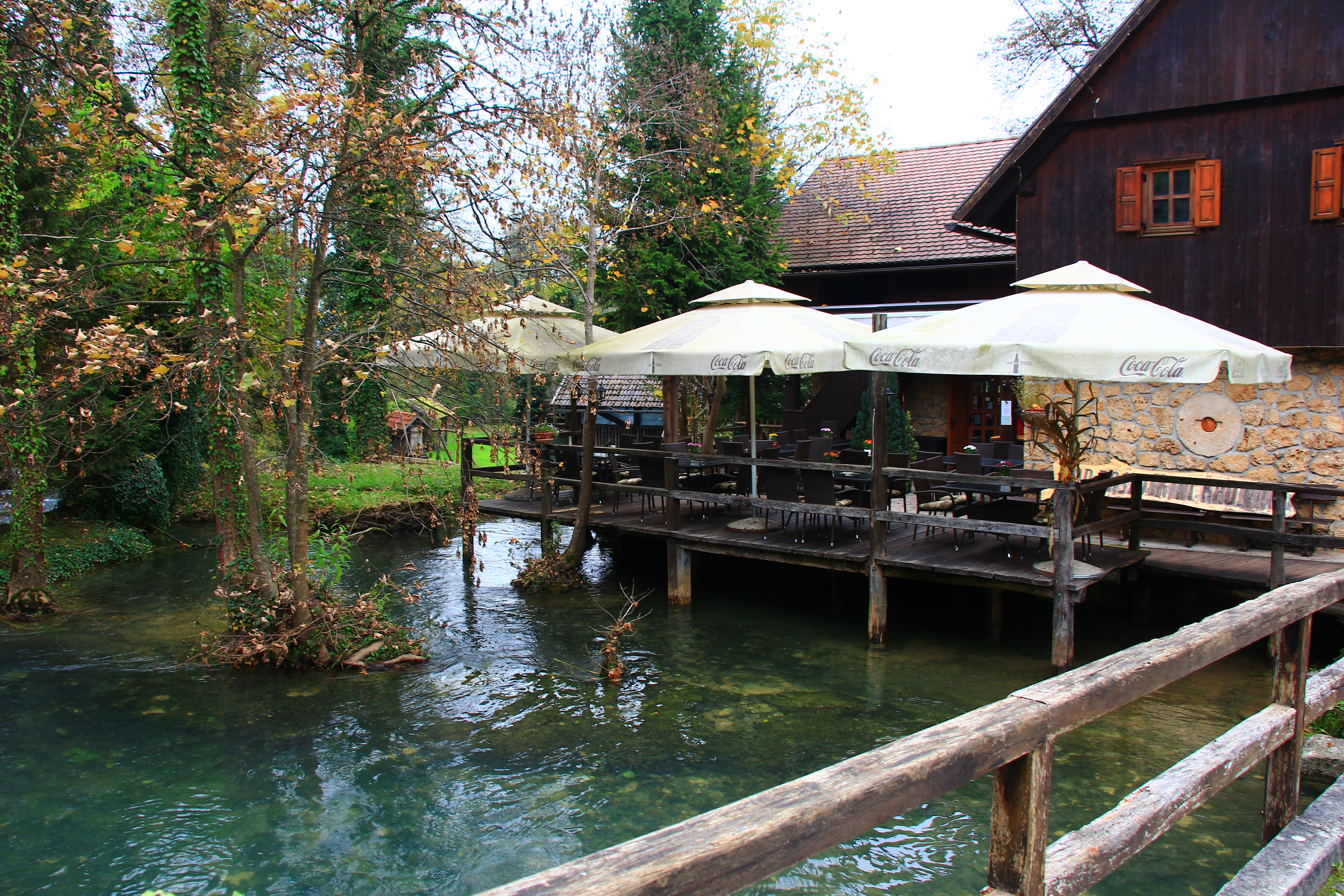
A restaurant in Rastoke

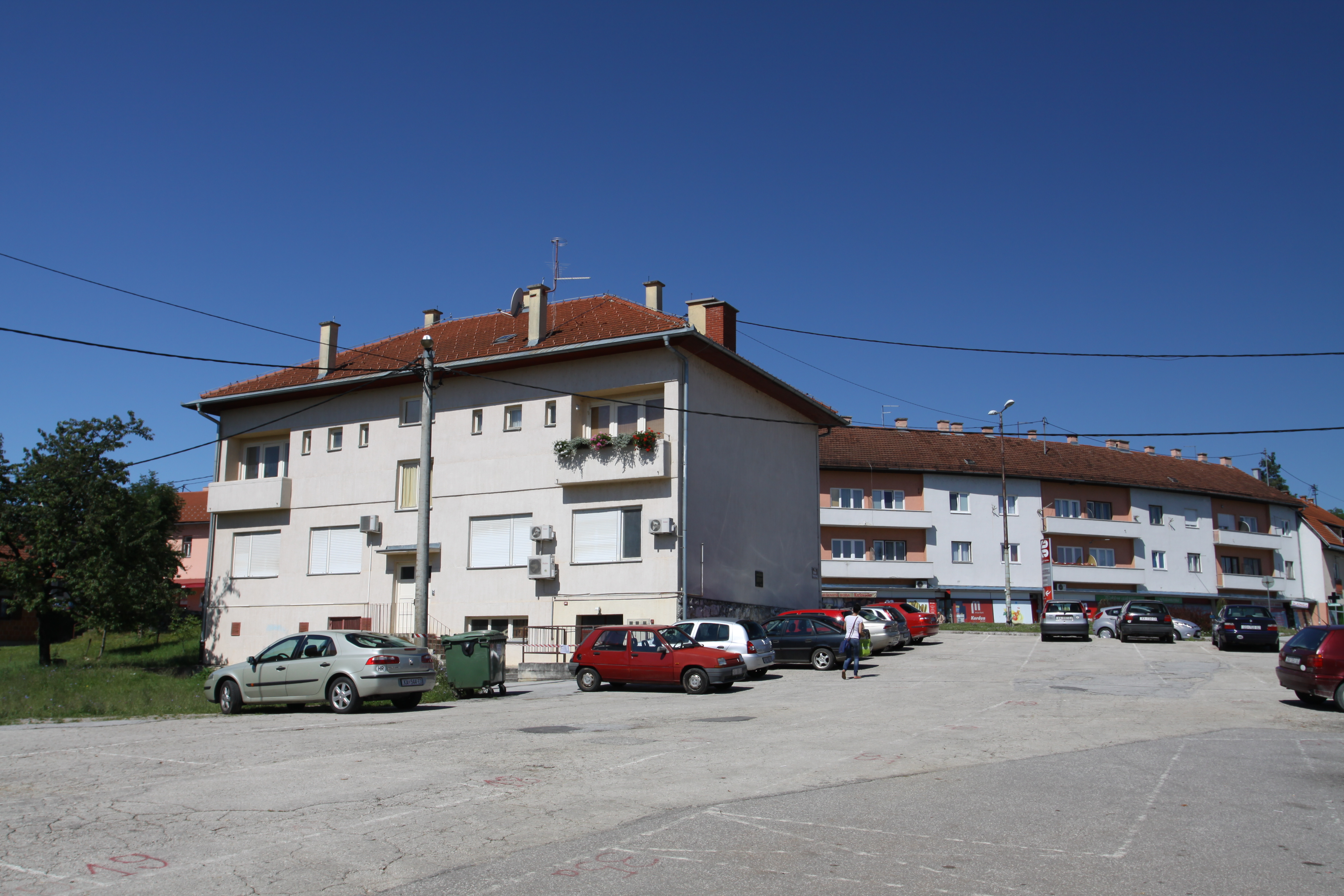
Modern part of Rastoke

During the night from 6 to 7 March 1914 a huge slide of the travertine barrier occurred due to the undercutting by the Korana River. This changed the flows of the waterfalls Hrvoje and Vilina kosa.

In 1962, Rastoke has been put under protection by the Croatian Institute for Conservation. In 1969, it was put under national monument protection due to its constructional, historic and ethnographic heritage (Registar nepokretnih spomenika kulture pri Regionalnom zavodu za zaštitu spomenika kulture u Zagrebu).

During the War in Croatia from 1991 to 1995, many century-old houses were partly destroyed. Particularly the attempted blast of the giant road bridge across the Korana by Serbian paramilitary troops before fleeing town in August 1995 caused substantial damage to the roofs of the traditional houses, and very limited harm to the road bridge. Local Serb militias, who regarded Slunj as their home region, severely damaged the waterfall Buk by throwing explosives on it during the occupation. After the end of war, the houses in this historic part of Slunj have been reconstructed so that hardly any damage can be seen today.

== Tourism ==
The development of Rastoke as tourist attraction serves as a pilot project for the economic development of the town of Slunj and the surrounding region of Kordun due to being a place of autochthonous ecologic and ethnographic significance.

The region offers many activities for recreation, such as swimming, canoeing, rafting, fishing, hunting, mountain biking, hiking, riding, and spelunking. In August, the Festival of the town of Slunj takes place (Croatian Dani grada Slunja).

== Sources ==
- Meridijani magazine. Ozimec, Roman. „Kamo teku Rastoke“. Edition 9/2002, no. 67, p. 6.

== Recommended books ==
- Žalac, Toma. "Rastoke. Na slapovima Slunjčice." Regionalni zavod za zaštitu spomenika kulture, 1990 (Croatian)
