= Janša =

Janša and Jansa are West Slavic surnames derived from the diminutives of the given name Jan.

The name Janša is used in Slovenian, while Jansa is used in Czech. Notable people with the surnames include:

- Alfred Jansa (1884–1963), Austrian army officer
- Anton Janša (1734–1773), Slovenian apiculturist and painter
- František Jansa (born 1962), Czech pole vaulter
- Janez Janša (born 1958), Slovenian politician and Prime Minister
- Janez Janša (director) (born 1964), Slovenian author, director and performer
- Janez Janša (performance artist) (born 1970), Slovenian conceptual artist, performer and producer
- Janez Janša (visual artist) (born 1973), Slovenian visual artist
- Janko Janša, Slovenian cross-country skier
- Joško Janša (1900–1960), Slovenian cross-country skier
- Leopold Jansa (1795–1875), Czech violinist, composer and teacher
- Lovro Janša (1749–1812), Austrian painter and engraver
- Milan Janša (born 1965), Slovenian rower
- Miloš Janša (born 1950), Slovenian rower
- Tone Janša (born 1943), Slovenian jazz musician
- Václav Jansa (1859–1913), Czech painter and illustrator
- Vlastimil Jansa (born 1942), Czech chess player
