= Janez (given name) =

- Pronunciation: Slovene pronunciation: [ˈjaːnɛs]
- Gender: Male

Origin
- Meaning: John
- Region of origin: Slovenia

Other names
- Related names: Anže, Ján, Janež, Janša, Janž; Johannes, Johann, Johan; John

Janez is a Slovene form of the given name John.

- Janez Burger (born 1965), film director
- Janez Drnovšek (1950–2008), second president of Slovenia
- Janez Drozg (1933–2005), television director
- Janez Istenič, winemaker and footballer
- Janez Janež (1913–1990), expatriate surgeon
- Janez Janša (born 1958), fifth prime minister of Slovenia
- Janez Lapajne (born 1967), film director
- Janez Lawson (1930–1990), American chemical engineer
- Janez Lenarčič (born 1967), diplomat
- Janez Matičič (1926–2022), composer and pianist
- Janez Semrajč (born 1989), tennis player
- Janez Vajkard Valvasor (1641–1693) Slovene name of Johann Weikhard von Valvasor, scholar and polymath
