= My Name Is Janez Janša =

- Directed by: Janez Janša
- Written by: Janez Janša, Janez Janša, Janez Janša
- Starring: Dražen Dragojević
- Cinematography: Darko Herič
- Edited by: Jurij Moškon, Giusi Santoro
- Music by: Riccardo Nanni, Giancarlo Di Maria
- Production company: Aksioma – Institute for Contemporary Art
- Distributed by: Taskovski Films LTD
- Release date: April 2012
- Running time: 67 minutes
- Country: Slovenia
- Languages: English; Slovene

My Name Is Janez Janša /ˈjɑːnɪz ˈjɑːnʃə/ is a 2012 documentary film about three contemporary artists, one of them the film director, who in 2007 all changed their name to that of Janez Janša, the then Prime Minister of Slovenia.

Signified as an artistic gesture this particular name change provoked a wide range of interpretations in art circles in Slovenia and abroad as well as among journalists and the general public. From banter to conspiracy. In the documentary individuals, artists and academics from all over the world share their thoughts about the meaning and purpose of one's name from both private and public perspectives. Reasons for changing one's name are explored as the film draws references from history, popular culture and individual experiences.

In Slovenia the film has been labelled as pornographic and as degenerate art by some of the press close to the government. On the other hand, the director of Slovenian Film Centre in his analysis said that the film is not to be judged by politicians, but by film critics and the audience.
