= Aljaž =

Aljaž may refer to

- Aljaž (name)
- Aljaž Lodge in the Vrata Valley, a mountain hut in Slovenia
- Aljaž Tower in Slovenia
