= Janez =

Janez may refer to:

== People ==
- Janez (given name), a Slovene given name
- Janež, a Slovene surname

== Other ==
- Janez Detd., a Belgian rock band
- a semi-pejorative term used in the Croatian North and beyond for Slovenes
