= List of Slovenian cartographers =

A list of notable cartographers from Slovenia:

== H ==
- Ferdinand Augustin Hallerstein (1703–1774)

== K ==
- Alojz Knafelc (1859–1937)
- Peter Kosler

== P ==
- France Planina

== V ==
- Johann Weikhard von Valvasor
