= Aljaž Tower =

- Aljažev stolp
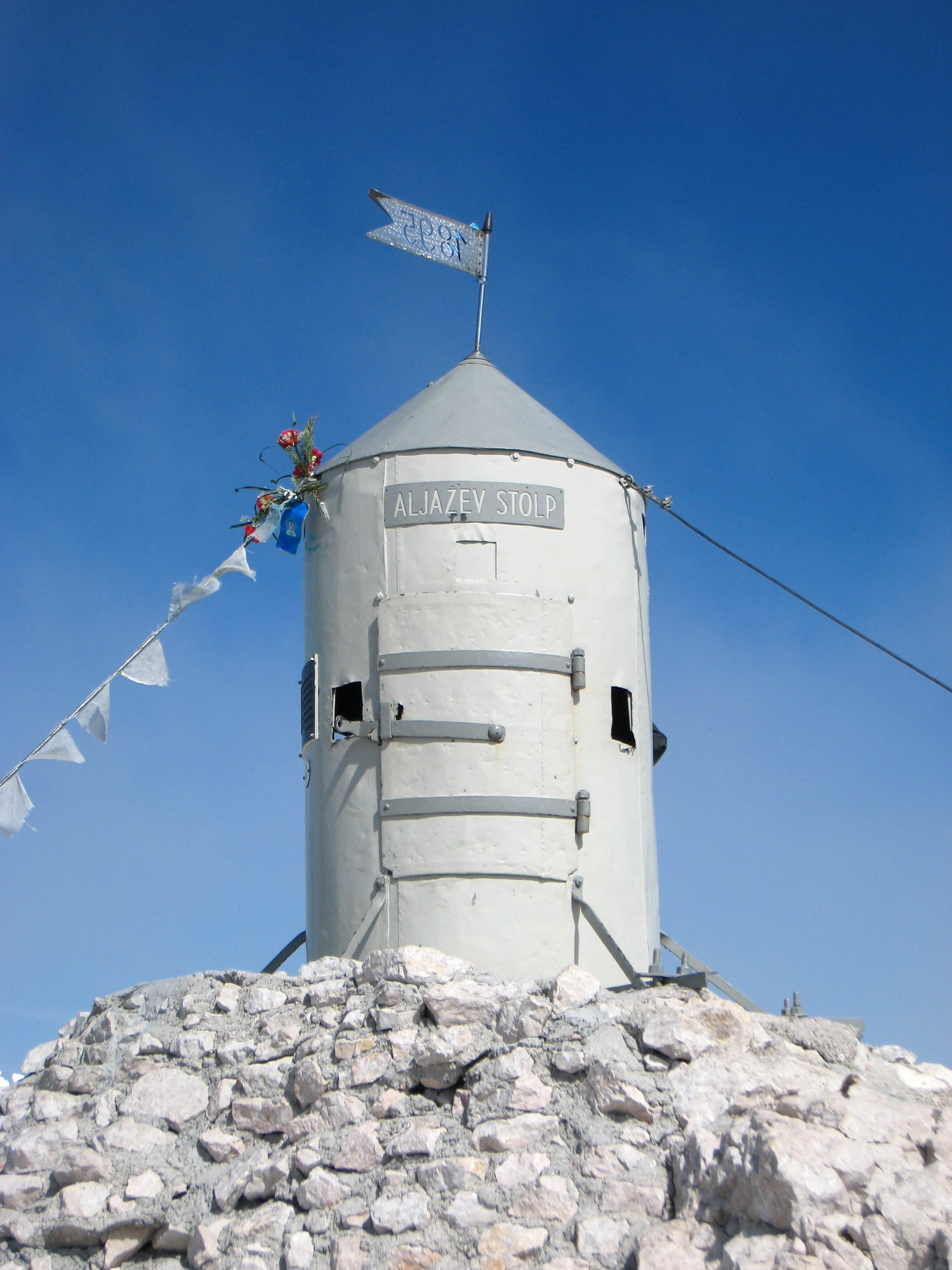
- Aljaž Tower. Two inscriptions are visible: Aljažev stolp on the tower, and 1895, the year of construction, on the flag
- Interactive map of the Aljaž Tower area

General information
- Type: storm shelter
- Location: Mount Triglav summit
- Coordinates: 46°22′42″N 13°50′11″E
- Construction started: Early 1895
- Completed: 7 August 1895
- Inaugurated: 22 August 1895
- Owner: Slovenian government
- Landlord: Ljubljana Matica Alpine Club (unofficially)

Height
- Height: 1.90 metres (6.2 ft)

Dimensions
- Diameter: 1.25 m (4.1 ft)

Technical details
- Structural system: additionally guyed tower

Design and construction
- Structural engineer: Jakob Aljaž
- Civil engineer: Anton Belec

Aljaž Tower (Slovene: Aljažev stolp) or the Triglav Tower (Triglavski stolp) is a tower, a storm shelter and a triangulation point on the summit of Mount Triglav in northwestern Slovenia. Along with Triglav, it is a landmark of Slovenia and a symbol of the Slovenehood. The tower was designed by Jakob Aljaž, a priest in the Upper Carniolan village of Dovje, who also had it erected, in 1895. Today it is owned by the state, is maintained by the Ljubljana Matica Alpine Club, and stands on a parcel belonging to the Municipality of Bohinj.

== History ==
In early 1895, hoping to be able to restrain the increased interest of foreigners in the Slovene mountains, Aljaž drew up with a chalk on the floor of his room in the Parish of Dovje plans for a cylindrical tower with a flag on its top. In April that year, he purchased the summit of Triglav for the sum of one florin from the then Municipality of Dovje. Having done so, he secured himself the right to erect a building on his own real property. The tower was constructed from iron and zinc-coated sheet steel by Anton Belec from Šentvid near Ljubljana. He and four workers brought the parts of the tower to the summit of Triglav and put the tower together in only five hours on 7 August 1895. Its opening ceremony and blessing took place in a small circle on 22 August that year.

Aljaž donated the shelter to the Alpine Association of Slovenia. In the beginning, there were three four-legged chairs, a summit register, a spirit stove, and the image The Triglav Panorama by Marko Pernhart in the tower. It was later repainted and renovated several times by Alojz Knafelc and others. In the communist era, as the highest point of the former Yugoslavia, it was painted red and decorated with a red star. However, it has more or less regained its original appearance. The star was removed shortly before the dissolution of Yugoslavia. On the proclamation of Slovene independence in June 1991, the flag of Slovenia was ceremonially raised at the tower. On 5 October 1999, the tower and its immediate surroundings were proclaimed a site of national cultural importance for Slovenia.

The tower was removed from the summit by helicopter for restoration on September 7, 2018, and put back on 3 October same year.

== Gallery ==
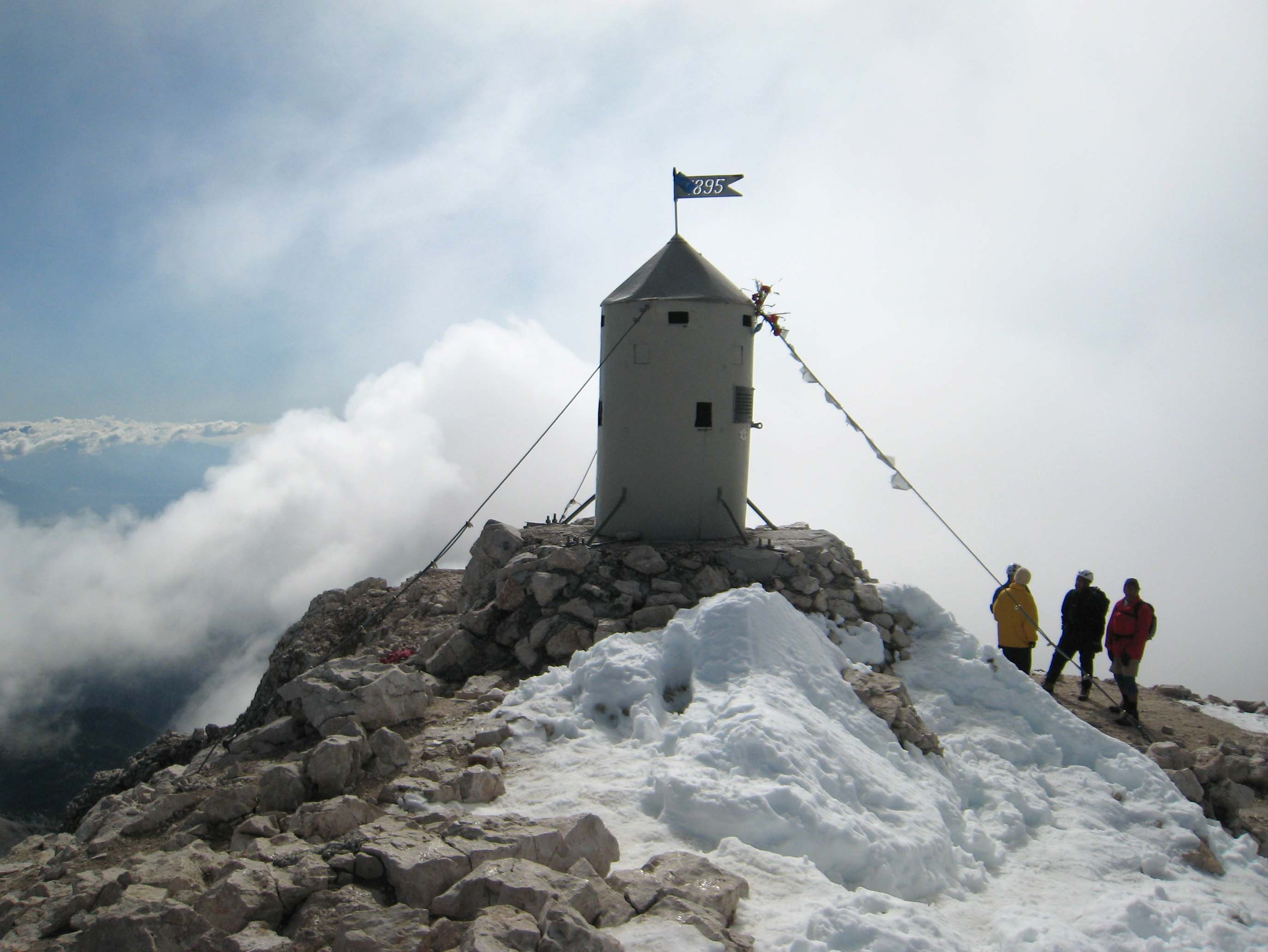
Summit view with the Aljaž Tower

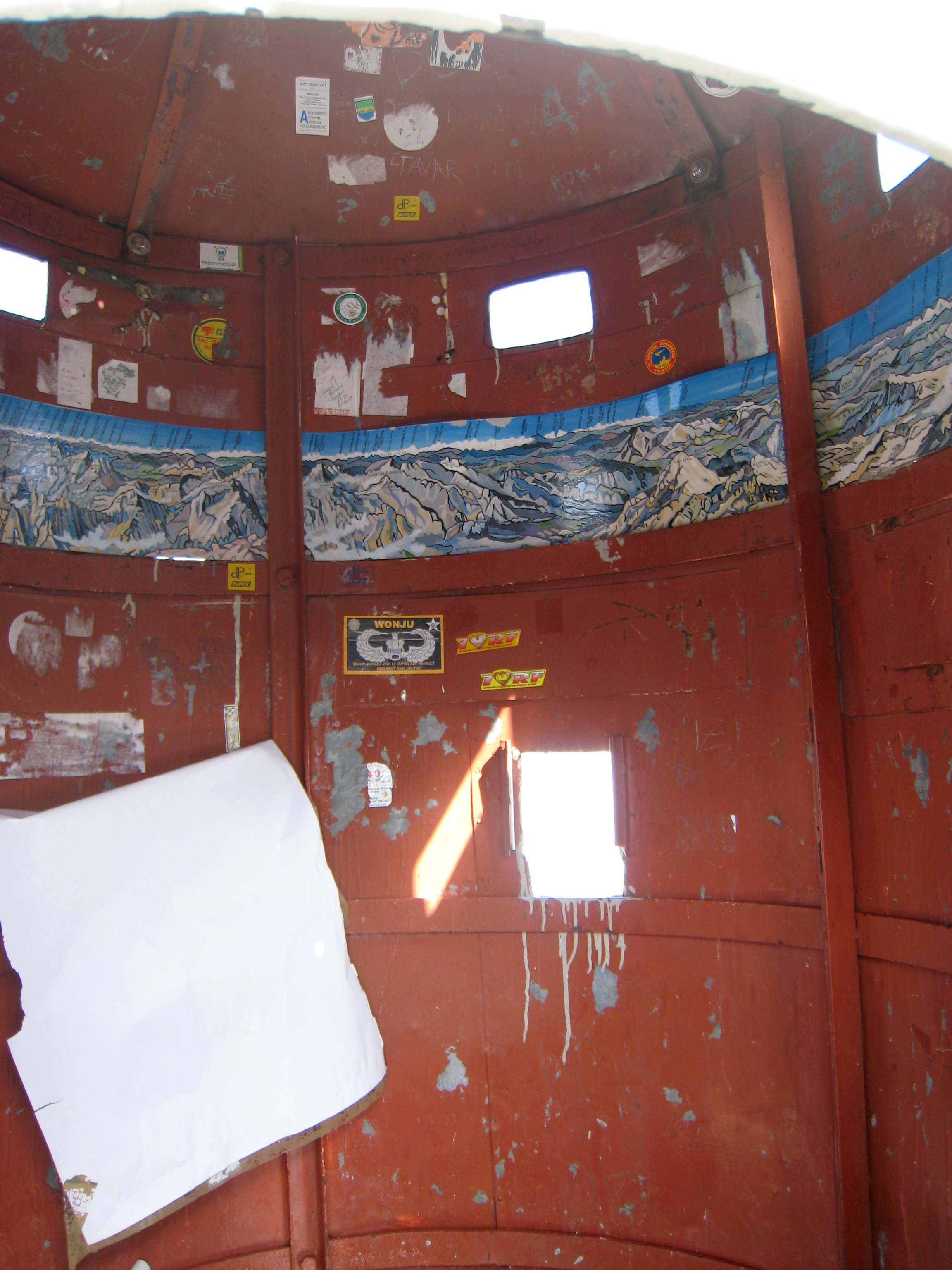
Inside the Aljaž Tower, showing its view orientation map

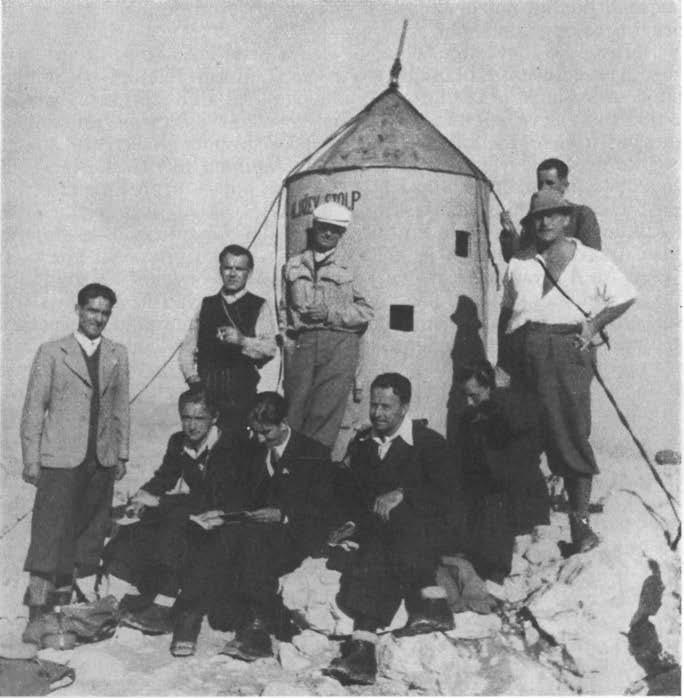
15-year-old King Peter II of Yugoslavia on top of Mount Triglav on August 12, 1939
