= Anže =

Anže was once a diminutive of the Slovene given name Janez, but today it is often an official given name. Notable people with the given name include:

- Anže Berčič (born 1990), Slovenian slalom canoeist
- Anže Jelar (born 1991), Slovenian footballer
- Anže Kopitar (born 1987), Slovenian professional ice hockey player
- Anže Košnik (born 1991), Slovenian footballer
- Anže Kuralt (born 1991), Slovenian ice hockey player
- Anže Lanišek (born 1996), Slovenian ski jumper
- Anže Semenič (born 1993), Slovenian ski jumper
- Anže Šetina (born 1986), Slovenian skeleton racer
- Anže Tavčar (born 1994), Slovenian swimmer
- Anže Zorc (born 1994), Slovenian footballer

== See also ==
- Anže, Krško
- Anze County
