= Jakob Aljaž =

Slovene Roman Catholic priest, composer and mountaineer

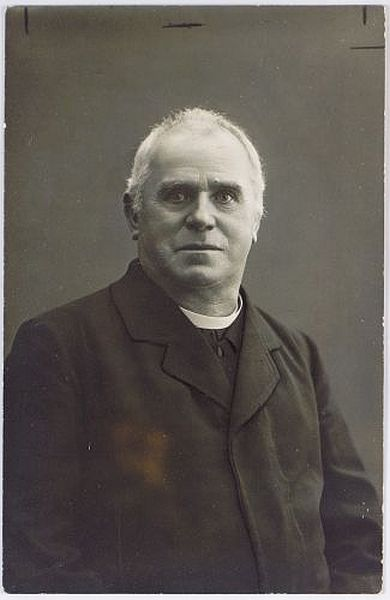
Jakob Aljaž

Jakob Aljaž (July 6, 1845 – May 4, 1927) was a Slovene Roman Catholic priest, composer and mountaineer.

Aljaž was born in a small Upper Carniolan village of Zavrh pod Šmarno Goro, northeast of Ljubljana, in what was then the Austrian Empire. He was a priest and also a successful composer, singer and choir master. His works are still very popular among Slovenes. He became known for his role fostering the development of mountaineering in the Slovene Lands. By far his most well known construction is the Aljaž Tower (Slovene: Aljažev stolp), built on the summit of Mount Triglav, the highest mountain of the Julian Alps and of Slovenia, which he purchased to secure the area for Slovene rather than German mountaineers. He also designed shelters and huts, and worked with the Slovene Mountaineering Society to improve use of the land on Triglav.

The endeavours of Jakob Aljaž had a very influential role in the emergence of Mount Triglav as one of the central symbols of the Slovene people. The first verse from the patriotic poem Oh, Triglav, My Home (Oj, Triglav, moj dom) by Matija Zemljič, put into music by Jakob Aljaž, is engraved in the Slovenian 50 cent euro coin. Since 2007, its first stance has been the anthem of the Alpine Association of Slovenia.

Jakob Aljaž died in the village of Dovje in Kingdom of Serbs, Croats and Slovenes.
