= Alojz Knafelc =

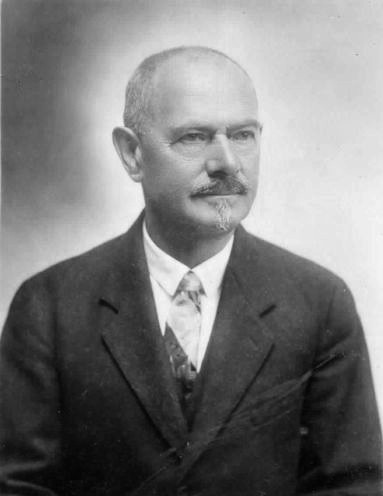
Alojz Knafelc in the 1920s

The Knafelc blaze

Alojz Knafelc (23 June 1859 – 26 April 1937) was a Slovene cartographer, mountaineer and the inventor of the Slovene trail blaze.

== Life and work ==
Knafelc was born in Šmihel pri Novem Mestu. At first he worked as a drawer for the project of constructing the railway connection between Hrpelje and Kozina. Here he had to take care of different signatures and measurement tables. Several times he recoloured the Aljaž Tower on Triglav. He also wrote the instructions on path-blazing, published in 1922 in the Alpine Gazette (Slovene: Planinski vestnik). He died in Ljubljana.

== Knafelc blaze ==
The Knafelc blaze, introduced in 1922, is a white dot inside a red ring. The outer diameter should be between 8 and 10 cm (3.1 and 3.9 in), with the inner radius about half of the outer radius. A variant with a yellow dot in the center is used for the European long-distance paths E6 and E7. A variant with a green ring around a red ring and a white dot in the center is used on the borders of the country. The Knafelc blaze (Knafelčeva markacija) was later used all over Yugoslavia and is prescribed for Slovenia by the 2007 Mountain Paths Act (Zakon o planinskih poteh).
