= Anton Karinger =

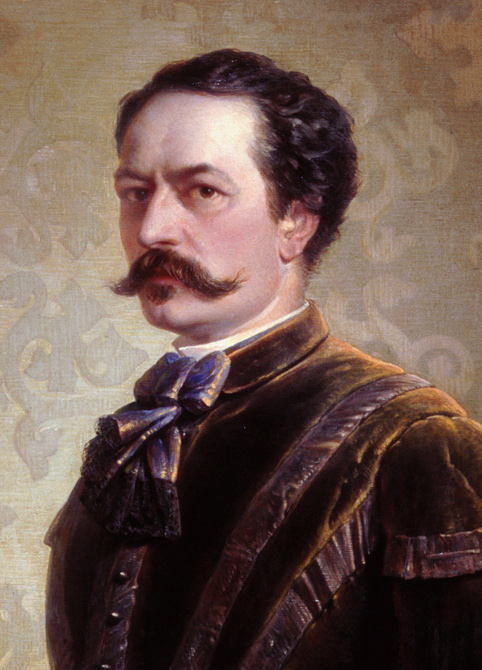
- Self-portrait
- Born: 23 October 1829; Ljubljana
- Died: 14 March 1870; Ljubljana

Anton Karinger (1829-1870) was a Slovene painter and poet.

He was a pupil of Steinfeld in Vienna and is known for landscapes and seascapes, mostly views of Carinthia and the Adriatic coast.

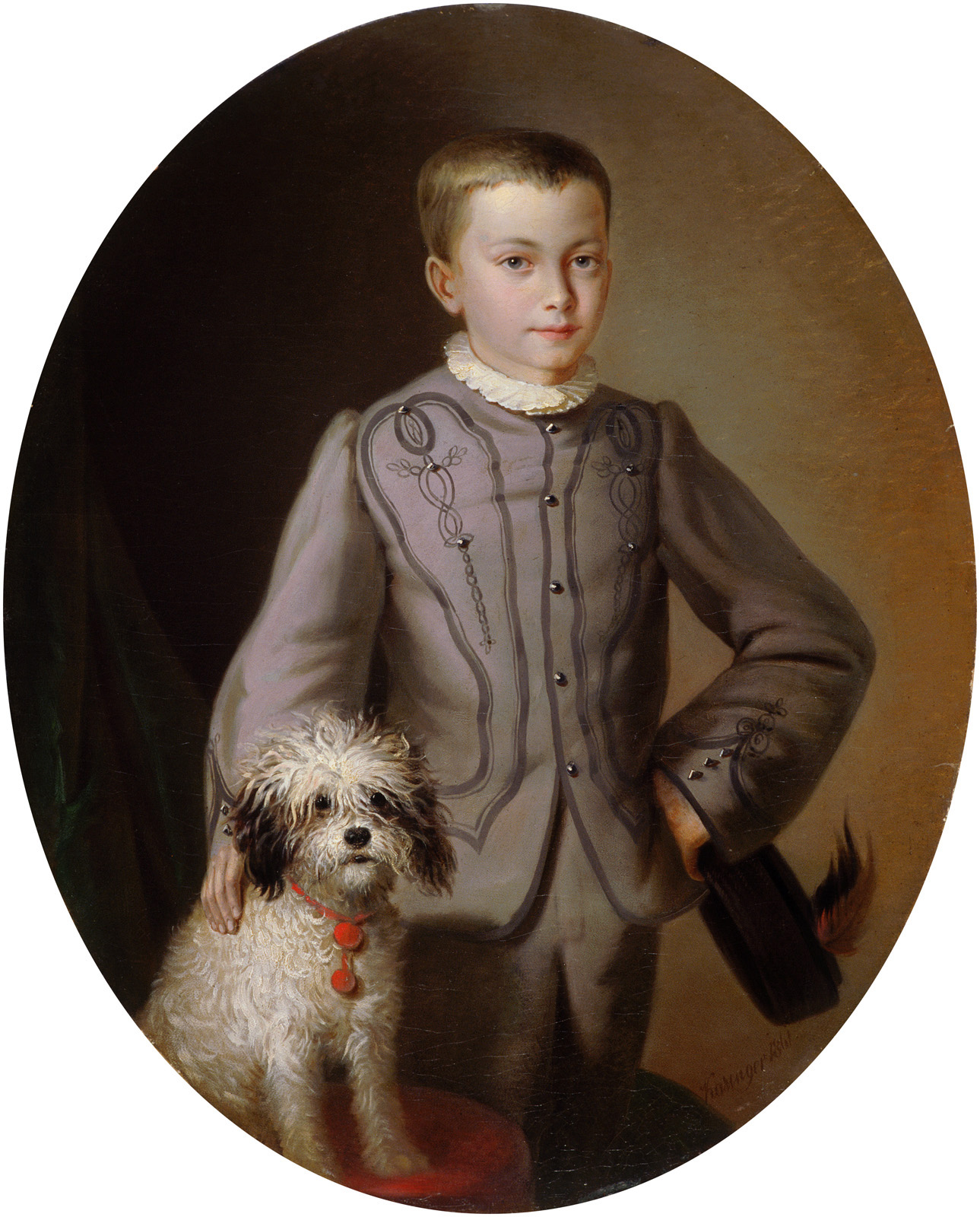
Portrait of a Boy with a Dog, 1861

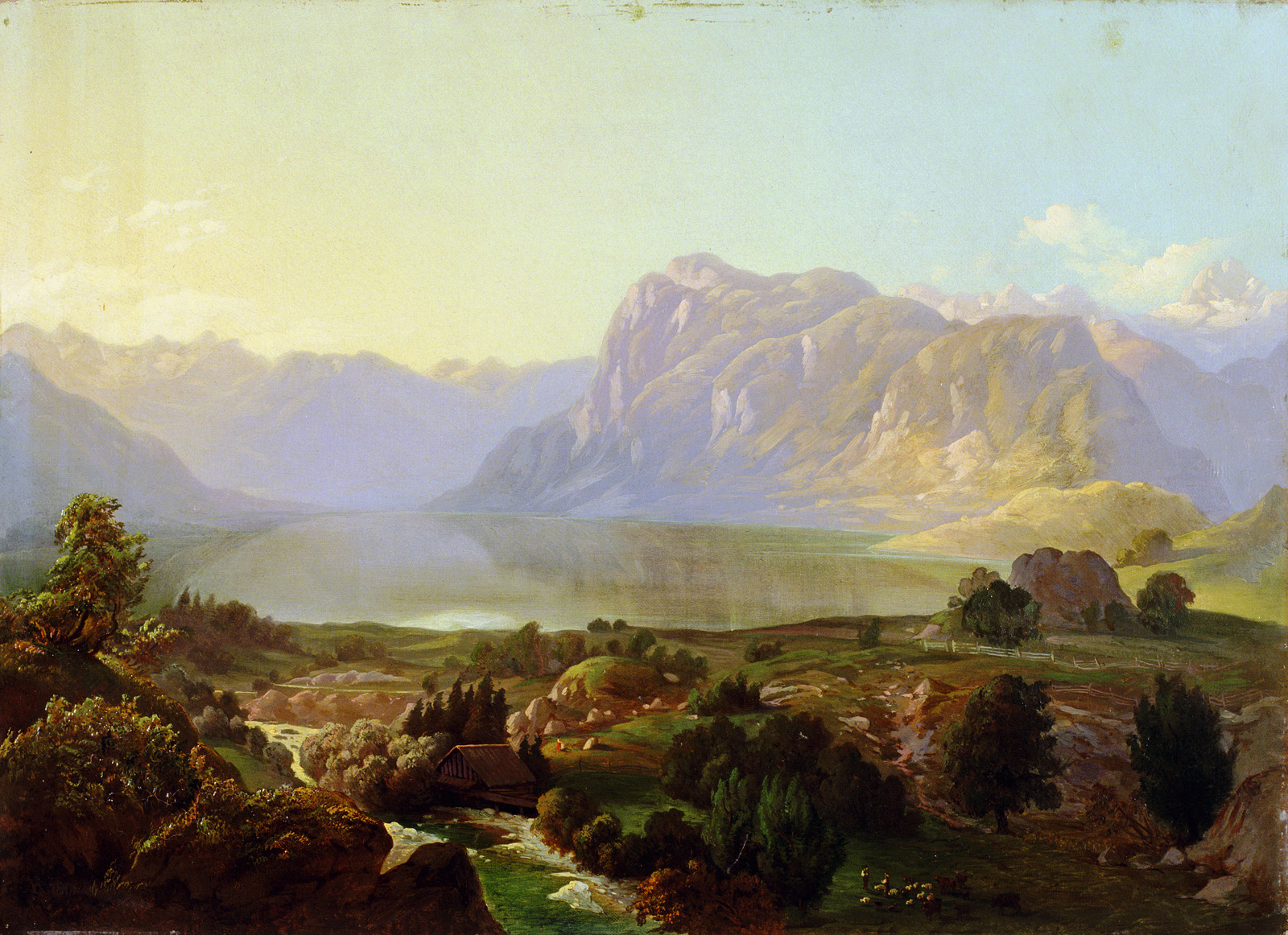
View of Lake Bohinj, 1862

His painting View of Mt. Triglav from Bohinj, along with other paintings of Triglav, became a symbol of the Carinthian Slovene people and is part of the core collection of the National Gallery of Slovenia.
