= Valentin Stanič =

Slovene priest

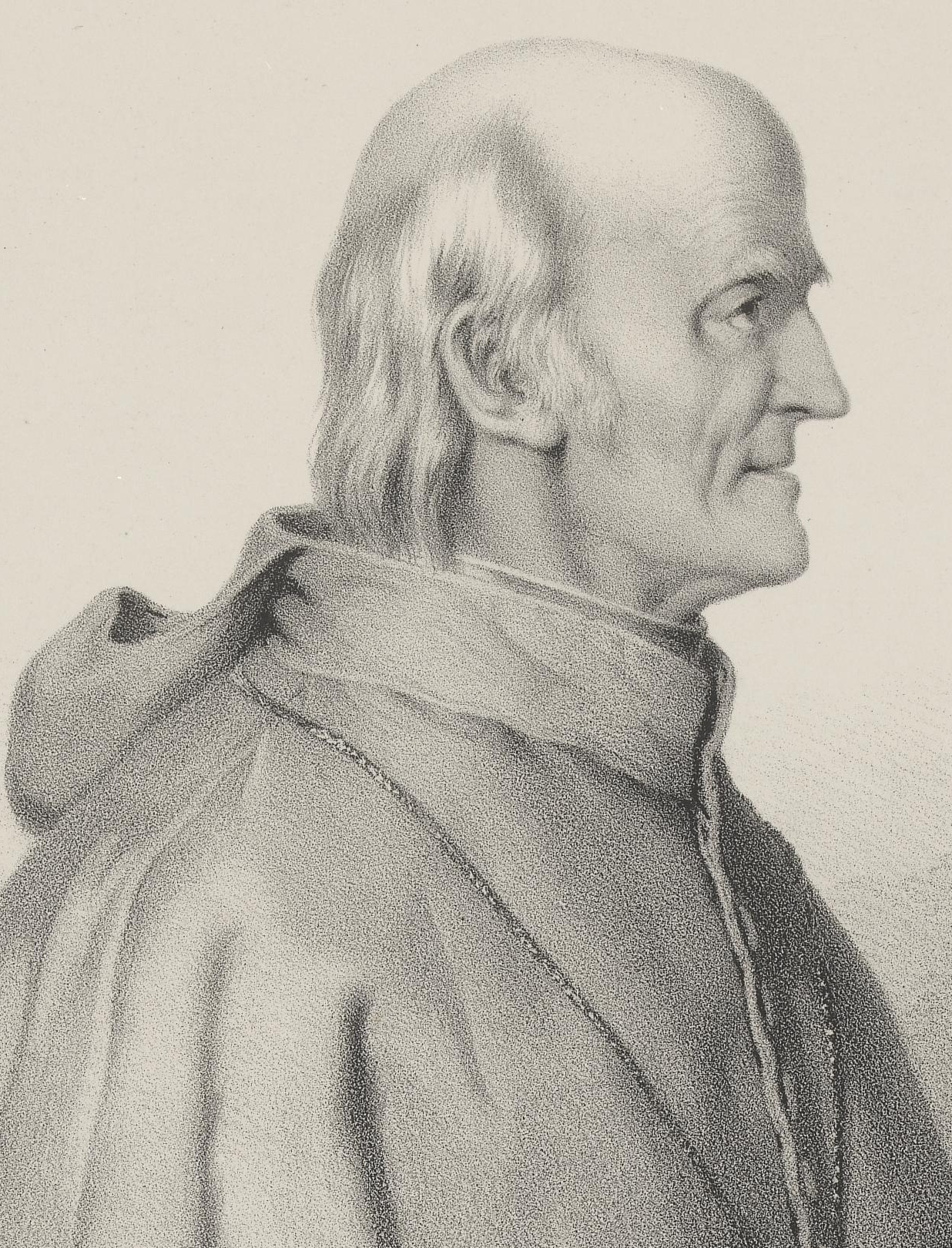
- Born: Valentin Stanig; 12 February 1774; Bodrež, Gorizia and Gradisca, Holy Roman Empire
- Died: 29 April 1847 (aged 73); Gorizia, Gorizia and Gradisca, Austrian Empire
- Occupation: Priest

Valentin Stanič or Stanig (12 February 1774 – 29 April 1847) was a Slovene Roman Catholic priest, mountaineer, poet, writer, translator, teacher, and cultural activist. He was born in Bodrež and died in Gorizia.

Stanič spelled his surname Stanig during his lifetime. The Slovenized spelling of his surname, Stanič, appeared by 1848, a year after his death.

The Stanič Shelter on Mount Triglav is named after the poet.

== Notable life events ==
- 1790 – began school in Tarvisio
- 1793 – arrived in Salzburg
- 1798 – entered the seminary
- 1800 – first to climb to the highest point of The Watzmann (2,713 m (8,901 ft))
- 1802 – finished his studies, and was ordained
- 1807 – founded a small printing office
- 1808 – climbed Triglav and measured its height (2,864 m (9,396 ft))
- 1822 – published the first Slovenian printed book in Gorizia: Songs for farmers and young people
- 1840 – founded the first Slovenian bookshop in Gorizia.
- 1845 – joined the "Association Against the Torture of Animals" in Munich
- 1846 – the first in what was then Austria in Gorizia founded Society for the Prevention of Cruelty to Animals

== Bibliography ==
- E.-M. Hüttl-Hubert: "Stanič (Stanig) Valentin". In: Österreichisches Biographisches Lexikon 1815–1950 (ÖBL). Vol. 13, Austrian Academy of Sciences, Vienna 2010, ISBN 978-3-7001-6963-5, p. 92 f. (Direct links to "p. 92", "p. 93")
- Peter Zimmermann (ed.): Valentin Stanič – Bergsteiger, Schriftsteller, Wohltäter. Eigenverlag der Bayerisch-Slowenischen Gesellschaft, Regensburg 2000. Digitalisat (PDF, 4.9 MB)
