= Aljaž (name) =

Aljaž is a Slovenian masculine given name and an occasional surname. Notable people with the name include:

== Given name ==
- Aljaž Bedene (born 1989), British tennis player
- Aljaž Cotman (born 1994), Slovenian football player
- Aljaž Hočevar (born 1991), Slovenian cyclist
- Aljaž Ivačič (born 1993), Slovenian football player
- Aljaž Krefl (born 1994), Slovenian football player
- Aljaž Pegan (born 1974), Slovenian gymnast
- Aljaž Sedej (born 1988), Slovenian judoka
- Aljaž Škorjanec (born 1990), Slovenian dancer and choreographer
- Aljaž Struna (born 1990), Slovenian football player

== Surname ==
- Jakob Aljaž (1845–1927), Slovene Catholic priest, composer and mountaineer
