= Ptujska Cesta =

- Location in Slovenia
- Coordinates: 46°38′9.95″N 15°59′33.15″E
- Country: Slovenia
- Traditional region: Styria
- Statistical region: Mura
- Municipality: Gornja Radgona

Area
  - Total: 1.9 km^{2} (0.73 sq mi)
- Elevation: 303.5 m (996 ft)

Population (2020)
  - Total: 191
  - Density: 100/km^{2} (260/sq mi)

Ptujska Cesta (pronounced [ˈptuːi̯ska ˈtseːsta]) is a dispersed settlement in the hills west of Gornja Radgona in northeastern Slovenia.

== Notable people ==
Notable people that were born or lived in Ptujska Cesta include the following:

- Matija Zemljič (1873–1934), Roman Catholic priest and poet
