= Belsazar Hacquet =

Physician and naturalist (c. 1739 – 1815)

Belsazar de la Motte Hacquet
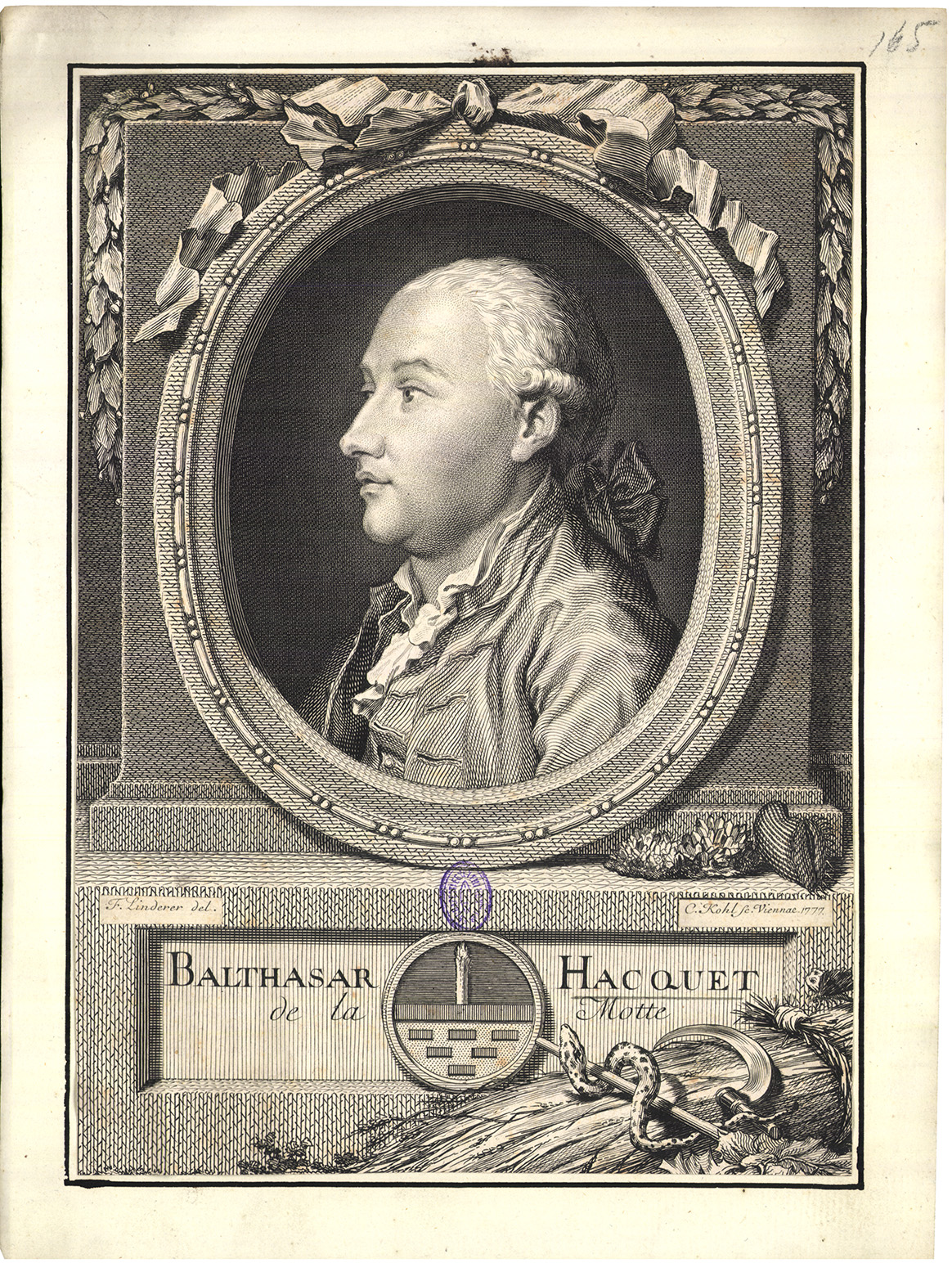
- Engraving of Hacquet (1777)
- Born: c. 1739
- Died: 10 January 1815
- Education: University of Vienna
- Known for: Oryctographia Carniolica; Exploration of the Julian Alps (attempt on Triglav, 1777); Early distinction of dolomite from limestone; Slavus Venedus Illyricus (ethnography)
- Scientific career
- Fields: Geology; Mineralogy; Botany; Chemistry; Ethnography; Petrology; Karst studies; Anatomy; Surgery
- Workplaces: Idrija (miners’ surgeon); Ljubljana Lyceum (teacher); Lviv University (professor); Jagiellonian University (Medical Faculty, dean)
- Author abbrev. (botany): Hacq.

Belsazar de la Motte Hacquet (also Balthasar or Balthazar Hacquet) (c. 1739 – 10 January 1815) was a Carniolan physician of French descent in the Enlightenment Era. He was a war surgeon, a surgeon in the mining town of Idrija, and a professor of anatomy and surgery in Laibach (now Ljubljana). He researched the geology and botany of Carniola, Istria, and nearby places, and was the first explorer of the Julian Alps. He also did ethnographical work among the South Slavic peoples, particularly among the Slovene-speaking population. He self-identified primarily as a chemist and introduced the methods of chemical analysis to Carniola.

== Life ==
Hacquet was mysterious about the time and place of his birth and the two have remained uncertain, although sources agree that he was an illegitimate child. Most sources have cited the information from his autobiography that he was born in 1739 or 1740 in Le Conquet, Brittany to an aristocratic father. When he lived in Ljubljana, he told Sigmund Zois that he was born to a Russian grandee, but this has not been supported by any sources. In 1821, the German lexicon Das Gelehrte Teutschland mentioned that he had been born in Metz, Lorraine. A 2003 investigation in the town archives in Metz has given further credence to the claim that Hacquet had been born in this town or its vicinity. The author hypothesised that Balthasar Hacquet was a son of a poor mother and an unknown father, baptised on 11 August 1736 as Jean. However, the question remains unsettled pending further research.

Hacquet studied in Vienna, and was a military surgeon during the Seven Years' War (1756–1763). From 1766 until 1773 he was the miners' surgeon and obstetrician in Idrija. In 1772 he became member of the Carniolan Agricultural Society. In 1773 he became a teacher of anatomy, physiology and obstetrics at Ljubljana Lyceum. From 1787 until 1805 he was a professor at the Lviv University (University of Lemberg). Then he worked in Kraków, where he stayed until 1809. In 1807 he became dean of the Medical Faculty. From 1810, when he retired, he lived in Vienna.

== Work ==
Oryctographia Carniolica, volume 4 (1784)

Hacquet is remembered for his scientific journeys throughout the Austrian Empire. He was a polymath, and performed research in the fields of geology, mineralogy, botany, chemistry, ethnography, petrology and karstology. He is recognized as the first scientist to perform extensive exploration of the Julian Alps. In 1777 he was the first to try to ascend to the top of Triglav (2864 m), the highest peak in Slovenia, and reached Mali Triglav (2725 m). In 1789 he published a description of the 1786 debris flow at the Slano Blato Landslide. He was the first after Carl Linnaeus to distinguish the mineral dolomite from the limestone and described it already in 1778, 13 years earlier than Déodat Gratet de Dolomieu, as the "stinking stone" (German: Stinkstein, Latin: lapis suillus). He met with Dolomieu in Laibach in 1784.

Among Hacquet's written works is the four-volume Oryctographia Carniolica, which included a geological and mineralogical study of Carniola, Istria, and surrounding districts. In this work, published in Leipzig from 1778 until 1789, he provided an in-depth report of the Idrija mercury mine, where he worked for some time with the physician and naturalist Giovanni Antonio Scopoli. He was also the author of an ethnographical study of South Slavic peoples called Slavus Venedus Illyricus. From 1774 to 1787, he was the secretary of the Carniolan Agricultural Society, members of which were also other prominent members of the Enlightenment, such as Sigmund Zois, Blaž Kumerdej, Gabriel Gruber, Peter Pavel Glavar, and Anton Tomaž Linhart.

As a botanist Hacquet wrote a book on alpine flora from Carniola called Plantae alpinae Carniolicae. The botanical genus Hacquetia (now sunk into Sanicula) is named after him, as well as the plant species Pedicularis hacquetii (Hacquet's lousewort). On one of his excursions, he discovered "on the evening, Trenta side of Triglav, a new species of scabious" and picked it for his herbarium collection, nowadays preserved in the Natural History Museum of Slovenia. He called the species Scabiosa trenta in the published description, and drew it. Many botanists have sought the mysterious pale yellow scabious, among them also the young Julius Kugy. He searched for the mysterious flower, and though he was not able to find it, this led him to become a great explorer and describer of the Julian Alps. The Austrian botanist, Anton Kerner von Marilaun, later proved Belsazar Hacquet had not found a new species, but a specimen of the already known submediterranean Cephalaria leucantha.

Hacquet was a fervent collector. In Ljubljana he operated a natural history cabinet (German: Naturalienkabinet), which was appreciated throughout Europe and was visited by the highest nobility, including the Holy Roman Emperor, Joseph II, the Russian grand duke Paul and Pope Pius VI, as well as by famous naturalists, such as Francesco Griselini and Franz Benedikt Hermann. It included a number of minerals, including specimens of mercury from the Idrija mine, a herbarium vivum with over 4,000 specimens of Carniolan and foreign plants, a smaller number of animal specimens, a natural history and medical library, and an anatomical theatre.

== Publications ==
- Slavus-Venedus-Illyricus; Abbildung und Beschreibung der südwest- und östlichen Wenden, Illyrer und Slaven
- Plantae alpinae carniolicae, 1782
- Hacquet's mineralogisch-botanische Lustreise, von dem Berg Terglou in Krain zu dem Berg Glockner in Tyrol, im Jahr 1779 und 81, 1783
- Hacquet's neueste physikalischpolitische Reisen in den Jahren 1788 und 1789 durch die dacischen und sarmatischen oder nördlichen Karpathe. two volumes, 1790–1791
- Reise durch die norischen Alpen physikalischen und andern Inhalts unternommen in den Jahren 1784 bis 1786 ... Nuremberg, 1791
- Physische und technische Beschreibung der Flintensteine... Viena, 1792
- Bemerkungen über die Entstehung der Feuer- oder Flintensteine, etc. Berlin, 1806
- L'Illyrie et la Dalmatie, ou mœurs, usages et costumes de leurs habitants... (translation from German to French for Jean Baptiste Joseph Breton de La Martinière (1777–1852), two volumes, 1815

== Commemoration ==
A memorial relief to Belsazar Hacquet was erected in 1987 in Ljubljana at Upper Square (Slovene: Gornji trg) on the facade of the house No. 4, where he lived from 1773 to 1787 and operated his cabinet. The relief is work of the sculptor Albin Ambrožič. He has been also commemorated in a new species of fossil coral: Aulopora hacqueti Zapalski, 2005
