= Dovje =

- Village
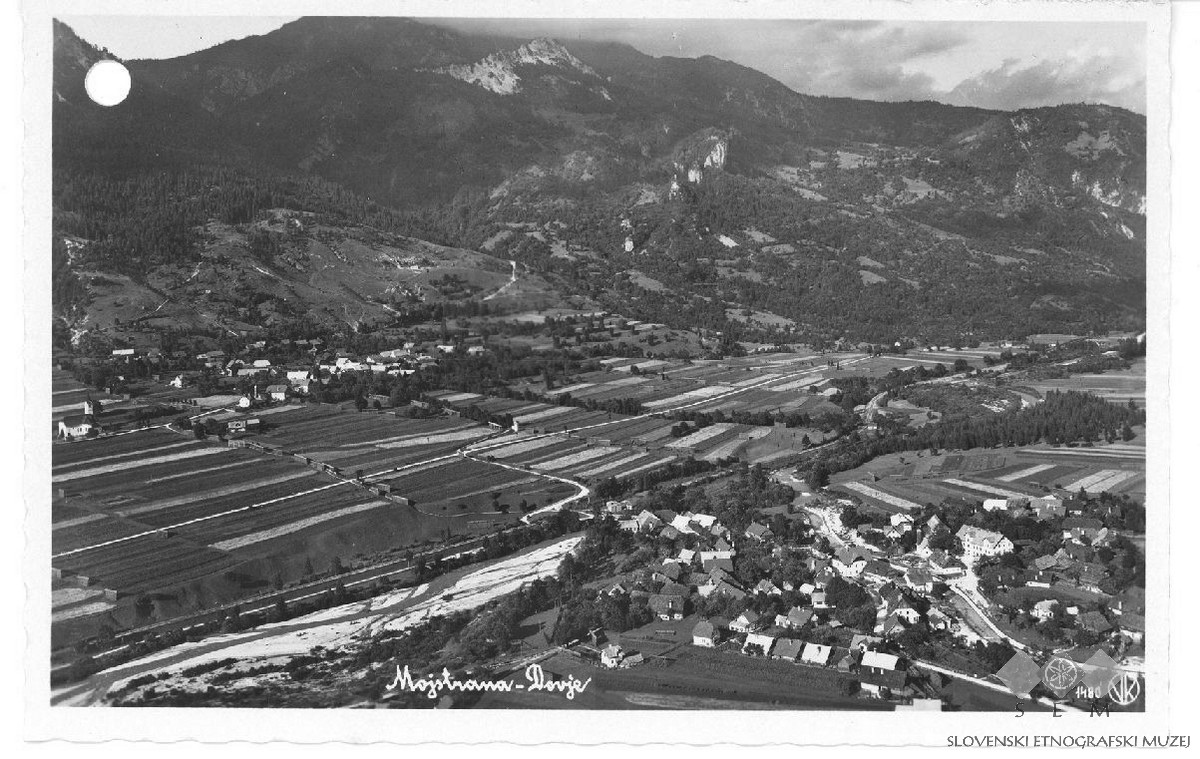
- Postcard of Dovje

- Location in Slovenia
- Coordinates: 46°28′46.46″N 13°56′13.94″E
- Country: Slovenia
- Traditional region: Upper Carniola
- Statistical region: Upper Carniola
- Municipality: Kranjska Gora
- Elevation: 703 m (2,306 ft)

Population (2002)
  - Total: 609
  - Density: 22/km^{2} (57/sq mi)
- Postal code: 4281 Mojstrana
- Area code: 04 (4 if calling from abroad)

Dovje (pronounced [ˈdoːu̯jɛ]; German: Lengenfeld) is a village in the Municipality of Kranjska Gora in the Upper Carniola region of Slovenia, located on the southern slopes of the Karawanks at an elevation of 703 m. It has a rich history and rural tradition and is known as one of the sunniest villages in Slovenia. Its location is ideal for farming, and this has been the main occupation of its inhabitants for many centuries.

== Name ==
Dovje was attested in historical sources in 1029 as Lenginvuélt, in 1065 as Lenginvelt, and in 1318 as Langenuelt. The Slovene name is based on a translation of the German name (literally, 'long field'), presumably through dialect development from *dolgē (polje) 'long field', referring to the configuration of the village's territory.

== Cultural heritage ==
The village has preserved a number of elements typical of alpine architecture. The most interesting of these are the arched front doors of the old houses. The view toward the Julian Alps from the village has made the cemetery next to St. Michael's Church an appropriate final resting place for many hikers that lost their lives on Mount Triglav and the surrounding mountains.

== Notable people ==
Notable people that were born or lived in Dovje include:

- Jakob Aljaž (1847–1927), poet, composer, and mountain enthusiast
- Joško Janša (1900–1960), cross-country skier
- Franjo Jeglič (1856–1935), beekeeper
