= Janez Istenič =

Janez Istenič (born 23 December 1940) is a Slovenian winemaker and former footballer.

== Early life ==
Istenič was born in 1940 in Ljubljana, Slovenia. He was regarded as a Slovenia goalkeeper prospect.

== International career ==
Istenič represented Yugoslavia internationally at youth level.

== Post-playing career ==
Istenič has been regarded as the first producer of sparkling wine in Slovenia.

== Personal life ==
Istenič's father was a train driver.
