= Oryctographia Carniolica =

18th-century book

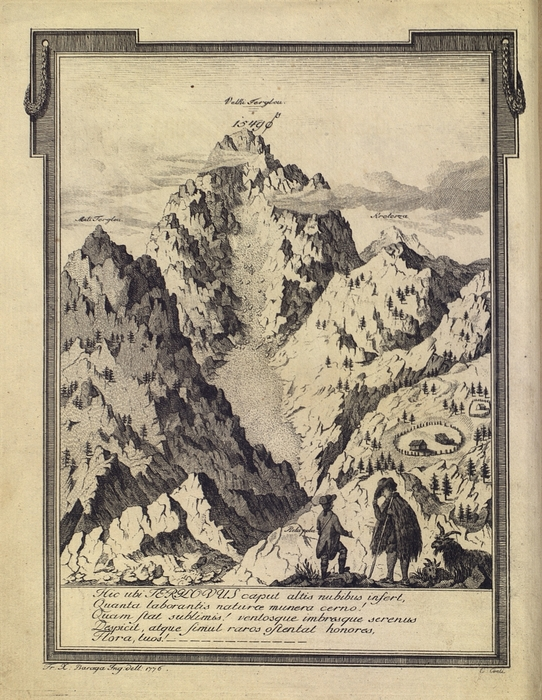
Triglav and the Velo Polje Alp, Oryctographia Carniolica, 1778

Oryctographia Carniolica (Carniolan Mineralogy; with the subtitle oder Physikalische Erdbeschreibung des Herzogthums Krain, Istrien, und zum Theil der benachbarten Länder 'or a Physical Geography of the Duchy of Carniola, Istria, and in Part the Neighboring Lands') is a four-volume work by Belsazar Hacquet, published in Leipzig in 1778, 1781, 1784, and 1789. It discusses the physical properties of the Duchy of Carniola, Istria, and parts of the neighboring lands. It also includes an in-depth description of the Idrija mercury mine.

The front page of the work presents the first known depiction of Triglav, the highest mountain in Slovenia. The copper engraving was produced by Carl Conti after a drawing by Franz Xaver Baraga.
