= Matija Zemljič =

Slovene Roman Catholic priest and poet (1873–1934)

- Born: January 25, 1873; Ptujska Cesta, Austria-Hungary
- Died: July 26, 1934 (aged 61); Tomaž pri Ormožu, Kingdom of Yugoslavia
- Occupations: Roman Catholic priest and poet

Matija Zemljič (January 25, 1873 – July 26, 1934) was a Slovene Roman Catholic priest, poet, and translator.

== Early life and education ==
Matija Zemljič was born in Ptujska Cesta to a winegrower father, Franc Zemljič, and his wife Apolonia (née Klobasa). Soon after he was born, his family relocated to Norički Vrh. Zemljič attended high school in Maribor from 1886 to 1893. He then studied theology in Maribor from 1893 to 1897, and he was ordained a priest in 1897.

== Career ==
After numerous positions as a curate (in Šmartno pri Slovenj Gradcu, Vuzenica, Dobrna, and elsewhere), in 1905 Zemljič became the caretaker of the church at Jurski Vrh. From 1906 to 1914 he was the parish priest there, and then until his death he was the parish priest in Tomaž pri Ormožu.

Zemljič already wrote religious-lyric poems as a seminarian and published them in various newspapers. In the manuscript journal Lipica (1894) his poem "Oj, Triglav, moj dom" (Oh Triglav, My Home) was published under the pseudonym Slavin. It was later set to music by Jakob Aljaž and published in his Slovenska pesmarica II (1900), and it has become popular today. The text is not entirely original; Zemljič based it on Ludwig Auerbach's German patriotic poem "O Schwarzwald, o Heimat" (Oh, Black Forest, oh, Homeland).

The wish expressed by the Lavantine bishop Mihael Napotnik in his book Einweihungsfeier der neuerbauten Pfarrkirche zur hl . Maria (Consecration Ceremony for the Newly Built Saint Mary's Parish Church) inspired Zemljič's translation of an old German medieval poem by the Carthusian Brother Philipp of Žiče; he transcribed 10,133 of Philipp's verses into 11,272 Slovenian ones and also wrote a short introduction to the publication of the work Kartuzijanskega brata Filipa Marijino življenje (The Carthusian Brother Philipp's Life of Mary).
