= Planinski Vestnik =

Slovenian monthly magazine

- Editor: Vladimir Habjan
- Categories: Mountaineering, skiing
- Frequency: Monthly
- Publisher: Alpine Association of Slovenia
- Founded: 1895
- Country: Slovenia
- Based in: Ljubljana
- Language: Slovene
- Website: www.planinskivestnik.com
- ISSN: 0350-4344
- OCLC: 6715971

Planinski Vestnik (Slovene: Planinski vestnik; translation: Alpine Gazette) is a Slovenian monthly magazine, published by the Alpine Association of Slovenia (Planinska zveza Slovenije). It was first published in 1895 by the Association's predecessor, the Slovene Alpine Society (Slovensko planinsko društvo).

== Editors ==
The following people have been editors-in-chief of the magazine:

1895-1908	Anton Mikuš
1908-1941	Josip Tominšek
1941-1949	Arnošt Brilej
1950-1979	Tine Orel
1980-1985	Marijan Krišelj
1986	Milan Cilenšek
1986-2001	Marjan Raztresen
2001-present	Vladimir Habjan

== See also ==
- List of magazines in Slovenia
