= Janež =

Janež is a surname. Notable people with the surname include:

- Andrej Janež, Slovenian diabetologist and diabetes researcher
- Janez Janež (1913–1990), Slovenian medical doctor and surgeon, who worked for most of his life in Taiwan
- Karel Janež (1914–2006), Slovenian gymnast
- Korina Janež (born 2004), Slovenian footballer
