= Andrej Janež =

Slovenian diabetologist and diabetes researcher

Andrej Janež is a Slovenian diabetologist and diabetes researcher. Janež is the Head of Department of Endocrinology, Diabetes and Metabolic Disease at University Medical Centre Ljubljana, Assistant Professor for Internal Medicine at the Medical University Ljubljana, Chairman of the Advances in Diabetes and Insulin Therapy conference, member of the advisory board for peroral antidiabetic therapy in Servier Pharma, member for Slovenia in the Diabetes Education Study Group at European Association for the Study of Diabetes, and member of the European advisory board for continuous glucose monitoring system in development for Lifescan.

Janež authored numerous articles on diabetology and indexed by Science Citation Index, co-edited a clinical manual on continuous subcutaneous insulin infusion therapy, or insulin pump treatment. The latter is also the best known area of Janež's scientific work, as he introduced insulin pump treatment to India, Turkey, China, Slovenia, and several other countries, where he also led the effort of educating teams of diabetologists required for a continuous application of the technique.

== Education ==
- MD, 1996, School of Medicine, University of Ljubljana
- MS, 1998, School of Medicine, University of Ljubljana with thesis "Effects of chromium on blood pressure in humans"
- PhD, 2000, Diabetology School of Medicine, University of California, San Diego, with thesis Mechanism of glucose transport in insulin resistant 3T3-L1 adipocytes
- Post doctoral, 2005, Joslin Diabetes Clinic, Boston, study on insulin pump therapy in type 1 diabetic patients

== Work ==
Upon his return from the U.S., Janež introduced the insulin pump method into clinical practice of treating adult patients with type 1 diabetes in Slovenia. Together with his colleagues from the Department of Endocrinology, Diabetes, and Metabolic Disease at University Medical Centre Ljubljana, Janež co-authored the algorithm used in insulin pump treatment, as well as tutored virtually all Slovenian diabetologists in usage of both insulin pump and glucose sensor. Janež also wrote all of the literature on subjects of functional insulin therapy and insulin pump in Slovenia, with its audiences ranging from diabetologists to patients. In 2008, he established a new unit for functional insulin therapy within the University Medical Centre.

Janež also led the effort of forming international standards for interpretation of results obtained with glucose sensor, publishing and presenting these on several international diabetes-related symposiums.

Coupled with his previous work in the field of functional insulin therapy and its pilot implementation in Slovenia, Janež went on to introduce this approach to diabetes treatment in other countries.

== Publications ==
- Pratley, Richard E; Nauck, Michael; Bailey, Timothy; Montanya, Eduard; Cuddihy, Robert; Filetti, Sebastiano; Thomsen, Anne Bloch; Søndergaard, Rie Elvang; Davies, Melanie (2010). "Liraglutide versus sitagliptin for patients with type 2 diabetes who did not have adequate glycaemic control with metformin: a 26-week, randomised, parallel-group, open-label trial". The Lancet. 375 (9724): 1447–56. doi:10.1016/S0140-6736(10)60307-8. PMID 20417856. S2CID 3291387.
- Buse, John B; Rosenstock, Julio; Sesti, Giorgio; Schmidt, Wolfgang E; Montanya, Eduard; Brett, Jason H; Zychma, Marcin; Blonde, Lawrence (2009). "Liraglutide once a day versus exenatide twice a day for type 2 diabetes: a 26-week randomised, parallel-group, multinational, open-label trial (LEAD-6)". The Lancet. 374 (9683): 39–47. doi:10.1016/S0140-6736(09)60659-0. PMID 19515413. S2CID 25135640.
- Jensterle, M.; Sebestjen, M.; Janez, A.; Prezelj, J.; Kocjan, T.; Keber, I.; Pfeifer, M. (2008). "Improvement of endothelial function with metformin and rosiglitazone treatment in women with polycystic ovary syndrome". European Journal of Endocrinology. 159 (4): 399–406. doi:10.1530/EJE-08-0507. PMID 18653546.
- Jensterle, M; Weber, M; Pfeifer, M; Prezelj, J; Pfutzner, A; Janez, A (2008). "Assessment of insulin resistance in young women with polycystic ovary syndrome". International Journal of Gynecology & Obstetrics. 102 (2): 137–40. doi:10.1016/j.ijgo.2008.03.017. PMID 18504045. S2CID 13513083.
- Jensterle, M.; Janez, A.; Mlinar, B.; Marc, J.; Prezelj, J.; Pfeifer, M. (2008). "Impact of metformin and rosiglitazone treatment on glucose transporter 4 mRNA expression in women with polycystic ovary syndrome". European Journal of Endocrinology. 158 (6): 793–801. doi:10.1530/EJE-07-0857. PMID 18322300.
- Jensterle, Mojca; Janez, Andrej; Vrtovec, Bojan; Meden-Vrtovec, Helena; Pfeifer, Marija; Prezelj, Janez; Kocjan, Tomaz (2007). "Decreased Androgen Levels and Improved Menstrual Pattern after Angiotensin II Receptor Antagonist Telmisartan Treatment in Four Hypertensive Patients with Polycystic Ovary Syndrome: Case Series". Croatian Medical Journal. 48 (6): 864–70. doi:10.3325/cmj.2007.6.864. PMC 2213810. PMID 18074422.
- Silič, Anja; Janež, Andrej; Tomažič, Janez; Karner, Primož; Vidmar, Ludvik; Sharma, Prem; Matičič, Mojca (2007). "Effect of Rosiglitazone and Metformin on Insulin Resistance in Patients Infected with Human Immunodeficiency Virus Receiving Highly Active Antiretroviral Therapy Containing Protease Inhibitor: Randomized Prospective Controlled Clinical Trial". Croatian Medical Journal. 48 (6): 791–9. doi:10.3325/cmj.2007.6.791. PMC 2213797. PMID 18074413.
- Steiner, Charles A.; Janez, Andrej; Jensterle, Mojca; Reisinger, Katrin; Forst, Thomas; Pfützner, Andreas (2007). "Impact of treatment with rosiglitazone or metformin on biomarkers for insulin resistance and metabolic syndrome in patients with polycystic ovary syndrome". Journal of Diabetes Science and Technology. 1 (2): 211–7. doi:10.1177/193229680700100212. PMC 2771474. PMID 19888409.
- Mlinar, B; Marc, J; Janez, A; Pfeifer, M (2007). "Molecular mechanisms of insulin resistance and associated diseases". Clinica Chimica Acta. 375 (1–2): 20–35. doi:10.1016/j.cca.2006.07.005. PMID 16956601.
- Tomazic, J; Karner, P; Vidmar, L; Maticic, M; Sharma, PM; Janez, A (2005). "Effect of metformin and rosiglitazone on lipid metabolism in HIV infected patients receiving protease inhibitor containing HAART". Acta Dermatovenerologica Alpina, Pannonica et Adriatica. 14 (3): 99–105. PMID 16200335.
- Tomažič, Janez; Silič, Anja; Karner, Primož; Vidmar, Ludvik; Matičič, Mojca; Poljak, Mario; Ihan, Alojz; Janež, Andrej (2004). "Lipodystrophy and metabolic abnormalities in Slovenian HIV-infected patients". Wiener Klinische Wochenschrift. 116 (21–22): 755–9. doi:10.1007/s00508-004-0268-9. PMID 15628647. S2CID 24715784.
- Tomazic, M.; Janez, A.; Sketelj, A.; Kocijancic, A.; Eckel, J.; Sharma, P. (2002). "Comparison of alterations in insulin signalling pathway in adipocytes from type II diabetic pregnant women and women with gestational diabetes mellitus". Diabetologia. 45 (4): 502–8. doi:10.1007/s00125-002-0791-z. PMID 12032625. (Retracted)
- Hevener, A.; Reichart, D.; Janez, A.; Olefsky, J. (2002). "Female Rats Do Not Exhibit Free Fatty Acid-Induced Insulin Resistance". Diabetes. 51 (6): 1907–12. doi:10.2337/diabetes.51.6.1907. PMID 12031980.
- Hevener, A. L.; Reichart, D.; Janez, A.; Olefsky, J. (2001). "Thiazolidinedione Treatment Prevents Free Fatty Acid-Induced Insulin Resistance in Male Wistar Rats". Diabetes. 50 (10): 2316–22. doi:10.2337/diabetes.50.10.2316. PMID 11574414.
- Ravnik-Oblak, M; Janez, A; Kocijanicic, A (2001). "Insulinoma induced hypoglycemia in a type 2 diabetic patient". Wiener Klinische Wochenschrift. 113 (9): 339–41. PMID 11388080.
- Janez, A. (2000). "The osmotic shock-induced glucose transport pathway in 3T3-L1 adipocytes is mediated by Gab-1 and requires Gab-1 associated phosphatidylinositol 3-kinase activity for full activation". Journal of Biological Chemistry. 275 (35): 26870–6. doi:10.1074/jbc.M001654200. PMID 10842168.
- Janez, A.; Worrall, DS; Olefsky, JM (2000). "Insulin-Mediated Cellular Insulin Resistance Decreases Osmotic Shock-Induced Glucose Transport in 3T3-L1 Adipocytes". Endocrinology. 141 (12): 4657–63. doi:10.1210/endo.141.12.7801. PMID 11108280.
