= Janez Janša (director) =

Croatian theater director

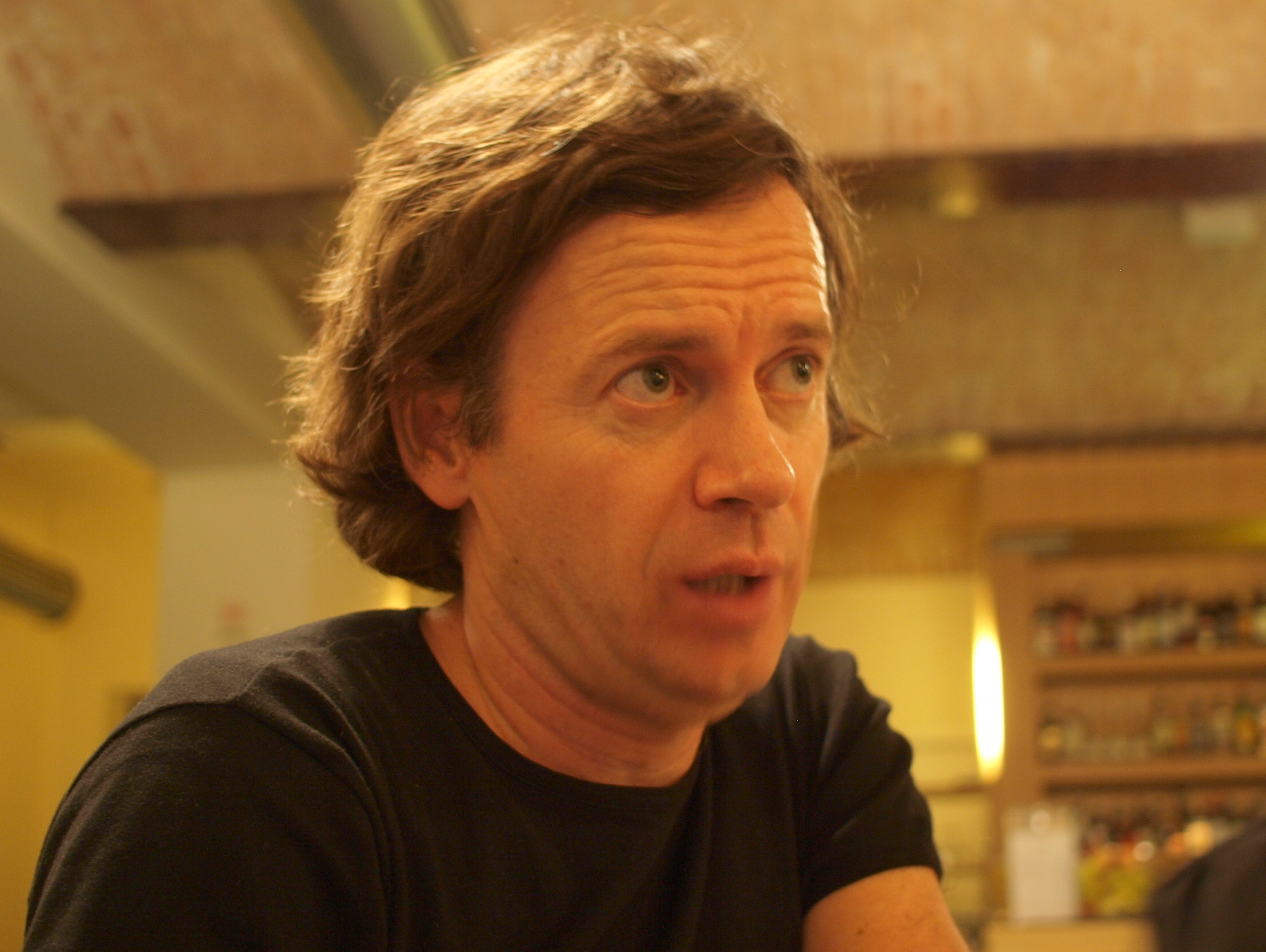
- Born: 6 February 1964 (age 62); Rijeka, Yugoslavia (now Croatia)
- Education: University of Ljubljana
- Occupation: Theatre director

Janez Janša (born 6 February 1964 as Emil Hrvatin) is one of the three contemporary artists who changed their names in 2007 to Janez Janša, the name of the Slovenian centre-right politician Janez Janša. He is an editor, theatre and film director, and contemporary performing artist.

== Life ==
He studied sociology and theatre directing at the University of Ljubljana, Slovenia and performance theory at the University of Antwerp, Belgium.

From 1999 to 2006, he was editor-in-chief and director of the journal Maska. Titles edited by him include a reader of contemporary theatre theories and a reader of contemporary dance theories.

Since 1999 he has been the director of the Maska publishing house in Ljubljana, Slovenia.

In 2007, he and other two Slovene contemporary artists, Janez Janša (performance artist) and Janez Janša (visual artist), together officially changed their names to Janez Janša, the name of the Slovenian centre-right politician Janez Janša.

In 2008, the magazine Mladina published his biography and a month later, together with Janez Janša (performance artist) and Janez Janša (visual artist), he co-edited the book NAME Readymade.

== Work ==
He regularly curates interdisciplinary workshops around Europe and the United States and he is the initiator of the organization P.E.A.C.E. – Peacekeepers' Entertainment, Art and Cultural Exchange (with Mare Bulc).

He wrote a book on Flemish artist and theatre maker Jan Fabre. As an editor, he has published numerous essays on contemporary theatre and art, also working as a performance artist, and video and film maker. As performer he was involved in the improvisation project At the Table curated by Meg Stuart.

In 1998, "Cammillo – Memo 1.0: Construction of Theatre", directed by himself, was presented in Milan, Italy, at the Piccolo Teatro.

In 2000, European biennale of contemporary arts, Manifesta 3, was opened by his "Drive in Camillo".

His piece "We are all Marlene Dietrich" was performed for soldiers in peace-keeping missions (with Erna Omarsdottir).

In 2006, he made a reconstruction of the piece from 1969, "Pupilija, Papa Pupilo and the Pupilecks", presented at Slovenian National Theatre in 2007.

He created a series of performances dealing with the status of performance in neoliberal societies, such as a tear donor session and interdisciplinary artistic and research project The First World Camp. He did a reconstruction action Mount Triglav with the other two artists called Janez Janša on Mount Triglav.

In 2012, in context of Janez Janša being accused of Machiavellian political maneuvering when he took the Prime minister's seat instead of Zoran Jankovič who was relative winner at the 2011 elections, the three Janez Janšas have together filmed a documentary about the name change, My name is Janez Janša (Jaz sem Janez Janša).

In 2018, together with Janez Janša (performance artist) and Janez Janša (visual artist), he ran for office during the Slovenia national elections, as a way to confront Janez Janša, the leader of the conservative Slovenian Democratic Party (SDS) in his home district of Grosuplje. He presented about this project at the 2018 conference INFILTRATION of the Disruption Network Lab in Berlin, Germany.

== Publications ==
- 1994 Jan Fabre – La discipline du chaos, le chaos de la discipline, Armand Colin, Paris.
- 1996 Presence, Representation, Theatricality: Maska, Ljubljana.
- 2001 Theories of Contemporary Dance: Maska, Ljubljana.
