= Alpine Association of Slovenia =

Climbing organization

Logo of the Alpine Association of Slovenia

The Alpine Association of Slovenia (Slovene: Planinska zveza Slovenije) is the association of volunteer Alpine clubs (planinsko društvo) providing the conditions for the development and exercising of mountaineering and hill walking in Slovenia and abroad. It is among the Slovenian non-governmental organisations with the highest membership and has the largest number of members of all sports organisations in Slovenia.

As of October 2015, the association included 287 branches (mountaineering/hill walking clubs, mountain rescue stations, etc.), which altogether had 53,975 (as of 2014) members of all ages. It maintained 2008 mountain trails with a total length of over 10,000 km (6,200 mi) (of this, 80 long-distance trails) and 179 mountain lodges and bivouac shelters with c. 7,400 beds. It was established in June 1948 in Ljubljana and is the successor of the Slovene Alpine Club (Slovensko planinsko društvo), established in Ljubljana on 27 February 1893.

The Alpine Association of Slovenia performs its tasks under the leadership of its President and three Vice-Presidents, an expert service, and several commissions: economic commission, climbing commission, mountain sports commission, commissions for expeditions to foreign mountains, mountain trails, sport climbing, mountain biking, conservation of the mountain environment, guides' commission, youth commission, and several boards and other workforces.

The Alpine Publishing House, operating under the auspices of the Association, publishes mountain hiking maps and guides, professional and belletristic literature, and, since 1895, the monthly mountaineering magazine Planinski Vestnik (Alpine Gazette).
