= Janez Janša (performance artist) =

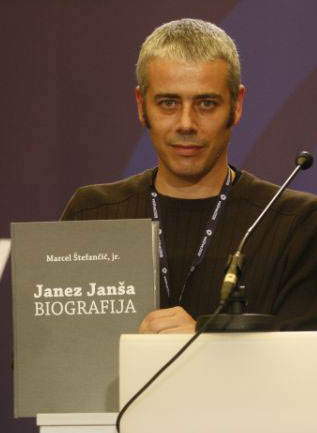

Conceptual artist

Personal details
- Born: 7 December 1970 (age 55) Bergamo, Italy
- Education: Academy of Fine Arts of Milan

Janez Janša (born 7 December 1970 in Bergamo, Italy, as Davide Grassi) is one of the three contemporary artists who in 2007 changed their names to Janez Janša, the name of the Slovenian right-wing politician Janez Janša. He is a conceptual artist, performer and producer graduated from the Academy of Fine Arts of Milan, Italy. His work has a strong social connotation and is characterized by an inter-media approach. He is co-founder and director of Aksioma – Institute for Contemporary Art, Ljubljana.

His first public artistic project was the urban installation "I Need Money to Be an Artist,"which was presented first in Ljubljana, Slovenia (1996) and then in Venice, Italy. In 2001 he became President of the Management Board of “Problemarket.com – the Problem Stock Exchange”, a virtual platform on which shares of companies dealing with problems are floated. The following year Janša produced “machinaZOIS” an electromechanical patron that financially supports contemporary artists and artistic productions. Then he started the development of “DemoKino – Virtual Biopolitical Agora”, a virtual parliament that through topical film parables provides the voters with the opportunity to decide on issues that are becoming the essence of modern politics: the questions of life. In 2005 Janša established the platform “RE:akt!” that examines media's role in manipulating perceptions and creating (post)modern historical myths and contemporary mythology. A part of this platform is the project “Mount Triglav on Mount Triglav” by Janez Janša, Janez Janša and Janez Janša.

Parallelly to these socio-political projects Janša investigated the field of virtual reality and neurofeedback technologies.

During 2000-2002 he developed and performed with Darij Kreuh "Brainscore – Incorporeal Communication", a performance for two operators, which act in a virtual reality environment through their avatars.

During 2004–2007 he led the project "Brainloop", an interactive performance platform which allows a subject to navigate a virtual space merely by imagining specific motor commands.

Janez Janša is editor of the book "La Carta del Carnaro / The Charter of Carnaro" (2009) and co-editor of the textual and pictorial reader "DemoKino – Virtual Biopolitical Agora" (2006), of the book "NAME - Readymade" (2008), "RE:akt! - Reconstruction, Re-enactment, Re-reporting" (2009) and "Signature".

In September 2008 Mladina published biography of the three Janez Janšas. and a month later he co-edited (together with Janez Janša (director) and Janez Janša (visual artist)) the book NAME Readymade.
