= Janez Janša (visual artist) =

Slovenian Contemporary Artist

- Born: Žiga Kariž; 1973 (age 52–53); Ljubljana, Slovenia

Žiga Kariž (born in 1973 as Žiga Kariž in Ljubljana, changed his name to Janez Janša in 2008, but again changed his name back to Žiga Kariž in 2012) is one of the three contemporary artists who in 2007 changed their names to Janez Janša, the name of the Slovenian right-wing politician Janez Janša. He is a visual artist.

His main focus is more in the ideology of painting itself rather than in expanding the field of painting. He represents the younger generation of artists, who problematise the field of painting through the use of media image and a free relationship with various technological processes. He deconstructs the social role of painting and the position of the viewer. The theme of his paintings is often media, especially film, which continues to shape his perception most today.

In 2003, at the Venice Biennale he hung his paintings in the homes of temporary owners and the paintings had built-in cameras that transmitted images to the gallery in real time. These were paintings from the series titled Terror=decor, which examines how both media and artistic imagery, especially modern imagery, changes into décor in the service of capitalism.

In September 2008, Mladina published a biography of the three Janez Janšas and a month later he co-edited together with Janez Janša (director) and Janez Janša (performance artist) the book NAME Readymade.
