= Ruše Lodge =

Mountain lodge in Slovenia

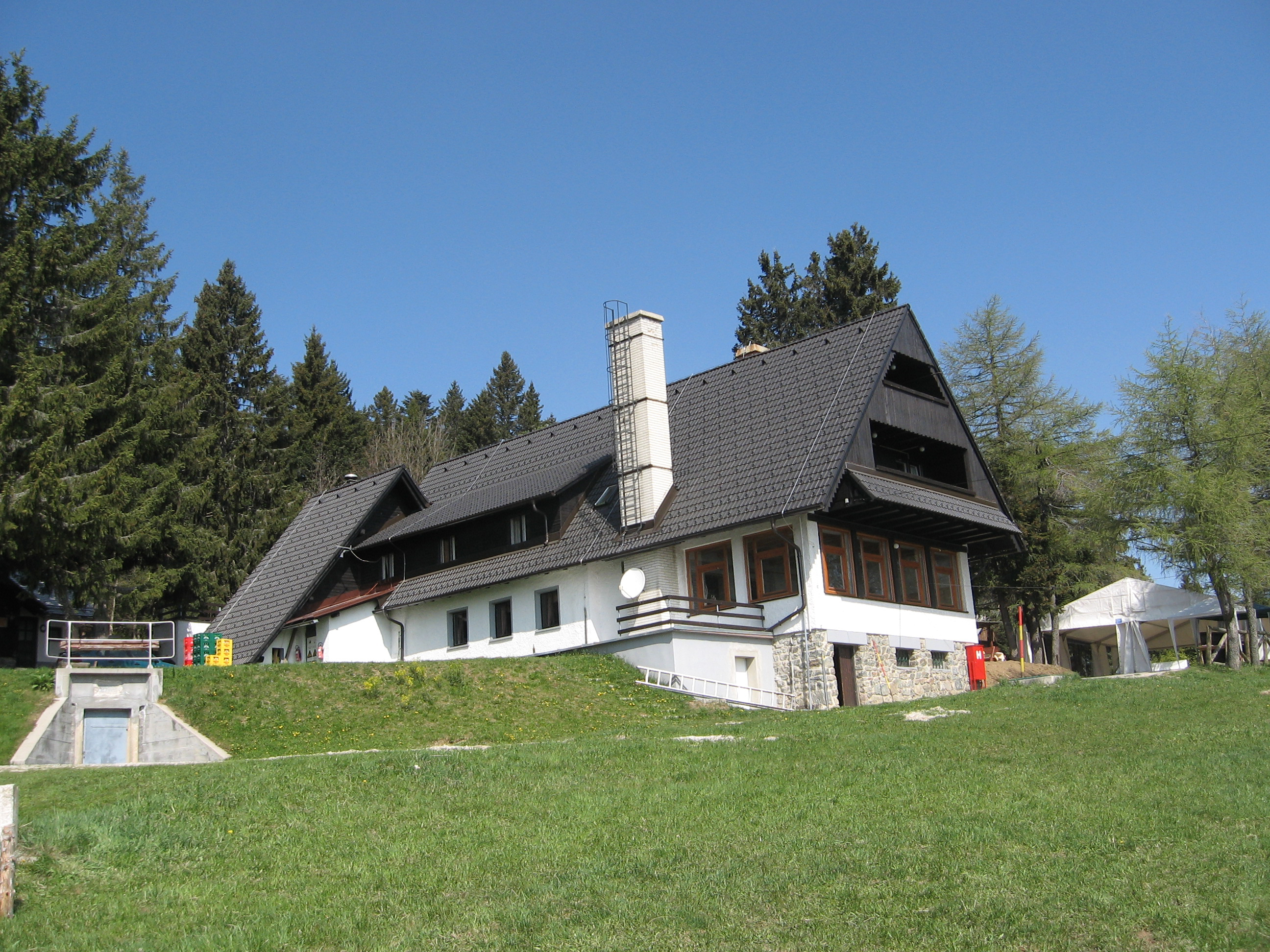

Highest point
- Elevation: 1,246 m (4,088 ft)
- Coordinates: 46°29′43″N 15°30′31″E

Naming
- Native name: Ruška koča (Slovene)

Geography
- Location within Slovenia
- Location: Slovenia
- Parent range: Pohorje

The Ruše Lodge (Slovene: Ruška koča), or the Tine Lodge at Areh (Tinetov dom pri Arehu; 1,246 m or 4,088 ft) is a mountain lodge in the Pohorje Mountains (northeastern Slovenia), built by locals in 1907. It is open through the whole year.

== History ==
Before World War II, three lodges – Ruše Lodge, Čander Lodge (Čandrova koča; named after an old Pohorje family Robnik–Čander), and Planika, together with St. Henry's Church (cerkev sv. Areha), formed a mountain resort. The lodges were burned during the war. The current lodge was built in 1946 and expanded in 1977. Due to the demand, a new Čander Lodge was also built.

== Starting points ==
- 3½ hr drive from Ruše, passing an old limekiln
- 4 hr drive from Ruše over Smolnik, passing the Šumnik Falls
- 5 hr drive from Slovenska Bistrica, passing the Štuhec Lodge
- 3½ hr drive from Fram through he village of Planica
- 2 hr drive from Šmartno na Pohorju passing the Videc drag lift
- 2½ hr drive from Šmartno na Pohorju through Bojtina, passing the Zgornji Bojčnik Farm
- By car from Hoče (18 km or 11 mi), or from Ruše (14 km or 8.7 mi) or Slovenska Bistrica (26 km or 16 mi)

== See also ==
- Slovenian Mountain Hiking Trail
