= Stenar =

Mountain in Slovenia

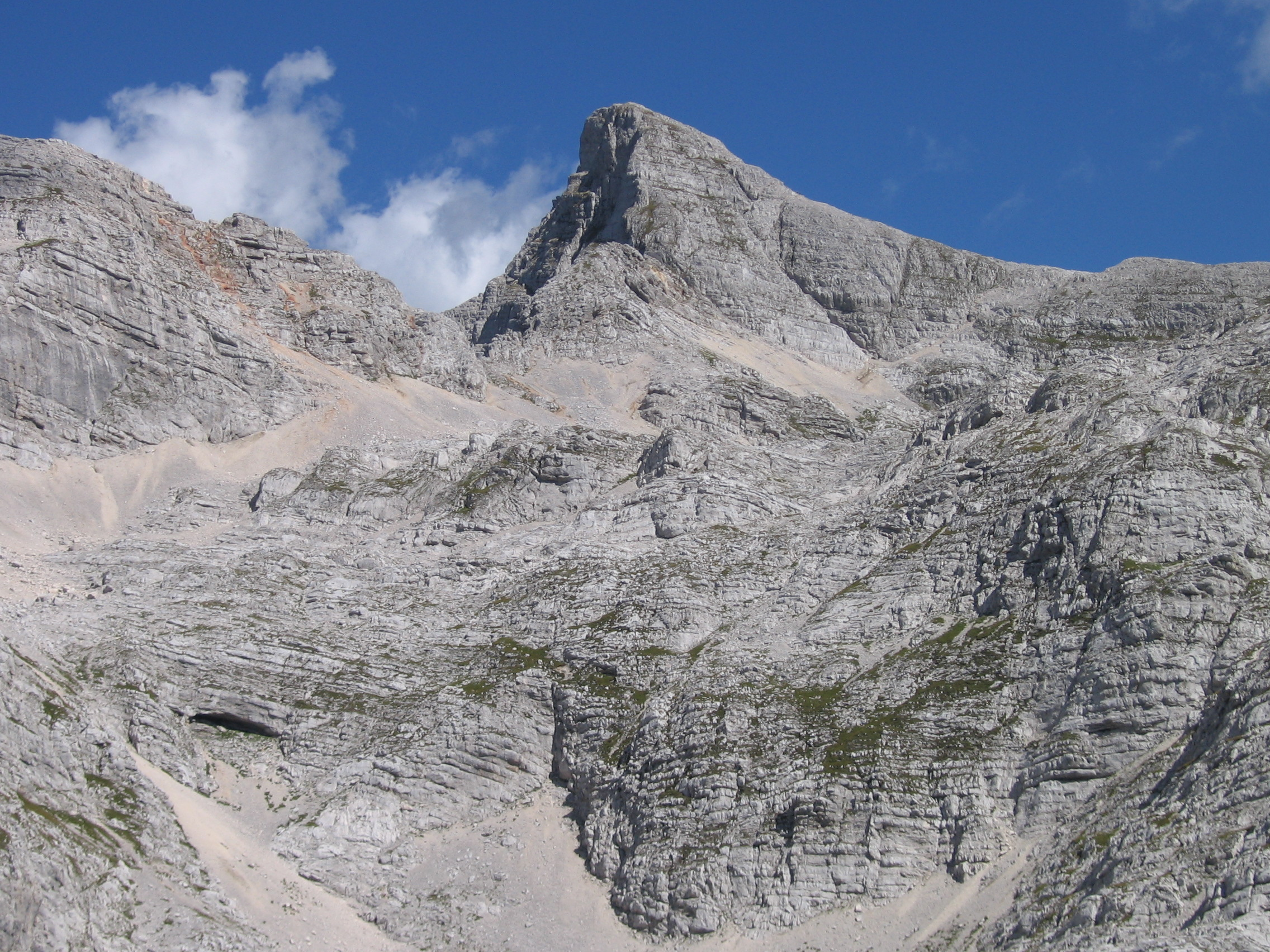
- Stenar from Kriški podi

Highest point
- Elevation: 2,244 m (7,362 ft)
- Prominence: 605 m (1,985 ft)
- Coordinates: 46°24′32.0754″N 13°49′15.5994″E

Geography
- Location within Slovenia
- Location: Slovenia
- Parent range: Julian Alps

Stenar (2501 m) is a mountain in Julian Alps in the Razor and Prisojnik group. The top of the mountain offers a good panoramic view of the surrounding mountains.

== Starting points ==
- Bovec, Zadnjica
- Kranjska gora, Krnica
- Kranjska gora, Vrata

== Routes ==
The route from Zadnjica is relatively easy to ascend; other routes are more challenging

- 4½h: from Aljažev dom v Vratih (1015 m), over Sovatna
- 5½h: from Koča v Krnici, over Križ
- 2h: from Bivaka Na Rušju (1980 m), over Stenarska vratca
- 2h: from Pogačnikov dom na Kriških podih (2050 m)

== See also ==
- Slovenian Mountain Hiking Trail
