= Aljaž Lodge in the Vrata Valley =

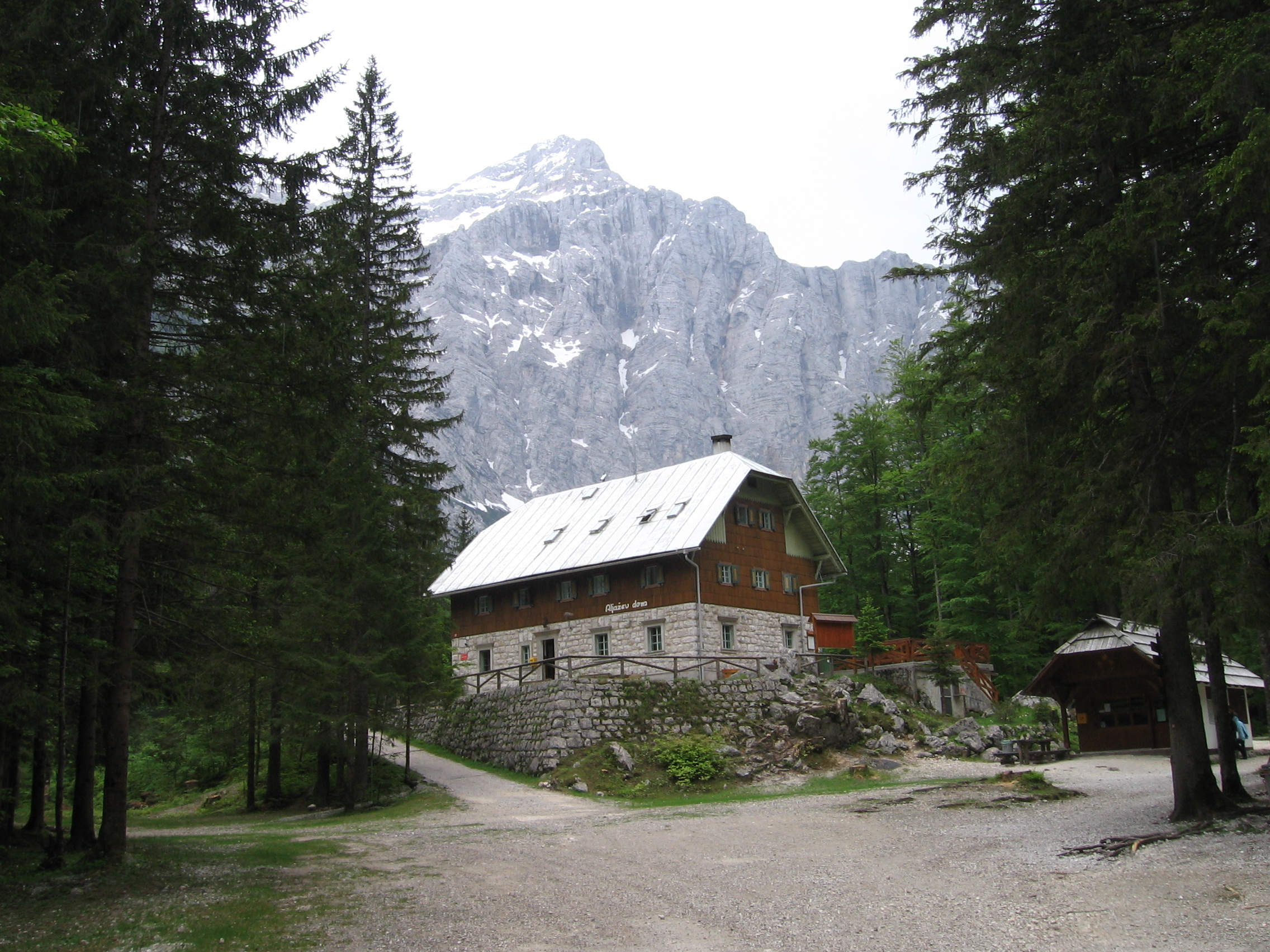

Highest point
- Elevation: 1,015 m (3,330 ft)
- Coordinates: 46°24′32.544″N 13°50′36.204″E

Naming
- Native name: Aljažev dom v Vratih (Slovene)

Geography
- Location within Slovenia
- Location: Slovenia
- Parent range: Julian Alps

Aljaž Lodge in the Vrata Valley (Slovene: Aljažev dom v Vratih; 1015 m a.s.l.) is a mountain hut that lies near the stream Triglav Bistrica in the upper end of the Vrata Valley. The hut is named after the Slovene priest and composer Jakob Aljaž (1845–1927), who in 1896 ordered the construction of the first wooden hut in the valley. The original Aljaž Lodge was built in 1904, and rebuilt in 1910 after the previous one was destroyed by an avalanche. Aljaž Lodge is the starting point to ascend the mountains Triglav, Škrlatica and Cmir.

== Starting point ==
- 12 km (2½h) from Mojstrana (Kranjska Gora)

== Neighbouring lodges ==
- 2½h: to Bivouac IV Lodge at the Rušje Plateau (1980 m)
- 4½h: to Valentin Stanič Lodge (2332 m), at Tominšek Route
- 5h: to Valentin Stanič Lodge (2332 m), at the Prag Route (Čez Prag)
- 4h: to Pogačnik Lodge at the Križ Plateau (2050 m) through the Sovatna Valley
- 5h: to the Triglav Lodge at Kredarica (2515 m), at Tominšek Route
- 5½h: to the Triglav Lodge at Kredarica (2515 m), at the Prag Route
- 6h: to the Dolič Lodge (2151 m) via Luknja Saddle

== Neighbouring mountains ==
- 5h: Bovec Mount Gamsovec (Bovški Gamsovec; 2392 m), over Luknja Saddle (Luknja; 1758 m)
- 4-5h: Cmir (2393 m), through the Valley Behind Cmir
- 4-5h: Dolek Spike (Dolkova špica; 2591 m), passing Bivouac IV Lodge on the Rušje Plateau
- 4½h: Stenar (2501 m), over the Dovje Pass (2180 m)
- 5-6h: Škrlatica (2740 m), passing Bivouac IV Lodge on the Rušje Plateau
- 6-7h: Triglav (2864 m), Bamberg Route, via the Plemenice Ridge

== See also ==
- Slovenian Mountain Hiking Trail
- Triglav National Park
