= Triglav Bistrica =

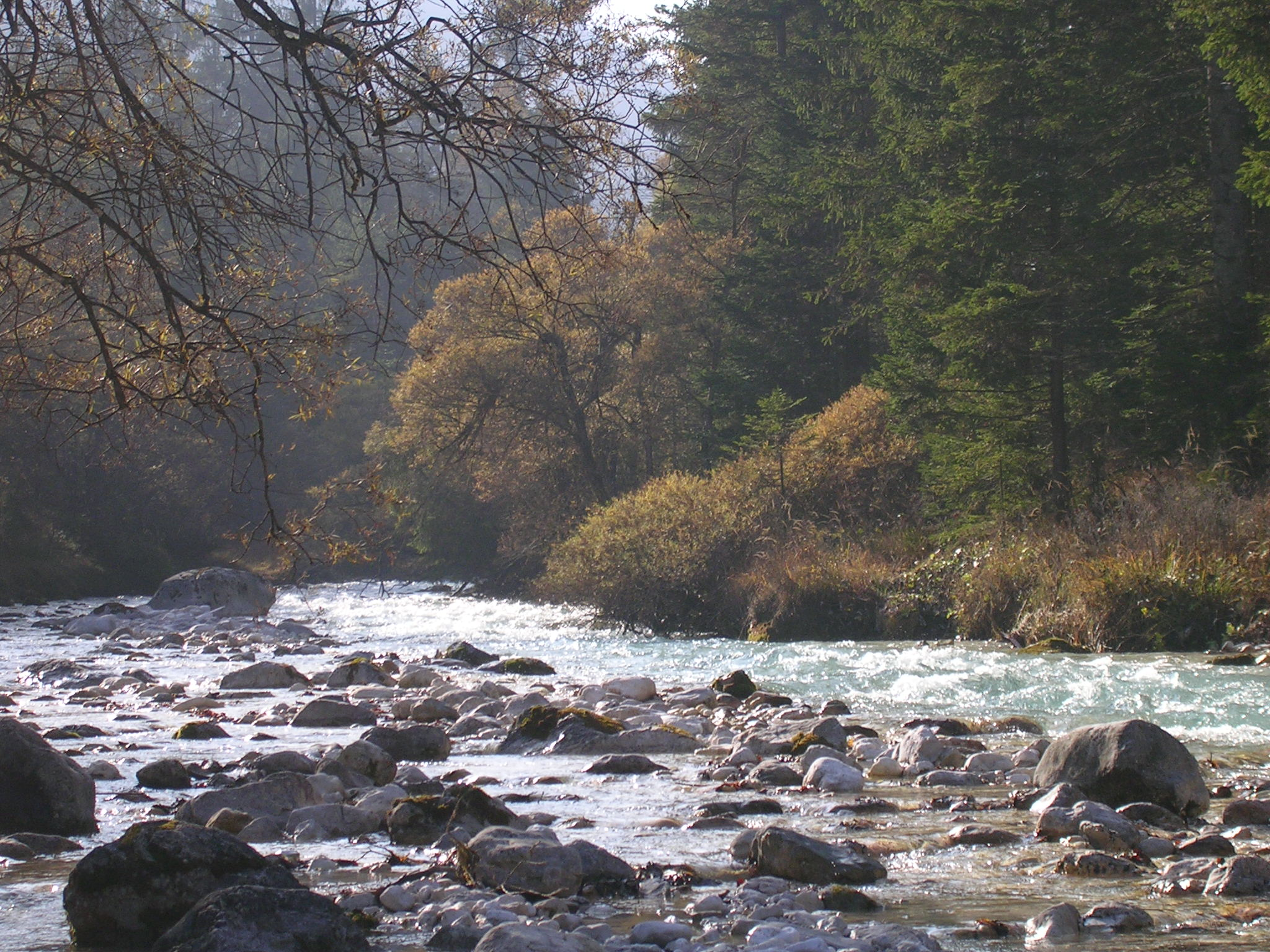
- Mist on the Triglav Bistrica

Location
- Country: Slovenia

Physical characteristics
- Source
  - location: Below the north face of Mount Triglav, Julian Alps
  - coordinates: 46°24′42″N 13°50′47″E
- Mouth
  - location: Sava Dolinka, near Mojstrana
  - coordinates: 46°27′45″N 13°56′40″E
- Length: 10 km (6.2 mi)

Basin features
- Progression: Sava→ Danube→ Black Sea

The Triglav Bistrica (Slovene: Triglavska Bistrica, also simply known as the Bistrica) is a stream that flows through the glacial Vrata Valley southwest of Mojstrana, Slovenia. Its source is below the north face of Mount Triglav in the blind Bukovlje Valley, and it flows past the Aljaž Lodge. In addition to several intermittent tributaries with a flashy character, it also has three constant tributaries, all of them flowing from valleys below the east slope of Mount Škrlatica: Dry Creek (Suhi potok), Red Creek (Rdeči potok), and Peričnik Creek. The Triglav Bistrica empties into the Sava Dolinka at Mojstrana. It falls 400 meters (1,300 ft) during its approximately 10-kilometer (6.2 mi) course.

== Palaeontology ==
In the upper reaches of the Vrata Valley, near Kozja Dnina, a sequence of pelagic limestones of Carnian age is exposed, this locality been known to paleontologists from the beginning of the 20th century and has produced a variety of excellently preserved fossils. These include bivalves, brachiopods, echinoids, crinoids, asteroids, ammonites, belemnites, scleractinian corals, shrimps, lobsters, fish and thylacocephalans.
