= Smrekovec Lodge =

- (Dom na Smrekovcu)
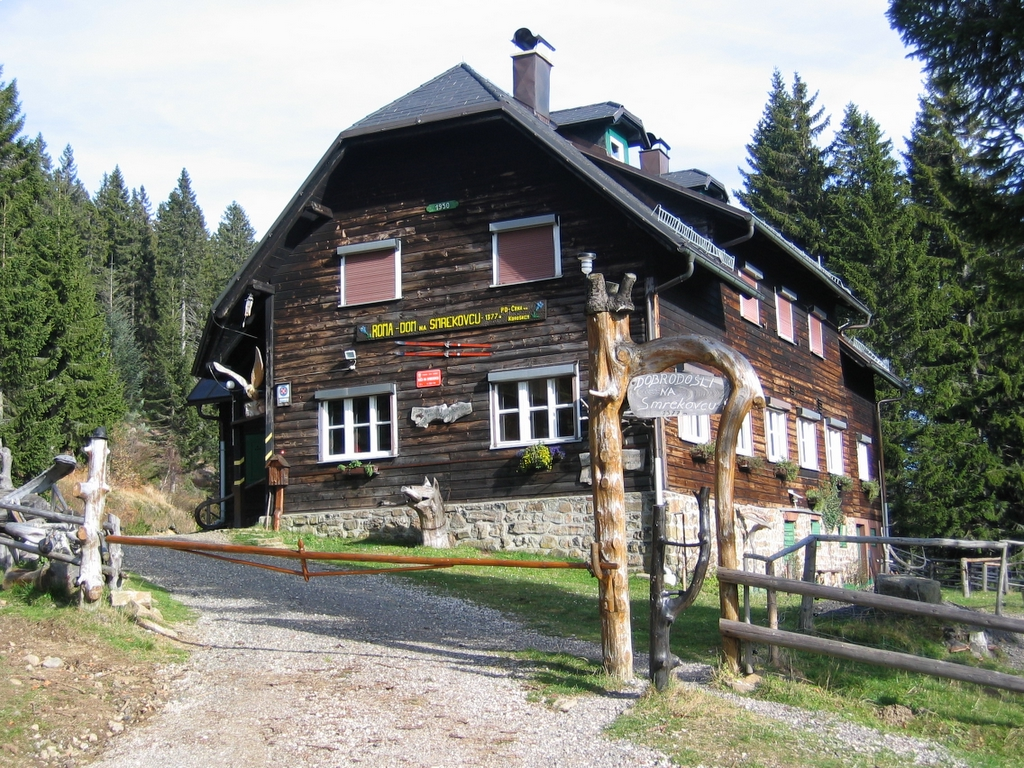

Highest point
- Elevation: 1,377 m (4,518 ft)
- Coordinates: 46°24′47.772″N 14°54′00″E

Geography
- Location within Slovenia
- Location: Slovenia
- Parent range: Kamnik-Savinja Alps

The Smrekovec Lodge (Slovene: Dom na Smrekovcu; 1,377 meters or 4,518 feet) is a mountain hostel on the southern slope of the Smrekovec Mountains (Smrekovško pogorje) in the Kamnik–Savinja Alps. The first lodge was built in 1933, but it was burned down during World War II. A new lodge was built in 1951, and expanded in 1976–77.

== Starting points ==
- 3h: from the town of Črna na Koroškem,
- 4½h: by car from the town of Šoštanj (26 km)
- 3½h: by car from the town of Ljubno ob Savinji (16 km)

== Neighbouring lodges ==
- 2½h: the Mozirje Lodge at Golte (Mozirska koča na Golteh; 1356 m)
- 5h: the Loka Lodge at Raduha (Koča na Loki pod Raduho; 1534 m), passing the Travnik Lodge (Koča na Travniku; 1548 m)
- 2½h: the Andrej Lodge at Sleme (Andrejev dom na Slemenu; 1086 m)
- 4½h: the Mount Ursula Lodge (Dom na Uršlji gori; 1680 m)

== Neighbouring mountains ==
- ½h: Smrekovec (1577 m)
- 2h: Komen (1684 m)

== See also ==
- Slovenian Mountain Hiking Trail
