= Bojtina =

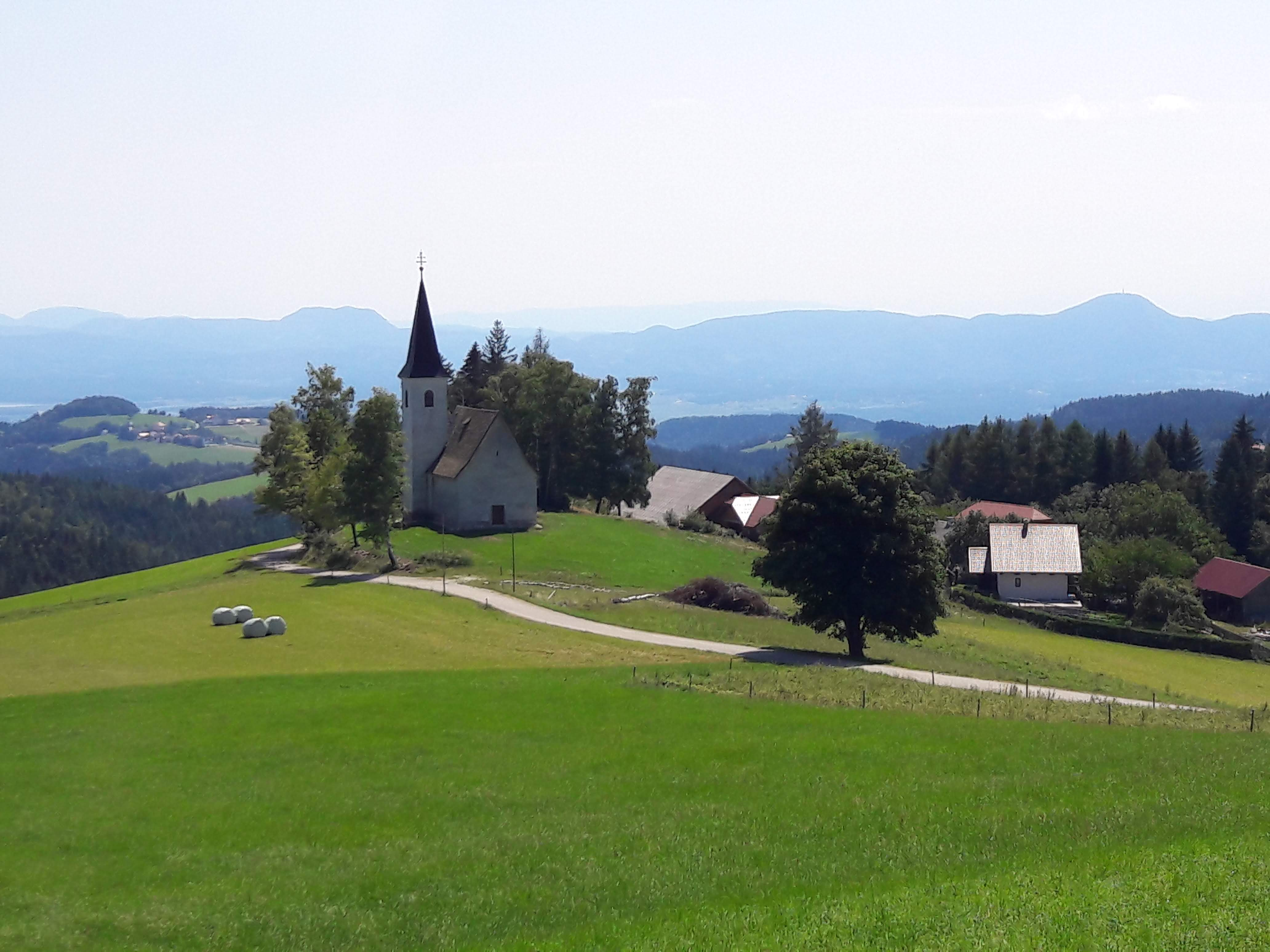

- Location in Slovenia
- Coordinates: 46°27′45.17″N 15°30′57.53″E
- Country: Slovenia
- Traditional region: Styria
- Statistical region: Drava
- Municipality: Slovenska Bistrica

Area
  - Total: 9.99 km^{2} (3.86 sq mi)
- Elevation: 858.2 m (2,816 ft)

Population (2002)
  - Total: 85

Bojtina (pronounced [ˈboːi̯tina]) is a dispersed settlement in the Pohorje Hills in the Municipality of Slovenska Bistrica in northeastern Slovenia. The area is part of the traditional region of Styria. It is now included with the rest of the municipality in the Drava Statistical Region.

The local church is dedicated to Saint Ursula and belongs to the Parish of Sveti Martin na Pohorju. It dates to the late 17th century.
