= Triglav Lodge at Kredarica =

Mountain hut in Slovenia

- Triglav Lodge in 2013

Highest point
- Elevation: 2,515 m (8,251 ft)
- Coordinates: 46°22′44.11″N 13°50′55.75″E

Naming
- Native name: Triglavski dom na Kredarici (Slovene)

Geography
- Location within Slovenia
- Location: Slovenia
- Parent range: Julian Alps

The Triglav Lodge at Kredarica (Slovene: Triglavski dom na Kredarici) (2,515 m) is the highest mountain hut in Slovenia and the highest meteorological station in the country. It stands on a small plateau just under the peak of Kredarica, an elevation in the ridge between Rjavina and Triglav. The Valentin Stanič Lodge (Dom Valentina Staniča) stands to the northeast below Begunje Peak (Begunjski vrh, 2,460 m), and the Planika Lodge at Triglav (Dom Planika pod Triglavom) stands to the south. In the vicinity there is also a chapel dedicated to Our Lady of the Snows, and a few metres away there is a small cave named Ivačič Cave.

== History ==
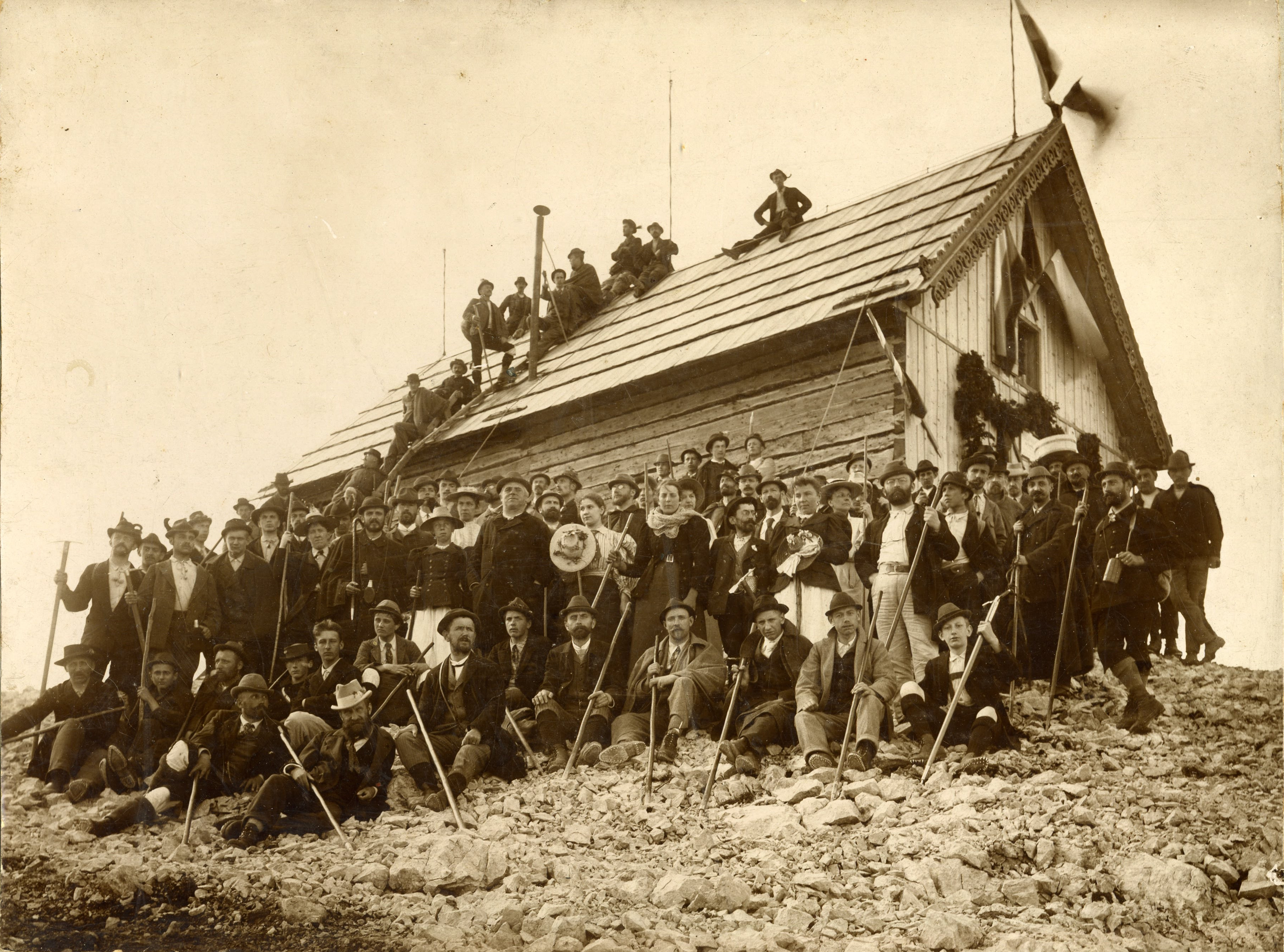
Opening of the lodge in 1896

The first hut, named the Triglav Hut (Triglavska koča), was built in 1896 at the initiative of Jakob Aljaž. Later it was expanded three times, and it is now one of the largest mountain lodges in Slovenia. It can accommodate 200 hikers or more. In 1909, the Ljubljana Matica Alpine Club expanded the hut and renamed it the Triglav Lodge (Triglavski dom). In 1954, it was expanded again due to the increased number of visits after World War II. It was expanded for the last time in 1983.

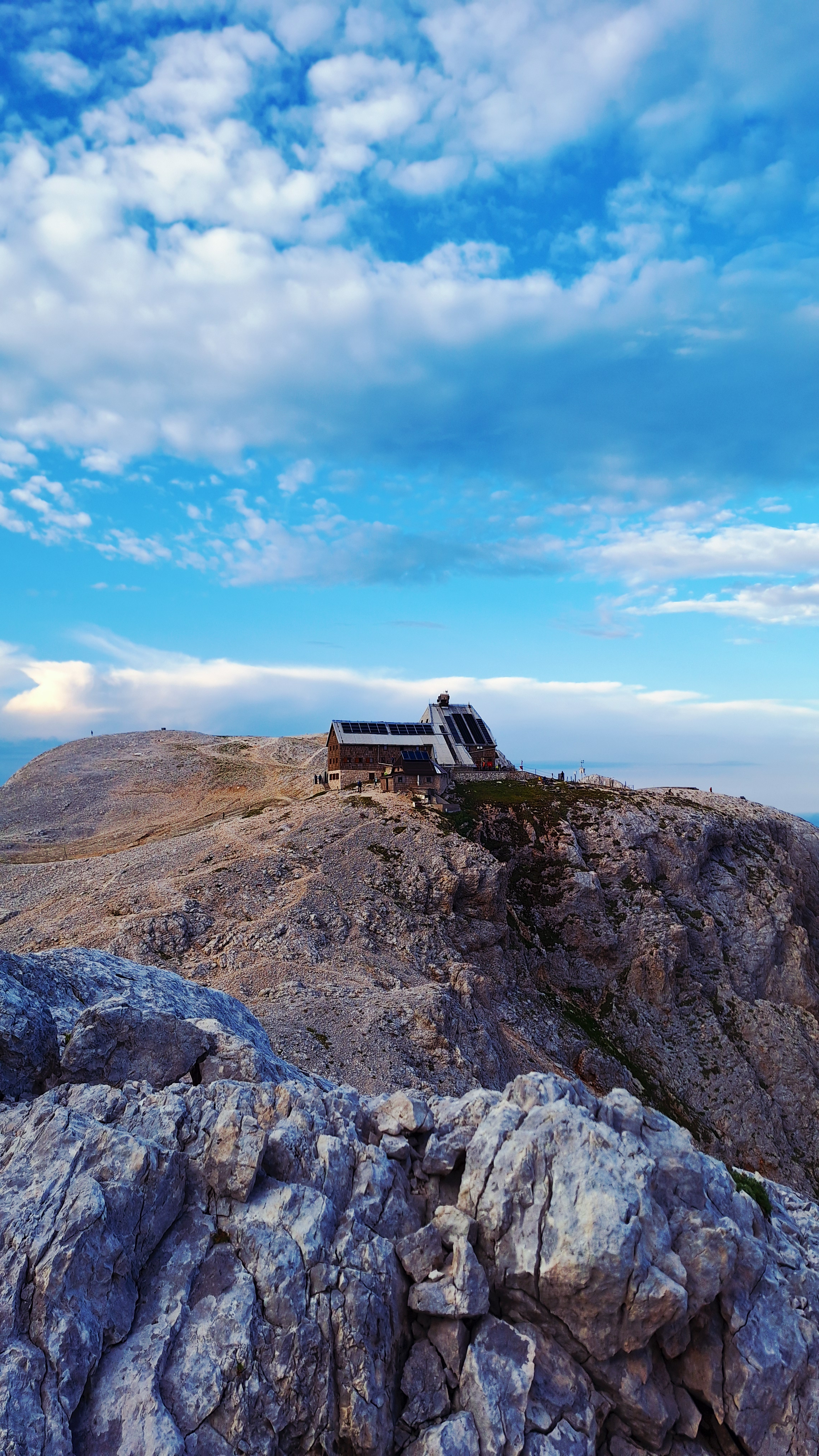
Mountain hut at Kredarica, Triglav

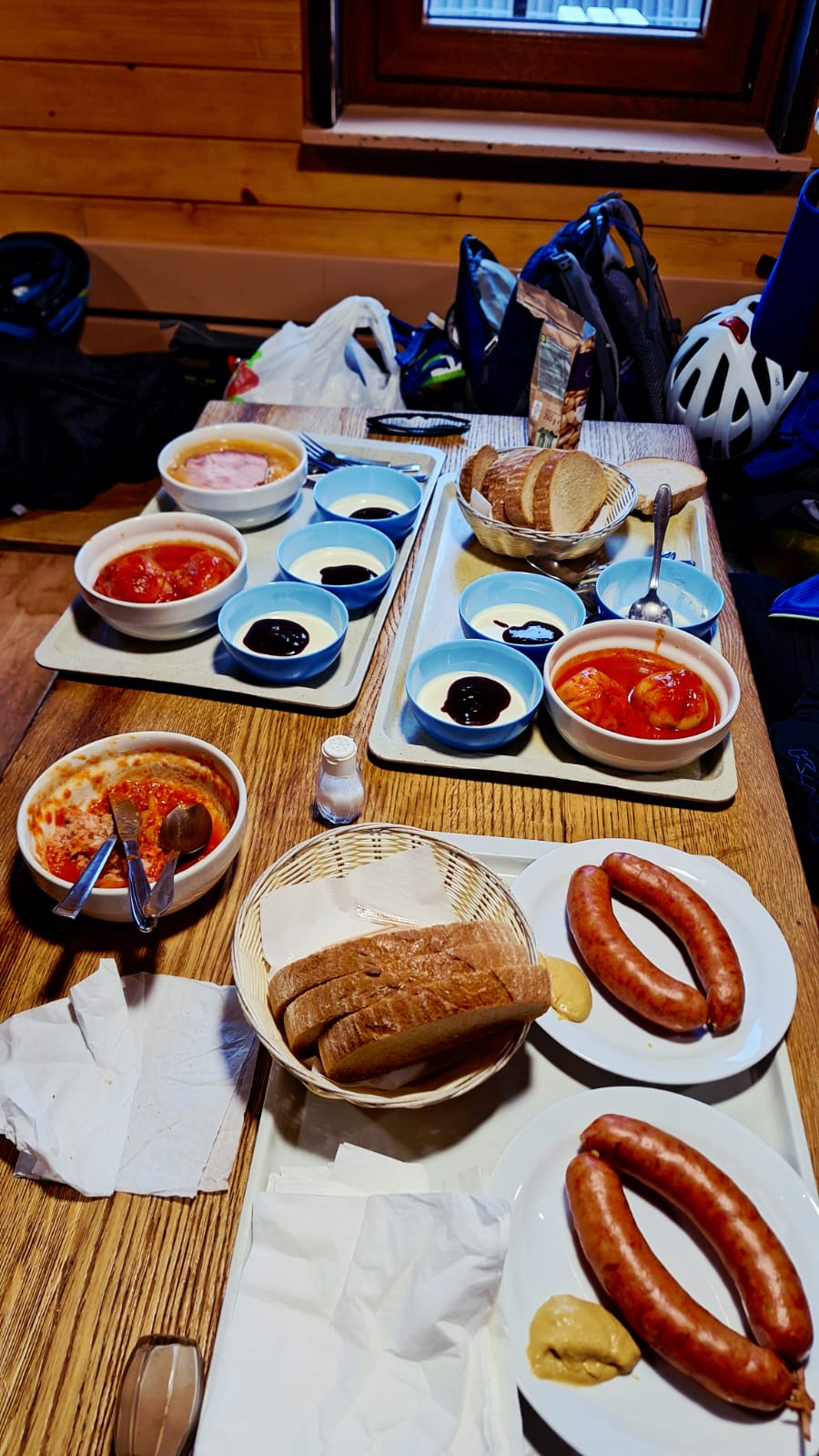
Food in Kredarica after descent

== Operation ==
The lodge is open to visitors all year round. Most visitors come from the end of June to the end of September. Outside the main season the residential meteorologists handle the visitors. The hut is managed by Ljubljana Matica Alpine Club. There is no cable car, and the hut is supplied by helicopters of the Slovenian Armed Forces.

The Ljubljana Matica Alpine Club's goal is to reduce the environmental impact of the hut. In 1992 they built a photovoltaic power station and in 1998 a small wind turbine. In 1992 they set up a base station and repaired the telephone line.

== Weather station ==
Few meteorological stations in Slovenia can boast a longer period of operation than the one at Kredarica. It was built to provide more accurate weather forecasts, seeing as most weather fronts approach Slovenia from the west, and high-altitude measurements give insights that weather stations in the lowlands cannot provide. Ideally, the station would have been placed on Triglav itself, as it is the most prominent peak. Given the available resources, the best compromise was to locate the meteorological station by the existing mountain house at Kredarica; the exact location of the instruments is 15m away from the building.

The first meteorological observations were made in 1897, the year after the hut opened. The state meteorological service contributed meteorological instruments, while the caretaker of the hut, Anton Pekovec, recorded observations, only in the summers when the cottage was open.

In the early 20th century observations were carried out at Kredarica by a few university graduate meteorologists, with the intention of turning the meteorological station into an observatory. These plans did not materialize due to a lack of personnel and financial resources. By the mid 20th century, observations at Kredarica were handled by trained meteorological observers who were willing and able to spend the harsh winters at the mountain huts, as snow and weather conditions would prevent descent into the valley for weeks at a time.

Measurements at Kredarica have been continuous since August 1954. For the first four months it was solely a climatic station, but since January 1955 it has been one of Slovenia's first-order weather stations with a wide range of recorded meteorological measurements and observations. Since September 1994, the meteorological station has been fully automated.

Due to the exceptional importance of the weather station at Kredarica, in the 21st century the Slovenian Armed Forces (SAF) have also become involved in meteorological observations. In 2005, the Slovenian Ministry of Defence and Environment Agency (ARSO) signed an agreement on monitoring the weather, snow structure and avalanches in the highlands. The SAF provides four meteorological observers and takes care of the helicopter transport of meteorologists to and from the weather station. Furthermore, in December 2020 the Chief of the General Staff, Robert Glavaš, and the Director General of ARSO, Iztok Slatinšek, signed a letter of intent to cooperate in the renovation and redevelopment of the facility at Kredarica.

Since the mountain hut is located within the bounds of a natural park, the surroundings do not vary much due to human causes over time. As such, observations from Kredarica are included in the Global Climate Observing System, the purpose of which is to continuously monitor climate conditions around the world with the help of data from only the most accurate and carefully selected of measuring sites.

Climate data for Kredarica, 1991–2020 normals, extremes 1951–2020
Month	Jan	Feb	Mar	Apr	May	Jun	Jul	Aug	Sep	Oct	Nov	Dec	Year
Record high °C (°F)	9.2 (48.6)	9.7 (49.5)	7.9 (46.2)	10.1 (50.2)	14.1 (57.4)	20.8 (69.4)	20.9 (69.6)	19.6 (67.3)	18.3 (64.9)	15.4 (59.7)	13 (55)	10.2 (50.4)	20.9 (69.6)
Mean daily maximum °C (°F)	−4.3 (24.3)	−4.9 (23.2)	−3.1 (26.4)	−0.6 (30.9)	3.3 (37.9)	7.5 (45.5)	10.0 (50.0)	10.2 (50.4)	6.3 (43.3)	3.7 (38.7)	−0.5 (31.1)	−3.5 (25.7)	2.0 (35.6)
Daily mean °C (°F)	−7 (19)	−7.9 (17.8)	−5.9 (21.4)	−3.1 (26.4)	1.1 (34.0)	5.0 (41.0)	7.2 (45.0)	7.5 (45.5)	3.6 (38.5)	0.9 (33.6)	−3 (27)	−6.2 (20.8)	−0.7 (30.8)
Mean daily minimum °C (°F)	−9.5 (14.9)	−10.6 (12.9)	−8.4 (16.9)	−5.3 (22.5)	−0.9 (30.4)	2.8 (37.0)	4.9 (40.8)	5.3 (41.5)	1.4 (34.5)	−1.5 (29.3)	−5.3 (22.5)	−8.6 (16.5)	−3.0 (26.6)
Record low °C (°F)	−28.3 (−18.9)	−28.1 (−18.6)	−28.2 (−18.8)	−20.5 (−4.9)	−15.7 (3.7)	−9.7 (14.5)	−6 (21)	−6 (21)	−9.9 (14.2)	−18.3 (−0.9)	−21.2 (−6.2)	−26.2 (−15.2)	−28.3 (−18.9)
Average precipitation mm (inches)	89 (3.5)	96 (3.8)	121 (4.8)	141 (5.6)	162 (6.4)	206 (8.1)	218 (8.6)	206 (8.1)	236 (9.3)	236 (9.3)	216 (8.5)	131 (5.2)	2,058 (81.2)
Average snowfall cm (inches)	110 (43)	139 (55)	154 (61)	152 (60)	83 (33)	21 (8.3)	4 (1.6)	4 (1.6)	35 (14)	63 (25)	154 (61)	157 (62)	1,076 (425.5)
Average extreme snow depth cm (inches)	185 (73)	228 (90)	274 (108)	305 (120)	236 (93)	78 (31)	3 (1.2)	0.1 (0.0)	3 (1.2)	13 (5.1)	61 (24)	138 (54)	305 (120)
Average precipitation days (≥ 0.1 mm)	12	11	14	16	18	17	17	16	14	14	15	12	176
Average snowy days (≥ 1 cm)	10	10	12	14	10	4	1	1	4	7	12	11	96
Mean monthly sunshine hours	117	118	138	131	148	149	164	148	119	126	98	109	1,565
Source: Slovenian Environment Agency (ARSO)

== Starting points ==
- from Aljaž Lodge in the Vrata Valley via the Tominšek Route (Tominškova pot) 4 h (a very challenging route)
- from Aljaž Lodge in the Vrata Valley via the Over the Rock Step (Čez Prag) Route 3 h 30 min (challenging)
- from the Kot Valley 5 h
- from the Krma Valley 3 h 30 min (easy)
- from the Rudno Polje Alp (Rudno polje) passing Vodnik Lodge at Big Field Pasture (Vodnikov dom na Velem polju), over Horse Pass (Konjsko sedlo) and Calvary Pass (Kalvarija) 5 h (challenging)

== Mountains ==
- Triglav (2864 m; a challenging secured route) 1 h

== See also ==
- Slovenian Mountain Hiking Trail
