= Triglav Lakes Lodge =

Mountain lodge in Slovenia

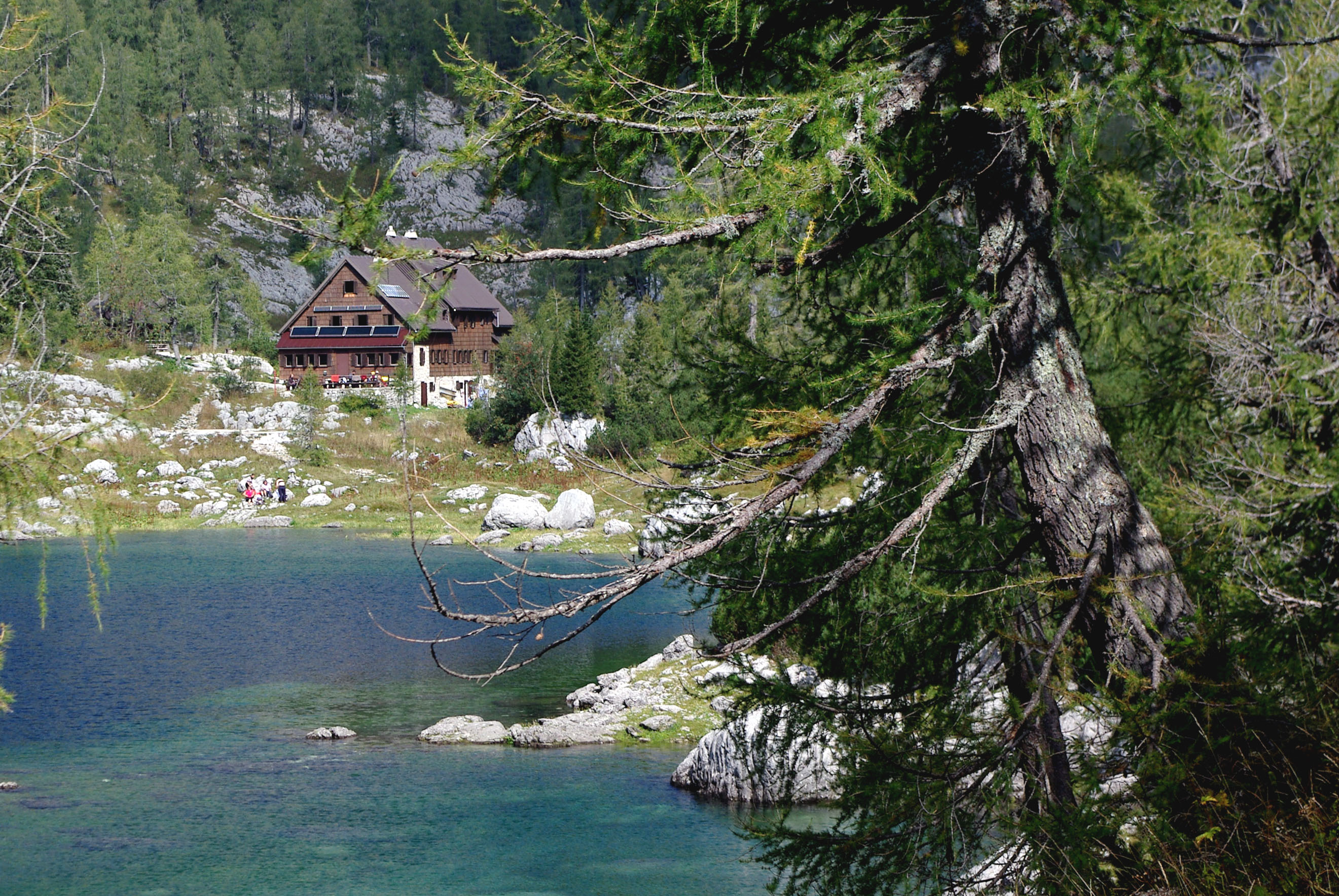

Highest point
- Elevation: 1,685 m (5,528 ft)
- Coordinates: 46°19′7″N 13°46′46″E

Naming
- Native name: Koča pri Triglavskih jezerih (Slovene)

Geography
- Location within Slovenia
- Location: Slovenia
- Parent range: Julian Alps

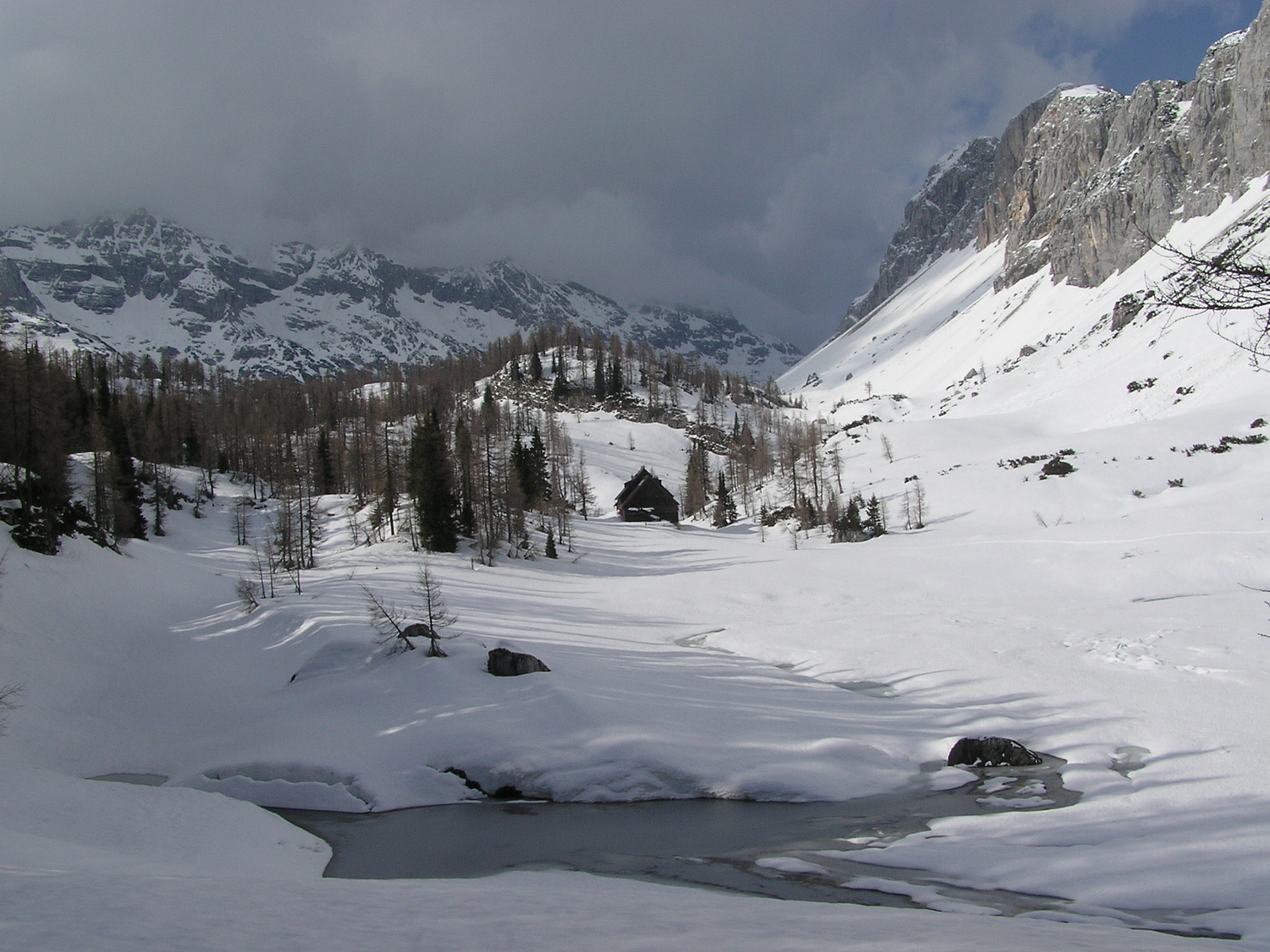
The Triglav Lakes Lodge in the winter, Double Lake in front

The Triglav Lakes Lodge (Slovene: Koča pri Triglavskih jezerih) (1685 m) is a mountain lodge between Double Lake (Dvojno jezero) and the artificial Lake Močivec (jezero Močivec) below Mount Tičarica in the heart of the Julian Alps, northwestern Slovenia. The first structure was built in 1880 by an Austrian hiking club. In 1955 and 1988, it was rebuilt and expanded. It has four dining rooms with 150 seats, 13 rooms with 30 beds, and 13 larger sleeping rooms with 170 bunks. The lodge is open from the end of June until the start of October

== Starting points ==
- 3 h from the Savica Lodge via Komarča
- 6 h From the village of Stara Fužina via Vogar and the Dedno Polje Alp
- 5½ h Soča via the Velika Vrata

== Neighbouring mountains ==
- 1 h Mala Tičarica (2071 m) 1 h
- 2½ h Big Mount Špičje (2398 m)
- 3½ h Zelnarica (2320 m) 3–4 h

== See also ==
- Slovenian Mountain Hiking Trail
