= Maribor Lodge =

Historic mountain hut in Pohorje, Slovenia

Mariborska koča
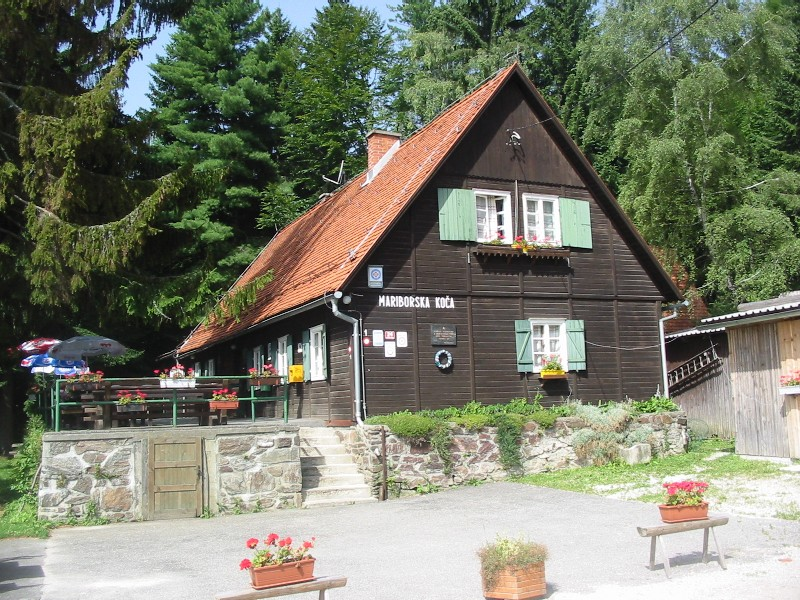

Highest point
- Elevation: 1,142 m (3,747 ft)
- Coordinates: 46°30′5.4″N 15°33′19.80″E

Geography
- Location within Slovenia
- Location: Slovenia
- Parent range: Pohorje

Mariborska koča (1142 m) is a mountain hut, which lies on small plain, on southern part of Pohorje under Reški vrh and Ledinek kogl. It was built in 1911 and was burnt by Germans during WW2.

== Starting points ==
- By road from Hoče-Areh
- By cable car from Maribor

== Neighbouring hills ==
- ½h : Mariborski razglednik (1147 m)
- ¾h : Bolfenk (1044 m)
- 1h : Ruška koča pri Arehu (1246m)

== See also ==
- Slovenian Mountain Hiking Trail
