= Planika Lodge at Triglav =

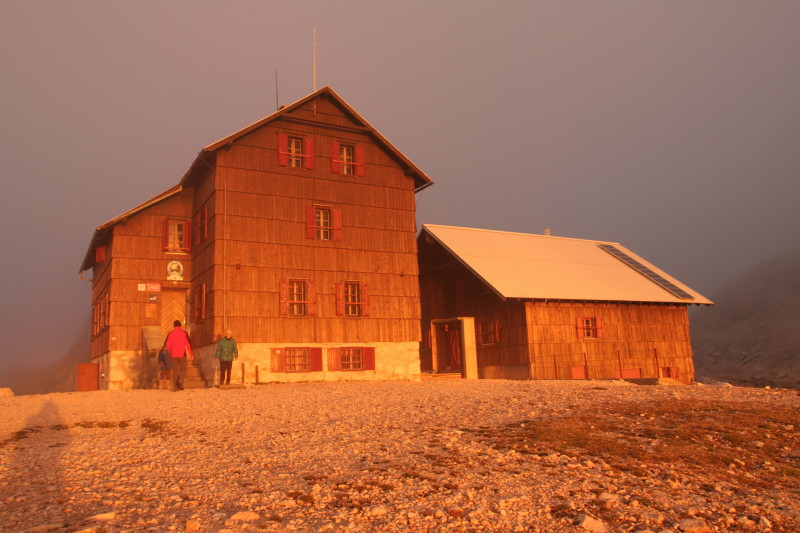

Highest point
- Elevation: 2,401 m (7,877 ft)
- Coordinates: 46°22′17.544″N 13°50′45.780″E

Naming
- Native name: Dom Planika pod Triglavom (Slovene)

Geography
- Location within Slovenia
- Location: Slovenia
- Parent range: Julian Alps

The Planika Lodge at Triglav (Slovene: Dom Planika pod Triglavom; 2401 m) is a mountain hut, which lies on the Ledine plains on the southern side of Mount Triglav. The First hut, also called the Triglav Tempe (Triglavski tempelj), was built on 18 September 1871. In 1877, the Austro-German hiking club built a hut called the Maria Theresa Hut (German: Maria Theresia-Hütte; Slovene: Koča Marije Terezije). On 13 August 1911, there was another building added called the Maria Theresa Lodge (Dom Marije Terezije). After World War I, the Slovenian Hiking club took over the hut and renamed it the Aleksander Lodge (Aleksandrov dom). The hut was transformed to a border garrison Karaula for a while. In 1945, the Gorje Hiking Club (PD Gorje) renamed it to Planika Lodge at Triglav. In 1987, Karaula was demolished and a bigger annex was built at its place on 19 August 1992.

== Starting points ==
- 5½ h: from the Metalworker's Lodge in the Krma Valley (870 m), over Horse Saddle (Konjsko sedlo)
- 2 h: from the Tarvisio Lodge at Dolič (Tržaška koča na Doliču; 2,151 m)
- 2 h: from the Vodnik Lodge at Big Field Pasture (Vodnikov dom na Velem polju; 1,817 m)

== Neighbouring huts ==
- 1 h: to Triglav Lodge at Kredarica (2,515 m)

== Neighbouring mountains ==
- 1½ h: Triglav (2,864 m), over Little Mount Triglav (Mali Triglav; 2,725 m)
- 1½ h: Triglav (2,864 m), over Triglav Notch Saddle (Triglavska škrbina; 2,659 m)

== See also ==
- Slovenian Mountain Hiking Trail
