= Slovenian Mountain Hiking Trail =

Hiking trail in Slovenia

The Slovenian Mountain Hiking Trail (Slovene: Slovenska planinska pot), sometimes also called Transverzala (Long-Distance Trail), is a route from Maribor to Ankaran. It covers most of the Slovenian mountain areas including Pohorje, the Julian Alps, the Kamnik-Savinja Alps, the Karawanks, and the southwestern part of Slovenia.

== History ==
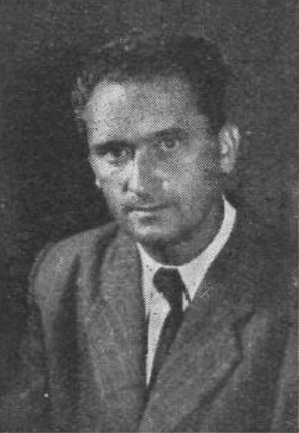
Ivan Šumljak, 1959

The idea of connecting the most beautiful, hilly, and mountainous area in Slovenia came from Ivan Šumljak in 1950. Originally, the trail was meant to be a circular route, which would start and end in Maribor. It was later changed to include Postojna and other areas towards the sea. It mostly included existing hiking trails. However, in some shorter parts it was necessary to make new demarcations to connect them.

The trail opened on August 1, 1953, with 80 control points. Since then, the trail has only changed slightly. These are the trail's current features: Control points: 80; Length: 599 km; Total ascent: 45.2 km; Total descent: 45.5 km.

There are 58 huts and two museums — the Slovene Alpine Museum in Mojstrana, and Franja Partisan Hospital (from World War II) — and the cave system named Škocjan Caves.

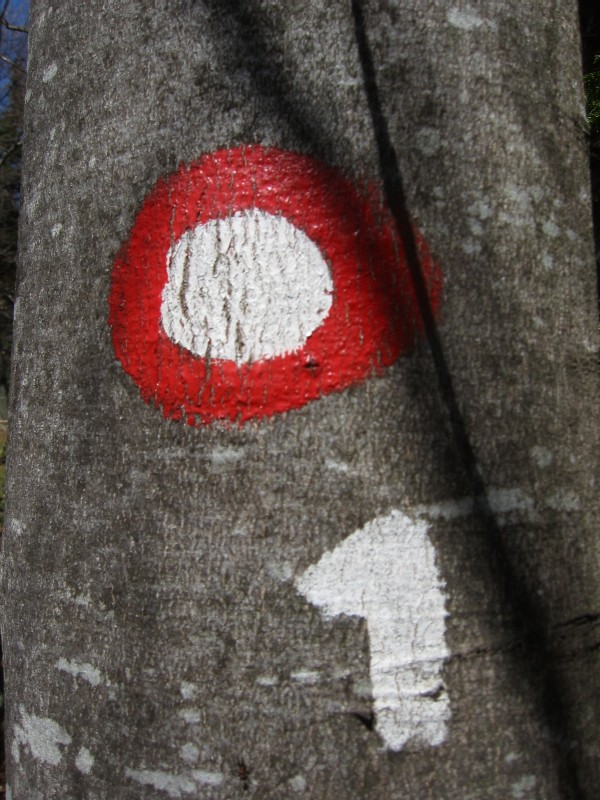
Knafelc blaze

The first guided tour of Slovenski planinski transverzali was conducted in 1958. About 9500 hikers have completed the route over 60 years of the trail's history.

The Slovenian Mountain Hiking Trail also has an extended route with 42 control points throughout Slovenia.

== Route ==
It is possible to start in Maribor, Ankaran, or anywhere else on the circular route. Hikers must obtain a book from the Alpine Association of Slovenia in which they will be able to collect stamps that are located on mountain tops or huts along the way. If no stamp is available, a photo also counts. The hiking is not time limited.

The route consists mainly of easy trails, but there are also some more challenging ones.

=== Pohorje and northeastern area ===
The control points of the trail on the Pohorje Plateau and in northeastern Slovenia are:

- Maribor Lodge (Mariborska koča; 1068 m)
- Ruše Lodge (Ruška koča) near Areh (1246 m); Šumik Falls (1030 m)
- Klopni Vrh Lodge (Koča na Klopnem vrhu; 1280 m)
- Pesek Lodge (Koča na Pesku; 1386 m); Lakes Lovrenc
- Ribnica Lodge (Ribniška koča; 1507 m); Black Peak (Črni vrh; 1543 m)
- Grmovšek Lodge at Big Kopa (1371 m)
- Kremžar Peak Lodge (Koča pod Kremžarjevim vrhom; 1102 m); Slovenj Gradec
- Postman's Lodge Below Plešivec (Poštarska koča pod Plešivcem; 805 m)
- Mount St. Ursula Lodge (Dom na Uršlji gori; 1670 m)
- Andrej Lodge at Sleme (Andrejev dom na Slemenu; 1096 m)

=== Kamnik–Savinja Alps ===
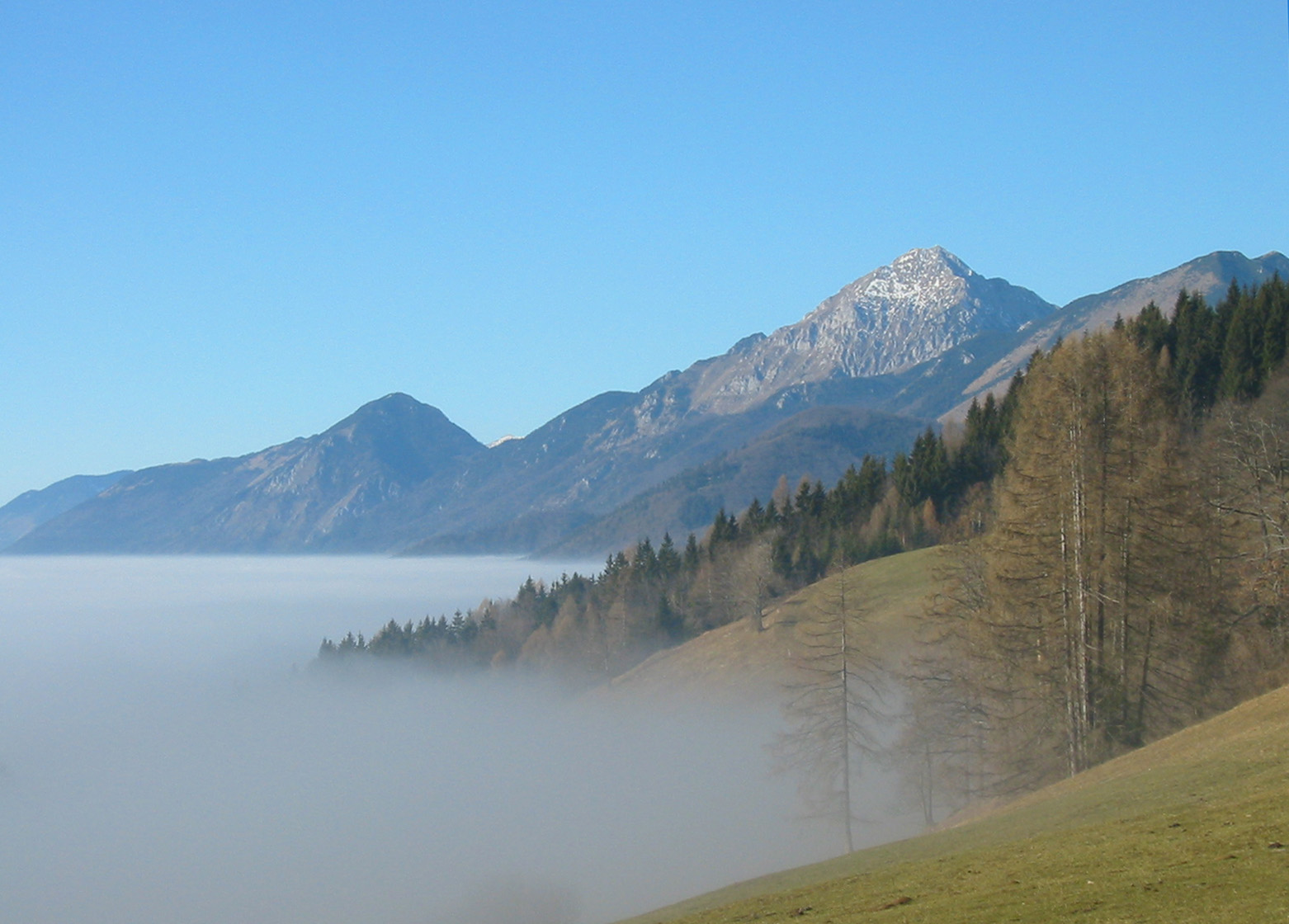
Kamnik Alps, Storžič

The control points of the trail in the Kamnik–Savinja Alps (northern Slovenia) are:

- Smrekovec Lodge (Dom na Smrekovcu; 1377 m); Koča na Travniku (1548 m)
- Loka Lodge at Raduha (Koča na Loki pod Raduho; 1520 m)
- Big Mount Raduha (2062 m)
- Grohat Lodge at Raduha (Koča na Grohatu pod Raduho; 1460 m); Rogovilc Inn (Gostišče Rogovilc; 610 m)
- Kocbek Lodge at Korošica (Kocbekov dom na Korošici; 1808 m)
- Ojstrica (2350 m)
- Kamnik Saddle Lodge (Koča na Kamniškem sedlu; (1864 m)
- Mount Turska (Turska gora; 2251 m)
- Skuta (2532 m)
- Zois Lodge at Kokra Saddle (Cojzova koča na Kokrskem sedlu; 1793 m)
- Grintovec (2558 m)
- Kočna (2540 m)
- Czech Lodge at Spodnje Ravni (Češka koča na Spodnjih Ravneh; 1543 m); Jezersko (880 m)
- Kališče Hiking Lodge (Planinski dom na Kališču; 1534 m)
- Storžič (2132 m)
- Storžič Lodge (Dom pod Storžičem; 1123 m); Fat Peak (Tolsti vrh; 1715 m)
- Mount Križe Lodge (Koča na Kriški gori; 1471 m); Tržič (515 m)
- Dobrča Lodge (Koča na Dobrči; 1478 m); Preval (1311 m)

=== Karawanks ===
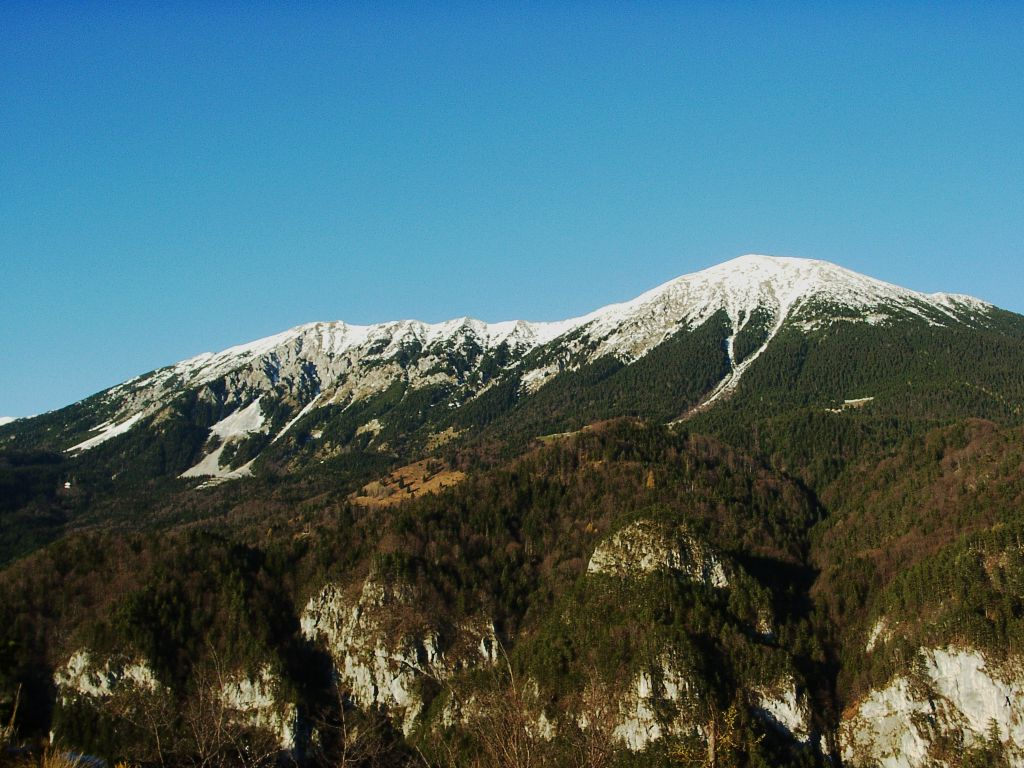
Stol

The control points of the trail in the Kamnik–Savinja Alps (northern Slovenia) are:

- Begunjščica (2060 m)
- Roblek Lodge at Begunjščica (Roblekov dom na Begunjščici; 1657 m)
- Zelenica Lodge (Planinski dom na Zelenici; 1536 m)
- Prešeren Lodge at Stol (Prešernova koča na Stolu; 2174 m); Golica Lodge (Koča na Golici; 1582 m)
- Golica (1836 m)

=== Julian Alps ===
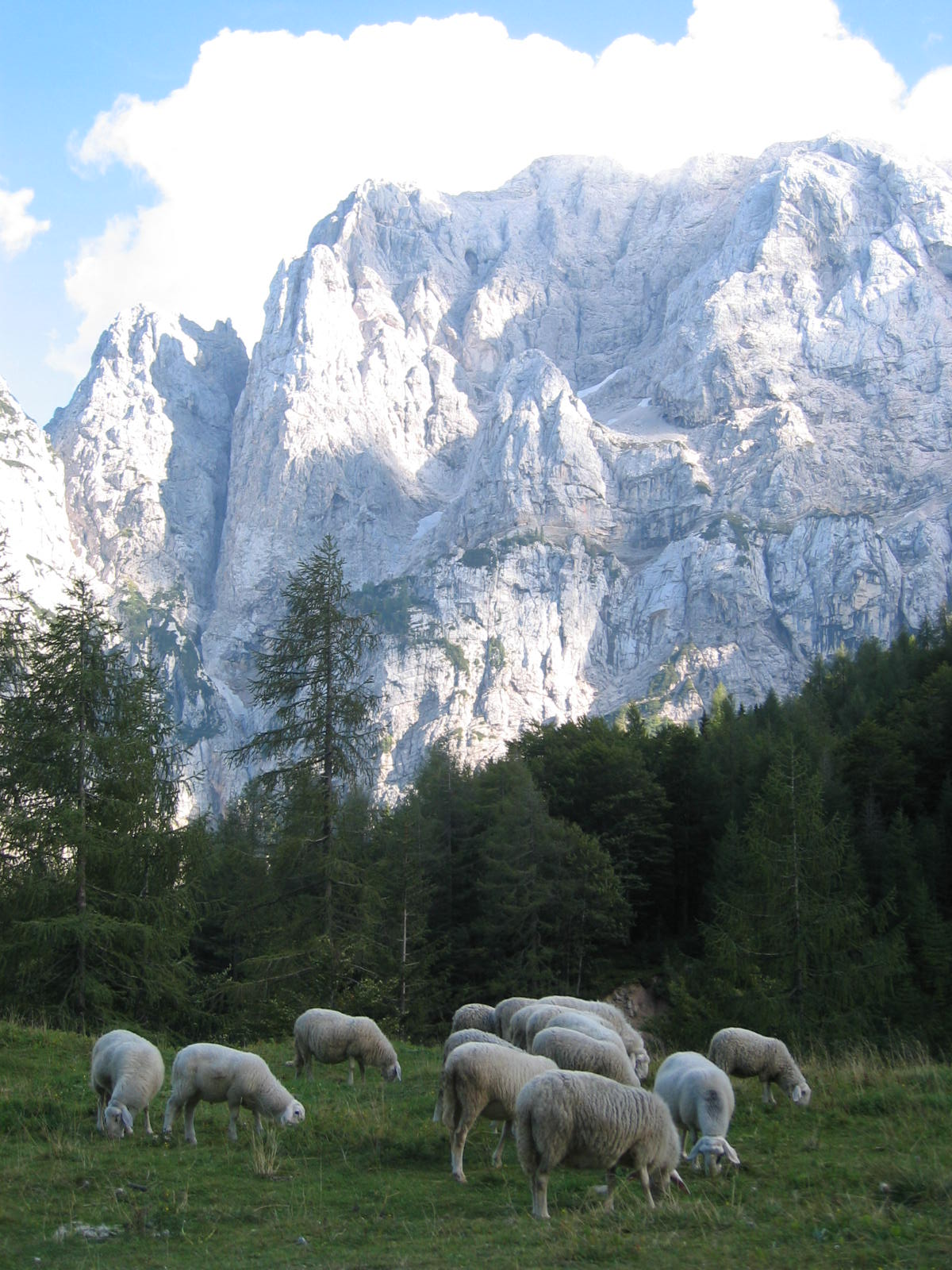
Prisojnik, from Erjavec Lodge at Vršič

The control points of the trail in the Kamnik–Savinja Alps (northern Slovenia) are:

- Slovenian Alpine Museum (641 m); Mojstrana (641 m)
- Aljaž Lodge in the Vrata Valley (Aljažev dom v Vratih; 1015 m)
- Valentin Stanič Lodge (Dom Valentina Staniča; 2332 m) below Triglav
- Triglav Lodge at Kredarica (Triglavski dom na Kredarici; 2515 m)
- Triglav (2864 m)
- or Planika Lodge at Triglav (Dom Planika pod Triglavom; 2404 m) or Trieste Lodge at Dolič (Tržaška koča na Doliču; 2151 m); Hole (Luknja; 1758 m); Bovec Mount Gamsovec (Bovški Gamsovec; 2392 m)
- Pogačnik Lodge at the Križ Plateau (Pogačnikov dom na Kriških podih; 2052 m)
- Razor (2601 m)
- Prisojnik (2547 m)
- Vršič Pass — Postman's Lodge at Vršič (Poštarski dom na Vršiču; 1688 m) or Tičar Lodge at Vršič (Tičarjev dom na Vršiču; 1620 m) or Erjavec Lodge at Vršič (Erjavčeva koča na Vršiču; 1515 m)
- Špiček Shelter (Zavetišče pod Špičkom; 2064 m)
- Jalovec (2645 m)
- Soča Spring Lodge (Koča pri izviru Soče; 886 m)
- Central Sava Valley at Prehodavci (Zasavska koča na Prehodavcih; 2071 m)
- Triglav Lakes Lodge (Koča pri Triglavskih jezerih; 1685 m)
- Komna — Komna Lodge (Dom na Komni; 1520 m) or Bogatin Lodge (Koča pod Bogatinom; 1513 m)
- Lakes Krn Lodge (Planinski dom pri Krnskih jezerih; 1385 m)
- Gomišček Lodge at Krn (Gomiščkovo zavetišče na Krnu; 2182 m)
- Razor Pasture Lodge (Koča na planini Razor; 1315 m)
- Vogel (1922 m)
- Rodica (1966 m)
- Zorko Jelinčič Lodge at Črna Prst (Dom Zorka Jelinčiča na Črni prsti; 1835 m); Petrovo Brdo (803 m)
- Andrej Žvan a.k.a. "Boris" Lodge at Porezen (Dom Andreja Žvana-Borisa na Poreznu; 1590 m)
- Franja Partisan Hospital (Partizanska bolnica Franja; 536 m)

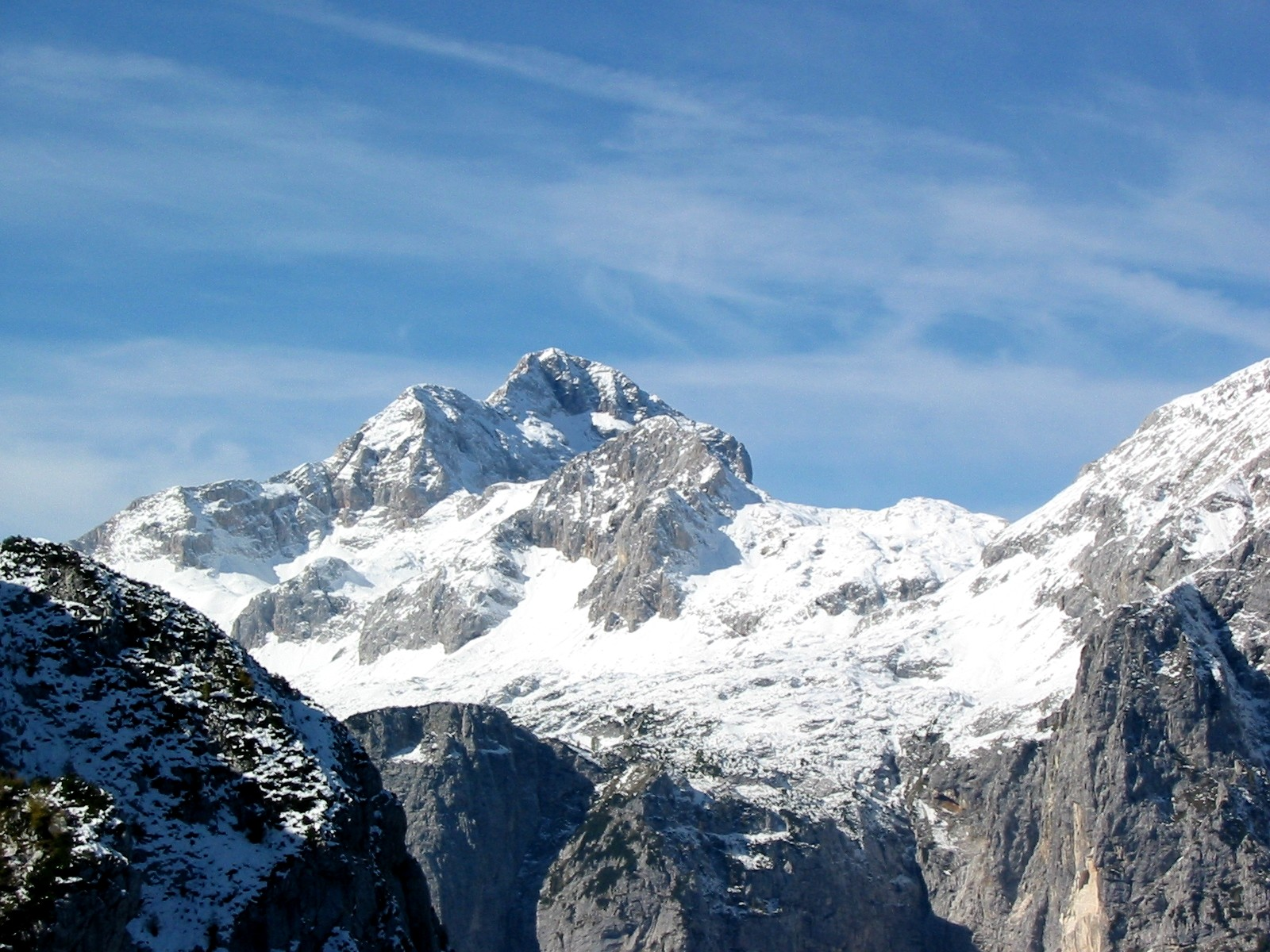
Triglav from Debela Peč

=== Southwestern area ===
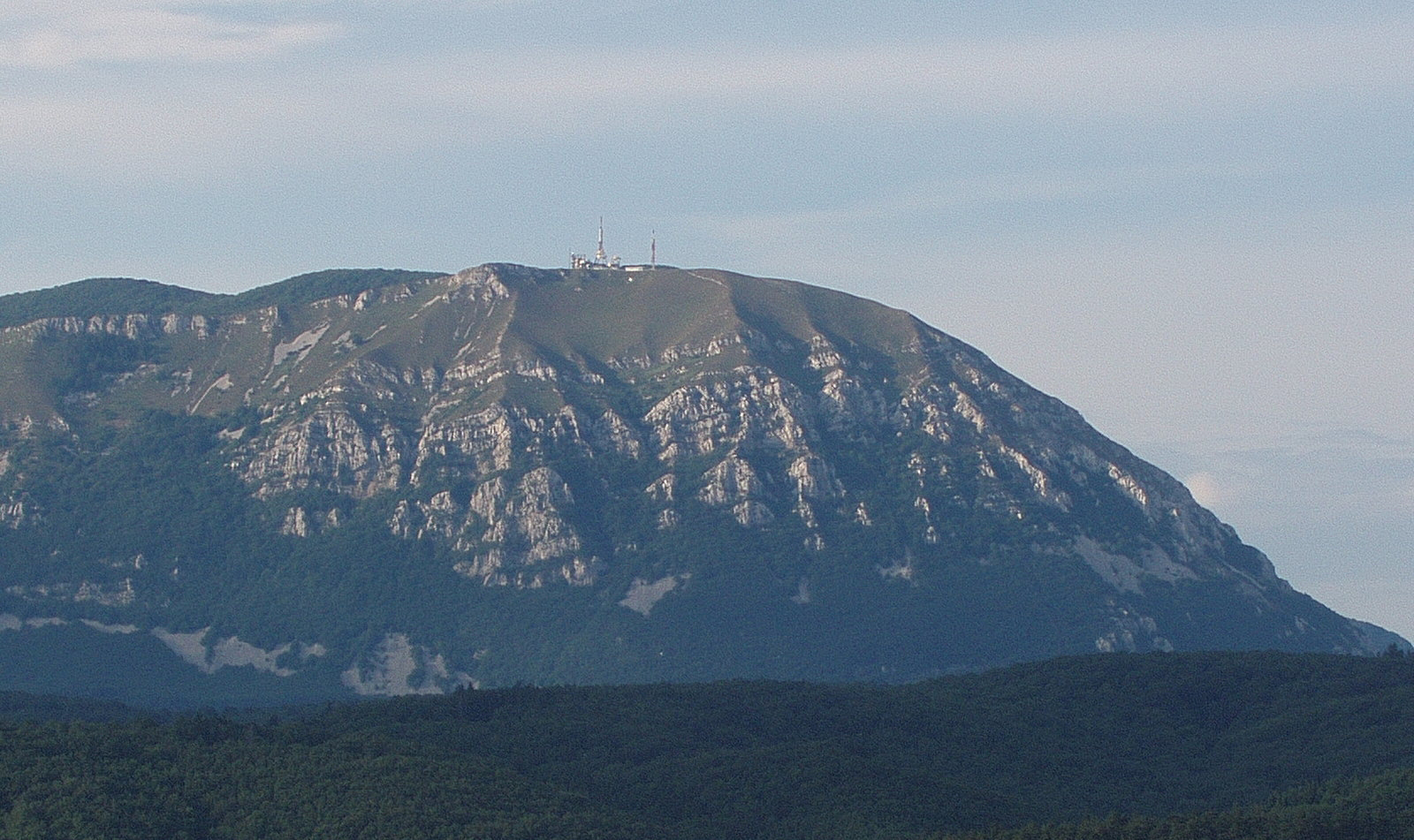
Nanos

The control points of the trail in southwestern Slovenia are:

- Ermanovec Lodge (Planinska koča na Ermanovcu; 964 m)
- Bevk Peak (Bevkov vrh; 1051 m)
- Sivka — Cold Peak (Mrzli vrh; 1008 m); Idrija (325 m)
- Hleviše Pasture Lodge (Koča na Hleviški planini; 818 m): Vojsko (1077m)
- Little Golak (Mali Golak; 1495 m); Iztok Lodge at Golaki (Iztokova koča pod Golaki; 1260 m)
- Anton Bavčer Lodge at Čaven (Koča Antona Bavčerja na Čavnu; 1242 m)
- Azure Peak (Sinji vrh; 1002 m); Col (619 m)
- Pirnat Lodge at Javornik (Pirnatova koča na Javorniku; 1156 m); Podkraj (797 m)
- Furlan Shelter at Abram (Furlanovo zavetišče pri Abramu; 900 m)
- Vojko Lodge at Nanos (Vojkova koča na Nanosu; 1201 m); Razdrto (577 m); Senožeče (580 m)
- Vremščica (1026 m);
- Matavun — Škocjan Caves (Škocjanske jame; 393 m); Artviže (817 m); Markovščina (567 m)
- Tuma Lodge at Slavnik (Tumova koča na Slavniku; 1028 m); Prešnica (480 m)
- Socerb (389 m)
- Tinjan (374 m)
- Ankaran (19 m)

=== Old control points ===
- Frischauf Lodge at Okrešelj (Frischaufov dom na Okrešlju; 1396 m)
- Kranj Lodge at Ledine (Kranjska koča na Ledinah; 1700 m)
- Koroška Rinka (2433 m)
- Valvasor Lodge at Stol (Valvasorjev dom pod Stolom; 1180 m)
- Pristava Lodge in Javorniški Rovt (Dom Pristava v Javorniškem Rovtu; 930 m)
- Golica Lodge (Dom pod Golico; 933 m)
- Rudar Lodge at Vojsko (Planinski dom »Rudar« na Vojskem; 1080 m)
- Predjama (503 m)
- Sveta Trojica (mountain) (1106 m)

== Extended Slovenian Mountain Hiking Trail ==
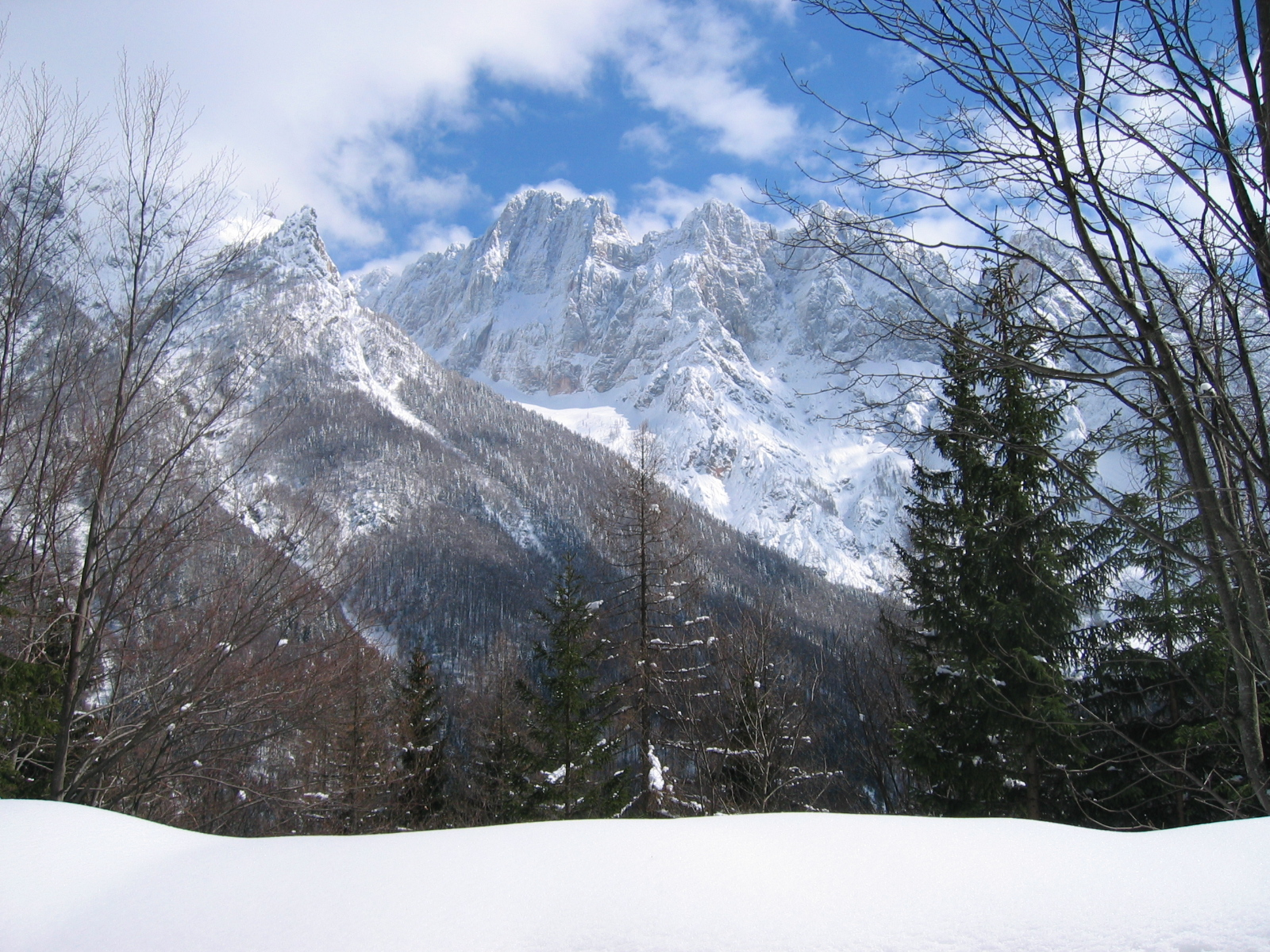
Škrlatica (2740 m), the second highest peak of Slovenia

The Extended Slovenian Mountain Hiking Trail was created in 1966 to include mountains that are dispersed all over the country and are not connected. Until 1993 it had 18 mandatory and 20 non-mandatory control points. (10 of them are over 1000 m high). Then it was enhanced to 35 obligatory control points and one hill.

Julian Alps

- Stol (Julian Alps) (Stol; 1673 m)
- High Kanin (Visoki Kanin; 2587 m) or Rombon (2208 m)
- Mangart (2678 m)
- Bavšica Mount Grintavec (Bavški Grintavec; 2347 m)
- Škrlatica (2740 m) or Špik (2472 m)
- Debela Peč (2014 m)
- Ratitovec — Krek Lodge at Ratitovec (Krekova koča na Ratitovcu; 1642 m)

Karawanks

- Big Peak (Košuta) (Veliki vrh; 2088 m)
- Olševa (1929 m)
- Peca — Kordež Head (Kordeževa glava; 2125 m)

Kamnik–Savinja Alps

- Cold Mountain (Mrzla gora; 2203 m), non-mandatory
- Menina Pasture — Menina Pasture Lodge (Dom na Menini planini; 1453 m)

Northeastern Slovenia

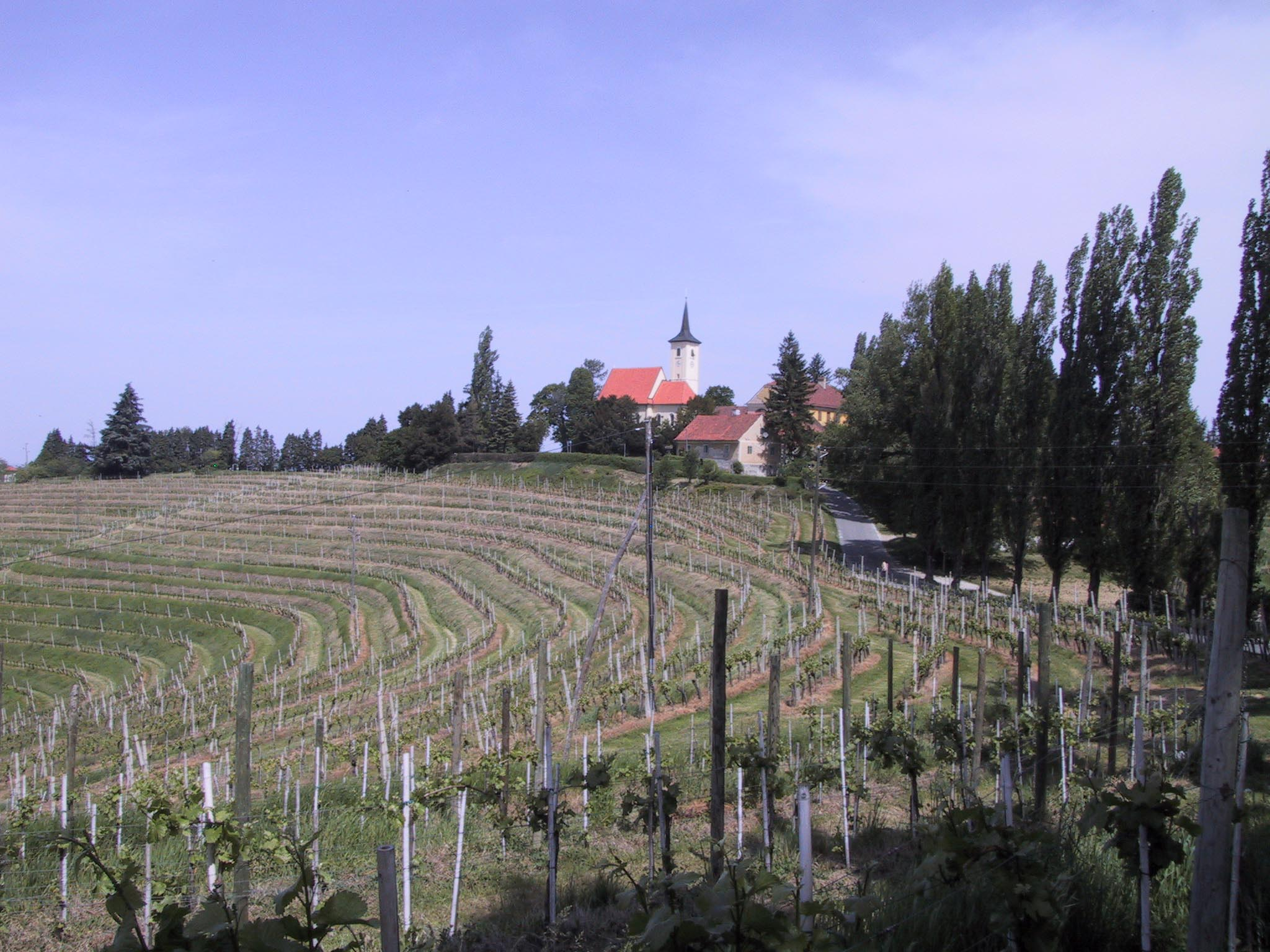
Jeruzalem Hills

- Paka Mount Kozjak (Paški Kozjak) — Paka Kozjak Lodge (Dom na Paškem Kozjaku; 960 m)
- Košenjak (1522 m)
- Žavcar Peak (Žavcarjev vrh) — Žavcar Peak Lodge (Koča na Žavcarjevem vrhu; 863 m)
- Zavrh in the Slovene Hills (Zavrh v Slovenskih goricah; 370 m)
- Jeruzalem, Ljutomer (338 m)
- Selo, Moravske Toplice (295 m)
- Mount Saint Donatus (Donačka gora; 882 m)
- Boč (979 m)

Sava Hills

- Bohor — Bohor Lodge (Koča na Bohorju; 898 m) or Lisca — Tonček Lodge (Tončkov dom; 927 m)
- Resevna — Resevna Lodge (Planinski dom na Resevni; 645 m)
- Mrzlica — Mrzlica Lodge (Planinski dom na Mrzlici; 1093 m) or Kum — Kum Lodge (Planinski dom na Kumu; 1211 m)
- Geometric Centre of the Republic of Slovenia – GEOSS (645 m)

Lower Carniola and White Carniola

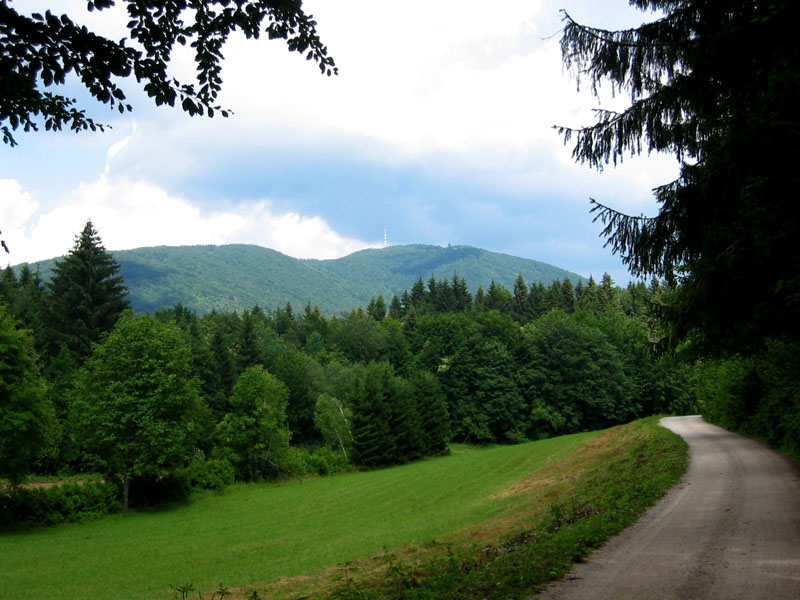
Trdina Peak in the background

- Gradišče — Lavrič Lodge at Gradišče (Lavričeva koča na Gradišču; 510 m)
- Little Mountain (Mala gora) — St. Anne Lodge (Planinska koča pri Sv. Ani na Mali gori; 910 m)
- Gorjanci — Trdina Peak (Trdinov vrh; 1178 m)
- Mount Mirna (Mirna gora) — Mount Mirna Lodge (Planinski dom na Mirni gori; 1000 m)

Inner Carniola

- Big Snežnik (Veliki Snežnik) — Drago Karolin Lodge at Big Snežnik (Koča Draga Karolina na Velikem Snežniku; 1796 m)
- Slivnica — Slivnica Lodge (Dom na Slivnici; 1075 m)
- Krim — Krim Lodge (Planinska koča na Krimu; 1107 m)

Polhov Gradec Hills

- Grmada (898 m)

Škofja Loka Hills

- Lubnik — Lubnik Lodge (Dom na Lubniku; 1025 m)

Littoral

- Matajur (1642 m)
- Korada — Korada Shelter (Planinsko zavetišče na Koradi; 803 m)
- Trstelj — Stjenko Lodge at Trstelj (Stjenkova koča na Trstelju; 610 m)

== See also ==
- List of mountains in Slovenia
