= Loka Lodge at Raduha =

- (Koča na Loki pod Raduho)
- Location within Slovenia

Highest point
- Elevation: 1,534 m (5,033 ft)
- Coordinates: 46°24′33.48″N 14°45′32.9″E

Geography
- Location: Slovenia
- Parent range: Kamnik-Savinja Alps

The Loka Lodge at Raduha (Slovene: Koča na Loki pod Raduho; 1,534 meters or 5,033 feet) is a mountain hostel that stands on the Loka Plateau in northern Slovenia. It is open from the start of June to the end of August.

== Starting points ==
- 1h: from the Vodol Pasture
- 3h: from the village of Luče
- 1¼h: from the Radušnik Farm
- 3¼h: from the village of Bistra

== Neighbouring hills ==
- 1¾h : Big Mount Raduha

== See also ==
- Slovenian Mountain Hiking Trail
