= Prešeren Lodge at Stol =

Mountain hut in Slovenia

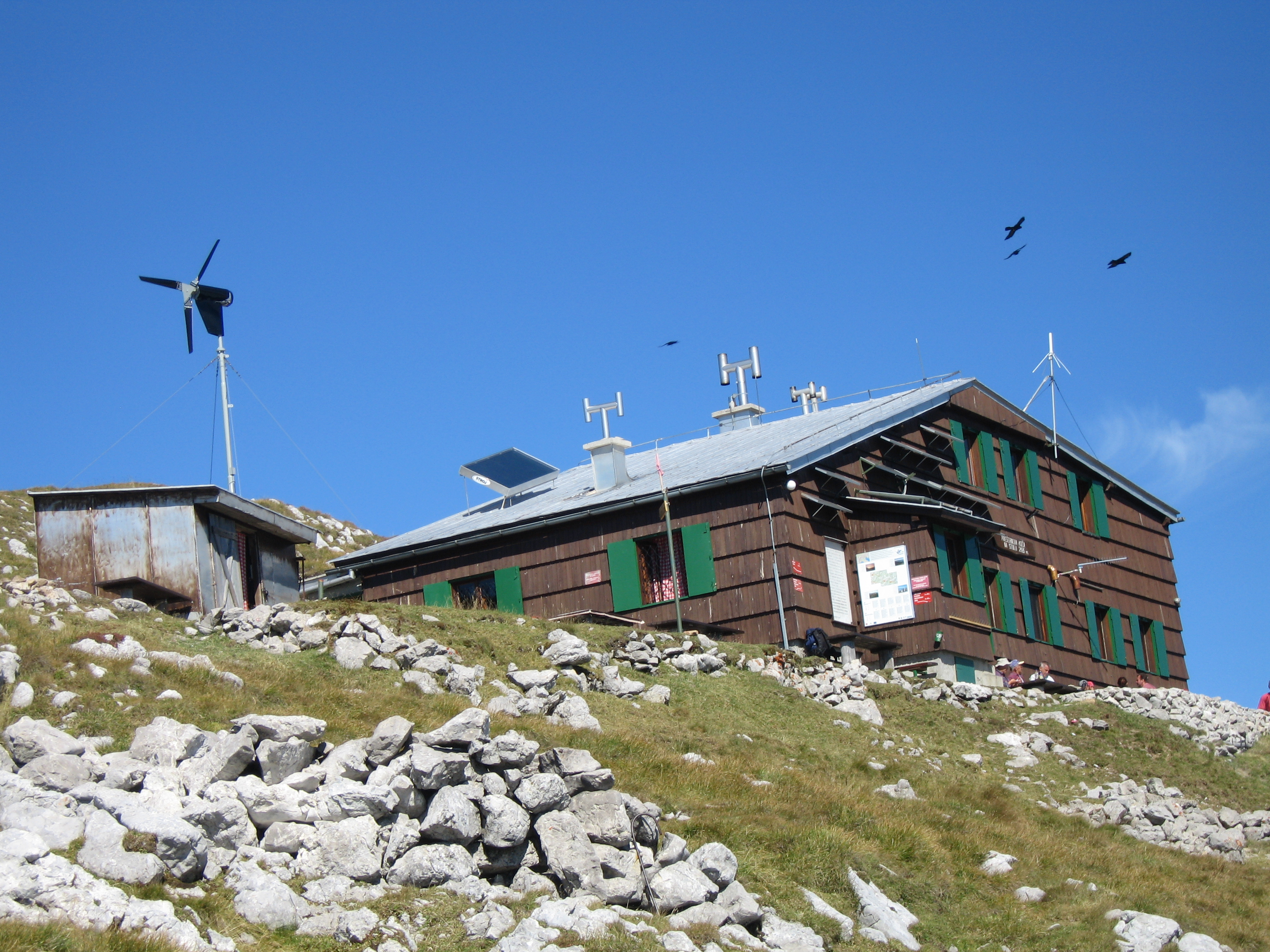
- Prešeren Lodge

Highest point
- Elevation: 2,174 m (7,133 ft)
- Coordinates: 46°25′52.8″N 14°10′29.4″E

Naming
- Native name: Prešernova koča na Stolu (Slovene)

Geography
- Location within Slovenia
- Location: Slovenia
- Parent range: Karawanks

The Prešeren Lodge at Stol (Slovene: Prešernova koča na Stolu; 2,174 m or 7,133 ft) is a mountain hut on the southern side of Mt. Stol in the Karawanks (northwestern Slovenia), just below the peak of Little Stol (Mali Stol; 2,198 m or 7,211 ft). It is named after the Slovenian poet France Prešeren. The first hut was built in 1909. During World War II, it was burnt down; it was rebuilt in 1966.

== Starting points ==
- 4 h: from the Pristava Lodge in Javorniški Rovt (Dom Pristava v Javorniškem Rovtu; 975 m or 3,199 ft), over the Seča Pass
- 2.5 h: from the Valvasor Lodge below Stol (Valvasorjeva koča pod Stolom; 1,181 m (3,875 ft)), via the Slovenian Mountain Hiking Trail
- 3 h: from the Valvasor Lodge below Stol (1,181 m (3,875 ft)), passing the Zabrezje Pasture (Zabreška planina

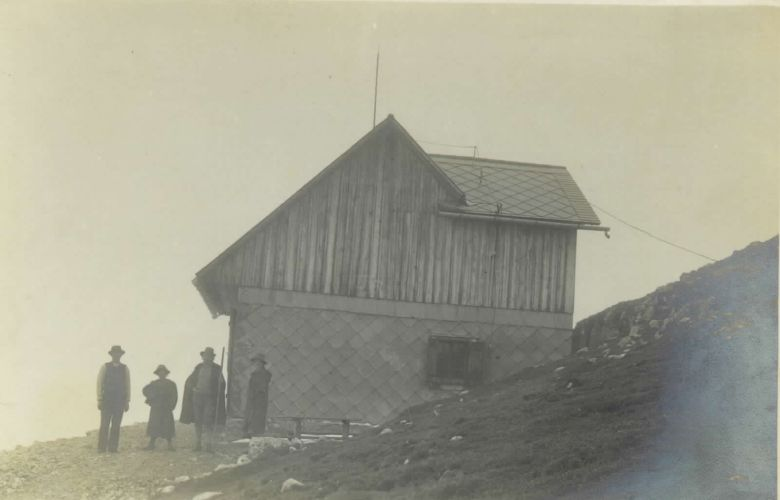
The Prešeren Lodge in 1913

== Nearby lodges ==
- 2 h: Klagenfurt Lodge (Klagenfurter Hütte, 1,663 m or 5,456 ft), across the Belščica Pass (1,840 m or 6,040 ft)
- 3.5 h: Zelenica Lodge (Dom na Zelenici; 1,536 m or 5,039 ft)

== Mountains ==
- 0.25 h: Stol (2,236 m or 7,336 ft)

== See also ==
- Slovenian Mountain Hiking Trail
