= Raduha (mountain) =

Mountain in Slovenia

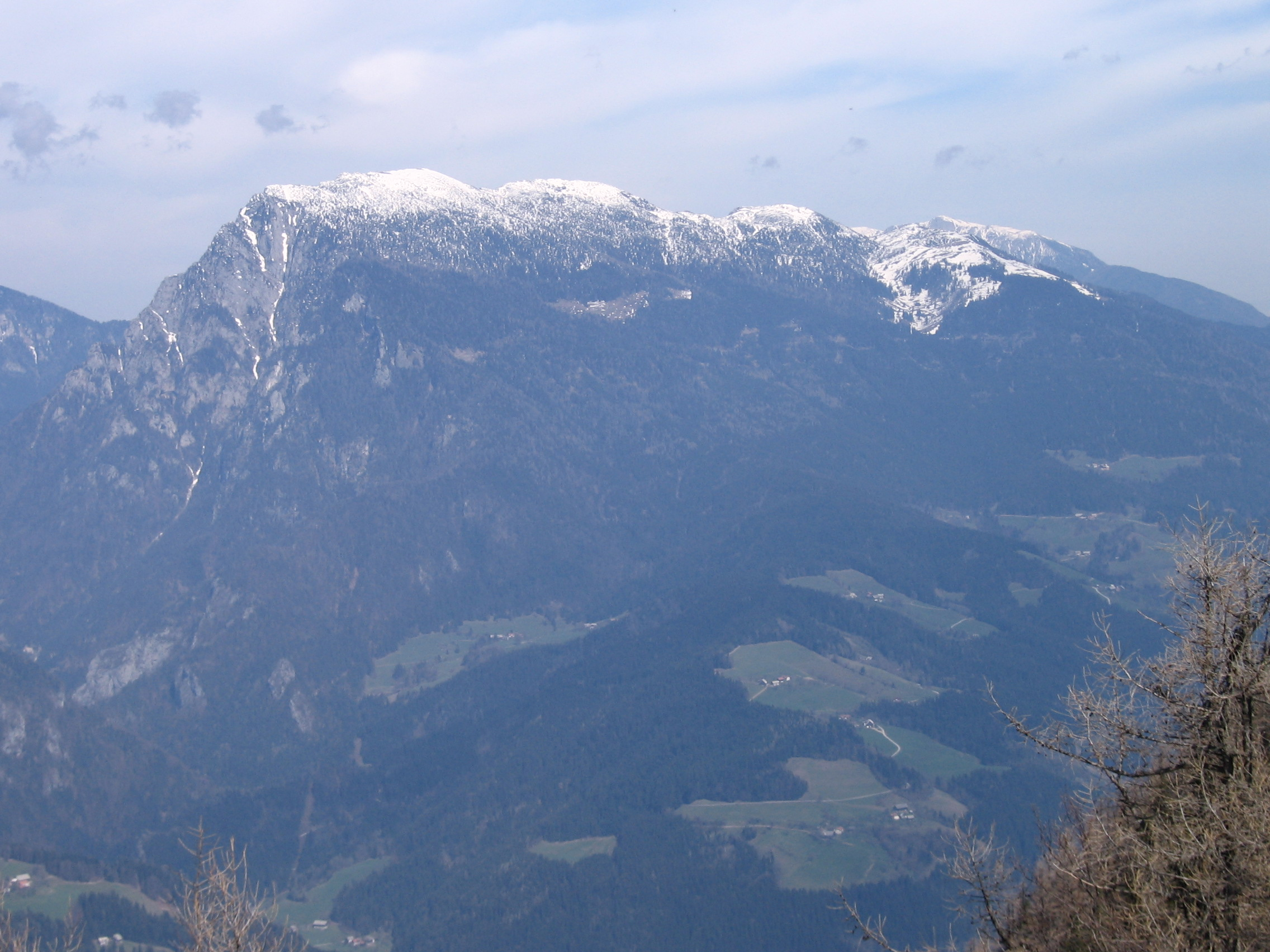

Highest point
- Elevation: 2,062 m (6,765 ft)
- Coordinates: 46°24′34″N 14°44′14″E

Geography
- Location within Slovenia
- Location: Slovenia

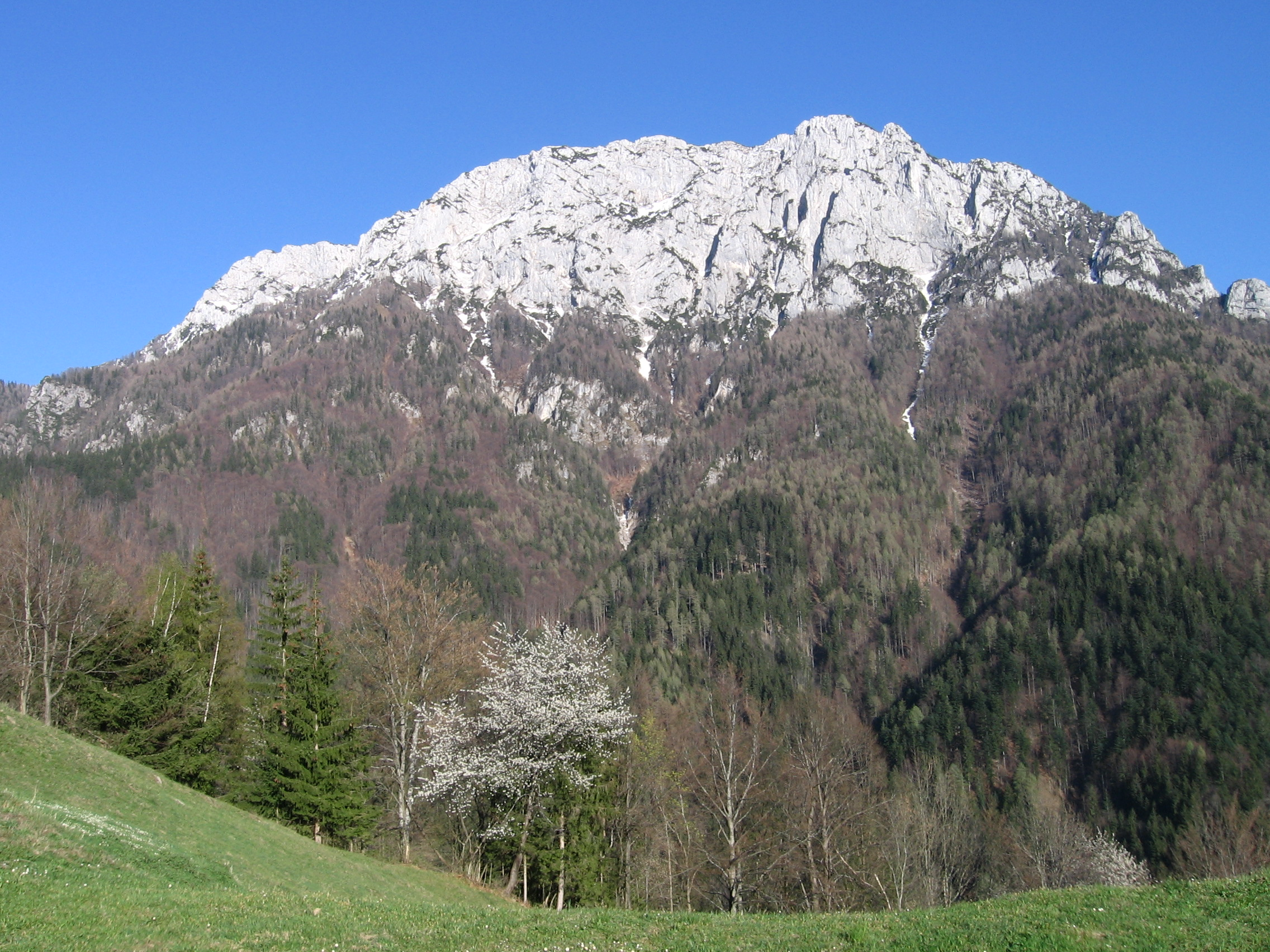
The western side of Raduha

Raduha (pronounced [ˈɾaːduxa]) is a mountain in the eastern part of Kamnik–Savinja Alps in northern Slovenia.

== Geography ==
It is separated from its main group by the Savinja Gorge. It has relatively flat top in the northeast–southwest direction. Its lower peaks are Jelovec (1,845 metres or 6,053 feet), Lanež (1,925 m or 6,316 ft), and Little Raduha (Mala Raduha, 2,029 m or 6,657 ft), and the highest peak is Big Raduha (Velika Raduha, 2,062 m or 6,765 ft). The Loka Lodge (Slovene: Koča na Loki; 1,534 m or 5,033 ft) stands east of the summit. The highest-elevation show cave in Slovenia, Snow Cave (Slovene: Snežna jama), lies on the western side. The western and northern parts are rocky. It is the site of the Grohat mountain pasture with the Grohat Lodge (Slovene: Koča na Grohatu pod Raduho, 1,460 m or 4,790 ft).

== Name ==
Raduha was attested in written sources in 1426 as Radoch. It is based on the hypocorism Radoh, derived from a Slavic personal name such as *Radoslavъ.

== Starting points ==
- Solčava (660 m or 2,170 ft)
- Luče (520 m or 1,710 ft)

== Routes ==
- 3h: from Rogovilc, over the southeastern ridge
- 1½h: from the Loka Pasture, the southern course
- 1½h: from the Loka Pasture, via the Durce Notch
- 1½h: from the Grohat Pasture, via the Durce Notch
- 1h: from the Grohat Pasture, via the northern plains

== See also ==
- Slovene Mountain Hiking Trail
