= Šmartno na Pohorju =

Šmartno na Pohorju Sveti Martin na Pohorju (until 1952)
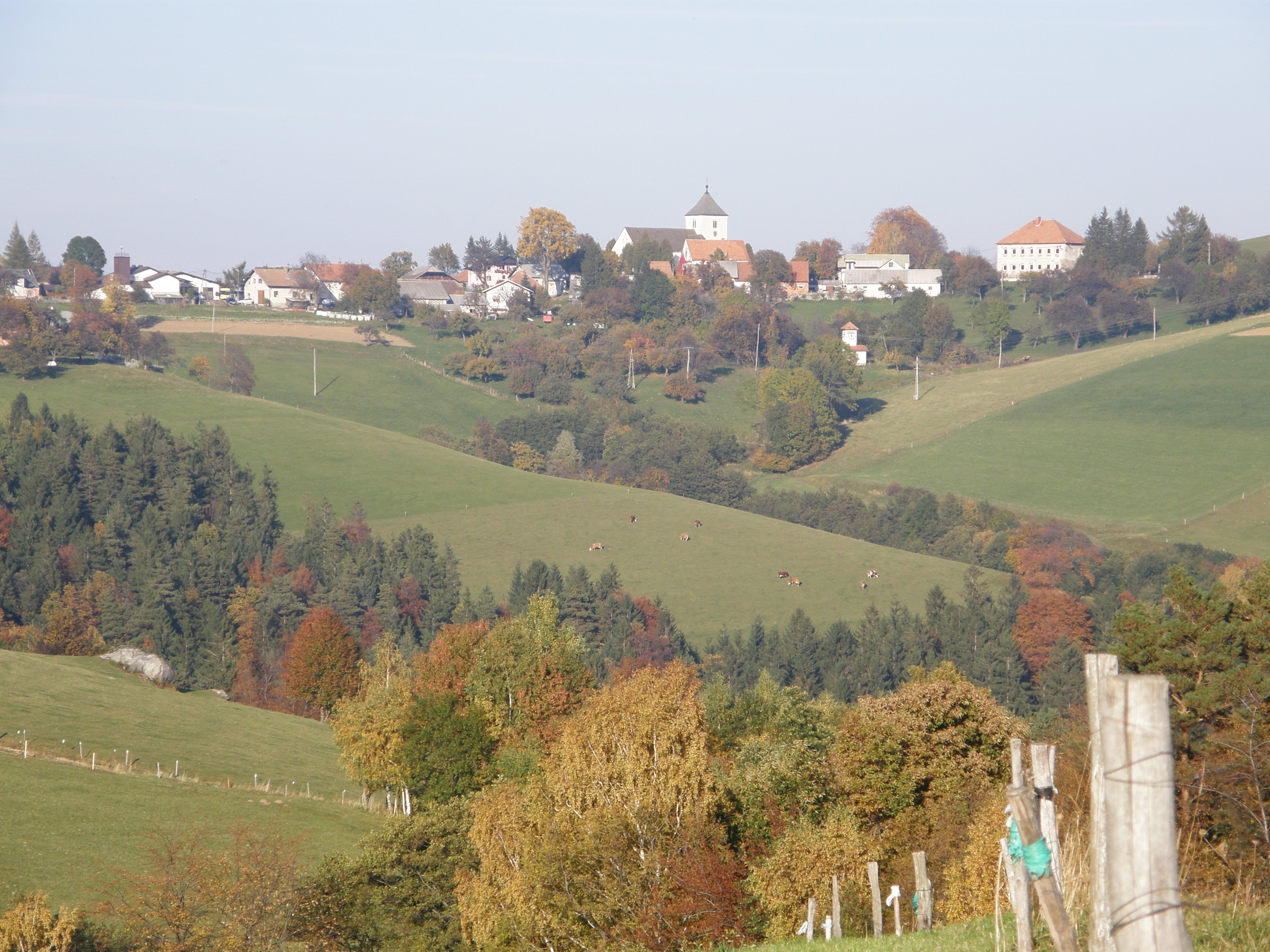

- Location in Slovenia
- Coordinates: 46°26′40.65″N 15°32′23.13″E
- Country: Slovenia
- Traditional region: Styria
- Statistical region: Drava
- Municipality: Slovenska Bistrica

Area
  - Total: 3.14 km^{2} (1.21 sq mi)
- Elevation: 774.5 m (2,541 ft)

Population (2002)
  - Total: 183

Šmartno na Pohorju (pronounced [ˈʃmáːɾtnɔ na ˈpóːxɔɾju]) is a village in the Pohorje Hills in the Municipality of Slovenska Bistrica in northeastern Slovenia. The area is part of the traditional region of Styria. It is now included with the rest of the municipality in the Drava Statistical Region.

== Name ==
The name of the settlement was changed from Sveti Martin na Pohorju (literally, 'Saint Martin on Pohorje') to Šmartno na Pohorju in 1952. The name was changed on the basis of the 1948 Law on Names of Settlements and Designations of Squares, Streets, and Buildings as part of efforts by Slovenia's postwar communist government to remove religious elements from toponyms.

== Church ==
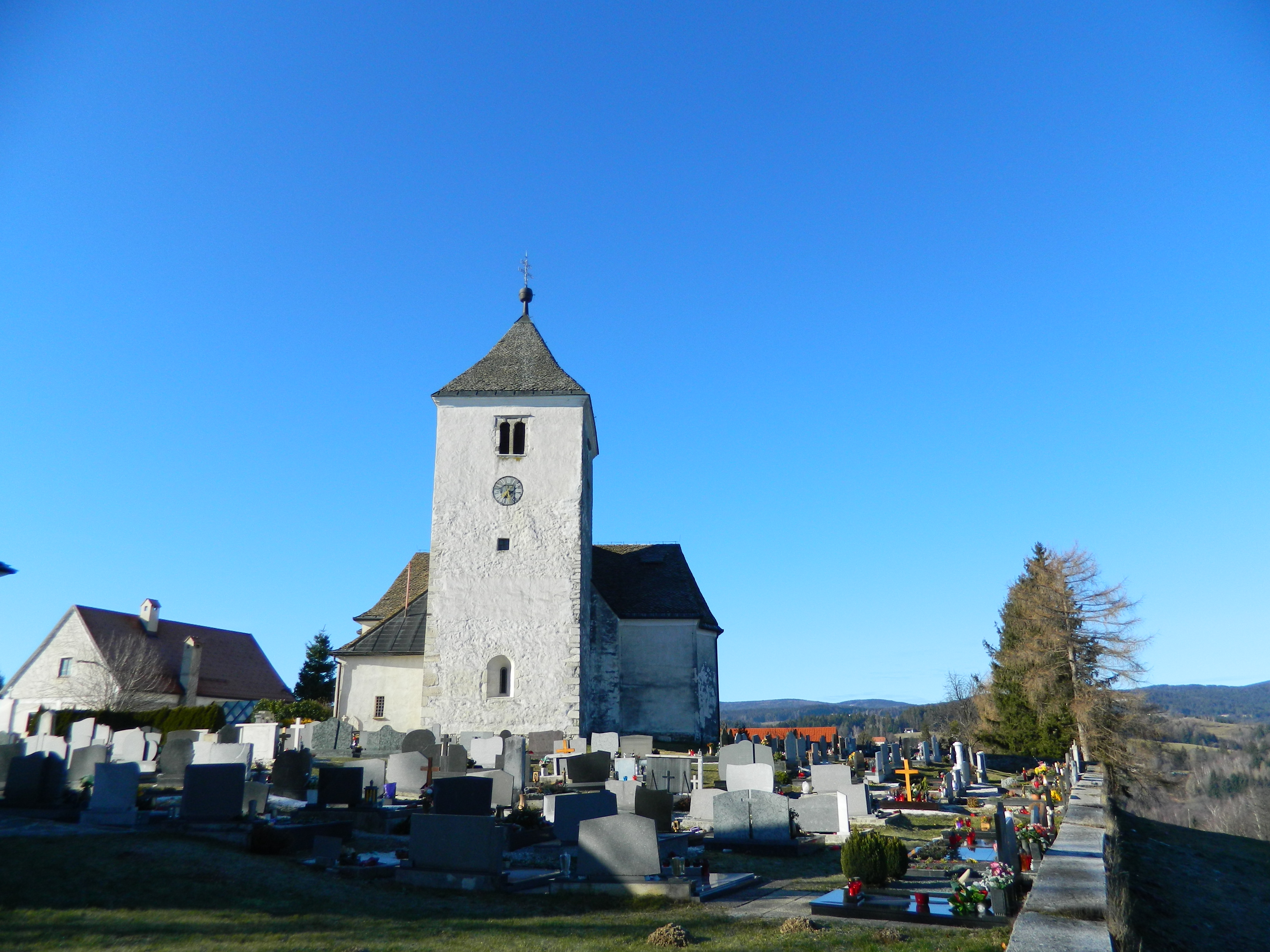
Saint Martin's Church

The local parish church, from which the settlement gets its name, is dedicated to Saint Martin and belongs to the Roman Catholic Archdiocese of Maribor. It dates to the early 13th century.
