= Škrlatica =

Mountain in Slovenia

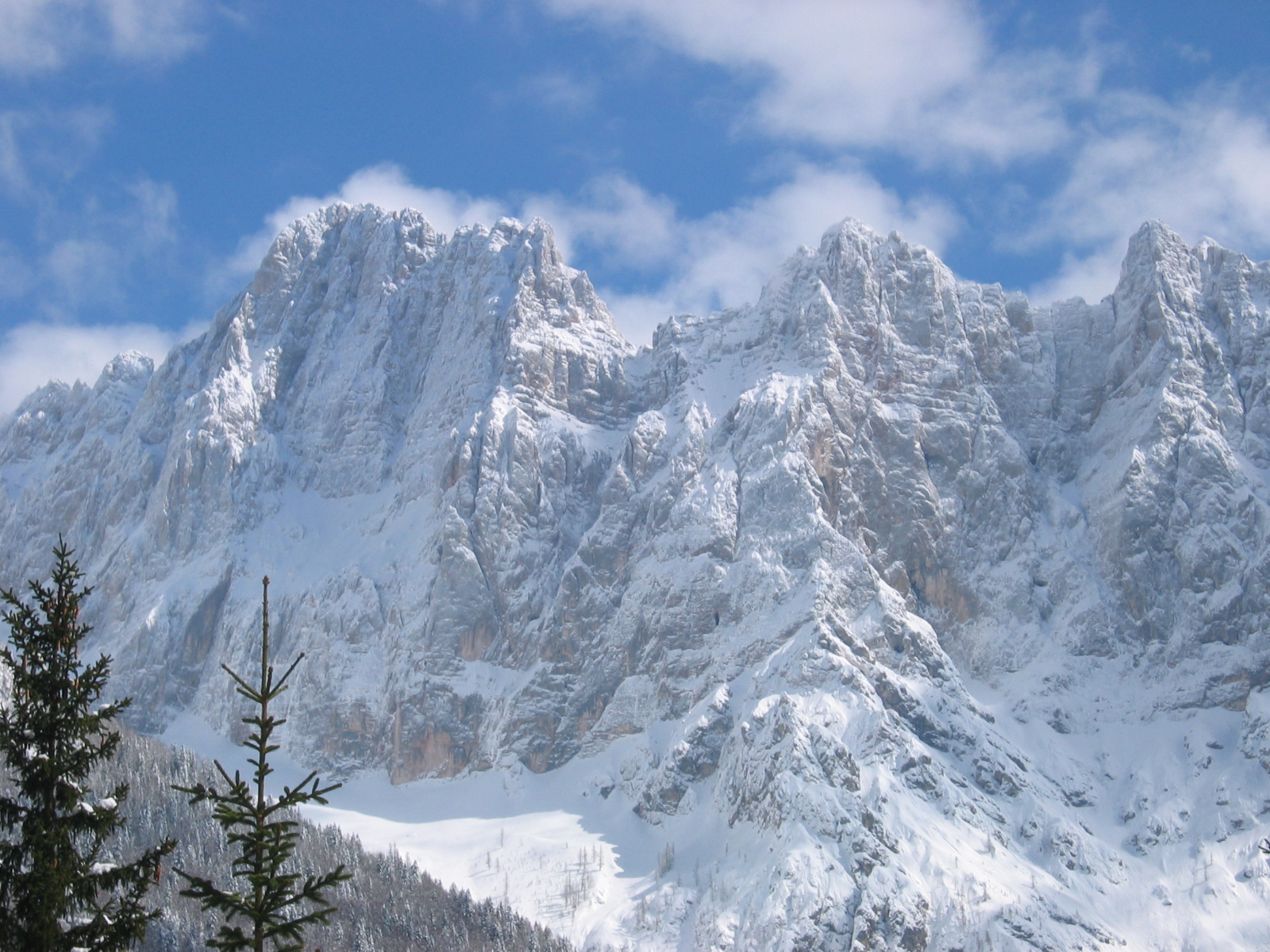
- Škrlatica

Highest point
- Elevation: 2,740 m (8,990 ft)
- Prominence: 982 m (3,222 ft)
- Listing: Alpine mountains 2500-2999 m
- Coordinates: 46°26′N 13°49′E

Geography
- Location: Slovenia
- Parent range: Julian Alps

Škrlatica, historically also known as Suhi plaz, is a mountain in the Slovenian Julian Alps. With its summit at 2,740m above sea level, it is the second-highest peak in Slovenia (after Triglav at 2,864m) and the third highest in the Julian Alps as a whole (after Triglav and Jôf di Montasio / Montaž at 2,754m).

Despite its height, the mountain has a low prominence, as its peak is part of a long, curtain-like ridge.

== Name ==
The name Škrlatica is a dialect development from *Škriljatica, derived from škril 'stone slab', referring to a mountain with many stone slabs. The name is unrelated to the Slovene color word škrlat 'scarlet'. The mountain's archaic name, Suhi plaz, pertains to an avalanche-prone scree below the Spodnji Rokav ridge.

== History ==
The first recorded ascent of Škrlatica was from the southern side on 24 August 1880 by Julius Kugy, accompanied by the mountain guide Andrej Komac and the hunter Matija Kravanja.

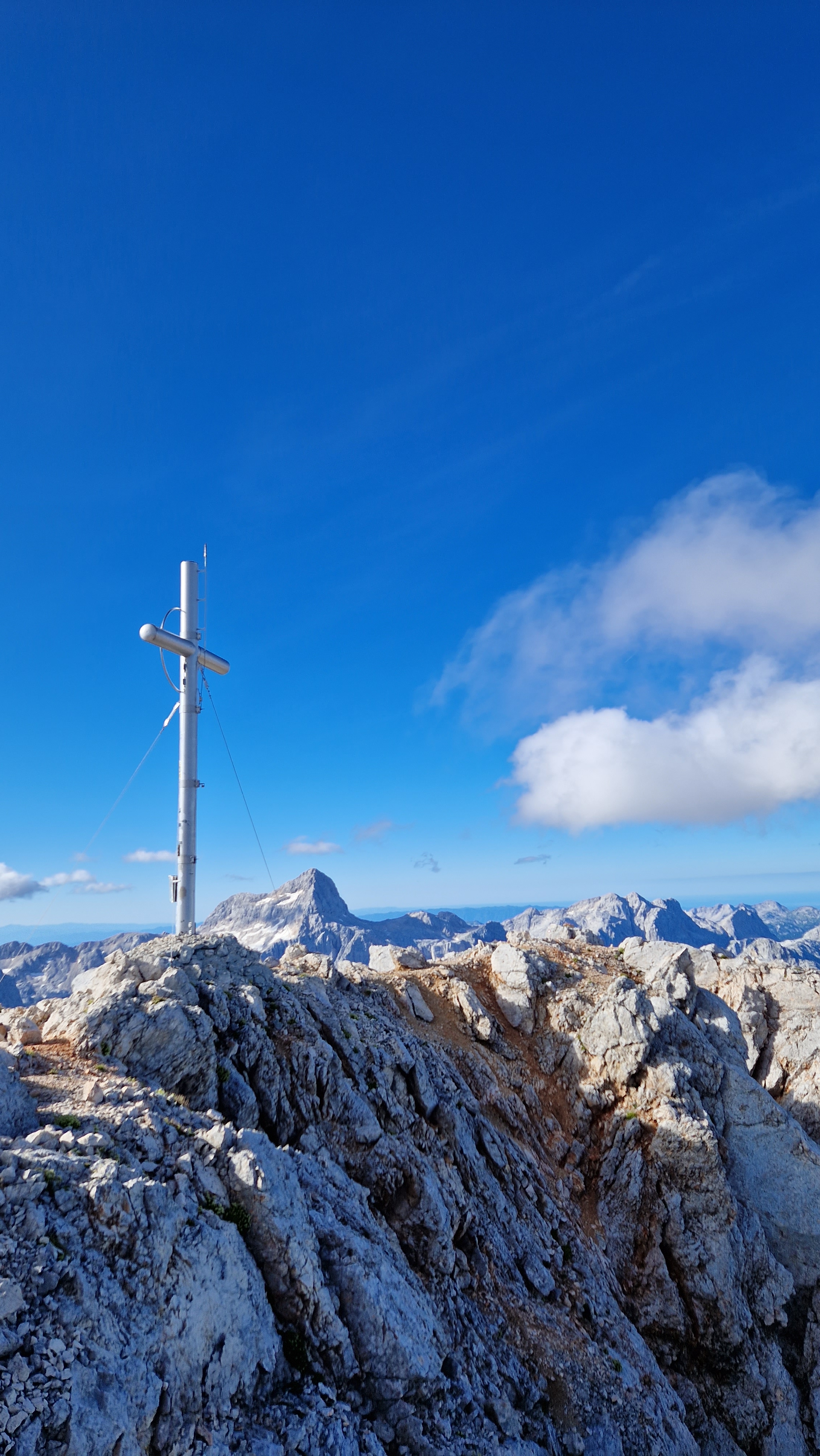
Škrlatica summit cross with Triglav in background
