= Geography of Slovenia =

- Continent: Europe
- Region: Central Europe
- Coordinates: 46°00′N 15°00′E
- Area
  - Total: 20,271 km^{2} (7,827 sq mi)
- Coastline: 47 km (29 mi)
- Highest point: Triglav, 2,864 m
- Lowest point: Adriatic Sea, 0 m
- Longest river: Sava
- Largest lake: Lake Bohinj
- Climate: continental climate Mediterranean climate

Slovenia is situated in Central Europe, touching the Alps and bordering the Adriatic Sea. The Alps—including the Julian Alps, the Kamnik–Savinja Alps and the Karawank chain, as well as the Pohorje massif—dominate northern Slovenia along its long border with Austria. Slovenia's coastline stretches approximately 47 km (29 mi) between Italy and Croatia.

Four major geographic regions meet in Slovenia: the Alps, the Dinarides, the Pannonian Plain, and the Adriatic Sea. Most of Slovenia is in the Black Sea drainage basin. The Alps—including the Julian Alps, the Kamnik-Savinja Alps and the Karawank chain, as well as the Pohorje massif—dominate Northern Slovenia along its border with Austria.

On the Pannonian plain to the east and northeast, toward the Croatian and Hungarian borders, the landscape is essentially flat. However, the majority of Slovenian terrain is hilly or mountainous, with around 90% of the territory 200 meters or more above sea level.

The geometric centre is located at coordinates 46°07′11.8″N 14°48′55.2″E. It lies in Slivna in the Municipality of Litija. Slovenia's highest peak, Triglav (2,864 m or 9,396 ft), is a national symbol, featured on the national coat of arms and flag. The country's average altitude above sea level is 557 m (1,827 ft).

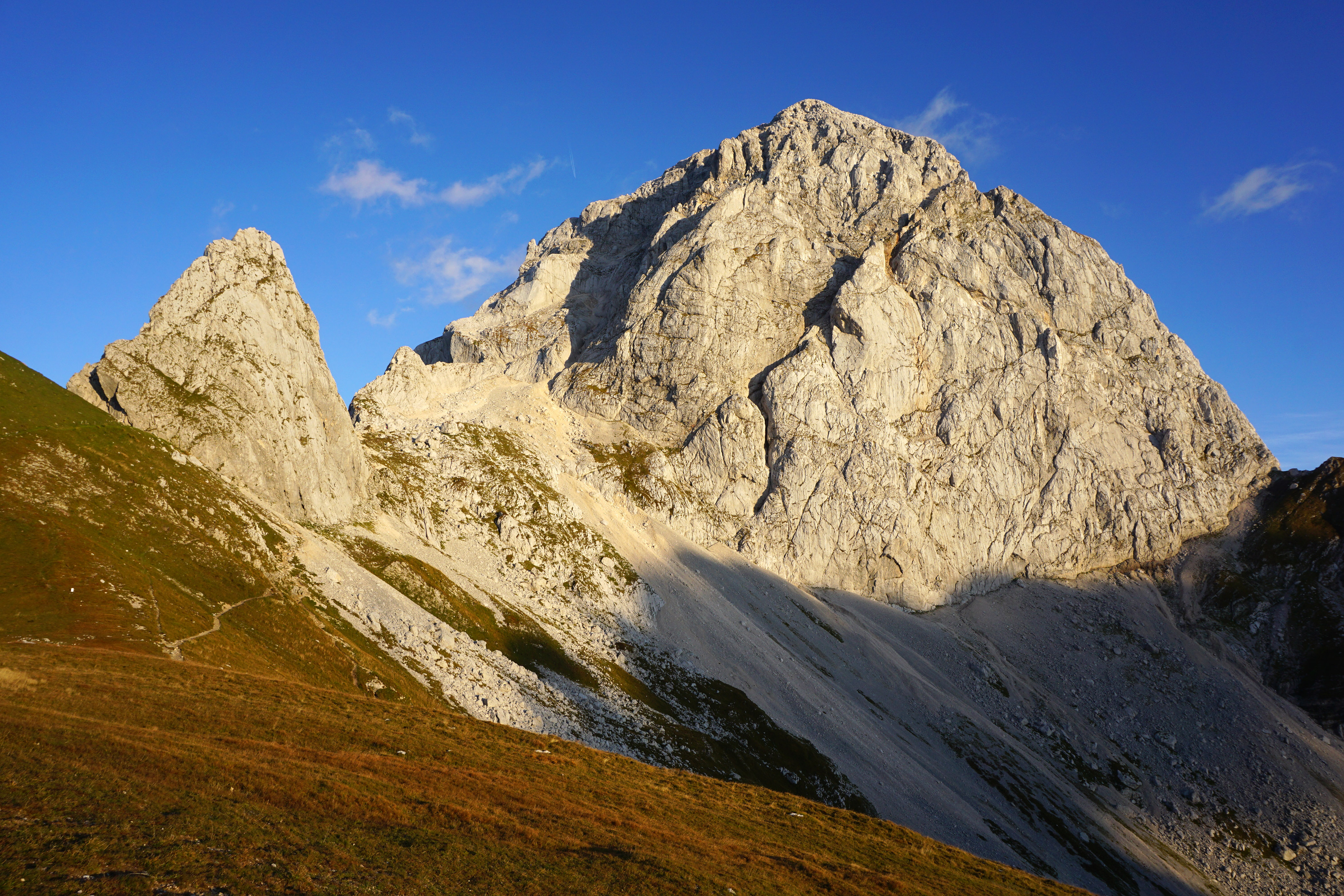
Mount Mangart, in the Julian Alps, is the third-highest peak in Slovenia, after Triglav and Škrlatica.

The term Karst topography refers to southwestern Slovenia's Karst Plateau, a limestone region of underground rivers, gorges, and caves, between Ljubljana and the ocean. On the Pannonian plain to the East and Northeast, toward the Croatian and Hungarian borders, the landscape is essentially flat. However, most of Slovenia is hilly or mountainous, with around 90% of its land surface 200 m (656 ft) or more above sea level.

As of 2020, 60.4% of Slovenia (12,380 km^{2} or 4,780 sq mi) was forested, ranking it second in Europe by percentage of area forested, after Finland. The areas are covered mostly by beech, fir-beech and beech-oak forests and have a relatively high production capacity. Remnants of primeval forests are still to be found, the largest in the Kočevje area. Grassland covers 5,593 km^{2} (2,159 sq mi) and fields and gardens (954 km^{2} or 368 sq mi). Slovenia has 363 km^{2} (140 sq mi) of orchards and 216 km^{2} (83 sq mi) of vineyards.

== Location ==
Slovenia's location is where southeastern and Central Europe meet, where the Eastern Alps border the Adriatic Sea between Austria and Croatia. The 15th meridian east almost corresponds to the middle line of the country in the direction west–east.

== Geographic coordinates ==
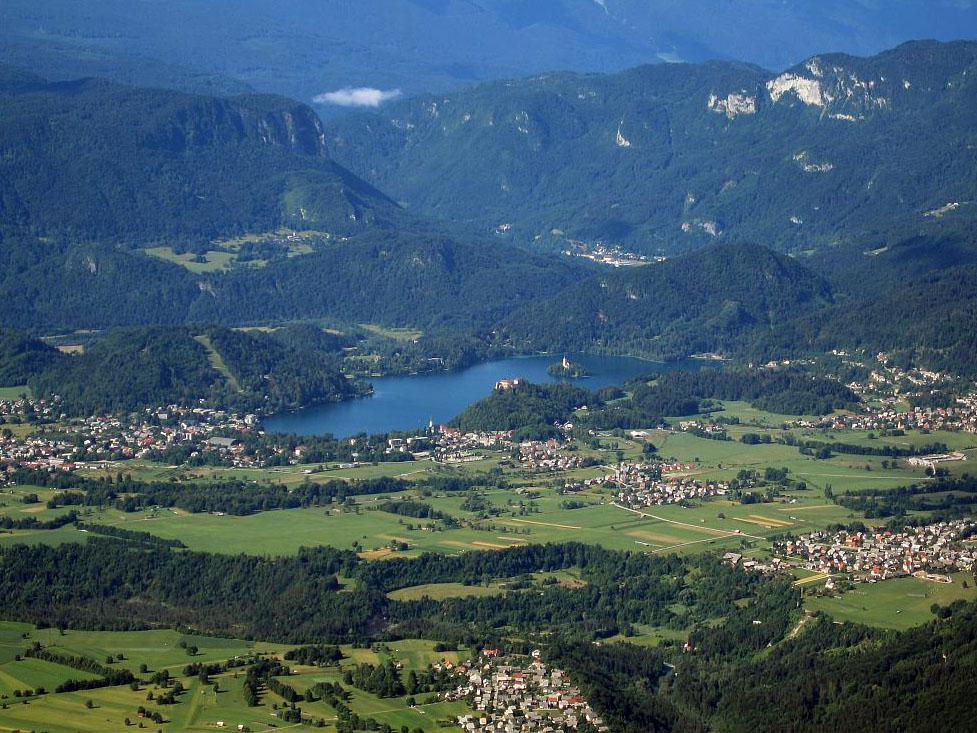
Aerial view of Lake Bled

Extreme geographical points of Slovenia:

- North: 46°52′36″N 16°13′59″E, Budinci, Šalovci,
- South: 45°25′19″N 15°10′0″E, Kot pri Damlju, Municipality of Črnomelj,
- East: 46°28′11″N 16°36′38″E, Pince–Marof, Municipality of Lendava,
- West: 46°17′53″N 13°22′32″E, Robidišče, Municipality of Kobarid.

The maximum north–south distance is 1°28' or 163 km (101 mi).
The maximum east–west distance is 3°13' or 248 km (154 mi).

The geometric centre of Slovenia (GEOSS) is located at 46°07′11.8″N 14°48′55.2″E.

Since 2016, the geodetic system of Slovenia with the elevation benchmark of 0 m has its origin at the Koper tide gauge station. Until then, it referred to the Sartorio mole in Trieste (see metres above the Adriatic).

== Area ==
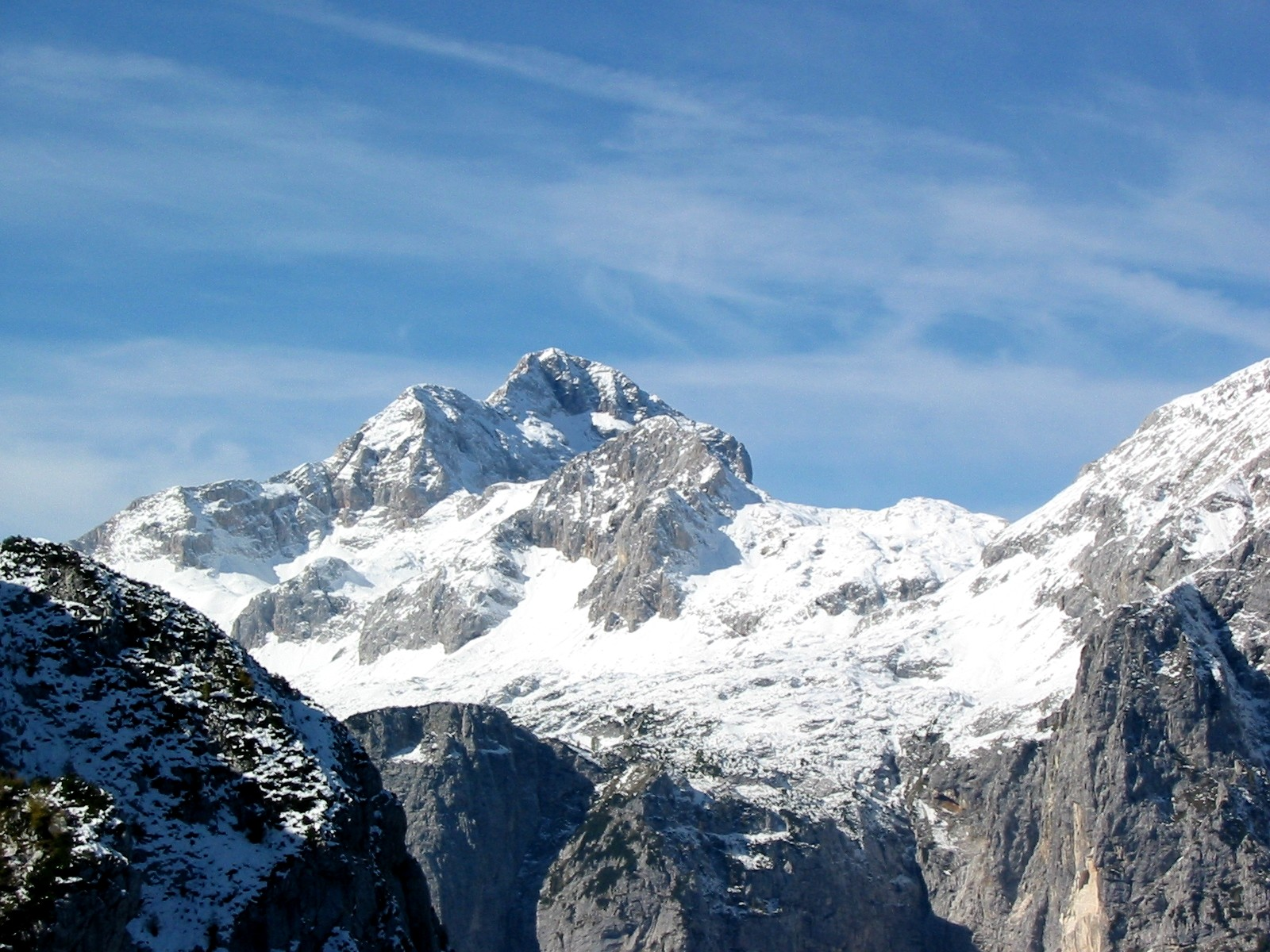
Mount Triglav

- Total: 20,271 km^{2}
- Land: 20,149 km^{2}
- Water: 122 km^{2}
- Comparison: slightly smaller than New Jersey

== Borders ==
- Land boundaries
  - Total: 1,086 km
  - Border countries: Croatia 670 km, Austria 330 km, Italy 280 km, Hungary 102 km
- Coastline: 47 km
- Maritime claims:

The entire Slovenian coastline is located on the Gulf of Trieste. Towns along the coastline include:

- Koper
- Izola
- Portorož
- Piran

== Regions ==
=== Historical regions ===
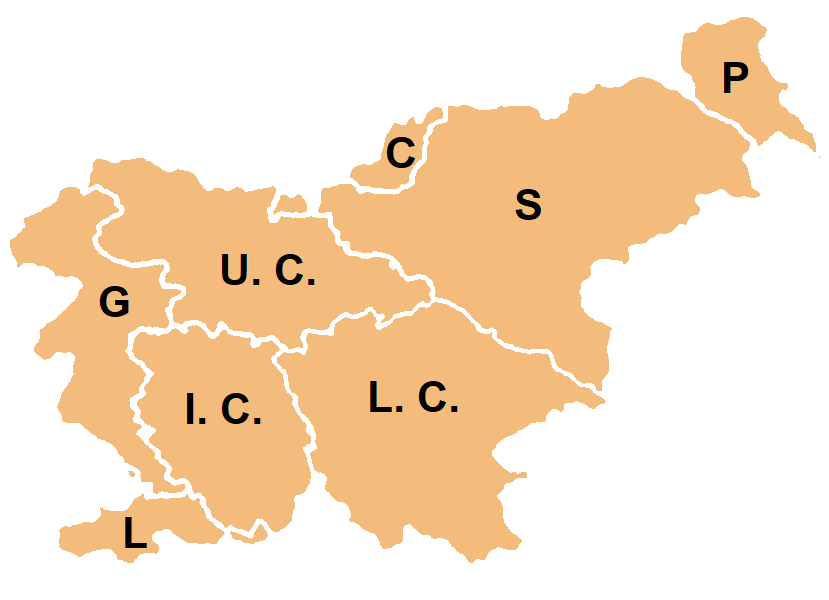
Slovenia is traditionally divided into eight regions.

The traditional Slovenian regions, based on the former division of Slovenia into the four Habsburg crown lands (Carniola, Carinthia, Styria, and the Littoral) and their parts, are:

- Upper Carniola (Gorenjska) (denoted on the map by U.C.)
- Styria (Štajerska) (S)
- Prekmurje (P)
- Carinthia (Koroška) (C)
- Inner Carniola (Notranjska) (I.C.)
- Lower Carniola (Dolenjska) (L.C.)
- Gorizia (Goriška) (G)
- Slovenian Istria (Slovenska Istra) (L)

The last two are usually considered together as the Littoral Region (Primorska). White Carniola (Bela krajina), otherwise part of Lower Carniola, is usually considered a separate region, as is the Central Sava Valley (Zasavje), which is otherwise a part of Upper and Lower Carniola and Styria.

Slovenian Littoral has no natural island, but there is a plan on building an artificial one.

== Climate ==
Köppen climate classification types of Slovenia

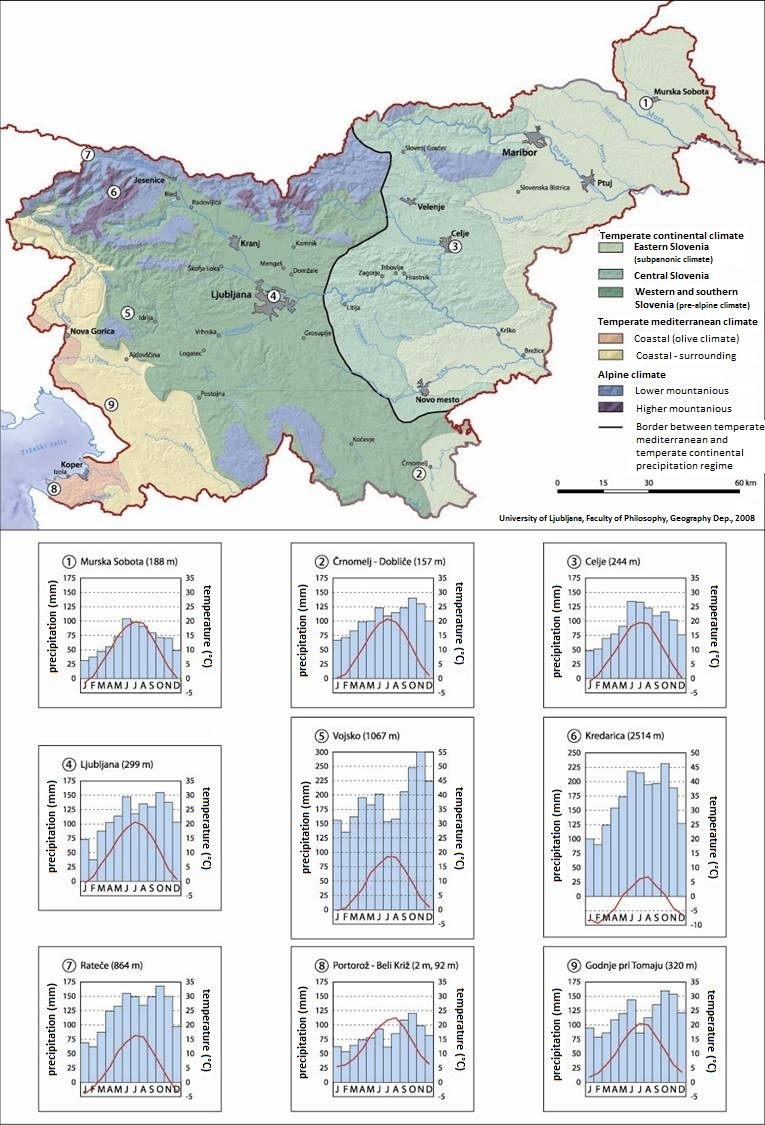
Climate types of Slovenia 1970–2000 and climographs for selected settlements

Slovenia is located in temperate latitudes. The climate is influenced by the relief, and the influence of the Alps and the sea. In the northeast, the continental climate type with the greatest difference between winter and summer temperatures prevails. Humid subtropical climate (Cfa) prevails on the coast, oceanic climate (Cfb) in most of Slovenia, continental climate with mild to hot summers and cold winters (Dfb) in the plateaus and mountains on the north, subpolar (Dfc) and tundra (ET) climate above the treeline on the tallest peaks. Precipitation is high away from the coast, with the spring being particularly prone to rainfall. Slovenia's Alps have frequent snowfalls during the winter.

Precipitation, often coming from the Gulf of Genoa, varies across the country, with over 3,500 mm (138 in) in some western regions and only 800 mm (31 in) in Prekmurje. Snow is frequent in winter; the record snow cover in Ljubljana was recorded in 1952 at 146 cm (57 in).

Compared to Western Europe, Slovenia is not windy, because it lies in the Alps' slipstream. Average wind speeds are lower than in the plains of the nearby countries. Due to the rugged terrain, local vertical winds with daily periods are present. Besides these, three winds are of particular regional importance: the bora, the jugo, and the foehn. The jugo and the bora are characteristic of the Littoral. While the jugo is humid and warm, the bora is usually cold and gusty. The foehn is typical of Alpine regions in northern Slovenia. Generally present in Slovenia are the northeast wind, the southeast wind and the north wind.

Climate data for Ljubljana
Month	Jan	Feb	Mar	Apr	May	Jun	Jul	Aug	Sep	Oct	Nov	Dec	Year
Record high °C (°F)	15.8 (60.4)	22.3 (72.1)	24.3 (75.7)	27.8 (82.0)	32.4 (90.3)	35.6 (96.1)	37.1 (98.8)	40.2 (104.4)	30.3 (86.5)	25.8 (78.4)	20.9 (69.6)	16.7 (62.1)	40.2 (104.4)
Mean daily maximum °C (°F)	3.4 (38.1)	6.4 (43.5)	11.4 (52.5)	16.1 (61.0)	21.4 (70.5)	24.6 (76.3)	27.3 (81.1)	26.7 (80.1)	21.6 (70.9)	15.9 (60.6)	8.8 (47.8)	3.8 (38.8)	15.6 (60.1)
Daily mean °C (°F)	0.3 (32.5)	1.9 (35.4)	6.5 (43.7)	10.8 (51.4)	15.8 (60.4)	19.1 (66.4)	21.3 (70.3)	20.6 (69.1)	16.0 (60.8)	11.2 (52.2)	5.6 (42.1)	1.2 (34.2)	10.9 (51.6)
Mean daily minimum °C (°F)	−2.5 (27.5)	−2.0 (28.4)	1.7 (35.1)	5.8 (42.4)	10.3 (50.5)	13.7 (56.7)	15.5 (59.9)	15.2 (59.4)	11.5 (52.7)	7.7 (45.9)	2.8 (37.0)	−1.1 (30.0)	6.6 (43.9)
Record low °C (°F)	−20.3 (−4.5)	−23.3 (−9.9)	−14.1 (6.6)	−3.2 (26.2)	0.2 (32.4)	3.8 (38.8)	7.4 (45.3)	5.8 (42.4)	3.1 (37.6)	−5.2 (22.6)	−14.5 (5.9)	−14.5 (5.9)	−23.3 (−9.9)
Average precipitation mm (inches)	69 (2.7)	70 (2.8)	88 (3.5)	99 (3.9)	109 (4.3)	144 (5.7)	115 (4.5)	137 (5.4)	147 (5.8)	147 (5.8)	129 (5.1)	107 (4.2)	1,362 (53.6)
Average precipitation days (≥ 0.1 mm)	11	9	11	14	14	15	12	12	12	13	14	14	153
Mean monthly sunshine hours	71	114	149	178	235	246	293	264	183	120	66	56	1,974
Source 1: Slovenian Environment Agency (ARSO) (data for 1981–2010)
Source 2: Slovenian Environment Agency (ARSO) OGIMET (some extreme values for 1948–2013)

Climate data for Maribor
Month	Jan	Feb	Mar	Apr	May	Jun	Jul	Aug	Sep	Oct	Nov	Dec	Year
Record high °C (°F)	17.4 (63.3)	21.5 (70.7)	26.0 (78.8)	28.0 (82.4)	30.9 (87.6)	34.7 (94.5)	35.8 (96.4)	40.6 (105.1)	31.4 (88.5)	27.2 (81.0)	21.5 (70.7)	20.7 (69.3)	40.6 (105.1)
Mean daily maximum °C (°F)	3.9 (39.0)	6.6 (43.9)	11.4 (52.5)	16.2 (61.2)	21.3 (70.3)	24.4 (75.9)	26.6 (79.9)	26.1 (79.0)	21.4 (70.5)	16.0 (60.8)	9.2 (48.6)	4.4 (39.9)	15.6 (60.1)
Daily mean °C (°F)	−0.2 (31.6)	1.7 (35.1)	6.0 (42.8)	10.8 (51.4)	15.8 (60.4)	19.0 (66.2)	21.0 (69.8)	20.3 (68.5)	15.7 (60.3)	10.7 (51.3)	5.1 (41.2)	0.9 (33.6)	10.8 (51.4)
Mean daily minimum °C (°F)	−3.6 (25.5)	−2.3 (27.9)	1.6 (34.9)	5.9 (42.6)	10.5 (50.9)	13.7 (56.7)	15.6 (60.1)	15.4 (59.7)	11.3 (52.3)	6.8 (44.2)	1.8 (35.2)	−2.0 (28.4)	6.2 (43.2)
Record low °C (°F)	−21.0 (−5.8)	−20.2 (−4.4)	−15.2 (4.6)	−5.1 (22.8)	−1.1 (30.0)	3.6 (38.5)	6.3 (43.3)	5.5 (41.9)	−1.0 (30.2)	−5.9 (21.4)	−12.7 (9.1)	−17.6 (0.3)	−21.0 (−5.8)
Average precipitation mm (inches)	35 (1.4)	38 (1.5)	57 (2.2)	60 (2.4)	83 (3.3)	107 (4.2)	94 (3.7)	112 (4.4)	99 (3.9)	78 (3.1)	69 (2.7)	61 (2.4)	893 (35.2)
Average precipitation days (≥ 0.1 mm)	9.0	8.0	10.0	13.0	14.0	15.0	13.0	12.0	11.0	10.0	11.0	11.0	137.0
Mean monthly sunshine hours	86	118	148	185	237	242	277	253	191	143	90	67	2,037
Source: Slovenian Environment Agency (ARSO), sunshine hours are for: Maribor Edvard Rusjan Airport 1981–2010 (data for 1981–2010)

== Terrain ==
The northern part of the country is mountainous and consists of the Julian Alps, Karawanks, Kamnik–Savinja Alps and the Pohorje massif.

Further east lies the Pannonian plain, which dominates the region of Prekmurje.

Central Slovenia is largely hilly and forested, with the exception of the Ljubljana Basin and the encompassed Ljubljana Marsh, a large wetlands region which was largely drained in the time of the Habsburg monarchy, but still remains a flood zone.

To the southeast of the Ljubljana Basin lies the Karst plateau, a hilly region containing various caves, sinkholes, intermittent lakes and other features of Karst topography.

Southern Slovenia is home to the Javornik Hills, the beginning of the Dinaric Alps. In the southeast is a short coastal strip on the Adriatic Sea.

There is only one natural island in Slovenia: Bled Island in Lake Bled in the country's northwest. Lake Bled and Bled Island are Slovenia's most popular tourist destination.

=== Elevation extremes ===
- Lowest point: Adriatic Sea 0 m (tide gauge station in Koper)
- Highest point: Triglav 2,864 m (9,396 ft), located in the Julian Alps

== Natural resources ==
More than half of Slovenia, which is 11,823 km^{2} or 4,565 sq mi, is forested; ranking it third in Europe, by percentage of area forested, after Finland and Sweden. The areas are covered mostly by beech, fir-beech and beech-oak forests and have a high production capacity. Remnants of primeval forests are still to be found, the largest in the Kočevje area. Grassland covers 5,593 km^{2} (2,159 sq mi) and fields and gardens (954 km^{2} or 368 sq mi). There are 363 km^{2} (140 sq mi) of orchards and 216 km^{2} (83 sq mi) of vineyards.

Slovenia's terrain and abundance of rivers makes it ideal for hydropower, which is responsible for around a third of the country's electricity production.

Various building stones, most notably marble and limestone have been quarried in the country for centuries. The Podpeč quarry has been used to extract marble since the Roman times.

=== Mining ===
Slovenia is not known for large mining operations, but still has some notable deposits:

Lignite coal is found primarily in the northeastern part of the country. The country has been extracting this resource for power generation, most notably for use in the Šoštanj Power Plant, however it does not produce enough lignite to be self-sufficient and still largely relies on imports. In 2022, Slovenia produced 2.4 million tonnes of lignite.

The country has deposits of heavy metals, primarily Mercury, Lead and Zinc. Mercury was historically mined in the town of Idrija, which is one of the rare regions in the world where it appears both in its elemental form and as cinnabar ore. Lead and Zinc were mined in the Mežica mine. Both have since closed and have been converted into tourist attractions.

Uranium was also discovered near Žirovski Vrh in the 1960s and a mine operated for a short time, but falling Uranium prices made the mine close in 1990 after only 8 years of operation.

=== Land use ===
- Arable land: 8.53%
- Permanent crops: 1.43%
- Other: 90.04% (2005)
- Irrigated land: 100 km^{2} (2003)
- Natural hazards: minor flooding and earthquakes

== Environment ==
=== Current issues ===
The Sava River polluted with domestic and industrial waste; pollution of coastal waters with heavy metals and toxic chemicals; forest damage near Koper from air pollution (originating at chemical plants) and resulting acid rain.

=== International agreements ===
- Party to: Air Pollution, Air Pollution-Persistent Organic Pollutants, Air Pollution-Sulphur 94, Biodiversity, Climate Change, Climate Change-Kyoto Protocol, Endangered Species, Hazardous Wastes, Law of the Sea, Marine Dumping, Nuclear Test Ban, Ozone Layer Protection, Ship Pollution (MARPOL 73/78), Wetlands, Whaling
- Signed, but not ratified:

== See also ==
- List of mountains in Slovenia
- Online map services of Slovenia
- Protected areas of Slovenia
- Slovene Riviera (Slovenska obala)

== Bibliography ==
- Poljak, Željko (February 1959). "Ostali krajevi Slovenije". Kazalo za "Hrvatski planinar" i "Naše planine" 1898—1958 (PDF). Naše planine (in Croatian). Vol. XI. p. 30. ISSN 0354-0650.
