= Hoče =

Hoče may refer to:

- Hoče, a former village and municipality
- Municipality of Hoče-Slivnica, a municipality in Slovenia
- Spodnje Hoče, a settlement in the Municipality of Hoče–Slivnica
- Zgornje Hoče, a settlement in the Municipality of Hoče–Slivnica
