= Pohorje (disambiguation) =

Pohorje can be:

- Pohorje - mountain range in Slovenia.

== Settlement ==
- Hočko Pohorje, Hoče–Slivnica municipality
- Slivniško Pohorje, Hoče–Slivnica municipality
- Pohorje, Cirkulane, Cirkulane municipality
