= Bohova =

Bohova may refer to:

In Bulgaria:

- Bohova, Pernik Province, a village in Tran Municipality

In Slovenia:

- Bohova, Hoče–Slivnica, a settlement in the Municipality of Hoče–Slivnica
