= Pivola =

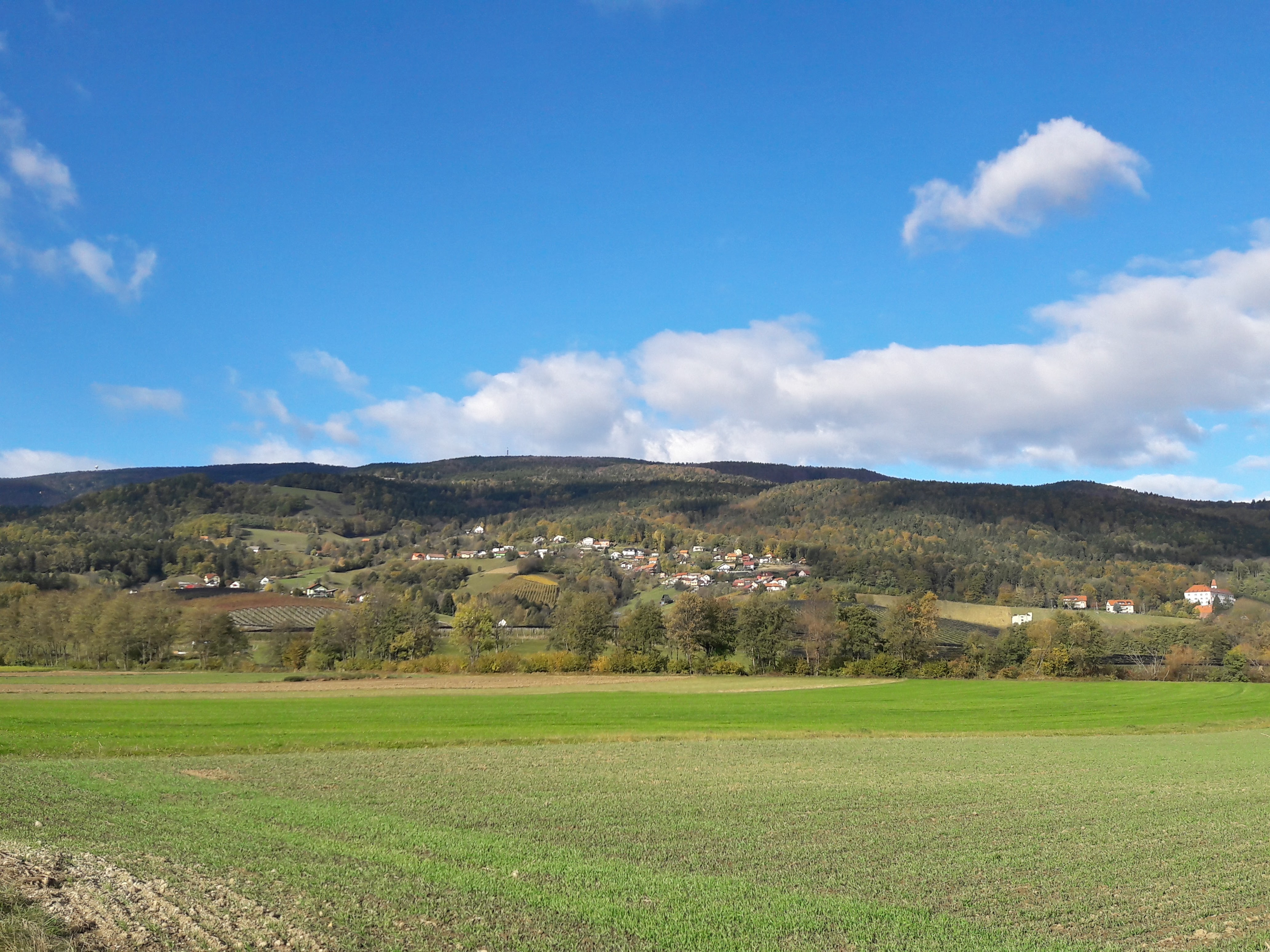
- Pivola

- Location in Slovenia
- Coordinates: 46°30′15.46″N 15°37′25.47″E
- Country: Slovenia
- Traditional region: Styria
- Statistical region: Drava
- Municipality: Hoče–Slivnica

Area
  - Total: 4.25 km^{2} (1.64 sq mi)
- Elevation: 342.2 m (1,123 ft)

Population (2002)
  - Total: 649

Pivola (pronounced [ˈpiːʋɔla]) is a settlement in the Municipality of Hoče–Slivnica in northeastern Slovenia. It lies on the eastern edge of the Pohorje Hills south of Maribor. The municipality is now included in the Drava Statistical Region.

The local church is dedicated to Saint Leonard and belongs to the Parish of Hoče. It was built in 1642.

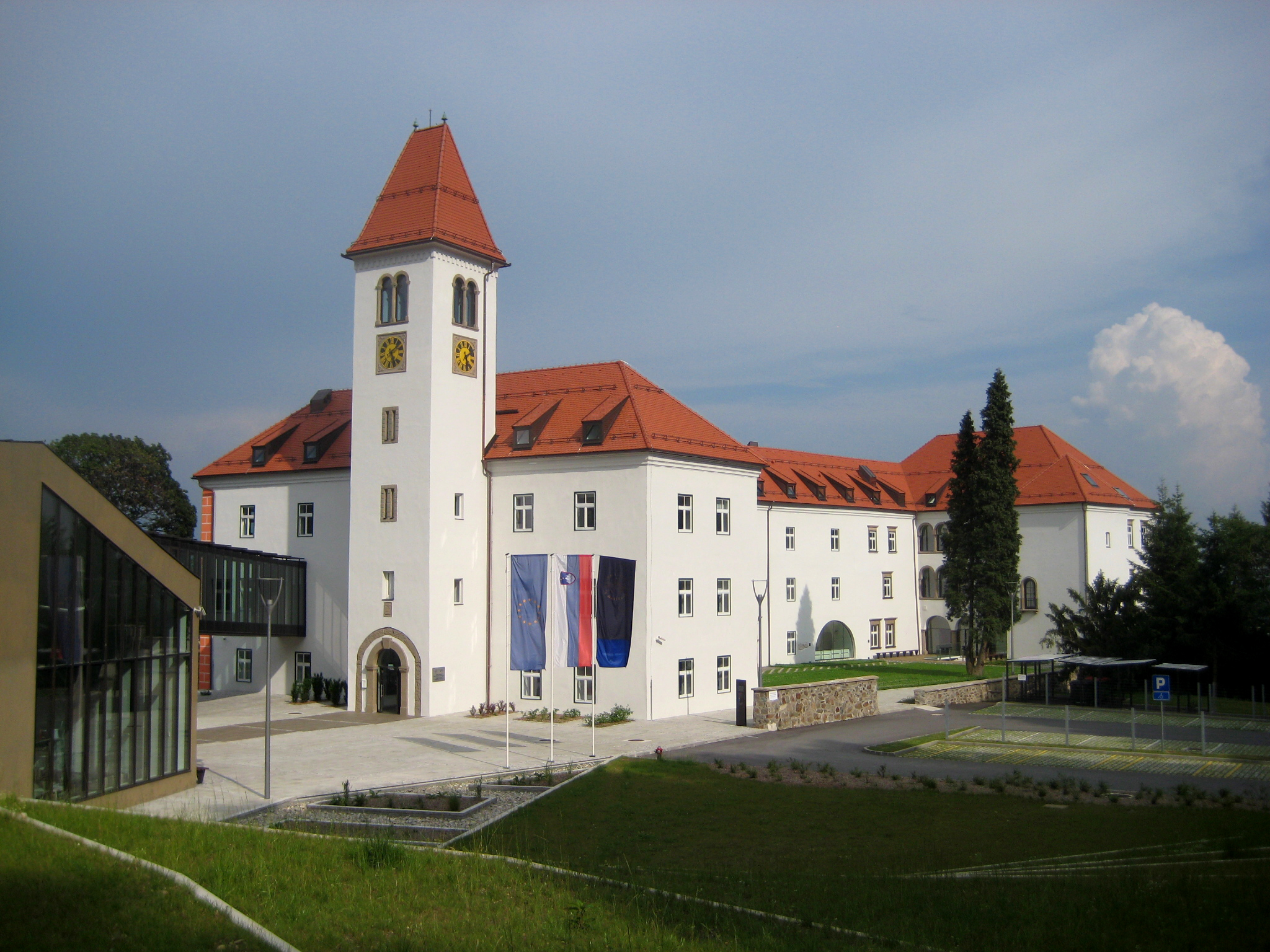
Hompoš Castle, just north of the settlement

Hompoš Castle is a castle just north of the settlement. It was first mentioned in written documents dating to the 12th century and has had numerous rebuildings and adaptations over the centuries.
