= Radizel =

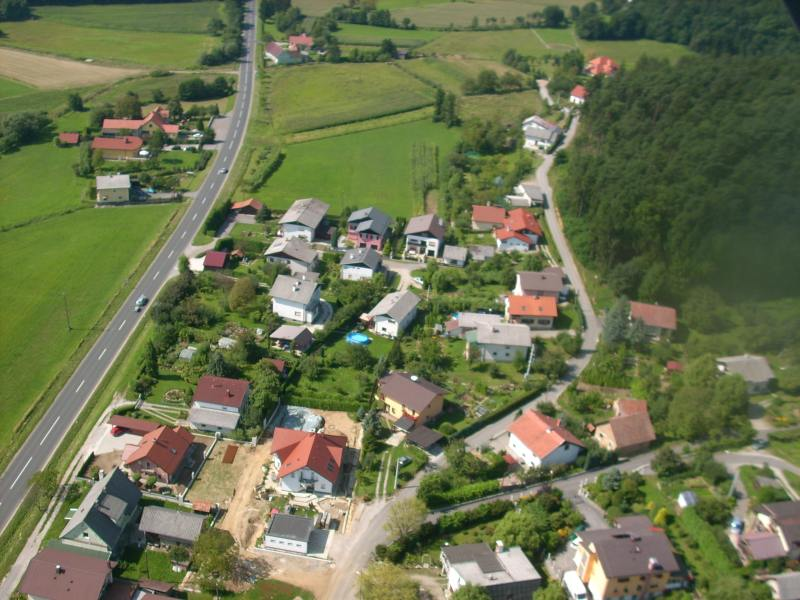

- Location in Slovenia
- Coordinates: 46°28′19.1″N 15°39′13.27″E
- Country: Slovenia
- Traditional region: Styria
- Statistical region: Drava
- Municipality: Hoče–Slivnica

Area
  - Total: 2.74 km^{2} (1.06 sq mi)
- Elevation: 290 m (950 ft)

Population (2002)
  - Total: 1,582

Radizel (pronounced [ˈɾaːdizɛl]) is a settlement in the Municipality of Hoče–Slivnica in northeastern Slovenia. It lies at the eastern foothills of the Pohorje range south of Maribor. The area is part of the traditional region of Styria. The entire municipality is now included in the Drava Statistical Region.
