= Čreta, Hoče–Slivnica =

Čreta
- Location in Slovenia
- Coordinates: 46°28′26.65″N 15°38′29.03″E
- Country: Slovenia
- Traditional region: Styria
- Statistical region: Drava
- Municipality: Hoče–Slivnica

Area
  - Total: 3.52 km^{2} (1.36 sq mi)
- Elevation: 300 m (980 ft)

Population (2002)
  - Total: 294

Čreta (pronounced [ˈtʃɾeːta]) is a settlement in the Municipality of Hoče–Slivnica in northeastern Slovenia. It lies in the eastern foothills of the Pohorje Hills south of Maribor. The area is part of the traditional region of Styria. The municipality is now included in the Drava Statistical Region.

An Iron Age and Roman-period hill fort, with its associated burial ground containing around 35 burial mounds, has been identified near the settlement.
