= Rogoza =

- Location in Slovenia
- Coordinates: 46°29′59.97″N 15°41′2.92″E
- Country: Slovenia
- Traditional region: Styria
- Statistical region: Drava
- Municipality: Hoče-Slivnica

Area
  - Total: 4.73 km^{2} (1.83 sq mi)
- Elevation: 266.4 m (874 ft)

Population (2002)
  - Total: 1,187

Rogoza (pronounced [ɾɔˈɡoːza]) is a settlement in the Municipality of Hoče-Slivnica in northeastern Slovenia. It lies on the flatlands on the right bank of the Drava River between Spodnje Hoče and Miklavž na Dravskem Polju. The area is part of the traditional region of Styria. The municipality is now included in the Drava Statistical Region.

After the Second World War, a Yugoslav labor camp for political prisoners operated in Rogoza.

In 1998 and 1999, during the preparations for the construction of the Maribor eastern bypass section of the A1 Motorway that runs just west of the settlement, Bronze Age and Iron Age sites were identified near the settlement.
