= Polana, Hoče–Slivnica =

Polana
- Location in Slovenia
- Coordinates: 46°29′0.26″N 15°36′37.72″E
- Country: Slovenia
- Traditional region: Styria
- Statistical region: Drava
- Municipality: Hoče–Slivnica

Area
  - Total: 1.26 km^{2} (0.49 sq mi)
- Elevation: 379.4 m (1,245 ft)

Population (2002)
  - Total: 240

Polana (pronounced [pɔˈlaːna]) is a settlement in the Municipality of Hoče–Slivnica in northeastern Slovenia. It lies in the eastern part of the Pohorje Hills. The area is part of the traditional region of Styria. The municipality is now included in the Drava Statistical Region.
