= Hočko Pohorje =

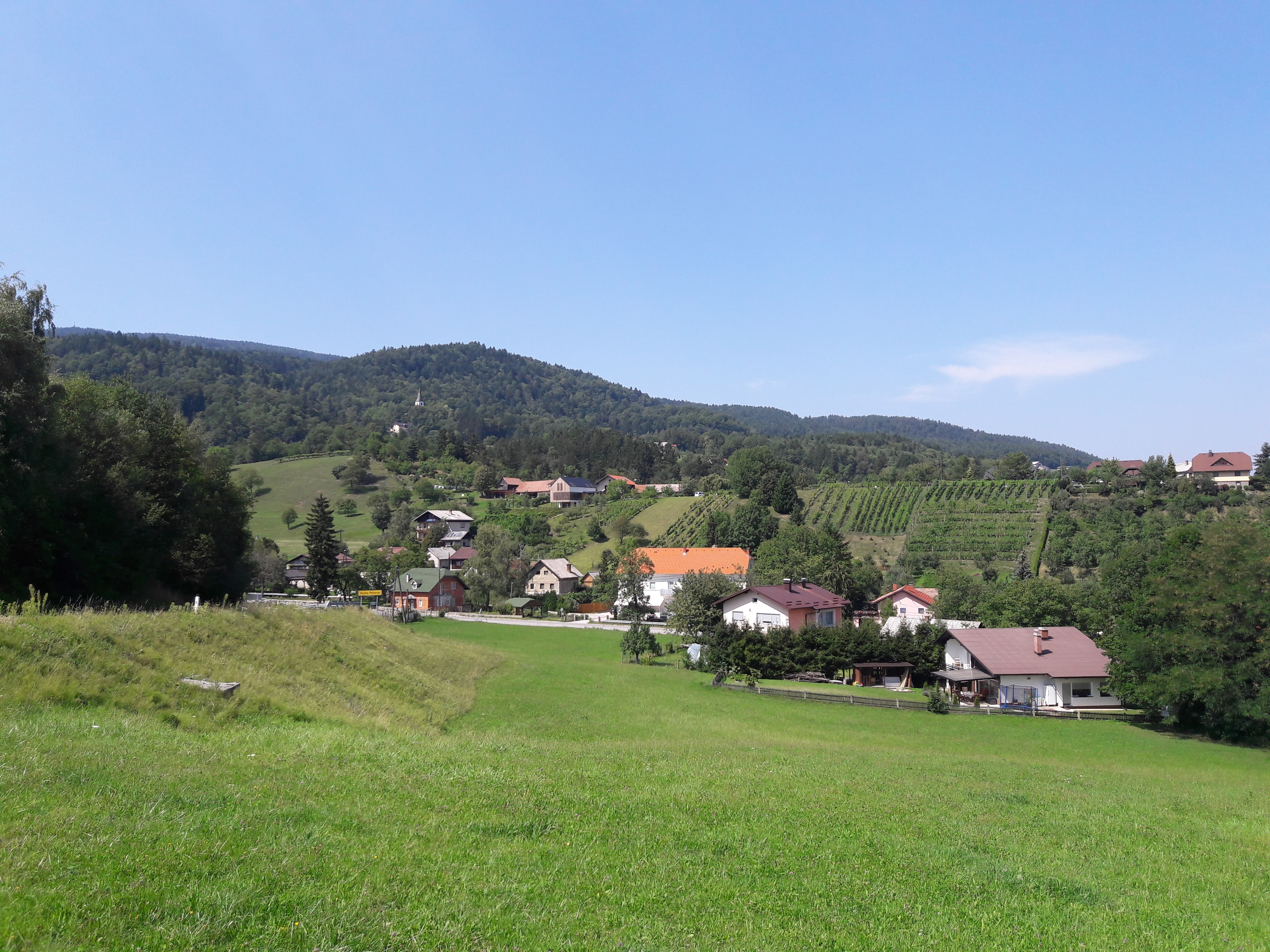
- Hočko Pohorje

- Location in Slovenia
- Coordinates: 46°30′1.25″N 15°34′13.47″E
- Country: Slovenia
- Traditional region: Styria
- Statistical region: Drava
- Municipality: Hoče–Slivnica

Area
  - Total: 11.34 km^{2} (4.38 sq mi)
- Elevation: 838.6 m (2,751 ft)

Population (2002)
  - Total: 416

Hočko Pohorje (pronounced [ˈxoːtʃkɔ ˈpóːxɔɾjɛ]) is a settlement in the Municipality of Hoče-Slivnica in northeastern Slovenia. It lies in the eastern Pohorje Hills south of Maribor. The area is part of the traditional region of Styria. The municipality is now included in the Drava Statistical Region.

== Mass grave ==
Hočko Pohorje is the site of a mass grave from the period immediately after the Second World War. The Hočko Pohorje Mass Grave (Slovene: Grobišče Hočko Pohorje) is located at two sites north of the hamlet of Legvanjčani in the neighboring settlement of Slivniško Pohorje, marked by wooden poles 50 centimeters (20 in) tall. The first site is a depression left of a cross, measuring 3.5 by 1.5 meters (11.5 ft × 4.9 ft). The second is right of the cross and measures 2.5 by 1.5 meters (8 ft 2 in × 4 ft 11 in). They contain the remains of civilians and/or prisoners of war transported to the Pohorje Hills from Maribor and its surroundings and murdered in May and June 1945.

== Radar tower ==
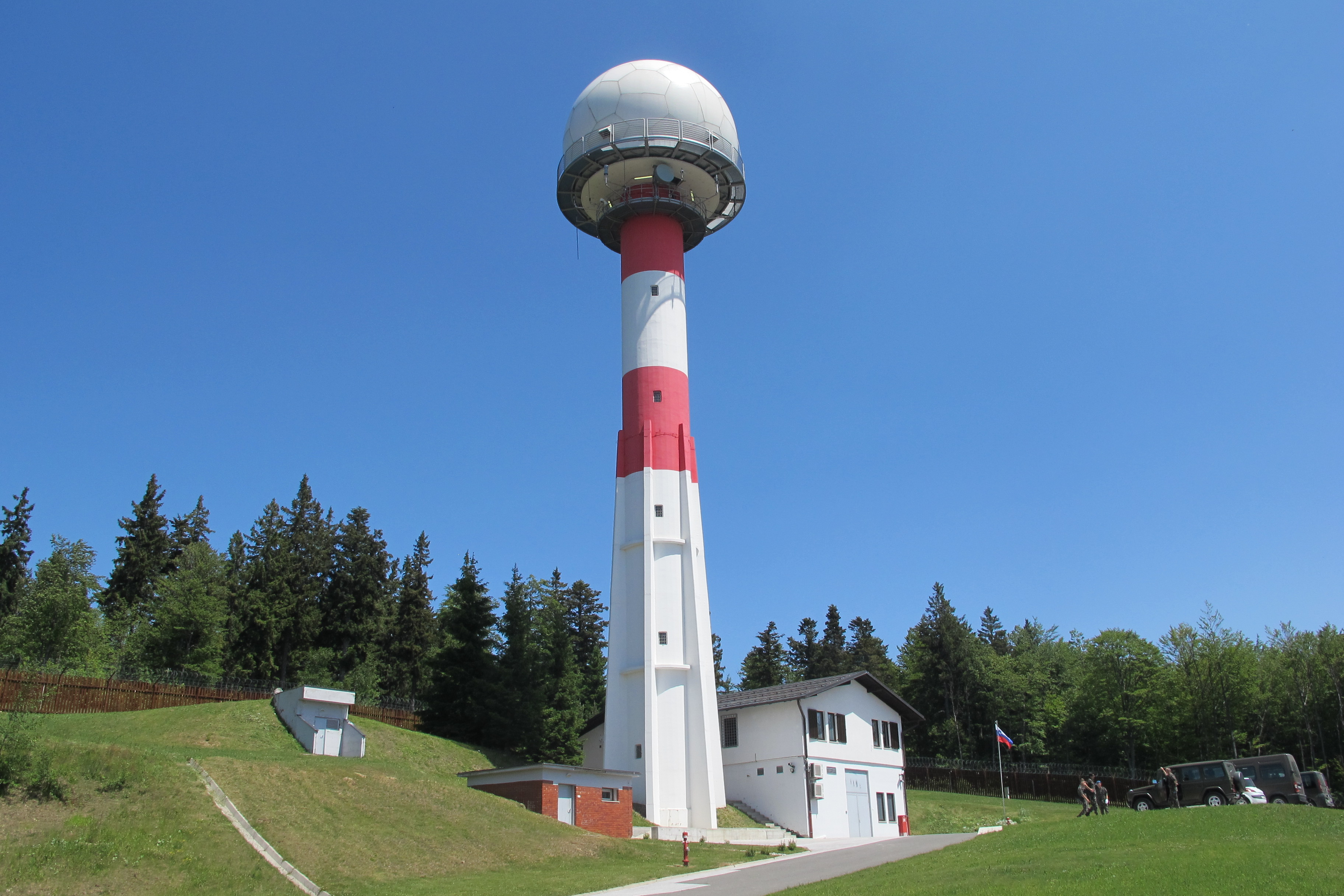
The radar tower at Ledinekov Kogel

The Slovene military radar station RP-2 (RP stands for radarska postaja 'radar station') is located at Ledinekov Kogel, a hill in the territory of Hočko Pohorje. It is managed by the 16th Air Space Surveillance Battalion and operates a long-range radar of the model Ground Master 403 that along another such radar at Ljubljana Peak in Mirke (central Slovenia) covers the Slovene air-space. The radar station at Ledinekov Kogel was built in 2005 and initially operated a radar of the model AN/TPS-70, whereas the GM 403 radar was set up in 2011.
