= Municipality of Hoče-Slivnica =

Municipality of Slovenia

Municipality of Hoče–Slivnica Občina Hoče - Slivnica
- Municipality
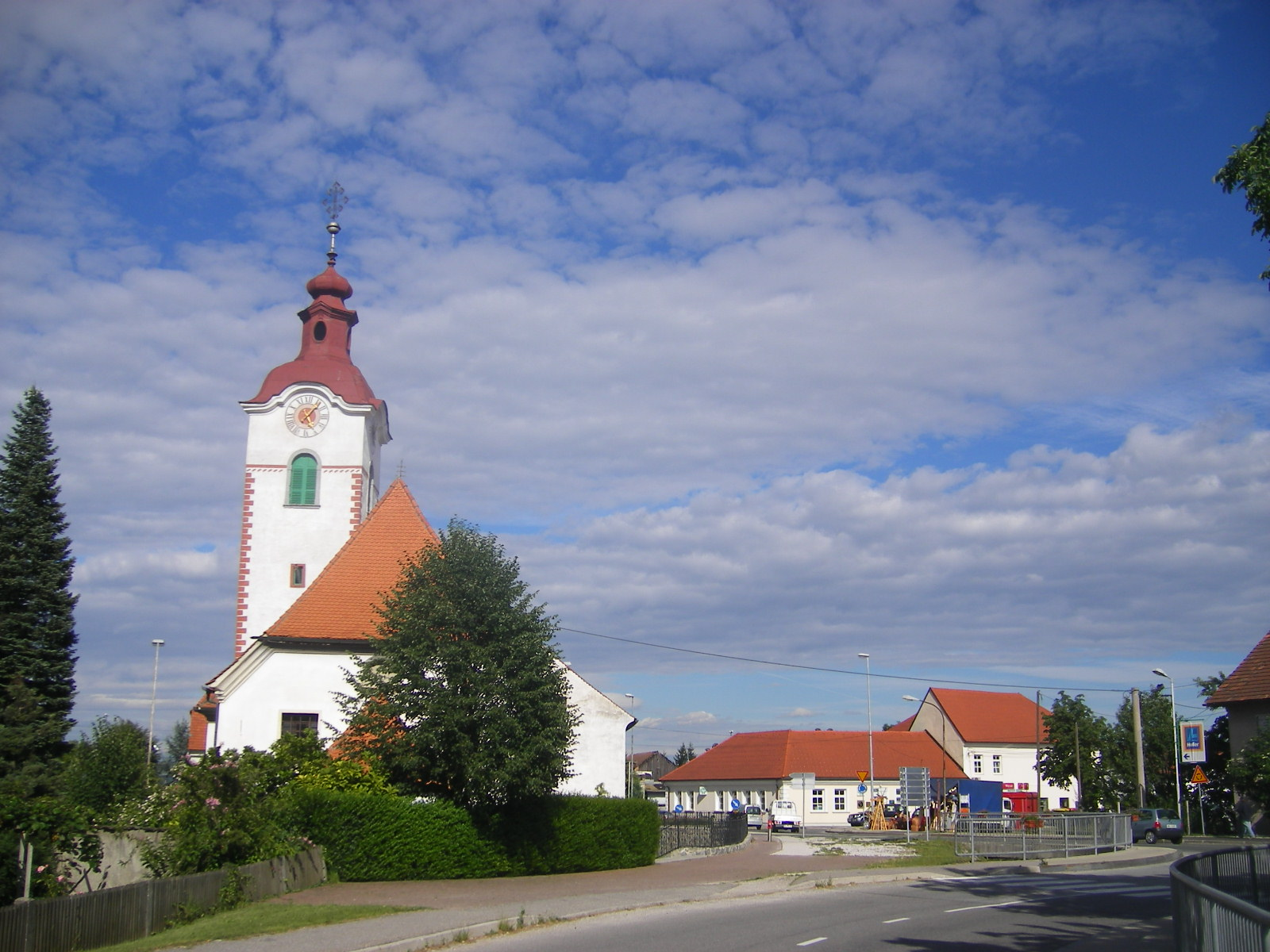
- Spodnje Hoče

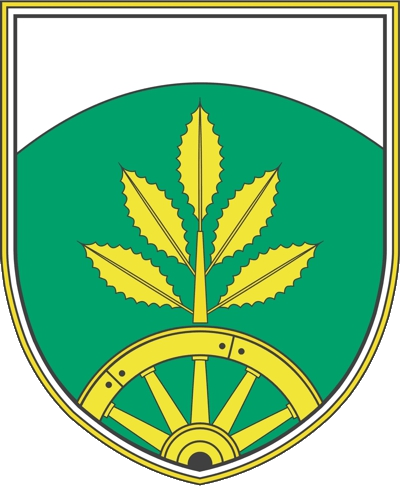
- Coat of arms

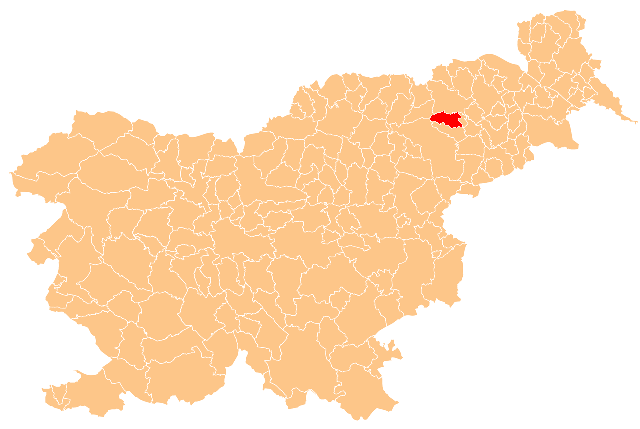
- Location of the Municipality of Hoče-Slivnica in Slovenia
- Coordinates: 46°29′N 15°40′E
- Country: Slovenia

Government
  - Mayor: Marko Soršak (Independent)

Area
  - Total: 53.7 km^{2} (20.7 sq mi)

Population (2023)
  - Total: 11,885
  - Density: 221/km^{2} (573/sq mi)
- Time zone: UTC+01 (CET)
  - Summer (DST): UTC+02 (CEST)
- Website: www.hoce-slivnica.si

The Municipality of Hoče–Slivnica (pronounced [ˈxòːtʃɛ ˈslíːwnitsa, ˈxóː-]; Slovene: Občina Hoče - Slivnica) is a municipality south of Maribor in northeastern Slovenia. Its administrative seat is Spodnje Hoče.

== Geography ==
The area is part of the traditional region of Lower Styria. It is now included in the Drava Statistical Region. The municipality extends from the flatlands on the right bank of the Drava River into the Pohorje Hills. The motorway and railway line from Ljubljana to Maribor run through the municipality.

=== Settlements ===
In addition to the municipal seat of Spodnje Hoče, the municipality also includes the following settlements:

- Bohova
- Čreta
- Hočko Pohorje
- Hotinja Vas
- Orehova Vas
- Pivola
- Polana
- Radizel
- Rogoza
- Slivnica pri Mariboru
- Slivniško Pohorje
- Zgornje Hoče
