= Zgornje Hoče =

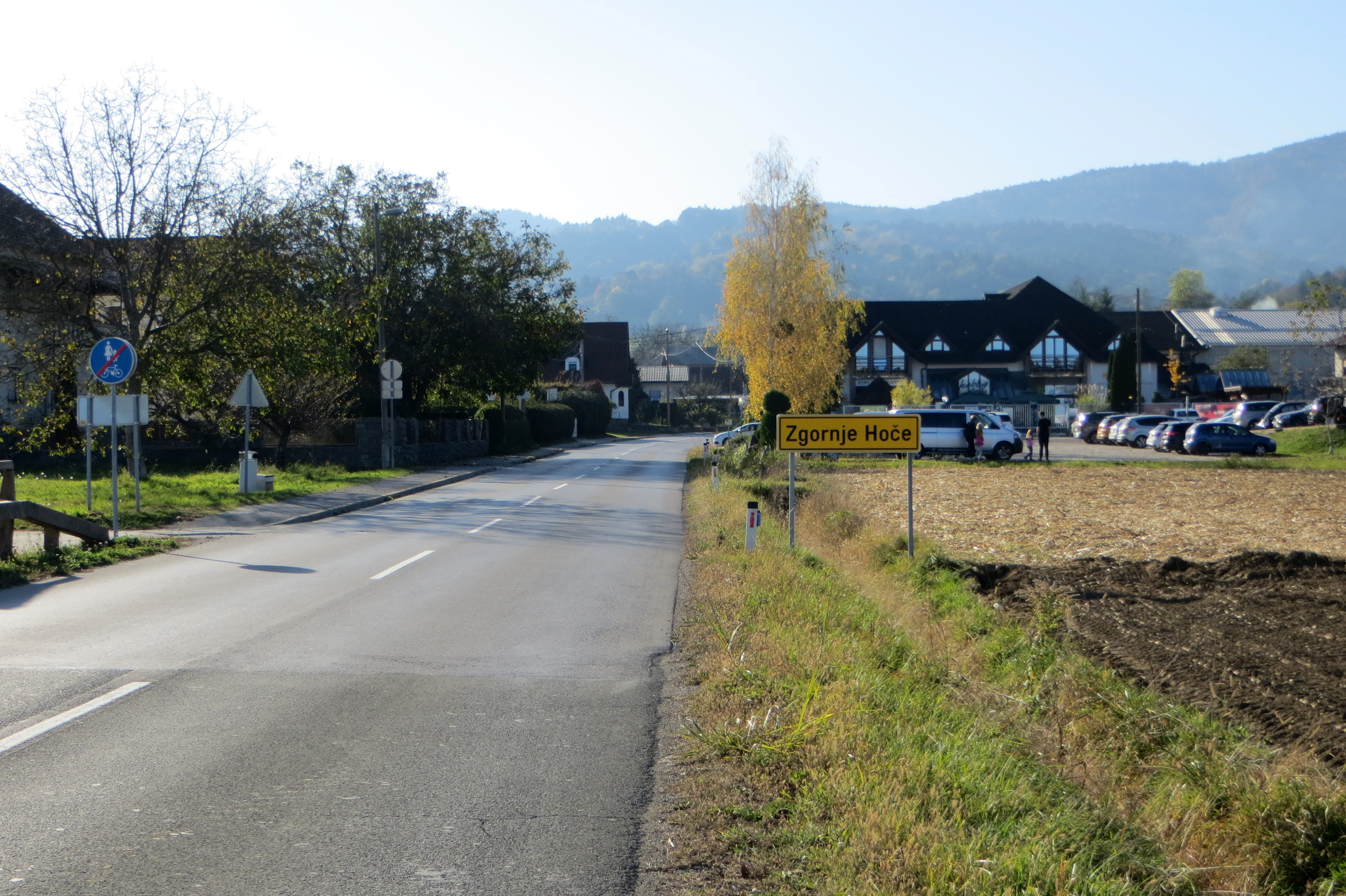

- Location in Slovenia
- Coordinates: 46°29′27.49″N 15°37′31.95″E
- Country: Slovenia
- Traditional region: Styria
- Statistical region: Drava
- Municipality: Hoče–Slivnica

Area
  - Total: 1.63 km^{2} (0.63 sq mi)
- Elevation: 319.2 m (1,047 ft)

Population (2002)
  - Total: 620

Zgornje Hoče (pronounced [ˈzɡóːɾnjɛ ˈxòːtʃɛ, - ˈxóː-]) is a settlement in the Municipality of Hoče–Slivnica in northeastern Slovenia. It lies at the eastern foothills of the Pohorje range south of Maribor. The area is part of the traditional region of Styria. The municipality is now included in the Drava Statistical Region.

== Name ==
The name Zgornje Hoče literally means 'upper Hoče', contrasting with neighboring Spodnje Hoče (literally, 'lower Hoče'). The name was attested in 1146 as de Choz (and as de Chotsse in 1181 and de Chosse in 1214). The name is originally a plural demonym (*Xoťane) derived from the nickname *Xotъ (based on a longer name such as *Xotimirъ).

== Cultural heritage ==
A chapel-shrine with a small belfry in the northwestern part of the settlement was built in the late 19th century.
