= Pohorje Transmitter =

Radio and TV-broadcasting facility in the Pohorje Mountains

Coordinates: 46°30′53.24″N 15°34′40.01″E

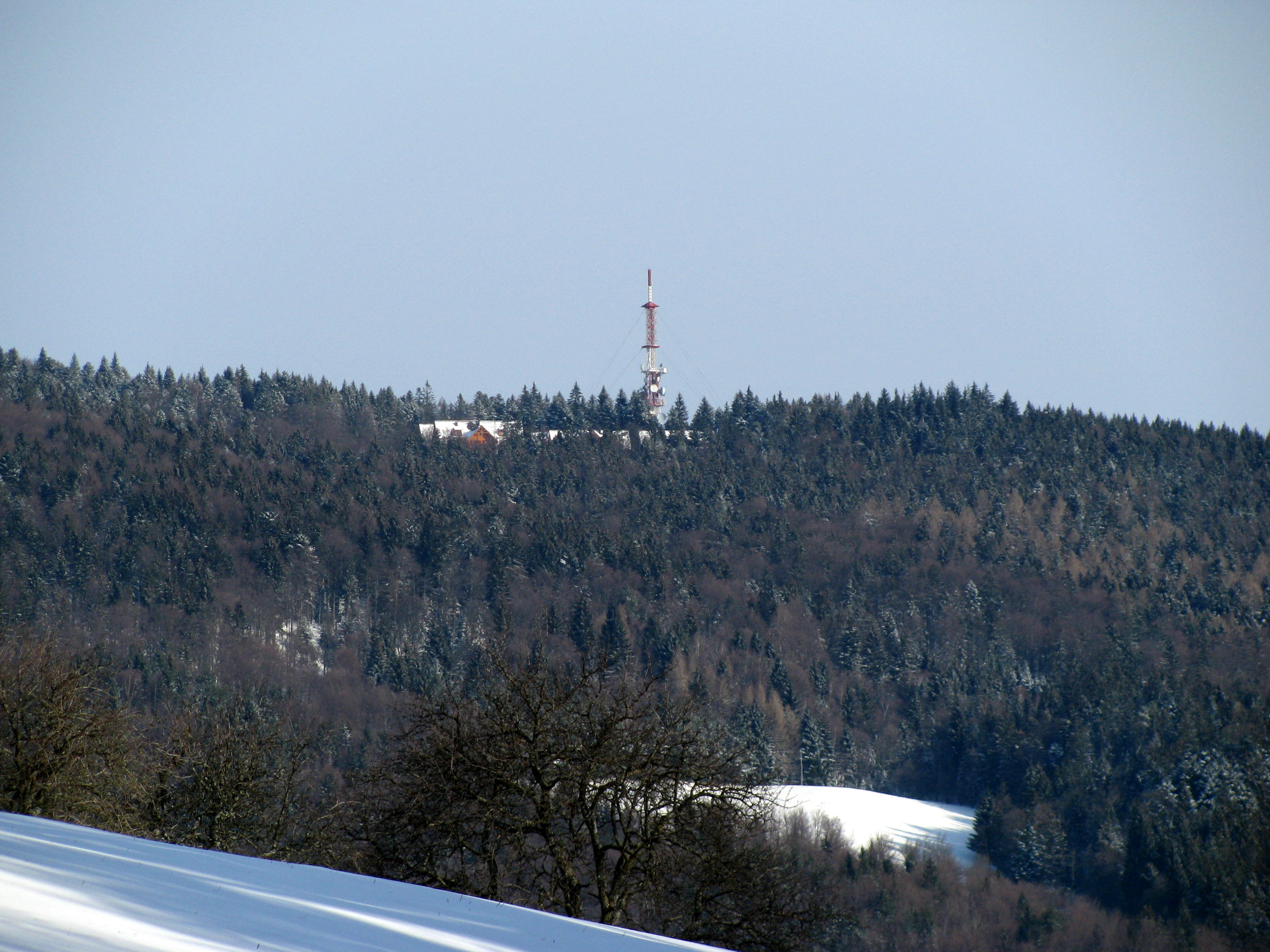

The Pohorje Transmitter (also known as Maribor 1) is a facility for radio and TV-broadcasting in the Pohorje Mountains west of Maribor, northeastern Slovenia, 1,056 metres (3,465 ft) above sea level. It uses a 72 m (236 ft) tall lattice tower. Although this tower is designed as free-standing, it is guyed at two levels in six directions. This extensive additional guying is unusual, especially considering that the tower is not very tall and that it is situated in a forest area.

== Radiated programmes ==
=== Analogue radio (FM) ===
Frequency (MHz)	Programme	RDS PS	RDS PI	Regionalisation	ERP (kW)	Antenna diagram round (ND)/pointed (D)	Polarization horizontal (H)/vertical (V)
88,5	Radio Slovenija 1	__PRVI__	9201	–	5	D (70–250°)	H/V
93,1	Radio Maribor	MARIBOR_	9426	–	3	D (110–220°)	H
96,9	Val 202	VAL_202_	9202	–	3	D (70–250°)	H/V
102,8	Radio SI	RADIO_SI	933A	–	8	D (70–250°)	H/V
105,3	ARS	__ARS___	9203	–	2	D (70–250°)	H/V

=== Digital radio (DAB+) ===
Pohorje makes up a single-frequency network (SFN) with 6 other transmitters (Krim, Krvavec, Nanos, Plešivec, Tinjan and Trdinov vrh). In summer 2016 the SFN covered 89% of highways and 67% of households for indoor reception with a portable receiver. Programs use HE-AAC v2 audiocodec.

Channel	Frequency (MHz)	Multiplex	Programmes	ERP (kW)	Antenna diagram Non-directional (ND) / Directional (D)	Polarization horizontal (H) / vertical (V)
10D	215.072	R1	Radio Slovenija 1 - Prvi; Radio Slovenija 2 - VAL202; Radio Slovenija 3 - ARS; Radio Slovenia International; Radio Ognjišče; Radio Center; Radio 1; Radio 1 80-a; Rock Radio; Radio Veseljak; Net FM; Radio Študent; Radio City; Radio Ekspres; Radio Aktual; Radio Salomon	<5 (Note: 5kW allowed/coordinated but real ERP is lower)	3 lobes (25°, 115°, 205°)	V

Channel	Frequency (MHz)	Multiplex	Programmes	ERP (kW)	Antenna diagram Non-directional (ND) / Directional (D)	Polarization horizontal (H) / vertical (V)
12B	225.648	R2 E	Radio Maribor; Pomurski madžarski radio; Radio Krka; Koroški radio; Radio Ptuj; Radio Murski val; Radio Sraka; Radio Maxi; Radio Aktual Kum; Radio Celje; Štajerski val; Radio BOB; Radio Antena; Radio Velenje; Radio Fantasy	<5 (Note: 5kW allowed/coordinated but real ERP is lower)	3 lobes (25°, 115°, 205°)	V

There are 2 reports of a successful long-distance reception of the multiplex from this transmitter in Slovakia in Skalica and near Topoľčany, 290 km away.

=== Digital television (DVB-T) ===
Channel	Frequency (MHz)	Multiplex	Programmes	ERP (kW)	Antenna diagram round (ND) / pointed (D)	Polarization horizontal (H) / vertical (V)
27	522	Mux A (Vzhod)	TV SLO 1 HD; TV SLO 2 HD; TV SLO 3 HD; TV Maribor; TV Koper	100	ND	H
37	602	Mux C	TV Veseljak; Nova24TV; Fox Life; Fox Crime; Fox Movies; National Geographic; Viasat History; Pop TV; Kanal A; Brio; Kino; Oto; Obvestilo C	100	ND	H

Until the middle of 2012 Mux B from Norkring was broadcasting on channel 67. The operator left the Slovenian market.

=== Analogue television (PAL) ===
Analogue channels were broadcast until 1 December 2010.

Channel	Frequency (MHz)	Programmes	ERP (kW)	Antenna diagram round (ND)/ pointed (D)	Polarization horizontal (H)/ vertical (V)
11	215,25	SLO 1	30	D (90°)	H
56	751,25	SLO 2	800	ND	H
59	775,25	POP TV	1000	ND	H

== See also ==
- Additionally guyed tower
- List of towers
