= Hotinja Vas =

- Location in Slovenia
- Coordinates: 46°28′3.07″N 15°40′19.45″E
- Country: Slovenia
- Traditional region: Styria
- Statistical region: Drava
- Municipality: Hoče–Slivnica

Area
  - Total: 3.86 km^{2} (1.49 sq mi)
- Elevation: 262.4 m (861 ft)

Population (2002)
  - Total: 1,295

Hotinja Vas (pronounced [xɔˈtiːnja ˈʋaːs]; Slovene: Hotinja vas) is a village in the Municipality of Hoče–Slivnica in northeastern Slovenia. It lies on the edge of the flatlands on the right bank of the Drava River south of Maribor. The area is part of the traditional region of Styria. The municipality is now included in the Drava Statistical Region.

The village chapel-shrine dates to 1921.
