= Black Peak (Pohorje) =

Mountain in Slovenia

- Location within Slovenia

Highest point
- Elevation: 1,543 m (5,062 ft)
- Prominence: 945 m ↓ Mislinja
- Isolation: 20.8 km → Uršlja Gora
- Coordinates: 46°29′10″N 15°13′59″E

Geography
- Location: Slovenia
- Parent range: Pohorje

Black Peak (Slovene: Črni Vrh, German: Schwarzkogel) is a mountain (elevation 1,543 metres or 5,062 feet) and the highest peak in the Pohorje or Bacher Mountains in Slovenia.

== Location and nature ==
Black Peak lies northeast of Mislinja and much of it is covered in forest. From its treeless summit there are views to Slovenj Gradec to the west, about 12 kilometres (7.5 mi) away, and the Rogla winter sports centre 8 kilometres (5.0 mi) as the crow flies to the southeast. The mountain is about 15 kilometres (9.3 mi) from Slovenia's border with Austria.
