= Slivniško Pohorje =

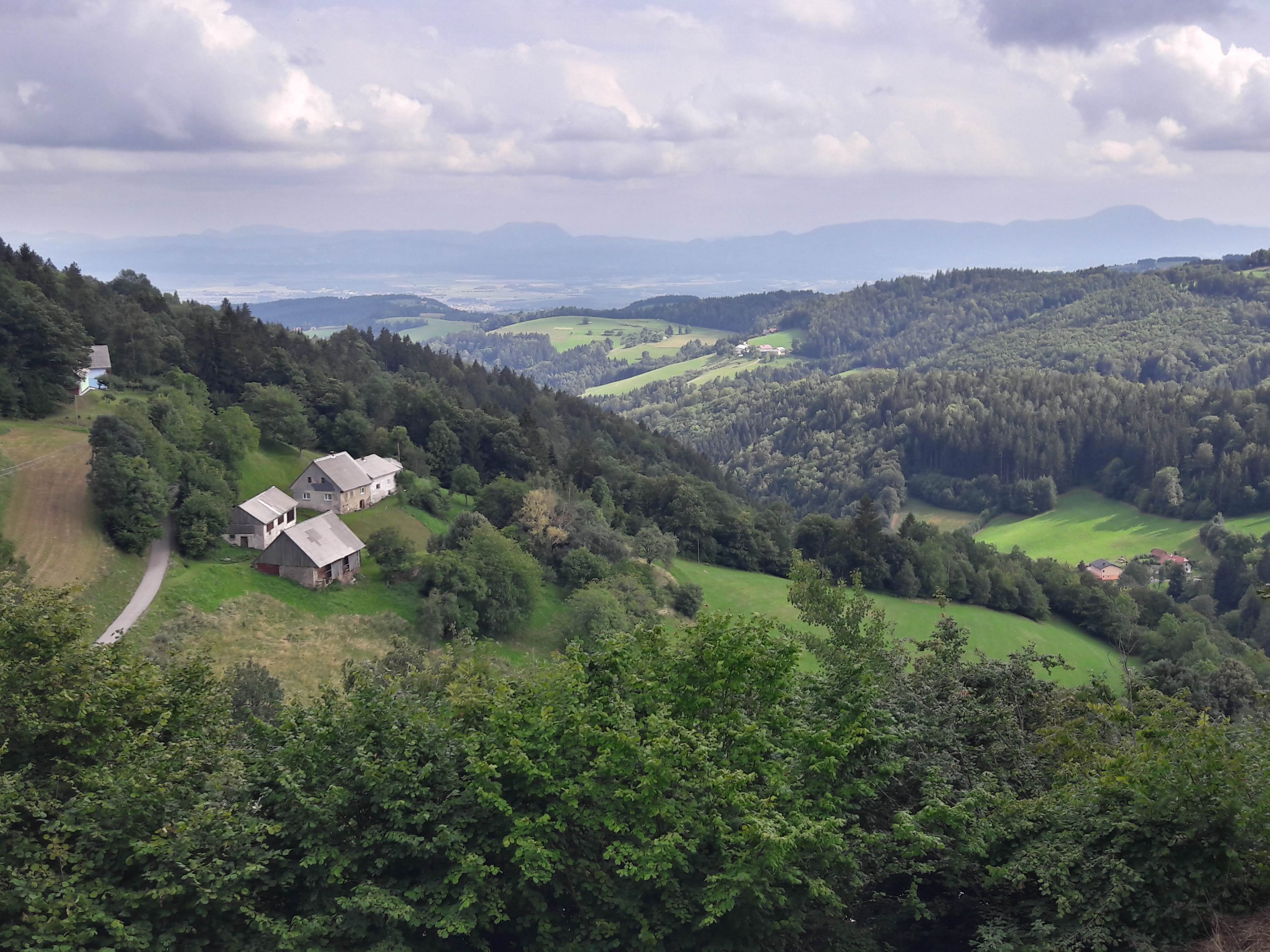

- Location in Slovenia
- Coordinates: 46°28′58.94″N 15°34′37.67″E
- Country: Slovenia
- Traditional region: Styria
- Statistical region: Drava
- Municipality: Hoče–Slivnica

Area
  - Total: 7.2 km^{2} (2.8 sq mi)
- Elevation: 725.6 m (2,381 ft)

Population (2002)
  - Total: 162

Slivniško Pohorje (pronounced [ˈslíːwniʃkɔ ˈpóːxɔɾjɛ]) is a settlement in the Pohorje Hills south of Maribor in northeastern Slovenia. It lies in the Municipality of Hoče–Slivnica, part of the traditional region of Styria. The municipality is now included in the Drava Statistical Region.

== Mass graves ==
Slivniško Pohorje is the site of five known mass graves from the period immediately after the Second World War. They all contain the remains of a large number of civilians of various nationalities and prisoners of war transported to the Pohorje Hills and murdered in May and June 1945. The Slivniško Pohorje Mass Grave (Slovene: Grobišče Slivniško Pohorje) is located in the ravine of a tributary of Polana Creek (Polanski potok), a few dozen meters below the turnoff for the Plahutnik farm (Slivniško Pohorje no. 8). Four additional mass graves lie along the main road in the western part of the settlement. The Lebe Clearing 1–3 mass graves (Lebejeva frata 1–3) are clustered together north of the road. The Raščenek Beeches Mass Grave (Raščenkova bukva) lies south of the road.
