= Slivna =

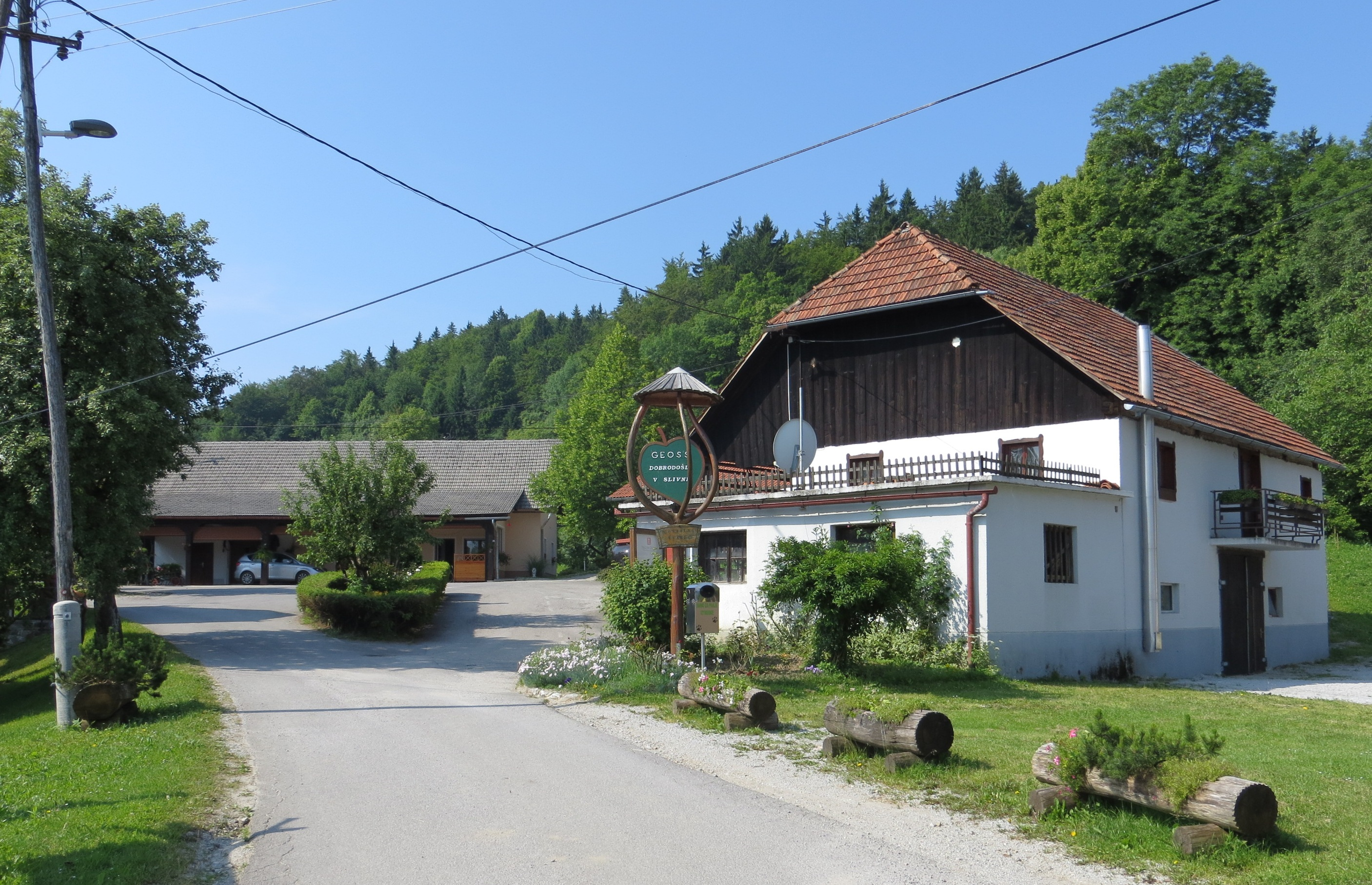

- Location in Slovenia
- Coordinates: 46°7′20.96″N 14°48′56.21″E
- Country: Slovenia
- Traditional region: Upper Carniola
- Statistical region: Central Sava
- Municipality: Litija

Area
  - Total: 3.47 km^{2} (1.34 sq mi)
- Elevation: 626.6 m (2,056 ft)

Population (2002)
  - Total: 136
- Postal code: 1252

Slivna (pronounced [ˈsliːu̯na]) is a settlement west of Vače in the Municipality of Litija in central Slovenia. The area is part of the traditional region of Upper Carniola. It is now included with the rest of the municipality in the Central Sava Statistical Region. The settlement is the Geometric Centre of the Republic of Slovenia.

== Church ==
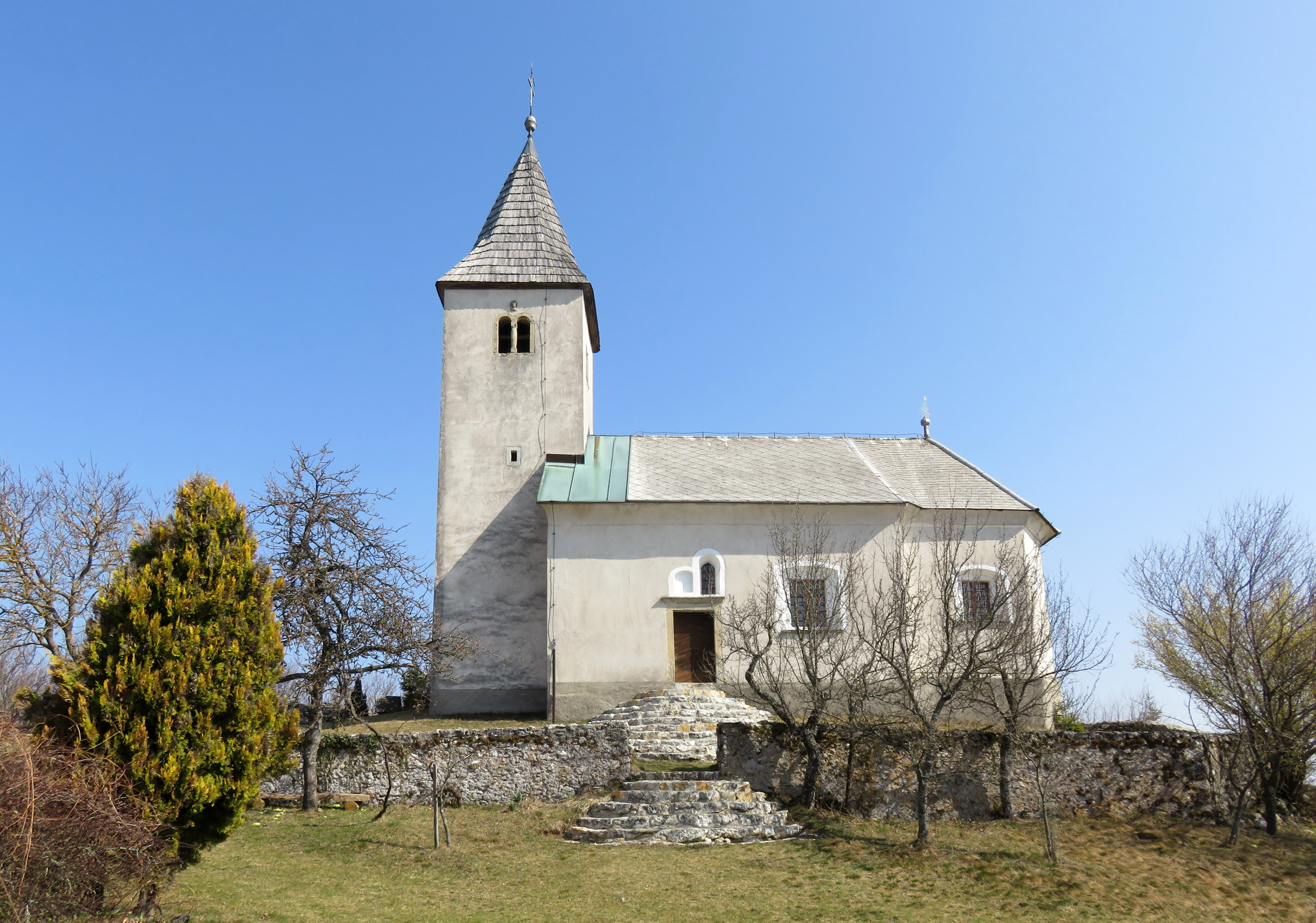
Saint Agnes's Church

The local church, built in the hamlet of Zgornja Slivna, is dedicated to Saint Agnes (Slovene: sveta Neža) and belongs to the Parish of Vače. It is a late 14th-century church that was restyled in the Baroque in the late 17th to early 18th centuries.
