= Online map services of Slovenia =

Online map services of Slovenia are based on data provided by the Surveying and Mapping Authority of the Republic of Slovenia, such as orthophoto covering entire territory of Slovenia with detailed imagery taken from a plane rather than satellite, and combine them with additional contents that are of interest to tourists and residents of Slovenia. Orthophoto images are taken every second year and provide more detailed aerial view of entire territory whereas satellite imagery shown by Google Maps only use detailed images for city areas and along major roads, but not for the entire territory. This is why orthophoto images are cited by geographers to show environmental change, rather than images taken by satellites that are shown on Google Maps.

Najdi.si combines orthophoto maps (despite its aerial view tab being named "satellite") with other contents, such as traffic info, city bus lines for Ljubljana and Maribor, and current info on the number of available bikes at BicikeLJ stations in Ljubljana.

Geopedia.si offers a number of maps, including:

- city maps from 19th century and architectural heritage in Ljubljana on geolocated 19th century postcards with comments from the book A pictorial chronicle of a capital city,
- interactive archaeological map of Emona on top of (orthophoto) map of Ljubljana,
- cultural places of interest,
- cultural events (in museums etc.) happening in the next 7 days,
- paragliding info mapping service,
- online natural hazards monitoring mapping service.
