= Kot pri Damlju =

- Location in Slovenia
- Coordinates: 45°25′20.54″N 15°10′37.09″E
- Country: Slovenia
- Traditional region: White Carniola
- Statistical region: Southeast Slovenia
- Municipality: Črnomelj

Area
  - Total: 0.9 km^{2} (0.35 sq mi)

Population (2020)
  - Total: 11
  - Density: 12/km^{2} (32/sq mi)
- Postal code: 8333

Kot pri Damlju (pronounced [ˈkoːt pɾi ˈdaːmlju]) is a small village in the Municipality of Črnomelj in southeastern Slovenia. Until 2000, the area was part of the settlement of Damelj. The village is part of the traditional region of White Carniola and is included in the Southeast Slovenia Statistical Region.

== Geography ==
Kot pri Damlju is the southernmost settlement in Slovenia.

== Sports ==
The Gorski Kotar Bike Tour, held annually since 2012, sometimes goes through Kot, such as in the first leg for 2024.
