= Bohova, Hoče–Slivnica =

Bohova
- Location in Slovenia
- Coordinates: 46°30′32.94″N 15°39′24.35″E
- Country: Slovenia
- Traditional region: Styria
- Statistical region: Drava
- Municipality: Hoče–Slivnica

Area
  - Total: 2.39 km^{2} (0.92 sq mi)
- Elevation: 275 m (902 ft)

Population (2002)
  - Total: 234

Bohova (pronounced [bɔˈxɔːʋa]) is a settlement in the Municipality of Hoče–Slivnica south of Maribor in northeastern Slovenia. The area is part of the traditional region of Styria. The municipality is now included in the Drava Statistical Region.

== Name ==
Bohova was attested in written records in 1255 as Bochew, and in 1441 as Wokaw. Like related Slavic place names (e.g., Bochowo in Poland and Bochov in the Czech Republic), the name is derived from the Slavic personal name *Boxъ, referring to early ownership or association with the place. Another conjecture regarding the origin of the name is that it refers to sides of bacon (Slovene: boh), which the village produced for sale in Maribor.

== History ==
=== Roman period ===
During the construction of the A1 Motorway in 1995 evidence of Roman-period settlement was uncovered near the village. The site was merely identified and not properly excavated or further investigated.

=== Mass grave ===
Bohova is the site of a mass grave associated with the Second World War. The Bohova Mass Grave (Slovene: Grobišče Bohova) is located in the Marof Woods (Marofski les) 150 meters (490 ft) southeast of the freeway. It contains the remains of undetermined victims.

=== Post–World War II ===
In 1958, the Slovenija Sadje company converted a prewar slaughterhouse in the settlement into a refrigeration unit for meat and fruit. The premises were set up for processing fruit juices, primarily for export. The fire station in Bohova was renovated in 1977.

== Cultural heritage ==
The village has a wayside shrine dating to the second half of the 18th century, and a chapel-shrine dating to the first half of the 19th century.

== Notable people ==
Notable people that were born or lived in Bohova include:

- Franjo Čiček (1897–?), writer of children's stories
