= Geometric centre of Slovenia =

Spatial reference point denoting the central position of the country

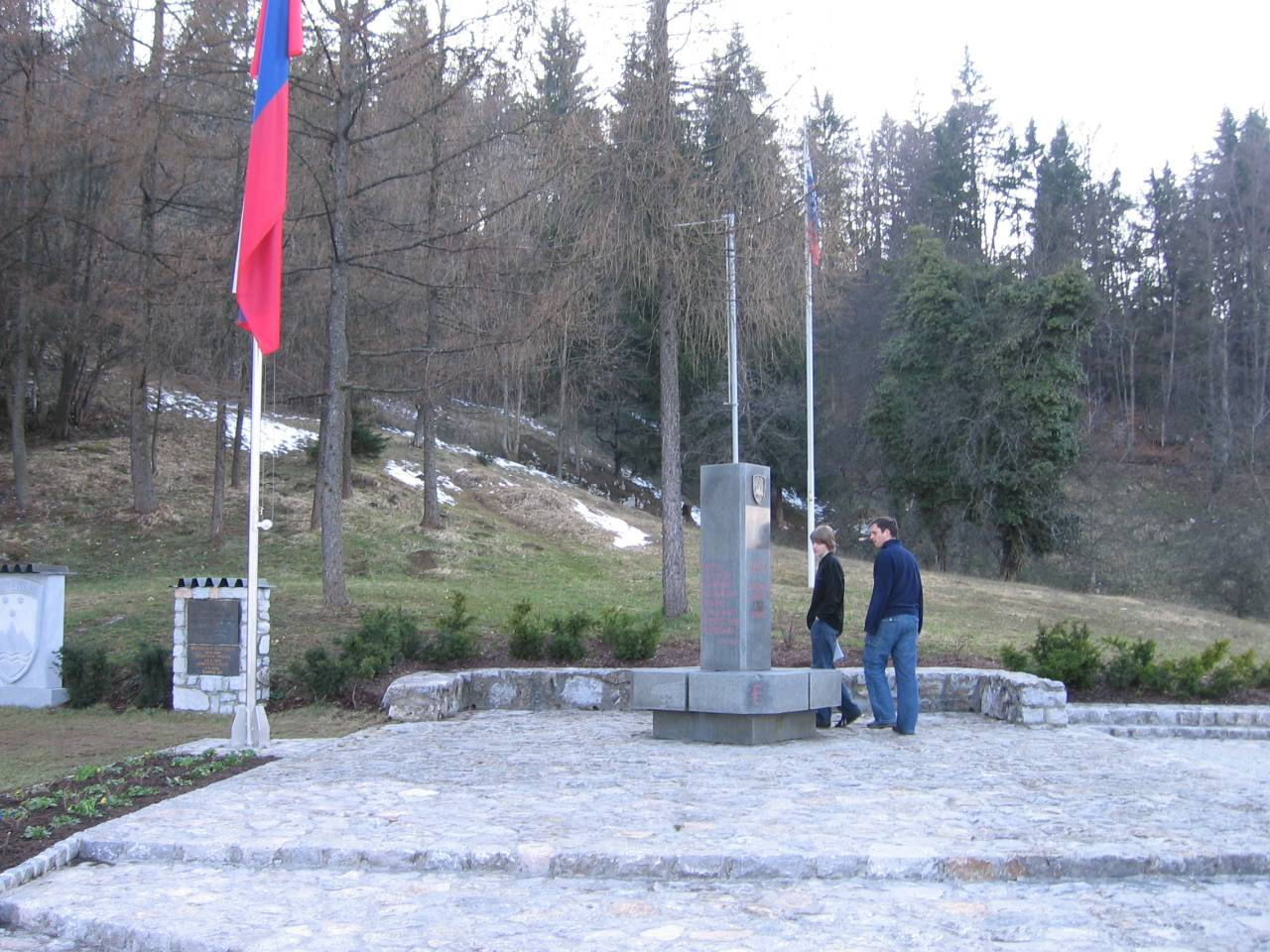
Monument marking the Geometric Centre of Slovenia

Geometric Centre of Slovenia

The Geometric Centre of Slovenia (Slovene: Geometrično središče Slovenije, GEOSS) is the geometric centre of the country. Its geographic coordinates are 46°07′11.8″N 14°48′55.2″E and its elevation is 644.842 m. It lies in the hamlet of Spodnja Slivna near Vače in the Municipality of Litija. Since 4 July 1982, it has been marked with a memorial stone designed by the architect Marjan Božič, about 50 m away from the given coordinates. A plaque reading Živimo in gospodarimo na svoji zemlji ('We live and prosper upon our land') was added on 14 September 1989. In 2003, Slovenia adopted the Geometric Centre of Slovenia Act, which is a unique case in Europe.
