= Bohova, Pernik Province =

Coordinates: 42°45′52″N 22°29′48″E

Bohova is a village in Tran Municipality in western Bulgaria. It is located at the southwestern edge of the Znepole valley. Bohova is located about two kilometers from the border with Serbia.
