= Spodnje Hoče =

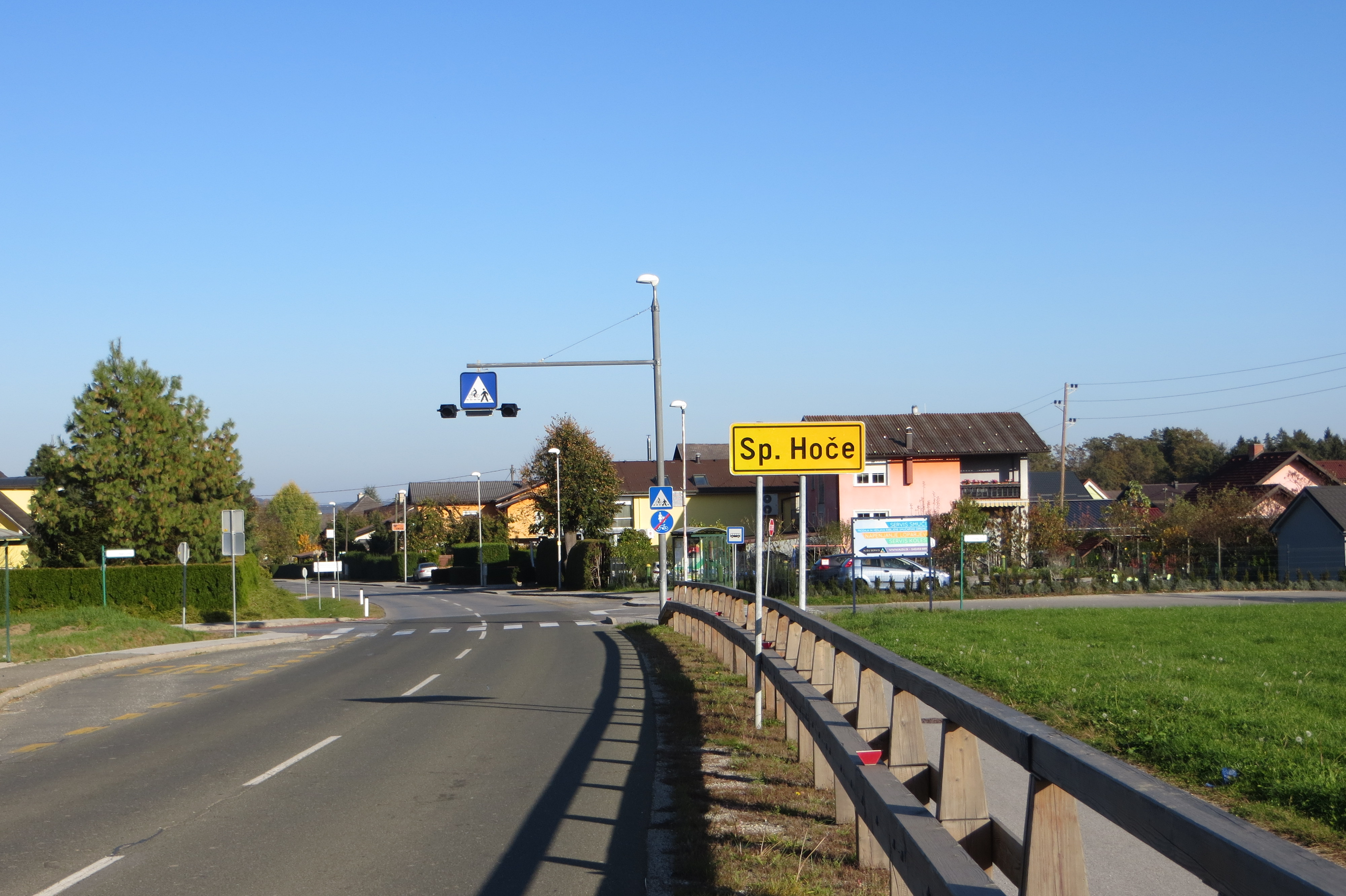

- Flag Seal

- Location in Slovenia
- Coordinates: 46°29′58.48″N 15°38′49.7″E
- Country: Slovenia
- Traditional region: Styria
- Statistical region: Drava
- Municipality: Hoče-Slivnica

Area
  - Total: 4.79 km^{2} (1.85 sq mi)
- Elevation: 298 m (978 ft)

Population (2002)
  - Total: 2,109

Spodnje Hoče (pronounced [ˈspóːdnjɛ ˈxòːtʃɛ, - ˈxóː-]) is a settlement in and the administrative centre of the Municipality of Hoče–Slivnica in northeastern Slovenia. It lies below the eastern Pohorje Hills on the edge of the flatlands on the right bank of the Drava River south of Maribor. The area is part of the traditional region of Styria. The municipality is now included in the Drava Statistical Region.

== Name ==
The name Spodnje Hoče literally means 'lower Hoče', contrasting with neighboring Zgornje Hoče (literally, 'upper Hoče'). The name was attested in 1146 as de Choz (and as de Chotsse in 1181 and de Chosse in 1214). The name is originally a plural demonym (*Xoťane) derived from the nickname *Xotъ (based on a longer name such as *Xotimirъ).

== Church ==
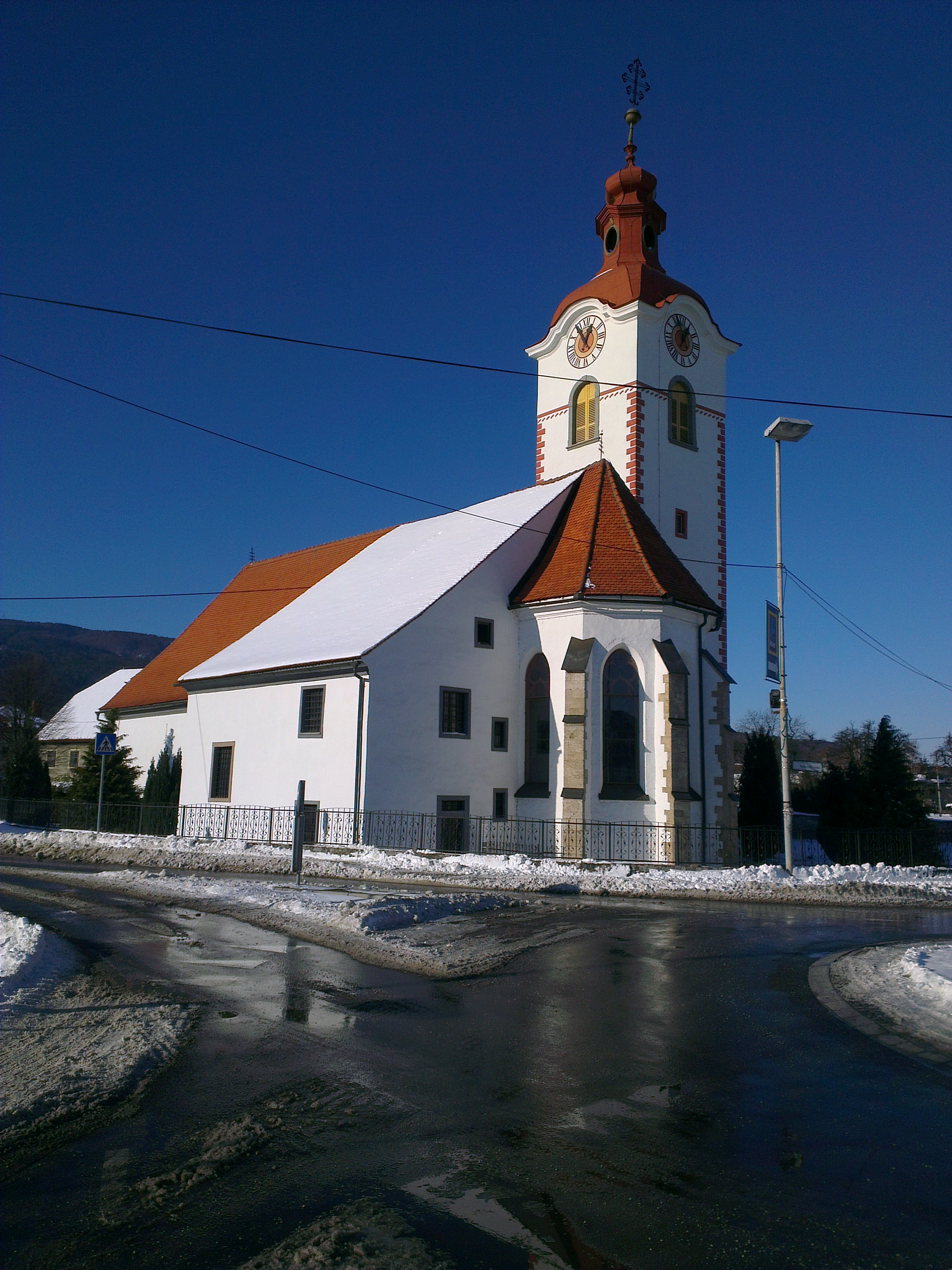
Saint George's Church

The local parish church is dedicated to Saint George (Slovene: sveti Jurij) and belongs to the Roman Catholic Archdiocese of Maribor. It was first mentioned in written documents dating to 1146, but the current building dates to the 15th century.
