= Pohorje =

Mountain range in Slovenia

- Bachergebirge
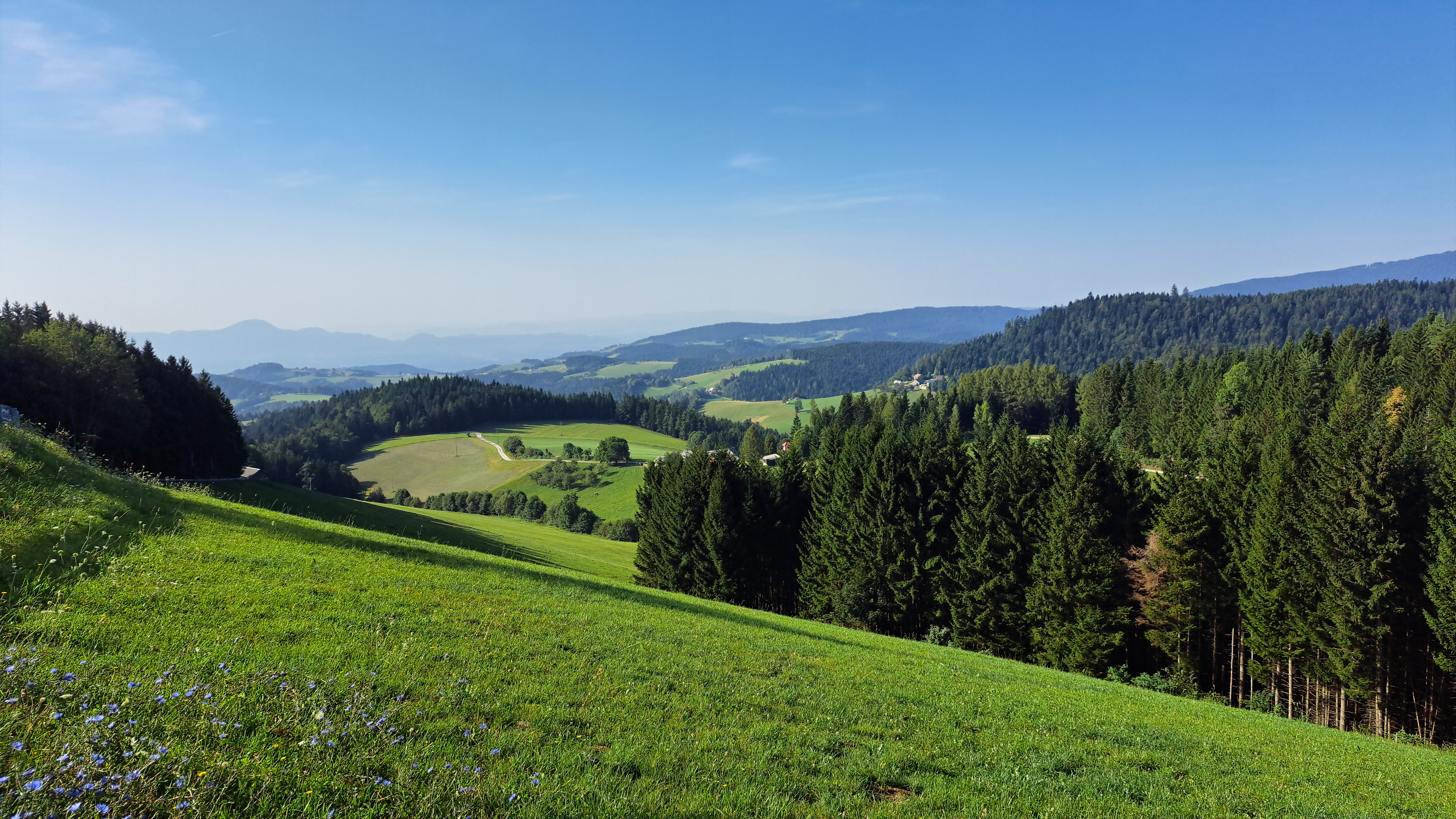
- Pohorje near Maribor

Highest point
- Peak: Black Peak (Črni vrh)
- Elevation: 1,543 m (5,062 ft)
- Coordinates: 46°30′13″N 15°27′11″E

Dimensions
- Length: 50 km (31 mi)
- Width: 30 km (19 mi)
- Area: 840 km^{2} (320 mi^{2})

Geography
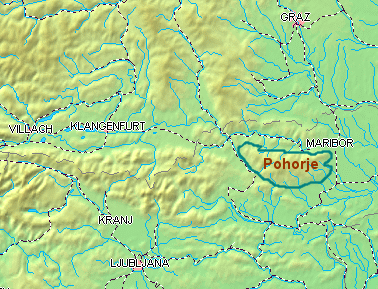
- Location of Pohorje
- Country: Slovenia
- Range coordinates: 46°32′N 15°28′E
- Parent range: Southern Limestone Alps

Pohorje (pronounced [ˈpóːxɔɾjɛ]), also known as the Pohorje Massif or the Pohorje Mountains (German: Bachergebirge, Bacherngebirge or often simply Bachern), is a mostly wooded, medium-high mountain range south of the Drava River in northeastern Slovenia. According to the traditional AVE classification it belongs to the Southern Limestone Alps. Geologically, it forms part of the Central Alps and features silicate metamorphic and igneous rock. Pohorje is sparsely populated with dispersed villages. There are also some ski resorts.

== Geography ==
Pohorje is an Alpine mountain ridge with domed summits south of the Drava. It roughly lies in the triangle formed by the towns of Maribor (to the east), Dravograd (to the west) and Slovenske Konjice (to the south). To the northwest, it is bounded by the Mislinja River, to the south by the Vitanje Lowlands (Vitanjsko podolje), to the east it descends to the Drava Plain (Dravsko polje) and to the southeast it descends to the Pohorje Foothills (Podpohorske gorice). It measures about 50 km (31 mi) from east to west and 30 km (19 mi) from north to south and covers an area of ca. 840 km^{2} (320 sq mi). Its highest elevations are Black Peak (Slovene: Črni Vrh, German: Schwarzkogel) 1,543 m (5,062 ft), the only slightly lower Big Kopa Peak (Velika Kopa), and Lake Peak (Jezerski vrh), which rises to 1,537 m (5,043 ft). Forests cover over 70% of its surface.

== Geology ==
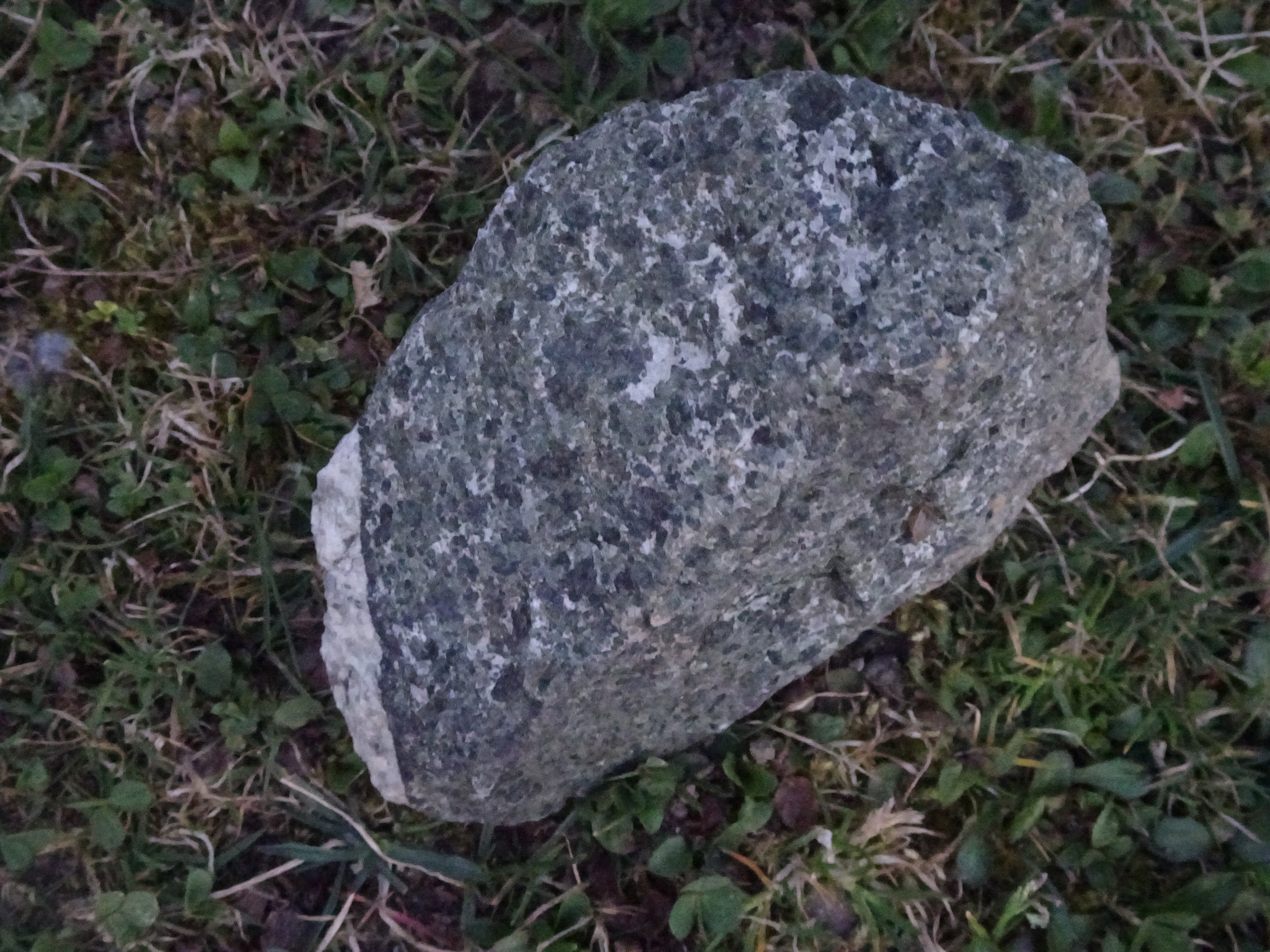
Cizlakite sample

Pohorje is a young mountain massif and is the southeasternmost part of the Central Alps. It is the only mountain chain in Slovenia made of silicate rock. Its peripheral parts consist of Paleozoic metamorphic rock, and its central parts of igneous rock, particularly granodiorite (known also as the Pohorje tonalite) and dacite.

Near the village of Cezlak lies probably the only known deposit of cizlakite (quartz monzogabbro; a green plutonic rock). The southern parts of Pohorje are known for white marble, which was quarried in Roman times.

== Pohorje ski resorts ==
The following ski resorts stand at Pohorje:

- Rogla Ski Resort
- Kope–Ribnica Pohorje Ski Resort
- Maribor Pohorje Ski Resort
- Trije Kralji Ski Resort

== Radio towers ==
Near hilltops within the mountain range are located a TV and radio transmitter Pohorje and a military air-traffic control radar station RP-2.

== Bibliography ==
=== Meteorology ===
- Počakal, Damir (2005-12-15). "Influence of Orography on Hail Characteristics in the Continental Part of Croatia". Hrvatski meteorološki časopis (40): 641–642. ISSN 1330-0083.
