= Mlino =

Former settlement in Bled, Slovenia

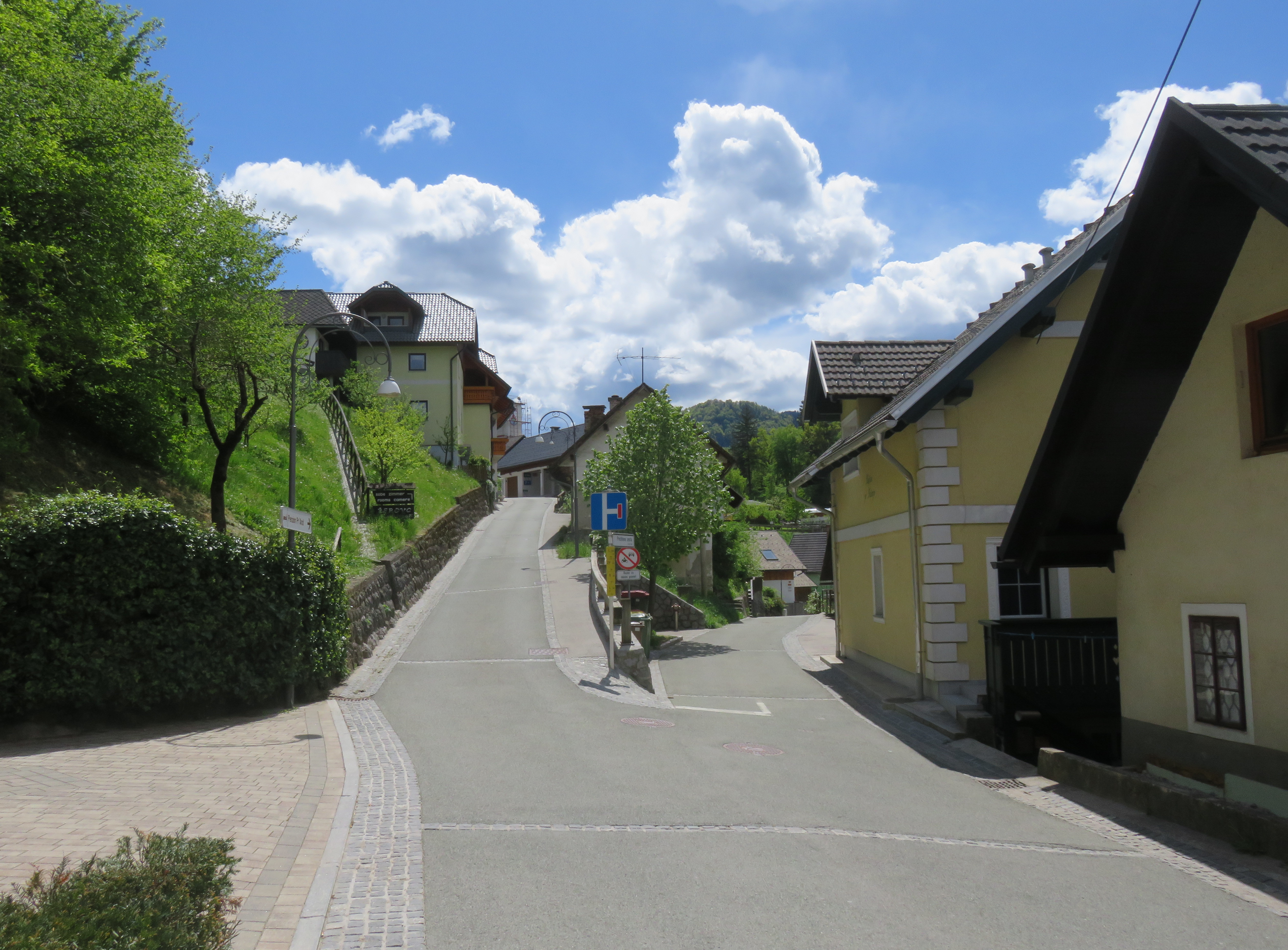

- Location in Slovenia
- Coordinates: 46°21′30″N 14°06′01″E
- Country: Slovenia
- Traditional Region: Upper Carniola
- Statistical region: Upper Carniola
- Municipality: Bled
- Elevation: 480 m (1,570 ft)

Mlino (pronounced [ˈmliːnɔ], formerly Bled–Mlino; German: Seebach) is a former settlement in the Municipality of Bled in northwestern Slovenia. It is now part of the town of Bled. The area is part of the traditional region of Upper Carniola and is now included with the rest of the municipality in the Upper Carniola Statistical Region.

== Geography ==
Mlino lies in the southern part of Bled, above the southern shore of Lake Bled. It is located southwest of the former village of Želeče. Kozarca Hill (elevation: 558 meters (1,831 ft)) rises to the south, and Jezernica Creek flows through the settlement. Before the village became part of the town of Bled, Bled Island and its church belonged to Mlino. The name Mlino is derived from the common noun mlin, referring to economic activity in the settlement.

== Name ==
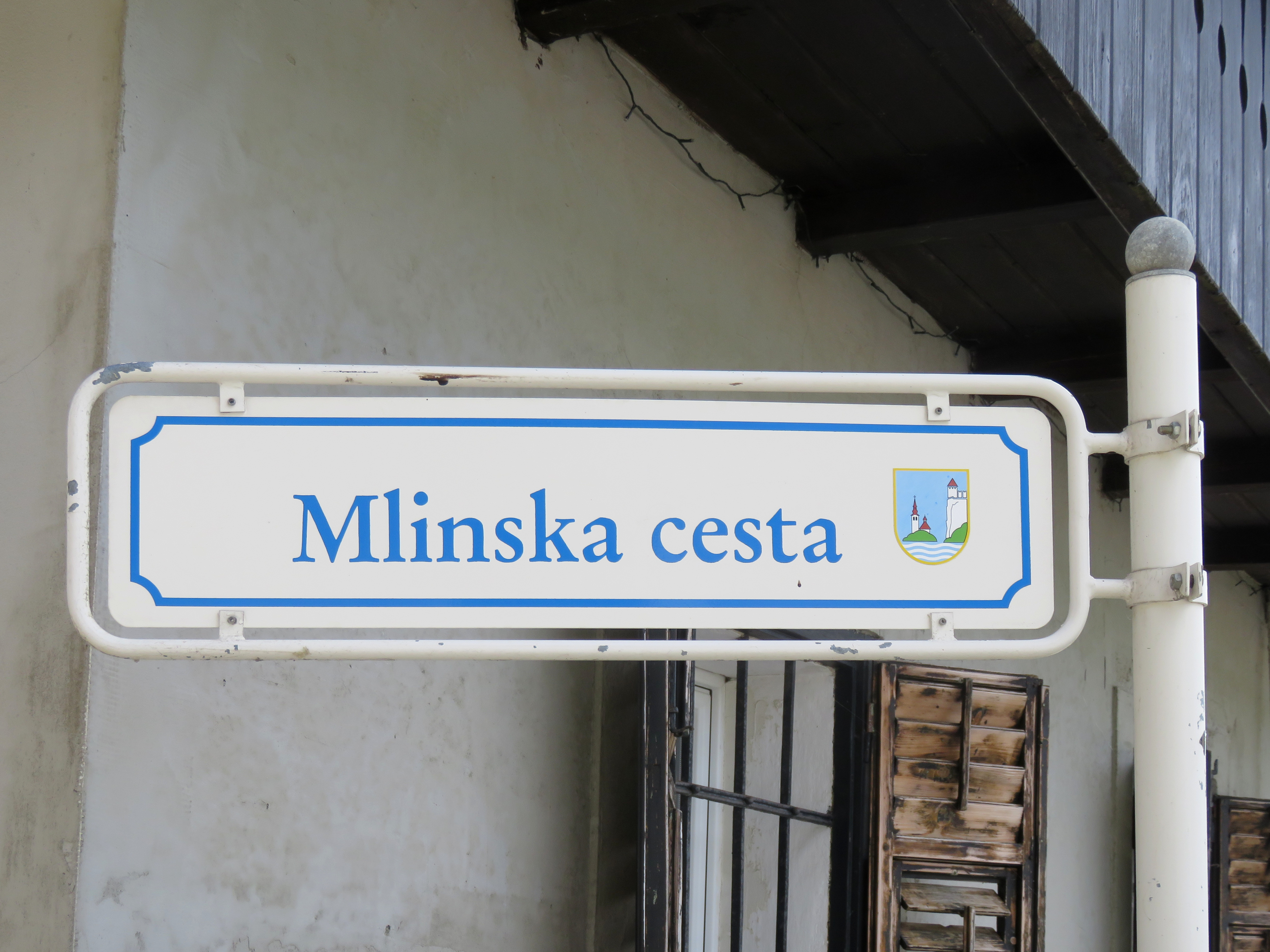
A sign for Mlinska cesta (Mlino Street)

Mlino was attested in written sources as Sepach in 1185 and Sapakch in 1436 (among other spellings), and as Vieserniczy in 1602. After the Second World War, it was also known as Bled–Mlino.

== History ==
Mlino had a population of 334 living in 61 houses in 1869, 372 in 64 houses in 1880, 348 in 63 houses in 1890, 334 in 74 houses in 1900, and 409 in 108 houses in 1931. Mlino was merged with other villages to create the town of Bled in 1960, ending its existence as a separate settlement.

== Notable people ==
Notable people that were born or lived in Mlino include the following:

- Jakob Soklič (1893–1972), writer and art historian
