= Rečica, Bled =

Former settlement in Bled, Slovenia

Rečica
- Location in Slovenia
- Coordinates: 46°22′37″N 14°05′23″E
- Country: Slovenia
- Traditional Region: Upper Carniola
- Statistical region: Upper Carniola
- Municipality: Bled
- Elevation: 523 m (1,716 ft)

Rečica (pronounced [ɾɛˈtʃiːtsa], formerly Bled–Rečica; German: Retschiz or Reschitz or Retschitz) is a former settlement in the Municipality of Bled in northwestern Slovenia. It is now part of the town of Bled. The area is part of the traditional region of Upper Carniola and is now included with the rest of the municipality in the Upper Carniola Statistical Region.

== Geography ==
Rečica lies in the northwestern part of Bled, above the northwestern shore of Lake Bled. Rečica Creek, a tributary of the Sava Dolinka River, flows through the settlement. The terrain consists of rolling hills and somewhat swampy ground with meadows and pastures. The settlement includes the hamlet of Grimšče (or Grimščice) to the north, with Grimščice Manor (Slovene: Dvorec Grimščice, German: Grimschitzhof), also known as Wilsonia Castle (Slovene: Grad Wilsonia).

== Name ==
Rečica was attested in written sources as Rieschisch in 1253, Rehschitz in 1273, and Reschize in 1287 (among other spellings). The name is a diminutive of the Slovene common noun reka 'river', referring to the creek that flows through the settlement.

== History ==
Rečica had a population of 219 living in 44 houses in 1869, 234 in 48 houses in 1880, 225 in 51 houses in 1890, 264 in 58 houses in 1900, and 549 in 116 houses in 1931. Rečica was merged with other villages to create the town of Bled in 1960, ending its existence as a separate settlement.

== Church ==
The church in Rečica is dedicated to Saint Andrew. The church dates back to the late Middle Ages, and it has a rectangular nave and an octagonal chancel with three facing walls. The church has a vaulted ceiling, and the exterior is decorated in the Historicist style. The bell tower and the furnishings of the church are Baroque. A wall around the church was probably used as a defense against Ottoman attacks.

== Notable people ==
Notable people that were born or lived in Rečica include the following:

- Ivan Jan (1921–2007), writer
- Franc Seraf Plemel (1828–1852), botanist
- Valentin Plemel (1820–1875), botanist
