= St. Martin's Parish Church (Bled) =

Church in Bled, Slovenia

Coordinates: 46°22′13.85″N 14°6′15.73″E

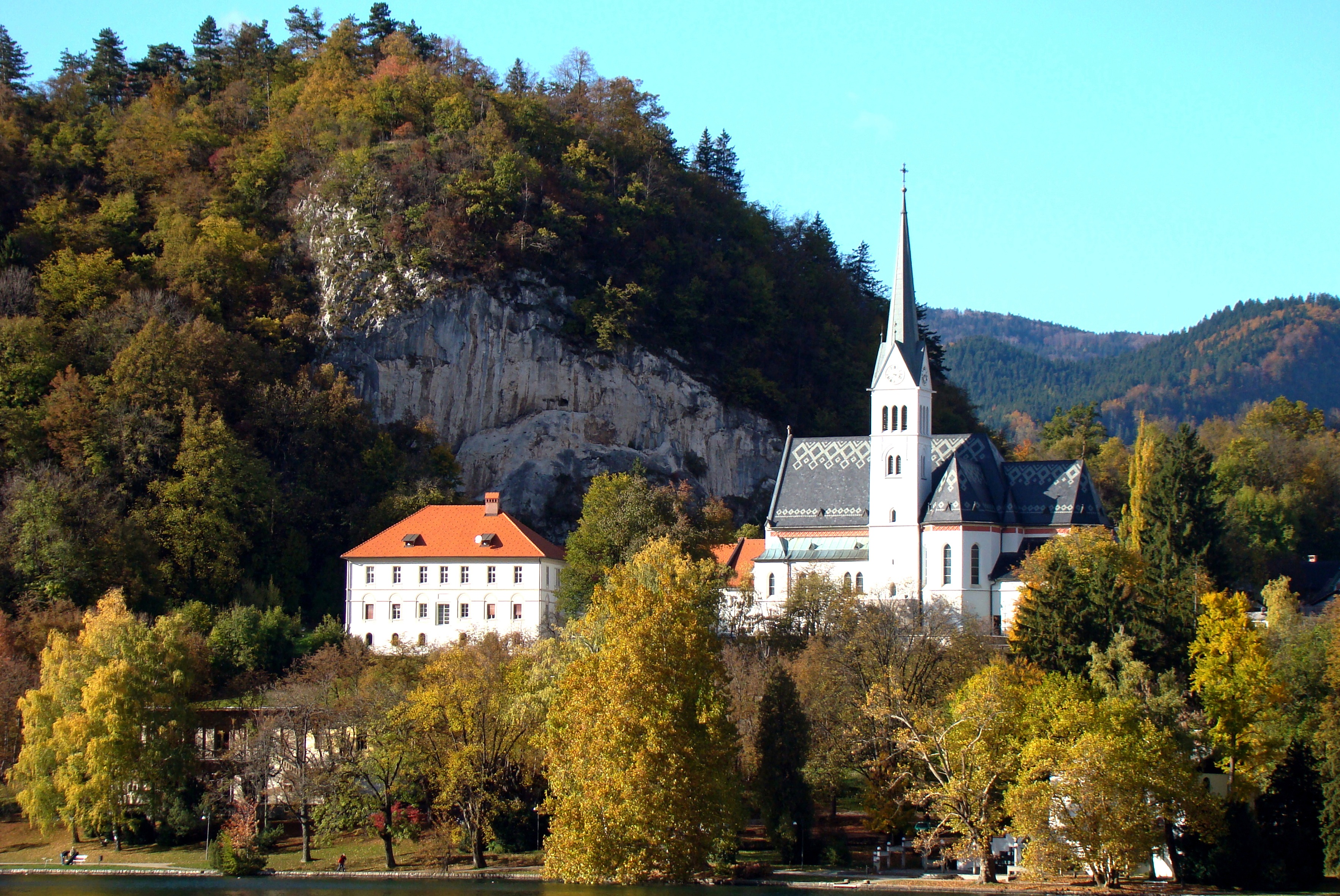
St. Martin's Parish Church in Bled

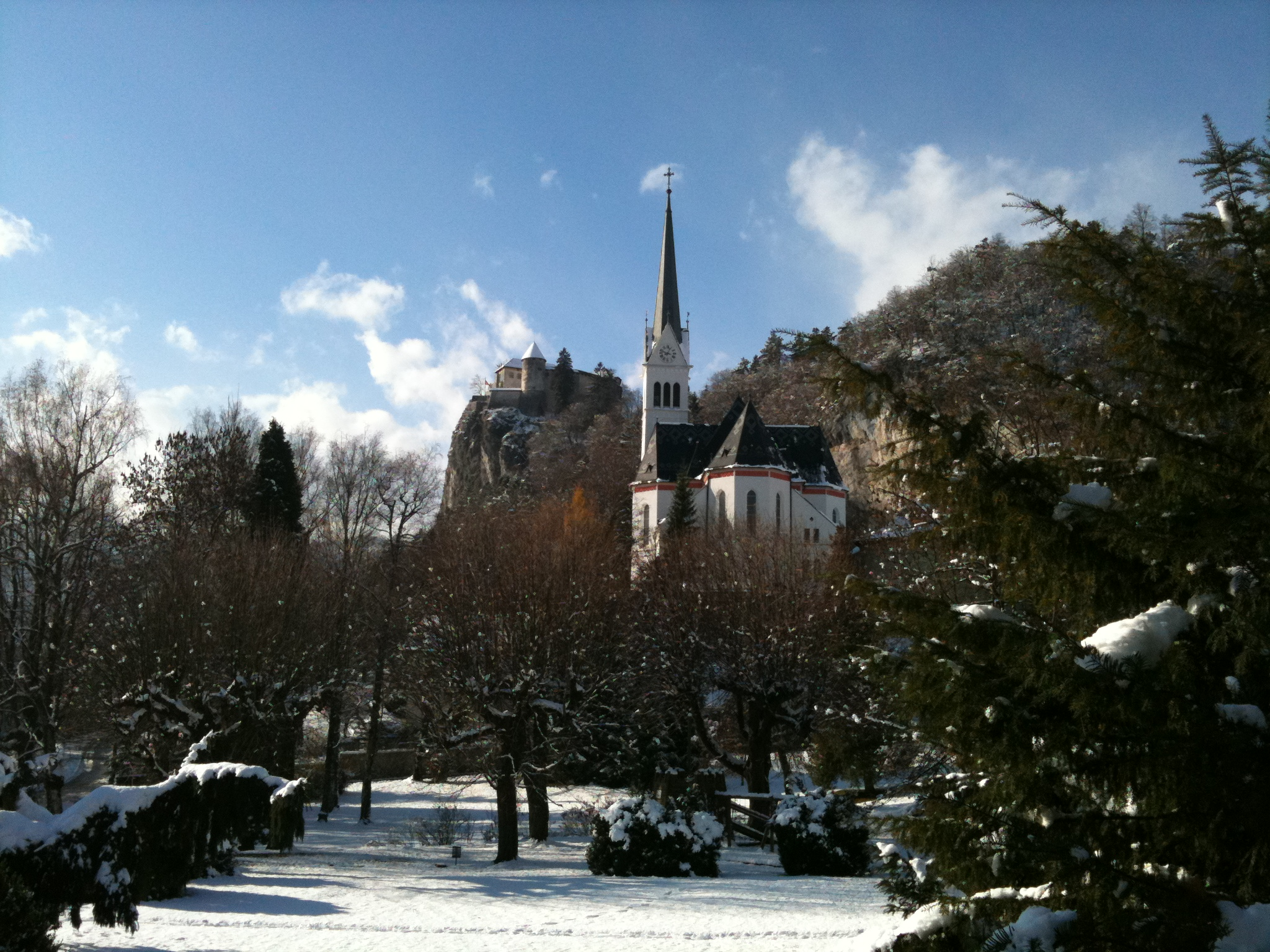
St. Martin's Parish Church in the winter, beneath Bled Castle

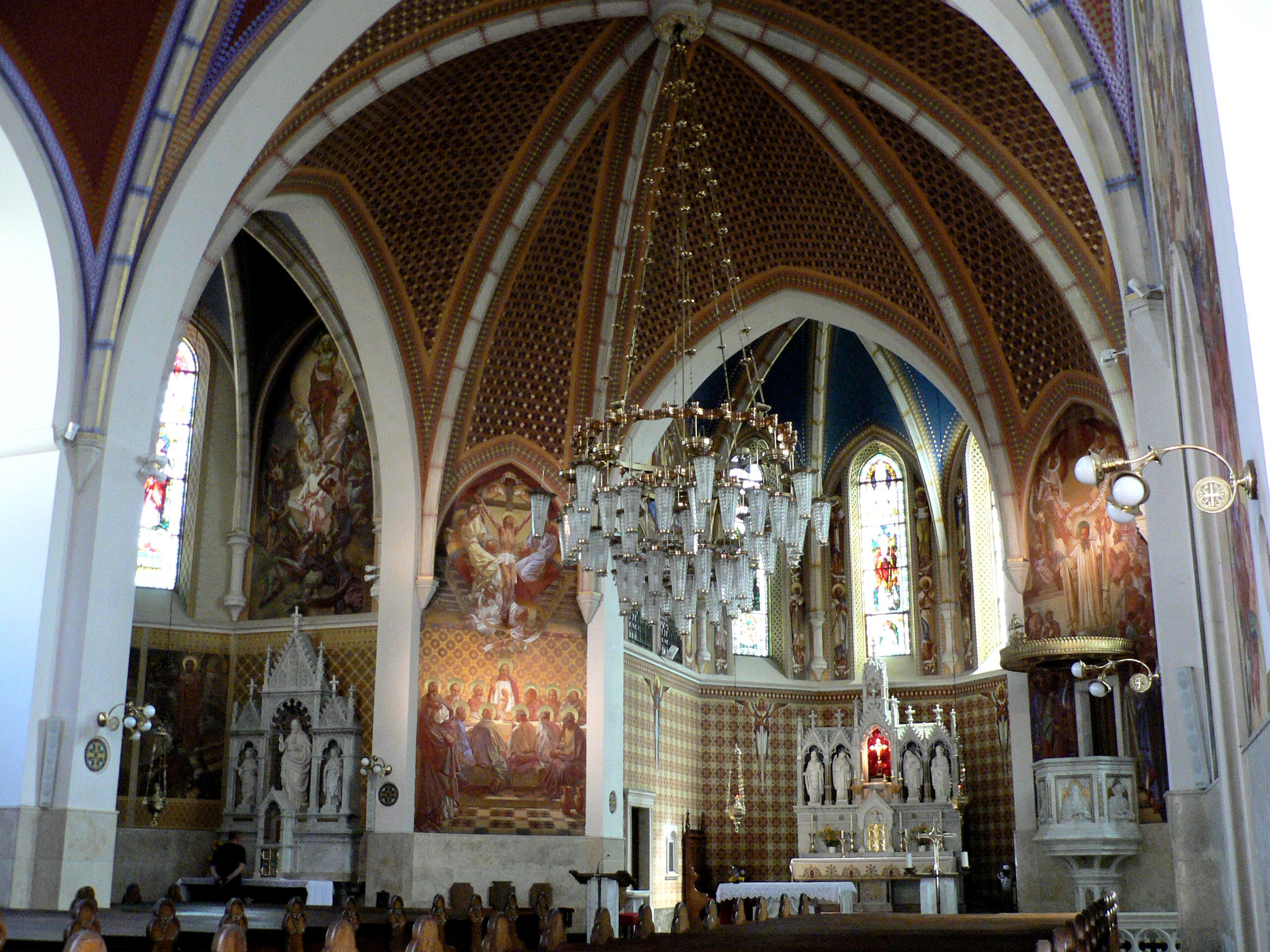
Interior of St. Martin's Parish Church in Bled

St. Martin's Parish Church (Slovene: župnijska cerkev svetega Martina) in Bled (northwestern Slovenia) is the parish church of the Parish of Bled.

== Construction ==
A Gothic Revival structure was built from 1903 until 1905 according to plans by the Austrian architect Friedrich von Schmidt, with minor modifications, particularly in regard to internal equipment, by the architect Josip Vancaš. It was built by the Gustav Tönnies Company from Ljubljana.

== Equipment ==
The church contains a number of frescoes painted in 1930 by the Prešeren Award-winning artist Slavko Pengov, including one portraying Vladimir Lenin as Judas Iscariot in a depiction of the Last Supper. It also hosts a number of statues by Ivan Vurnik.
