= Grand Hotel Toplice =

Hotel in Bled, Slovenia

Coordinates: 46°21′56.79″N 14°6′26.52″E

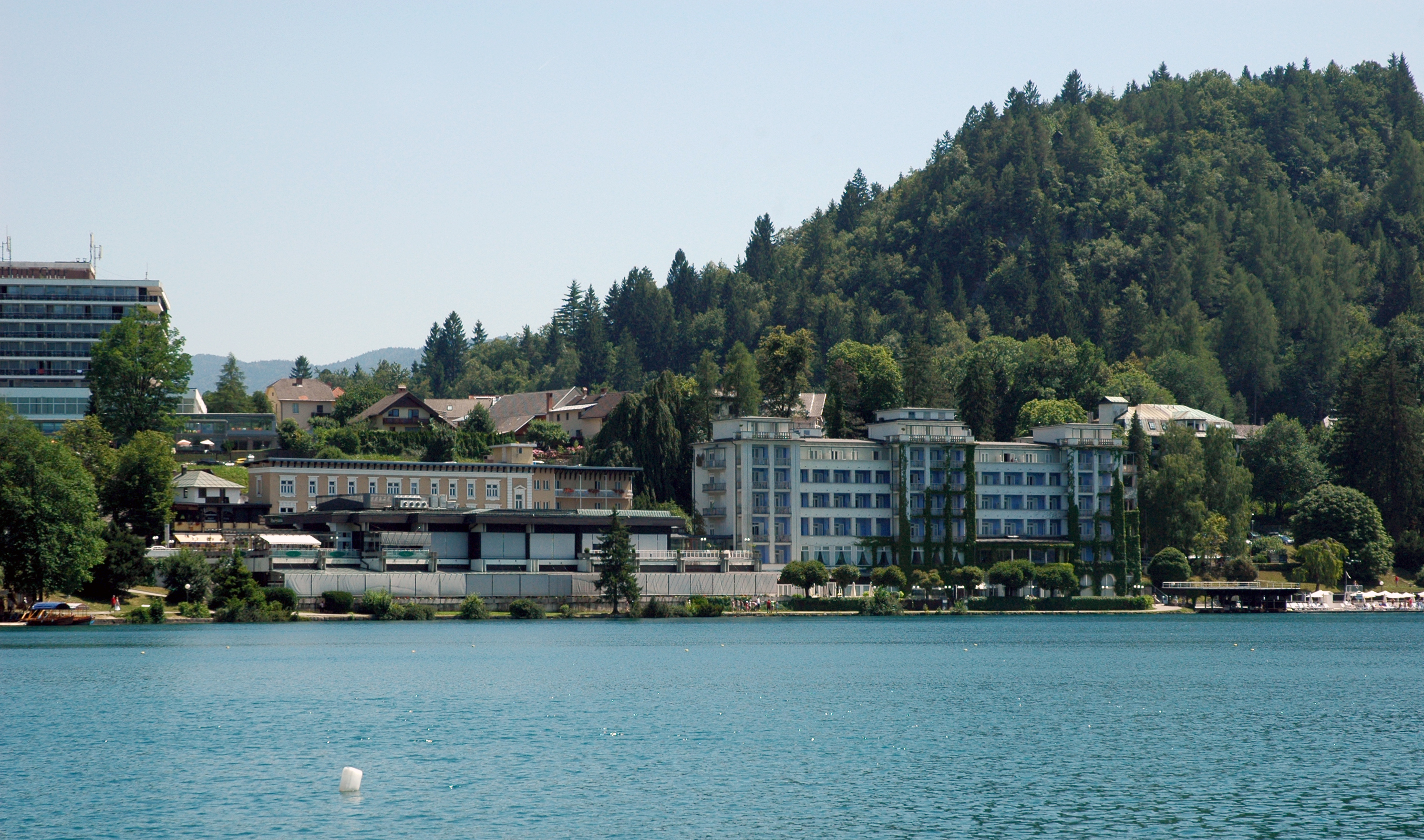
- Interactive map of the Grand Hotel Toplice area

General information
- Location: Bled, Slovenia
- Opening: 1850, 1931

Design and construction
- Architect: Franz Baumgartner

Other information
- Number of rooms: 54
- Number of suites: 33

Website
- www.hotel-toplice.com

Grand Hotel Toplice is a five-star deluxe hotel in Bled, Slovenia.

== History ==
In 1850, Hotel Luisenbad was built on the site of today's Toplice by Josef Luckmann. Hotel shortly became a meeting point for Austrian elite as well as a vacation destination for wealthy foreigners. In 1894, it featured thermal baths, a casino and an oriental coffee house.

After the dissolution of Austria-Hungary in 1918, the hotel was renamed to Grand Hotel Toplice by the new owner. In 1931, the hotel opened again after it was renovated by Austrian architect Franz Baumgartner. Since then, prominent visitors often resided here as Bled became a diplomatic haven after King Alexander I of Yugoslavia and later Josip Broz Tito chose this alpine resort as their summer residence.

Today, Grand Hotel Toplice still has its charm and is frequented by guests from all over the world.

The hotel is incorporated into Small Luxury Hotels of The World and Sava Hotels & Resorts consortium.

== Famous guests ==
Famous residents:

- Aleksander I Obrenović, King of Serbia
- Arthur Miller, American writer
- Ignazio Silone, Italian author
- Pablo Neruda, Chilean poet
- Agatha Christie, British Author
- Chris Barnard, South African cardiac surgeon
- Franz Josef Strauss, Bavarian minister-president
- Hussein I, King of Jordan
- Willy Brandt, West German Chancellor
- Baron Carrington British Foreign Secretary
- Madeleine Albright US Secretary of State
