= Želeče =

Former settlement in Bled, Slovenia

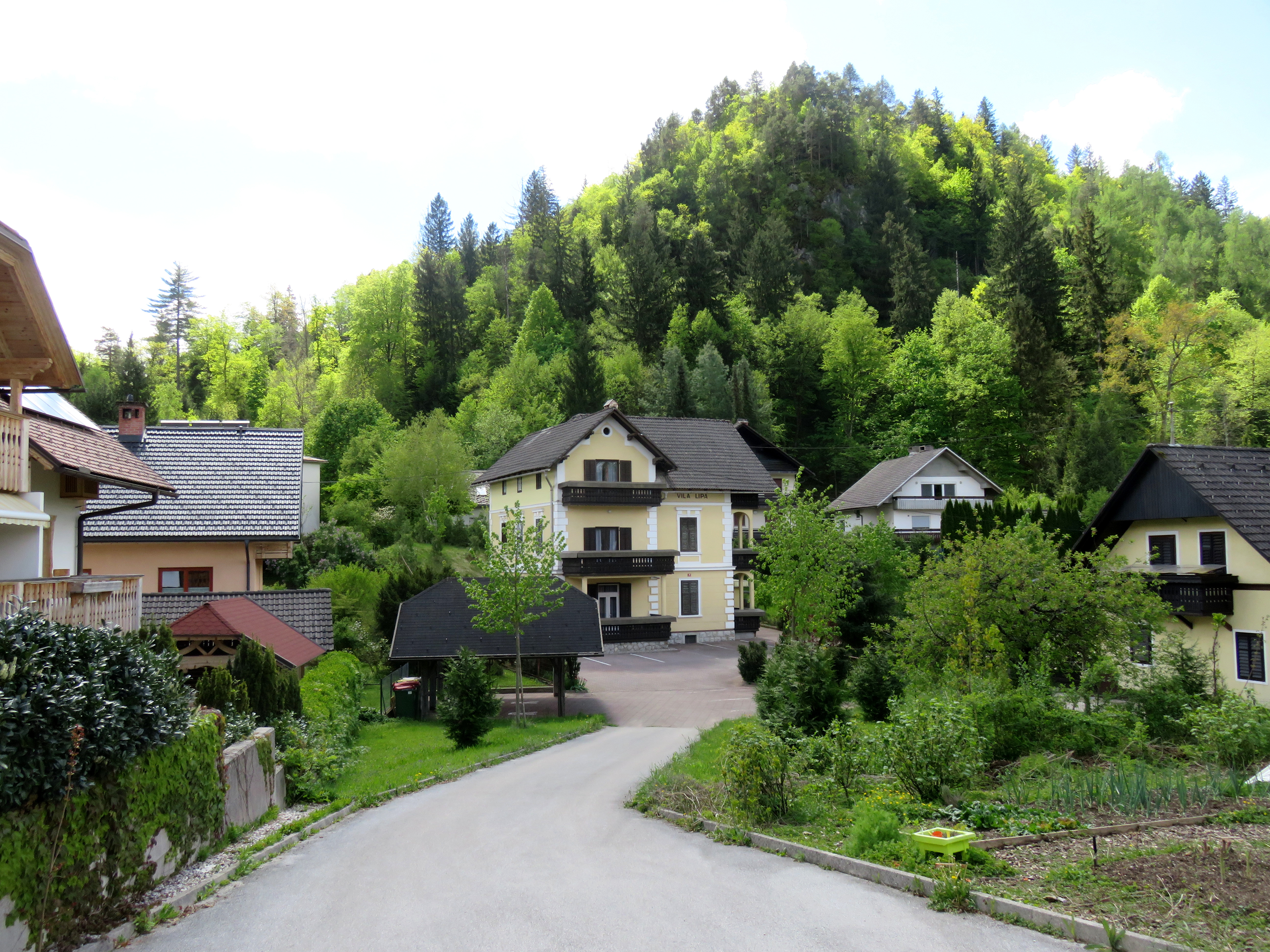

- Location in Slovenia
- Coordinates: 46°21′54″N 14°06′31″E
- Country: Slovenia
- Traditional Region: Upper Carniola
- Statistical region: Upper Carniola
- Municipality: Bled
- Elevation: 500 m (1,600 ft)

Želeče (pronounced [ʒɛˈleːtʃɛ], formerly Bled–Želeče; German: Schalkendorf) is a former settlement in the Municipality of Bled in northwestern Slovenia. It is now part of the town of Bled. The area is part of the traditional region of Upper Carniola and is now included with the rest of the municipality in the Upper Carniola Statistical Region.

== Geography ==
Želeče lies in the southern part of Bled, above the southeastern shore of Lake Bled. It is located southwest of the former village of Zagorice. There is a cable lift from the southern part of Želeče to Straža Hill (elevation: 646 meters (2,119 ft)).

== Name ==
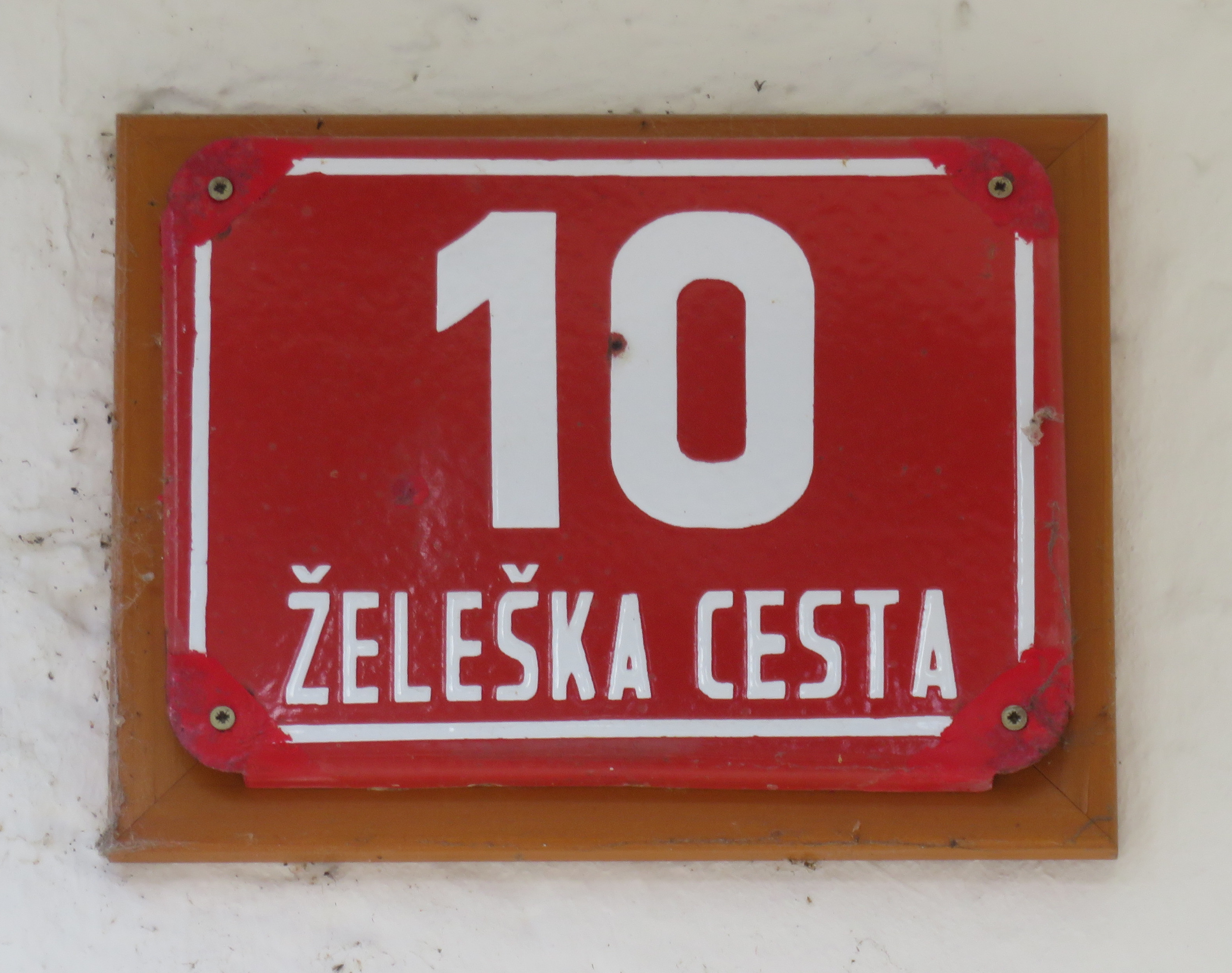
A sign for Želeška cesta (Želeče Street)

Želeče was attested in written sources as Zilecca between 1070 and 1090, Schalchendorf in 1253, Zelleczach in 1366, and Ze Lëtschach in 1380, among other spellings. After the Second World War, it was also known as Bled–Želeče.

== History ==
Želeče had a population of 84 living in 21 houses in 1869, 99 in 30 houses in 1880, 116 in 31 houses in 1890, 149 in 50 houses in 1900, and 253 in 70 houses in 1931. Želeče was merged with other villages to create the town of Bled in 1960, ending its existence as a separate settlement. By the late 1960s, extensive vacation housing had been built in the Dindol Valley southeast of Želeče.

== Notable people ==
Notable people that were born or lived in Želeče include the following:

- Thomas Christan (1735–1800), physician
