= Bled Jezero railway station =

Railway station in Slovenia

Bled Jezero
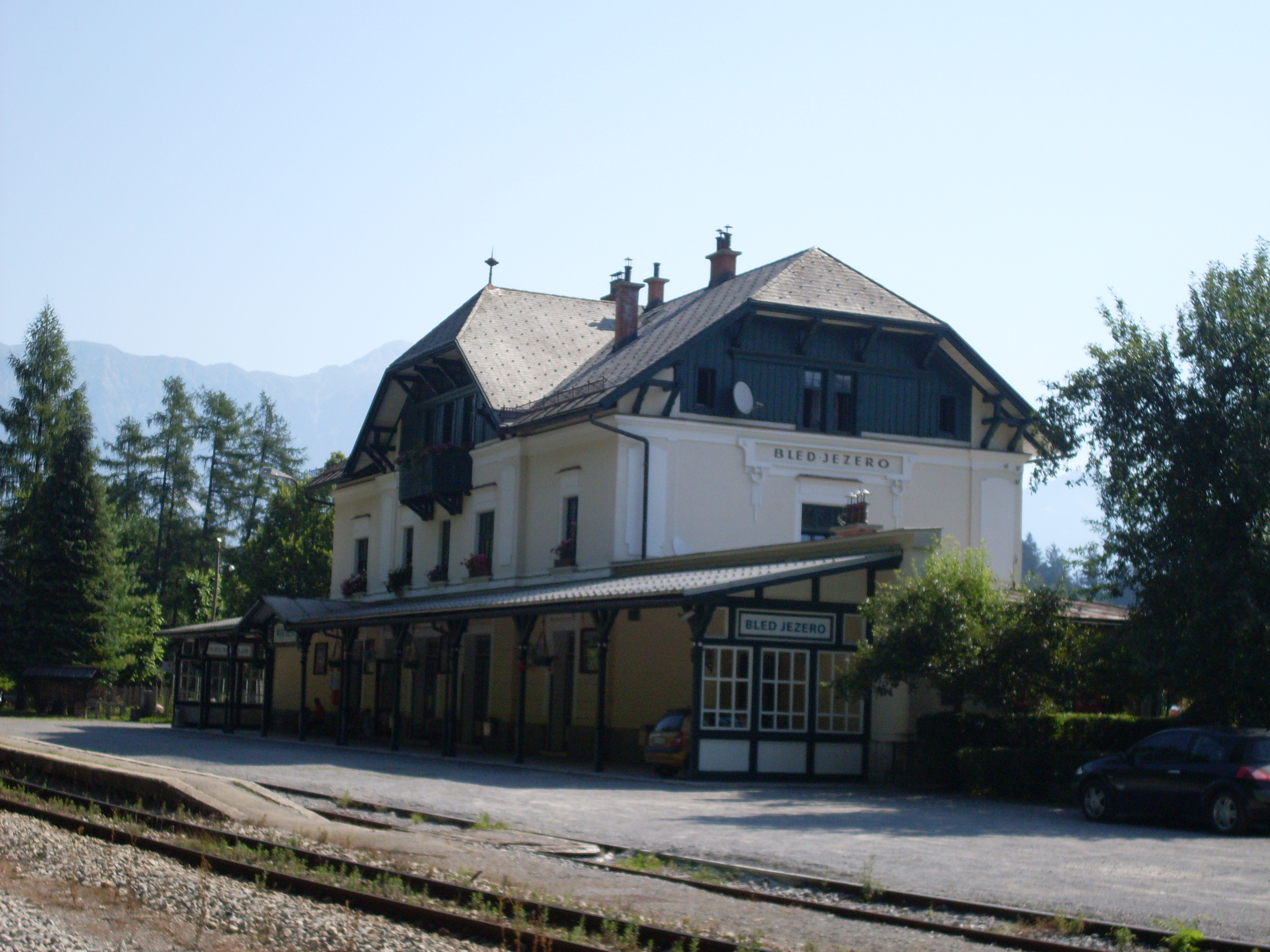
- Bled Jezero station building

General information
- Location: Kolodvorska cesta, 4260 Bled; Slovenia
- Coordinates: 46°22′06″N 14°04′57″E
- Owner: Slovenian Railways
- Operator: Slovenian Railways
- Line: Jesenice - Sežana railway
- Platforms: 2
Location
- Location within Slovenia

Bled Jezero railway station (Slovene: Železniška postaja Bled Jezero) is the principal railway station in Bled, Slovenia. The station is located above the west coast of Lake Bled. It is connected to the lake and the settlement Zaka by a footpath. It is located on the Jesenice - Sežana railway and train services from Jesenice to Nova Gorica call here approximately once every two hours in each direction, however the timetable is irregular. Some of the services are extended from/to Ljubljana and Sežana.
