= Bled =

- Town
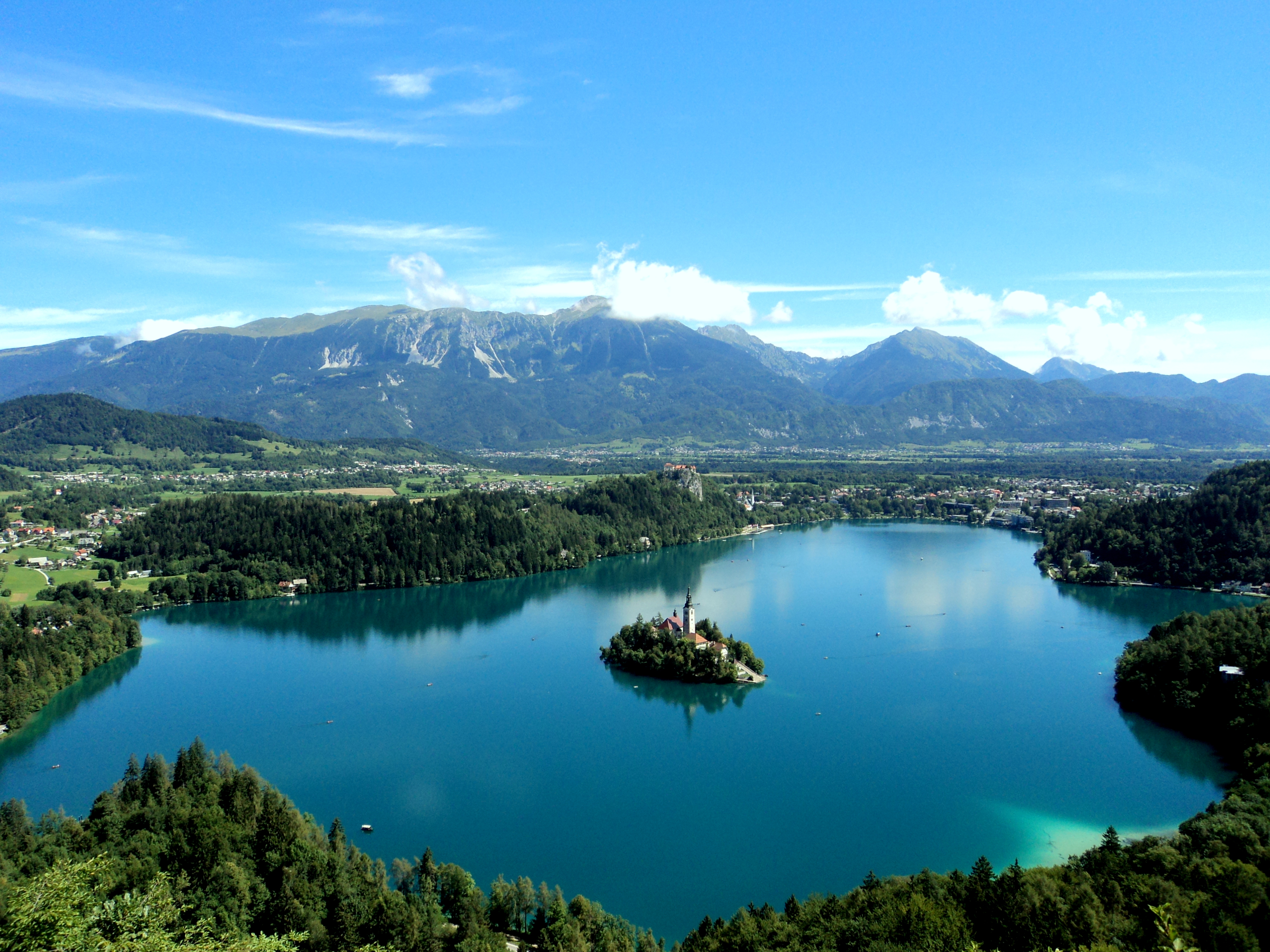
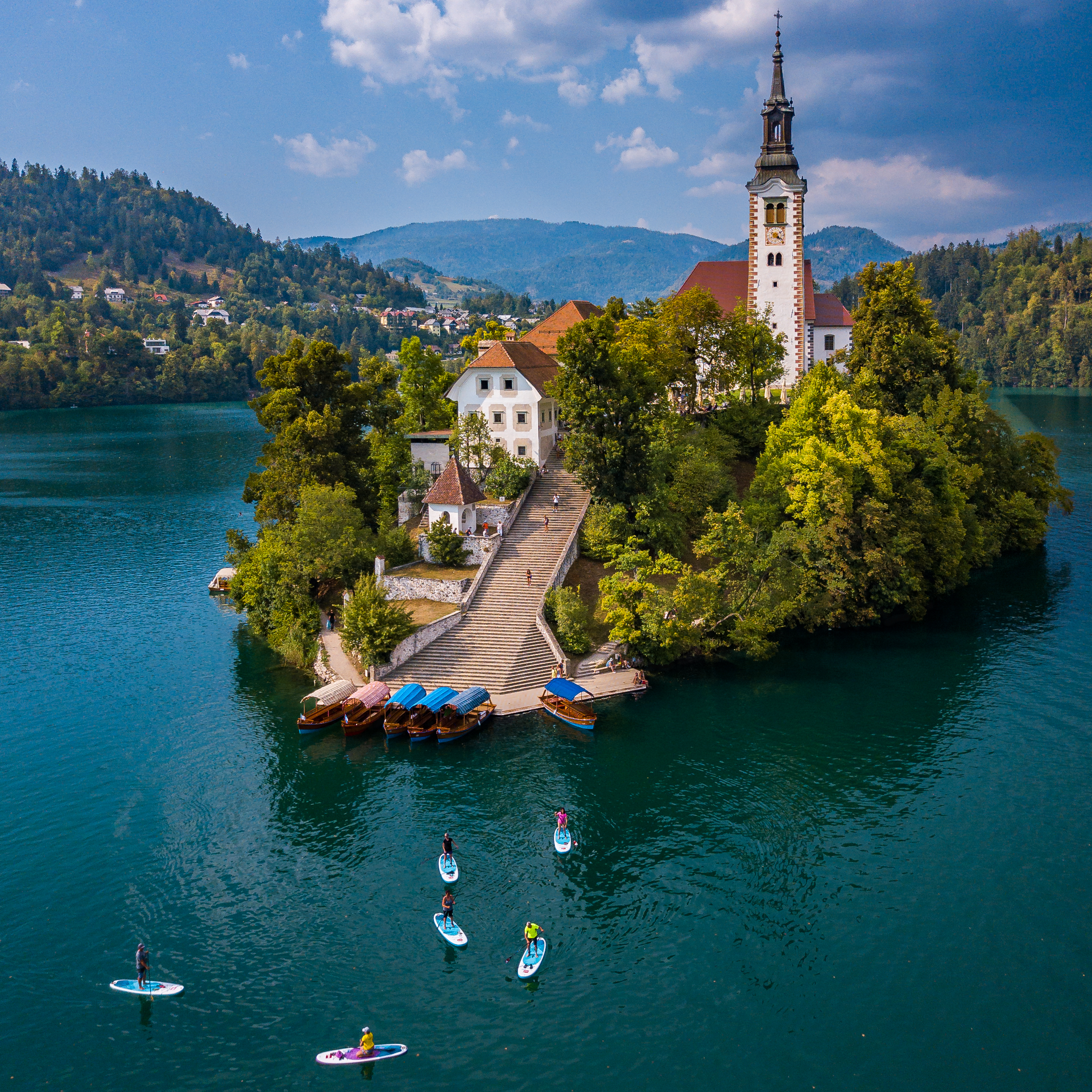
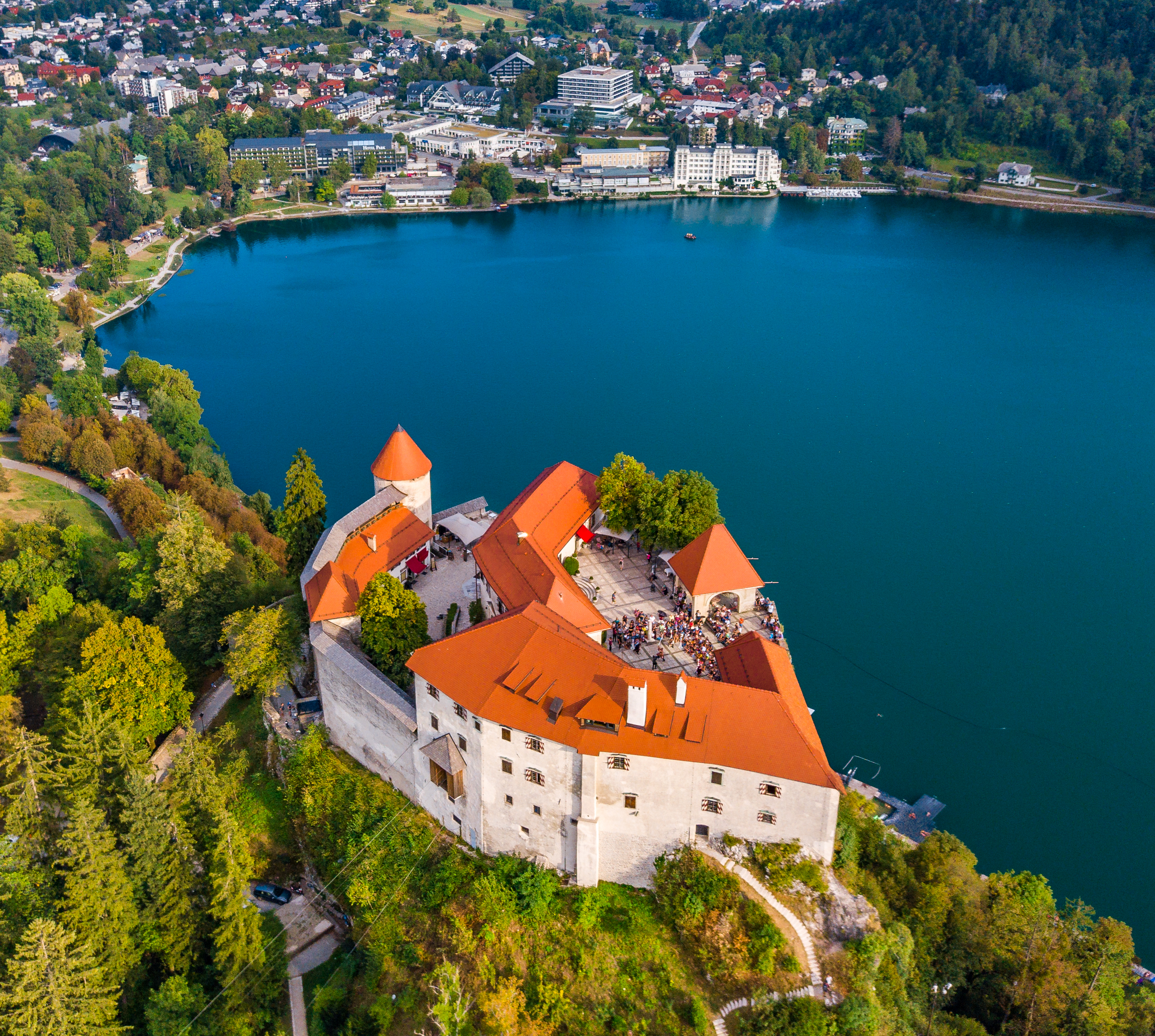
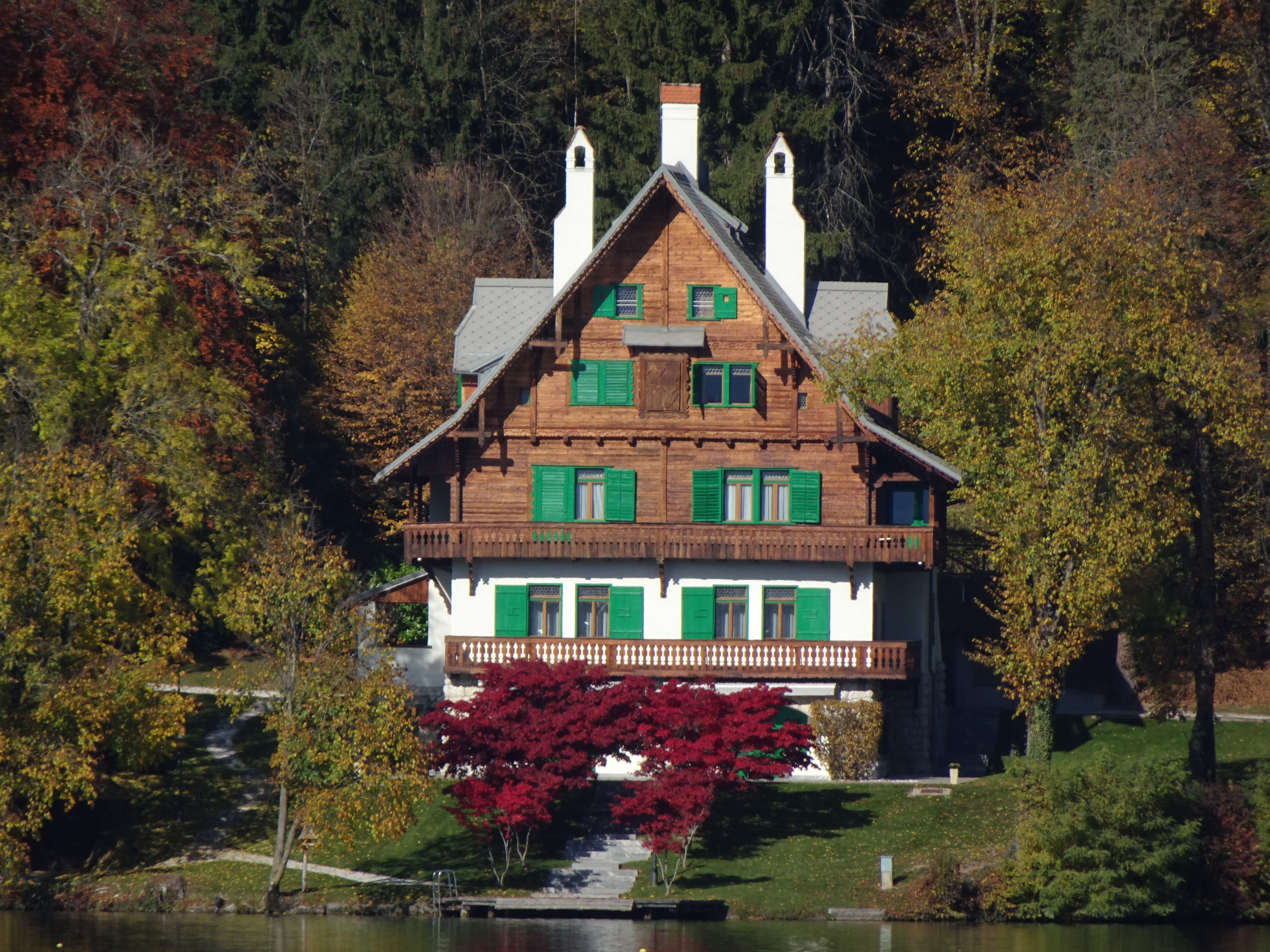
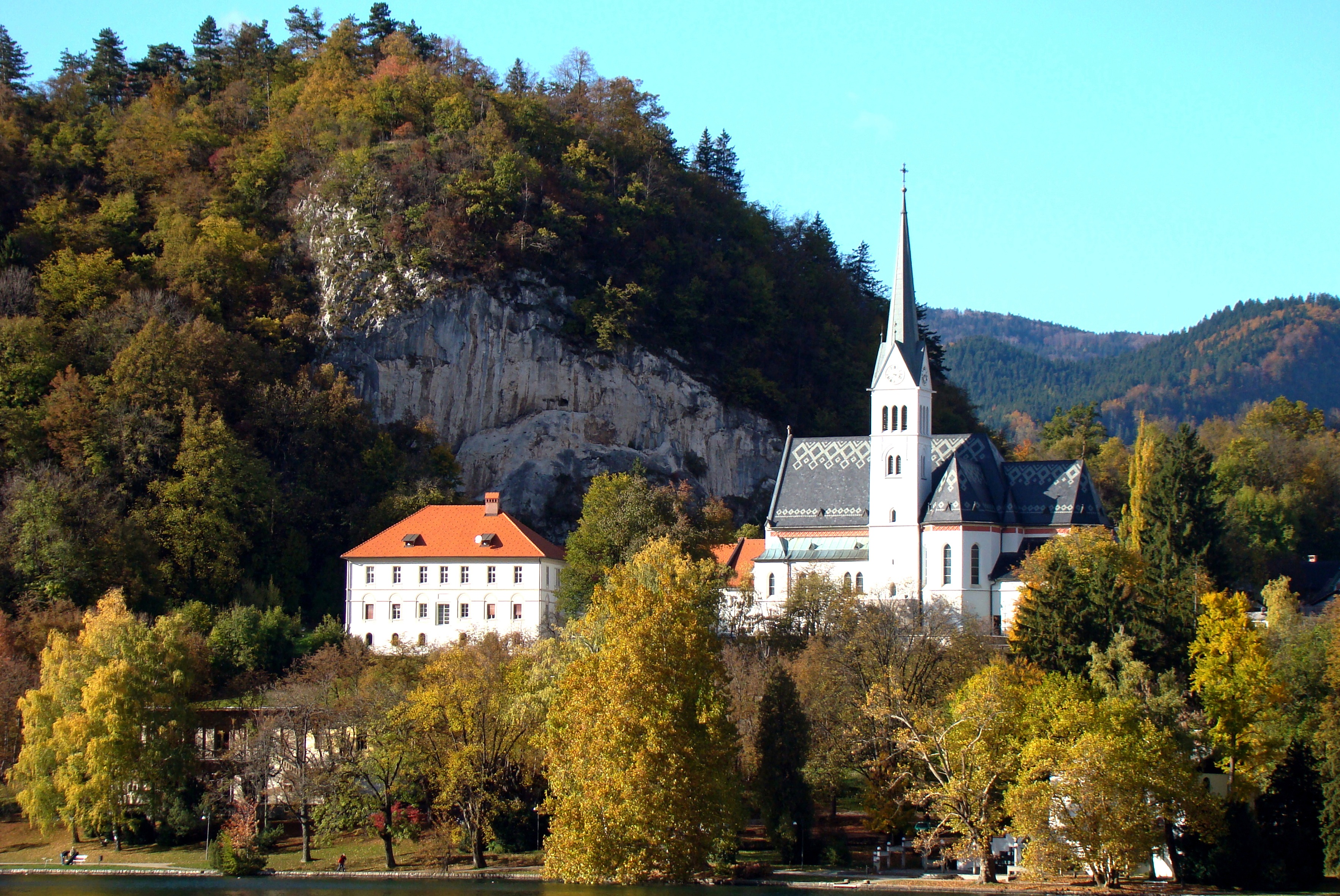
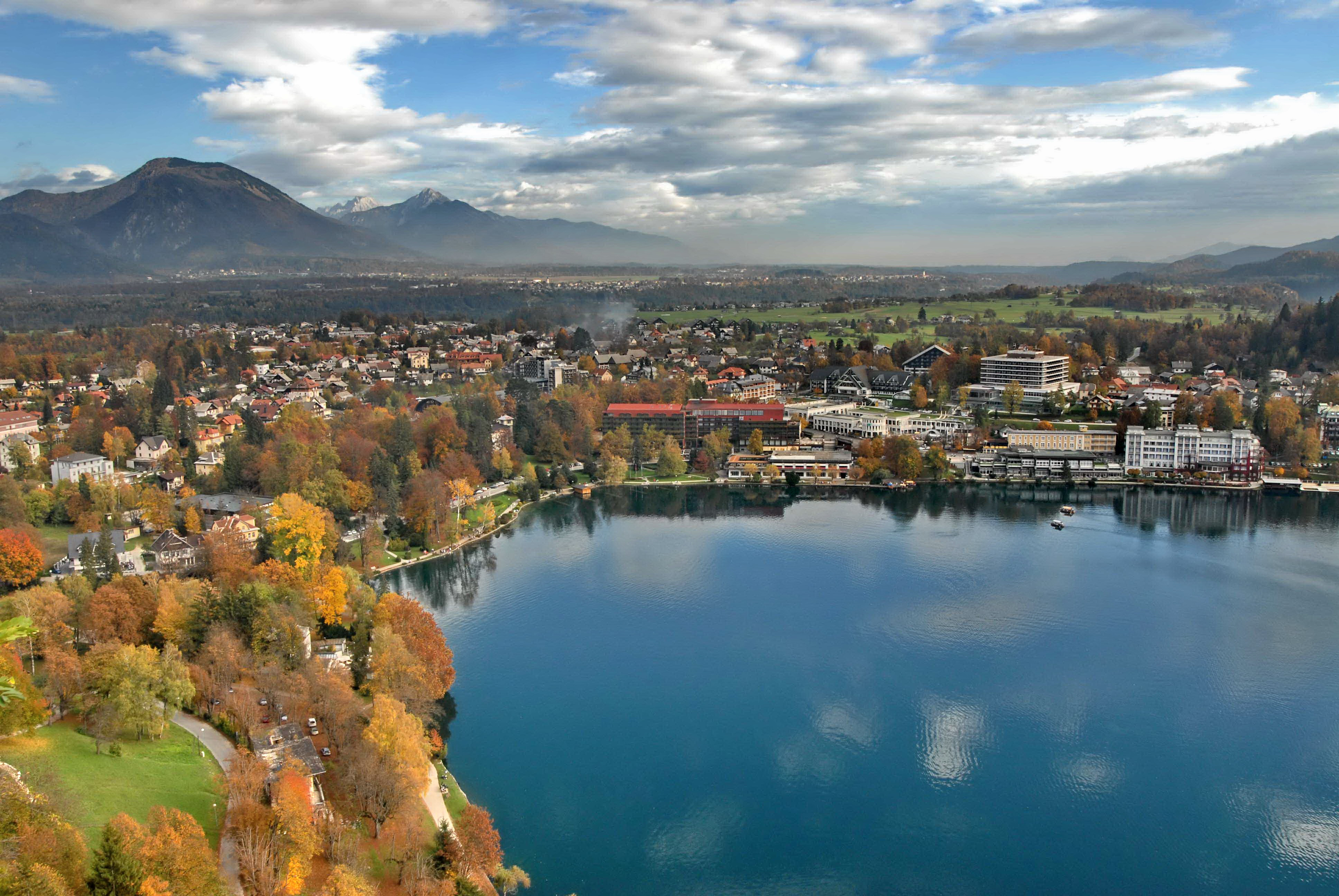
- From top, left to right: Bled from above, Bled Island, Bled Castle, Zlatorog Villa, St. Martin's Church, Town from Bled Castle

- Flag Seal

- Location in Slovenia
- Coordinates: 46°22′06″N 14°06′53″E
- Country: Slovenia
- Traditional Region: Upper Carniola
- Statistical region: Upper Carniola
- Municipality: Bled

Government
  - Mayor: Janez Fajfar (Independent)

Area
  - Total: 13.6 km^{2} (5.3 sq mi)
- Elevation: 507.7 m (1,666 ft)

Population (2014)
  - Total: 8,171
  - Density: 601/km^{2} (1,560/sq mi)
- Time zone: UTC+1 (CET)
  - Summer (DST): UTC+2 (CEST)

Bled (pronounced [ˈbléːt]; German: Veldes, in older sources also Feldes) is a town on Lake Bled in the Upper Carniolan region of northwestern Slovenia. It is one of Slovenia's most visited tourist destinations. The town is the administrative seat of the Municipality of Bled.

== Name ==
The town was first attested in written sources as Ueldes in 1004 (and as Veldes in 1011). The etymology of the name is unknown and it is believed to be of pre-Slavic origin. The German name of the town, Veldes, was either borrowed from Old Slovene *Beldъ before AD 800 or is derived from the same pre-Slavic source as the Slovene name.

== Geography ==
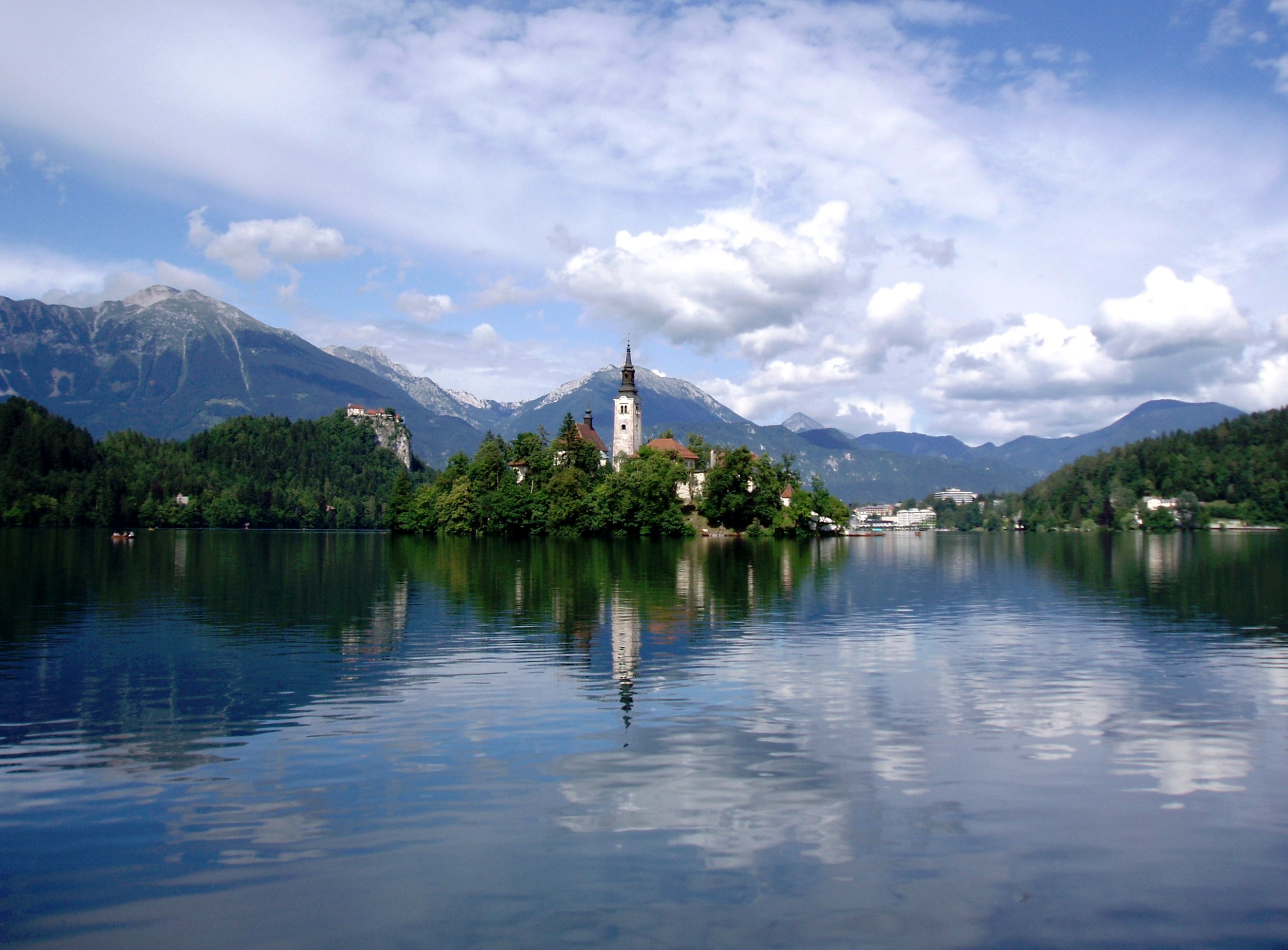
View over Lake Bled

Bled is located on the southern foot of the Karawanks mountain range near the border with Austria, about 50 km (31 mi) northwest of the national capital of Ljubljana. South of Lake Bled are the densely forested Pokljuka and Jelovica plateaus and the easternmost parts of the Julian Alps, where the Sava Bohinjka river and the parallel Bohinj Railway lead to the Bohinj basin, Lake Bohinj, and the Triglav massif.

A number of rises (Grad 599 m, Straža 646 m, Kozarca 558 m, Osojnica 756 m, and Ravnica 729 m) separate the localities of Bled around the lake, the former villages of Grad, Mlino, Rečica, Zagorice, and Želeče.

The lake is 2.12 kilometres (1.32 mi) long and 0.5 to 1 kilometre (0.31 to 0.62 mi) wide. In summer, the surface water reaches 25 °C (77 °F) and retains a temperature up to 18 °C (64 °F) until autumn. As such, it is suitable for swimming. During colder winters, the entire lake freezes and can be used for ice skating; the island can then be reached on foot.

There is a thermal spring (23 °C or 73 °F) near the lake, next to the Bled Fault. Its water is used in indoor pools in two hotels.

Historical population
| Year | Pop. | ±% |
|---|---|---|
| 1948 | 3,387 | — |
| 1953 | 3,844 | +13.5% |
| 1961 | 4,156 | +8.1% |
| 1971 | 4,756 | +14.4% |
| 1981 | 5,644 | +18.7% |
| 1991 | 5,767 | +2.2% |
| 2002 | 5,252 | −8.9% |
| 2011 | 5,181 | −1.4% |
| 2021 | 5,181 | +0.0% |
Population size may be affected by changes in administrative divisions

== History ==
=== Early medieval history ===
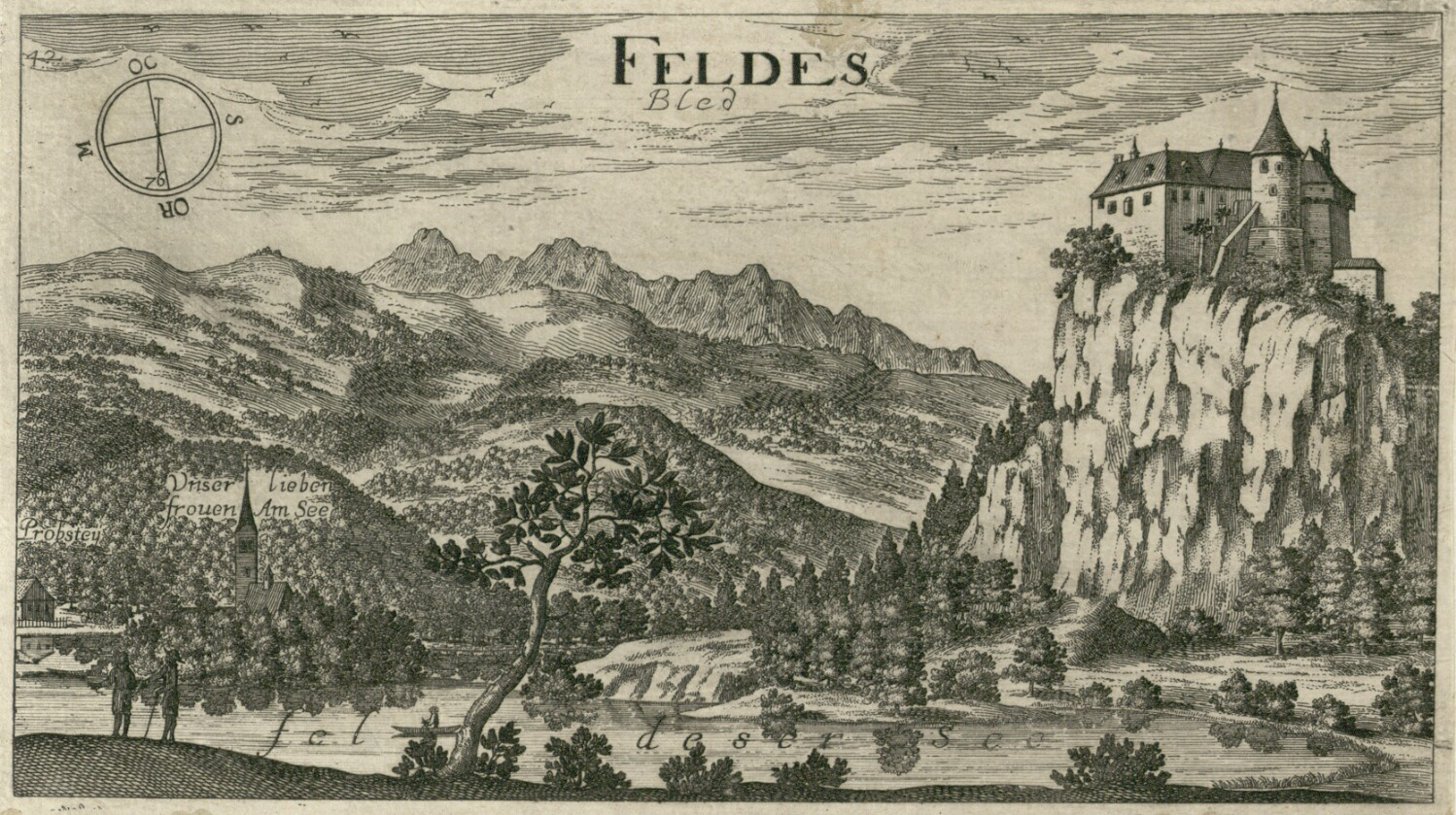
Lake Bled and Bled Castle by Valvasor, 17th century

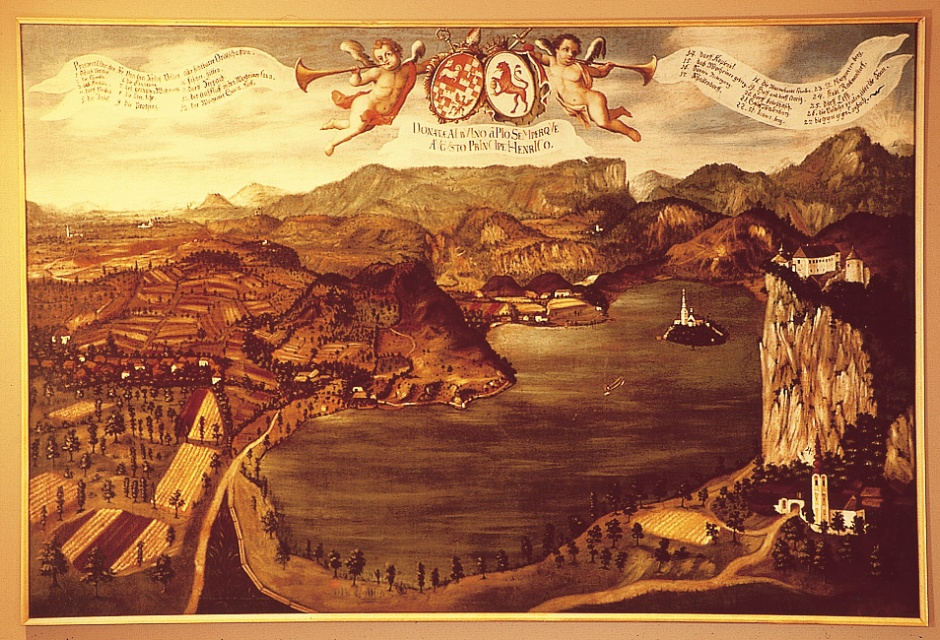
Panorama of Bled, 18th century

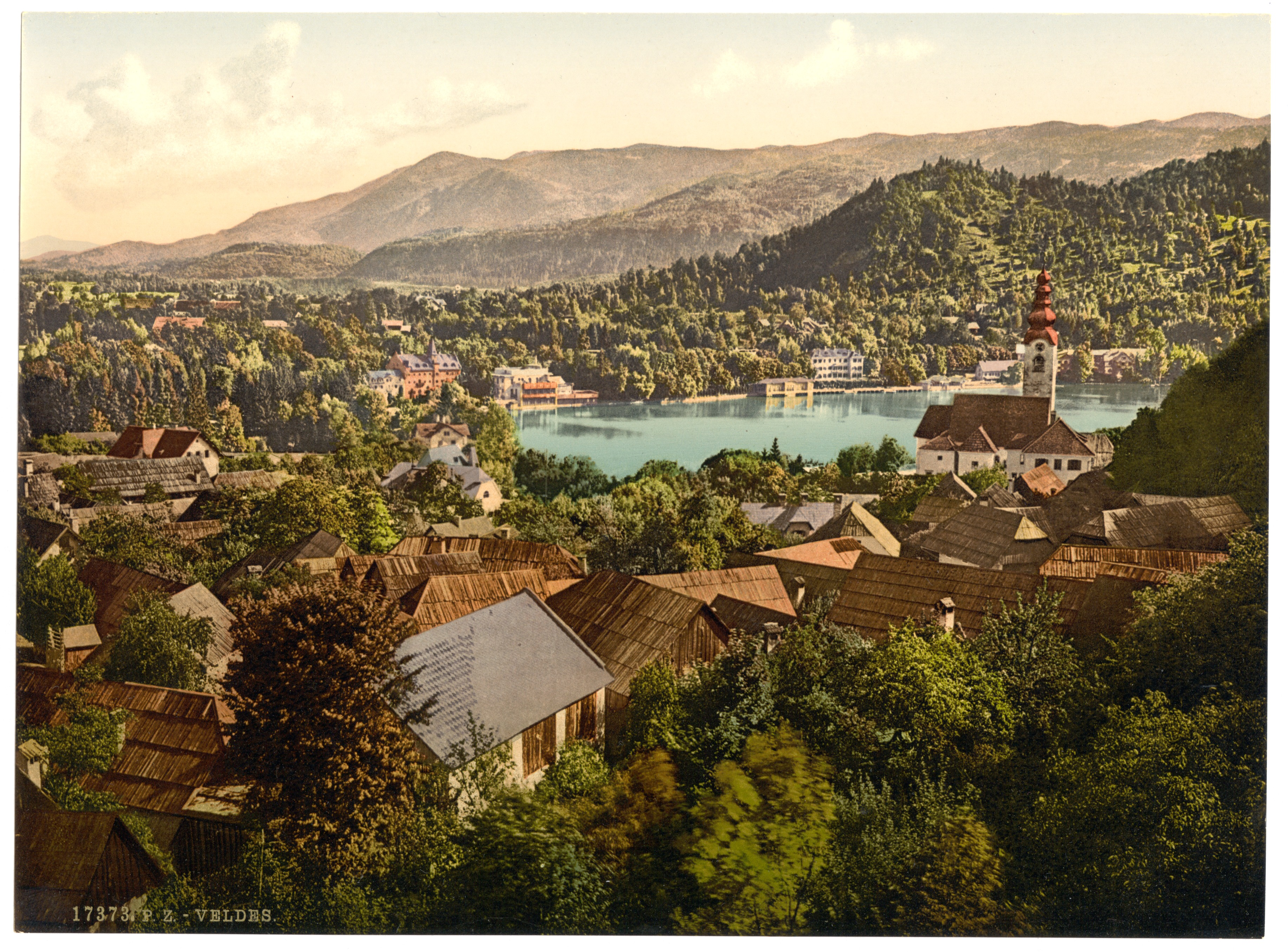
Panorama of Bled, late 19th century

A settlement area since Mesolithic times, the present-day locality probably arose about 600 during the Slavic settlement of the Eastern Alps. After the Slavic principality of Carantania was conquered by Frankish forces in 788, the area came under Bavarian influence.

=== Feudal estate ===
German King Henry II ceded ownership of the area in 1004 to Albuin, Bishop of Brixen as a sign of gratitude for the assistance the Church was giving to the king in his attempt to strengthen imperial rule in that part of northern Italy. In 1011, Henry II signed another deed of donation that added the castle and an area of land the size of thirty king's farms. That area, between the Sava Bohinjka and the Sava Dolinka, became known as the Lordship of Veldes (German: Herrschaft Veldes). These donations marked a turning point in the history of Bled and, for the following 800 years, the area remained under the sovereignty of the prince-bishops of Brixen.

The bishops very seldom visited their remote possession 300 km away. Initially, the lordship was administered by ministeriales (bonded knights), castellans, and castle staff in accordance with feudal practices, but in the middle of the 14th century the prince-bishops decided instead to lease the estate. Under one of the 16th-century lessees, Bled Castle became a Protestant stronghold for a time. When the leasehold era came to an end, the prince-bishops began to appoint governors to manage their distant lordship. Until the middle of the 18th century, those administrators were exclusively aristocratic, but later they included non-nobles.

In 1803, Brixen's rule came to an end when the prince-bishopric was secularized in the course of the German Mediatization. Bled then came under Austrian sovereignty but in 1808, along with Carniola, it was included in the Napoleonic Illyrian Provinces. It returned under Austrian sovereignty in 1813, and in 1838 the Austrian Emperor returned Bled to the bishops of Brixen as a private estate. With the abolition of the feudal system in 1848, Bled ceased to have the characteristics of a feudal economy and from then on it experienced several changes in ownership, including industrialists and a bank.

After the dissolution of Austria-Hungary in 1918, Bled and the rest of Carniola came under the rule of the Kingdom of Yugoslavia and became a summer domicile of the ruling House of Karađorđević, a tradition that Yugoslav leader Josip Broz Tito continued when he built his residence here in 1947.

=== Modern settlement ===
Today's town began to form in the mid-19th century from the villages of Grad, Mlino, Rečica, Zagorice, and Želeče, which encircled the lake. At that time, farmers started to sell the land along the eastern lakeshore to wealthy individuals for their villas, and the villages of Grad, Zagorice, and Želeče began to merge. Bled was officially made a town in 1960.

== Tourism ==
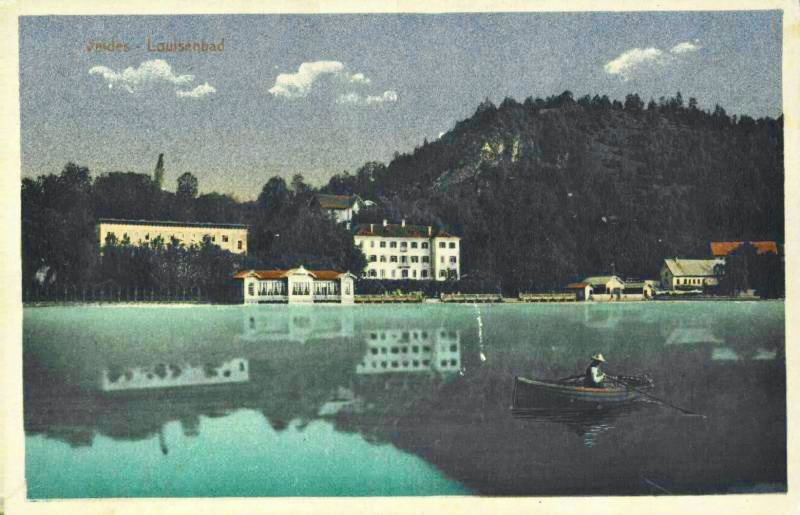
Bled hotels in 1910

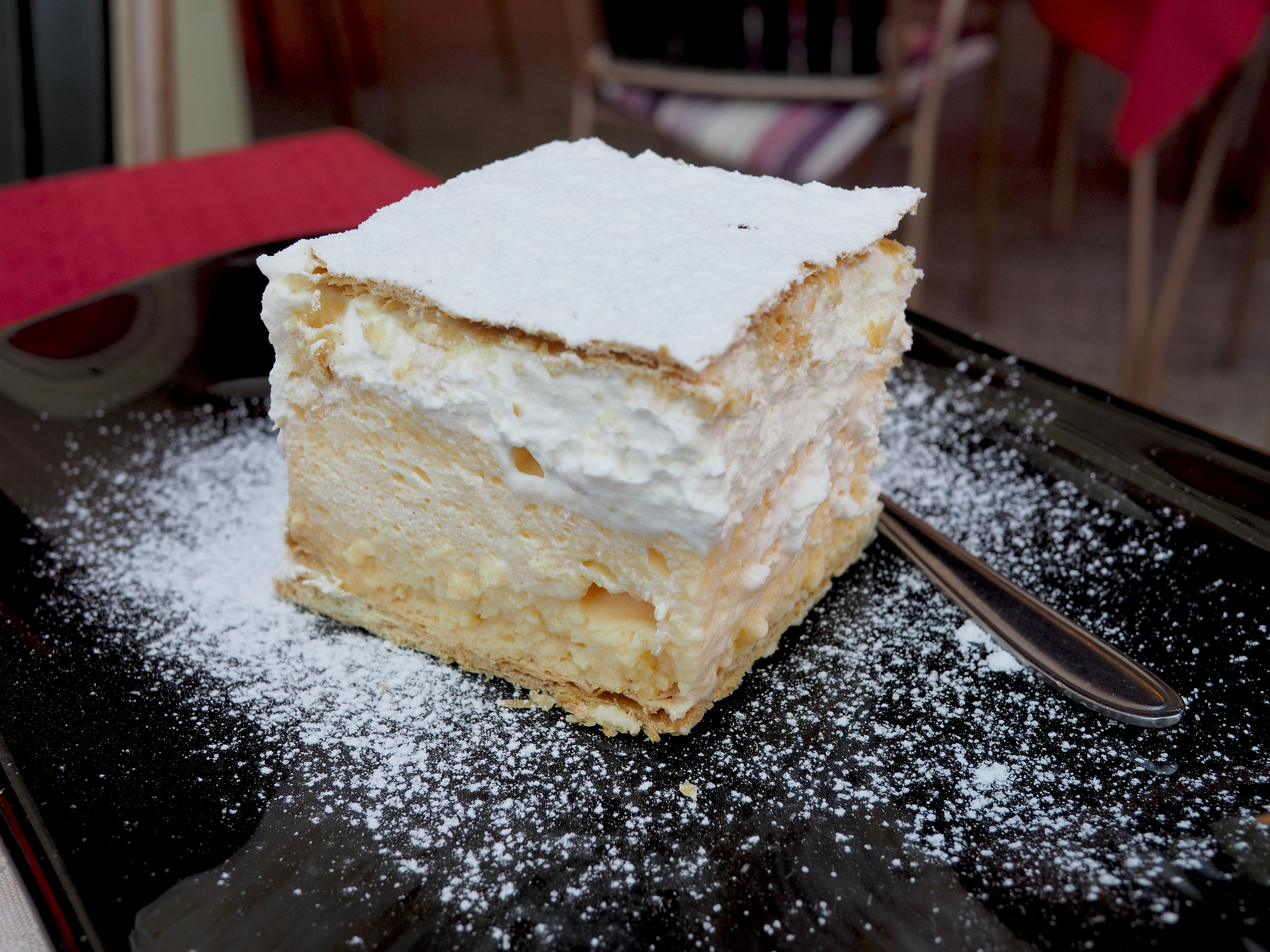
Bled Cremeschnitte

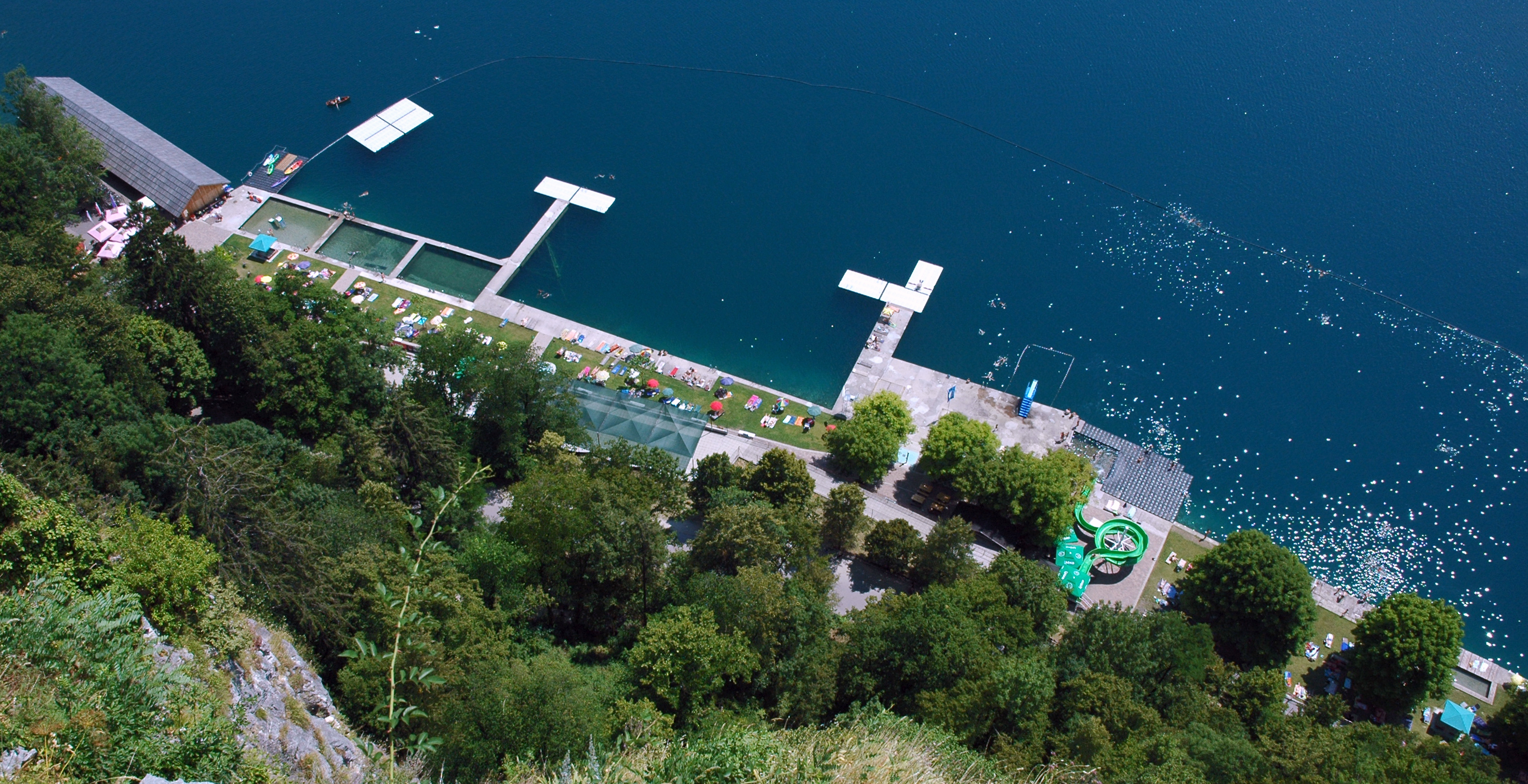
Below the Bled Castle cliffs sits a public pool area on the lake.

Bled is known for the glacial Lake Bled, which makes it a major tourist attraction. Perched on a rock overlooking the lake is the iconic Bled Castle. The town is also known in Slovenia for its vanilla and cream pastry (Slovene: kremšnita, kremna rezina).

Naturopath Arnold Rikli (1823–1906) from Switzerland contributed significantly to the development of Bled as a health resort in the second half of the 19th century. Due to its mild climate, Bled has been visited by aristocratic guests from all across the world. Today it is an important convention centre and tourist resort, offering a wide range of sports activities (golf, fishing, and horseback riding). It is a starting point for mountain treks and hikes, especially within nearby Triglav National Park.

A small island in the middle of the lake is home to the Assumption of Mary Pilgrimage Church; visitors frequently ring its bell, due to an old legend claiming it provides good luck.

Human traces from prehistory have been found on the island. Before the church was built, there was a temple consecrated to Živa, the Slavic goddess of love and fertility. One can get to the island on a traditional flat-bottomed wooden boat (Slovene: pletna), part of a fixed fleet of 23 boats to protect the lake's cleanliness, run by a family-owned business since the 18th century. The island on Lake Bled has 99 steps. A local tradition at weddings is for the husband to carry his new bride up these steps, during which the bride must remain silent.

== Transport ==
The town is served by two railway stations: Lesce-Bled (located in nearby Lesce) on the main line between Ljubljana and Villach Hauptbahnhof, and Bled Jezero (located above the western shore of Lake Bled) on the Bohinj Railway. Slovenia's main international airport, Ljubljana Jože Pučnik Airport, is 34 km away by road; Lesce-Bled Airport caters to general aviation.

== Events ==
Bled has hosted the World Rowing Championships four times, in 1966, 1979, 1989, and most recently in 2011.

In 1959, the first 14 rounds of the 4th Chess Candidates Tournament were held in this city, the rest were played in Zagreb and in Belgrade.

In 1961, the Grand Hotel Toplice in Bled was the site of one of the most important international tournaments in chess history. In 2002, the 35th Chess Olympiad was held in the city.

Bled hosts one of the largest Lindy Hop events, known as "Swing Bled".

In December 2024, the city hosted the Division IA tournament for the 2025 World Junior Ice Hockey Championships at the Bled Ice Arena. The city would again host the following year for 2026.

== Notable people ==
Notable people that were born or lived in Bled include:

- Prince Andrew of Yugoslavia was born in 1929 in Bled.
- Iztok Čop (born 1972), rower, multiple Olympic medalist
- Peter Florjančič (1919–2020), inventor and Olympic athlete
- Janez Klemenčič (born 1971), rower, Olympic bronze medalist. Now a restaurateur in Bled.
- Karel Mauser (1918–1977), poet and author
- Valentin Plemel (1820–1875), botanist
- Josip Plemelj (1873–1967), mathematician
- Špela Pretnar (born 1973), skier, Olympic athlete
- Marija Šuštar (1905–1989), ethnochoreologist and folklorist

== International relations ==
=== Twin towns / sister cities ===
Bled is twinned with:

- Brixen, Italy
- Doberdò del Lago, Italy
- Henley-on-Thames, England, United Kingdom
- Velden am Wörther See, Austria
- Vračar (Belgrade), Serbia

== See also ==
- St. Martin's Parish Church, Bled
