= Bled Castle =

Castle in Slovenia

- Blejski grad
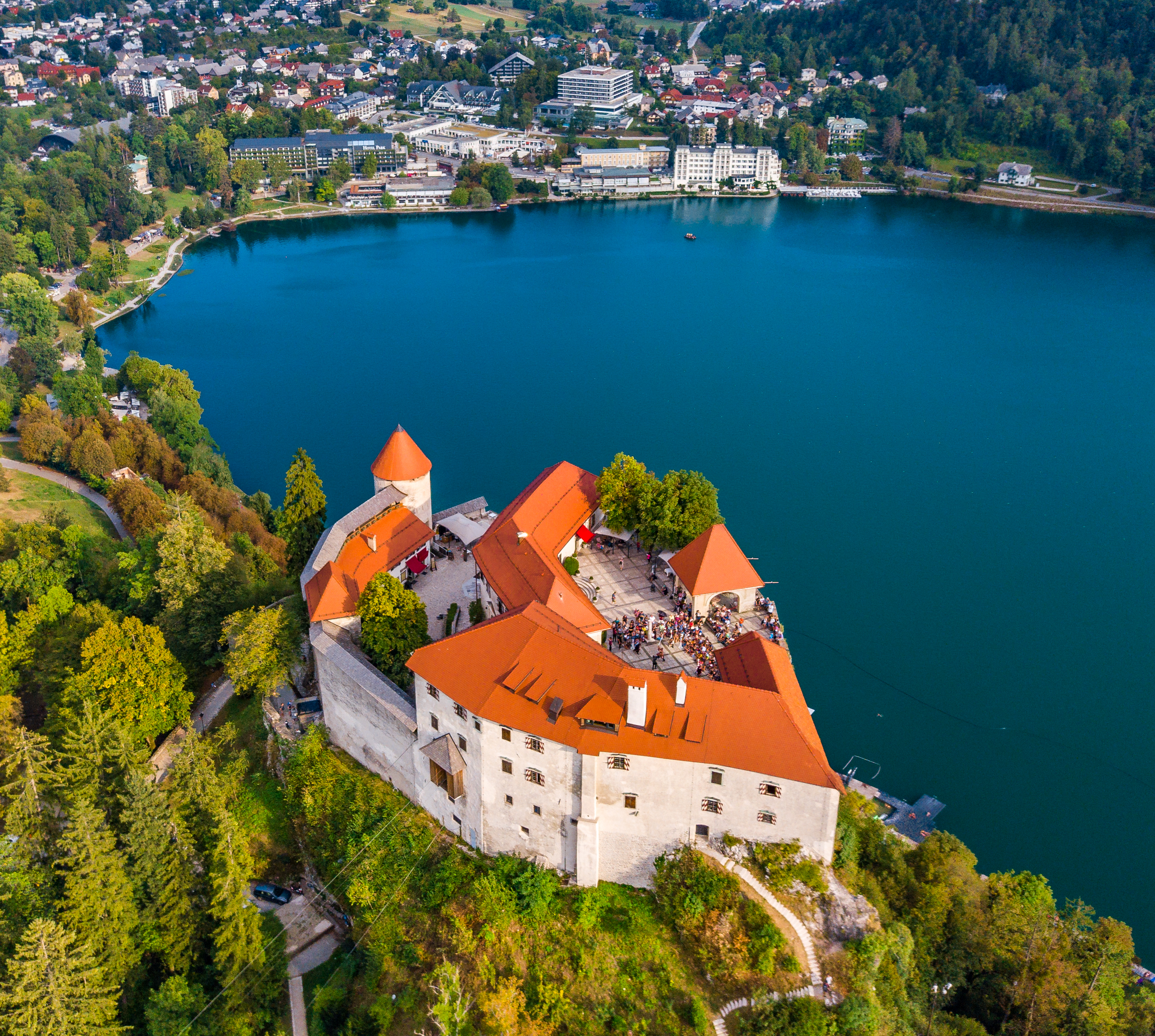
- View of Bled Castle

General information
- Type: Medieval castle
- Architectural style: Renaissance, Romanesque walls
- Town or city: Bled
- Country: Slovenia
- Coordinates: 46°22′11″N 14°06′02″E
- Elevation: 599

References
- giskd2s.situla.org (archived)

Bled Castle (Slovene: Blejski grad, German: Burg Veldes) is a medieval castle built on a precipice above the city of Bled in Slovenia, overlooking Lake Bled. According to written sources, it is the oldest Slovenian castle and is currently one of Slovenia's most visited tourist attractions. Nowadays, the castle is a historical museum with a collection representing the lake's history.

== History and structures ==
The castle was first mentioned in a deed of donation issued by Emperor Henry II to the bishops of Brixen on May 22, 1011. The castle remained as the residence of the bishops for eight centuries. At the time of the deed of donation, the area belonged to the March (or Margraviate) of Carniola in the Holy Roman Empire, but in 1278 it passed to the Austrian House of Habsburg.

The oldest part of the castle is the Romanesque tower. In the Middle Ages more towers were built and the fortifications were improved. Other buildings were constructed in the Renaissance style. The buildings are arranged around two courtyards, which are connected with a staircase. There is a chapel in the upper courtyard, which was built in the 16th century and renovated around 1700 when it was also painted with illusionist frescoes. The castle also has a drawbridge over a moat.

== Gallery ==
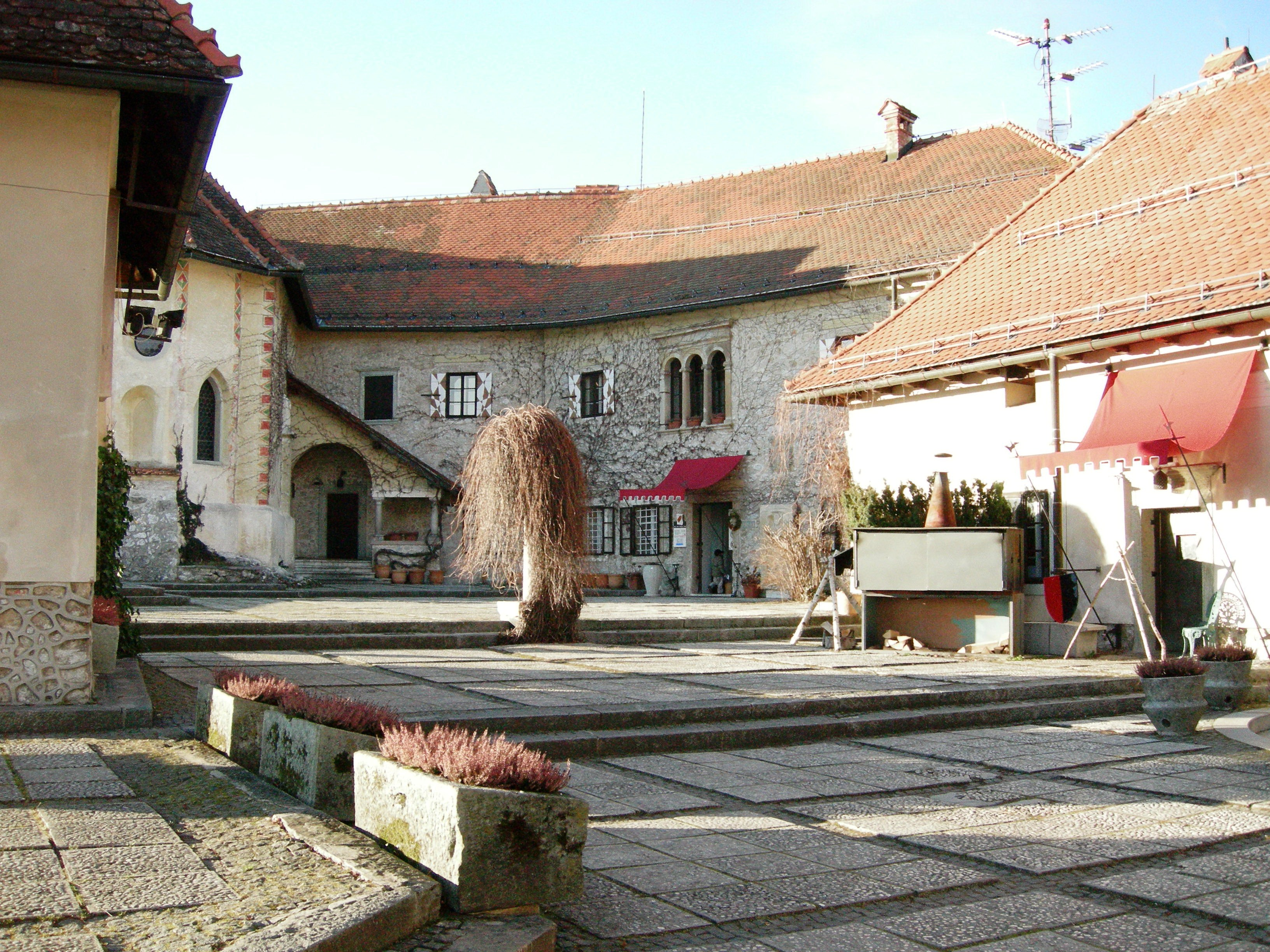
Upper courtyard with residence and the Gothic castle chapel

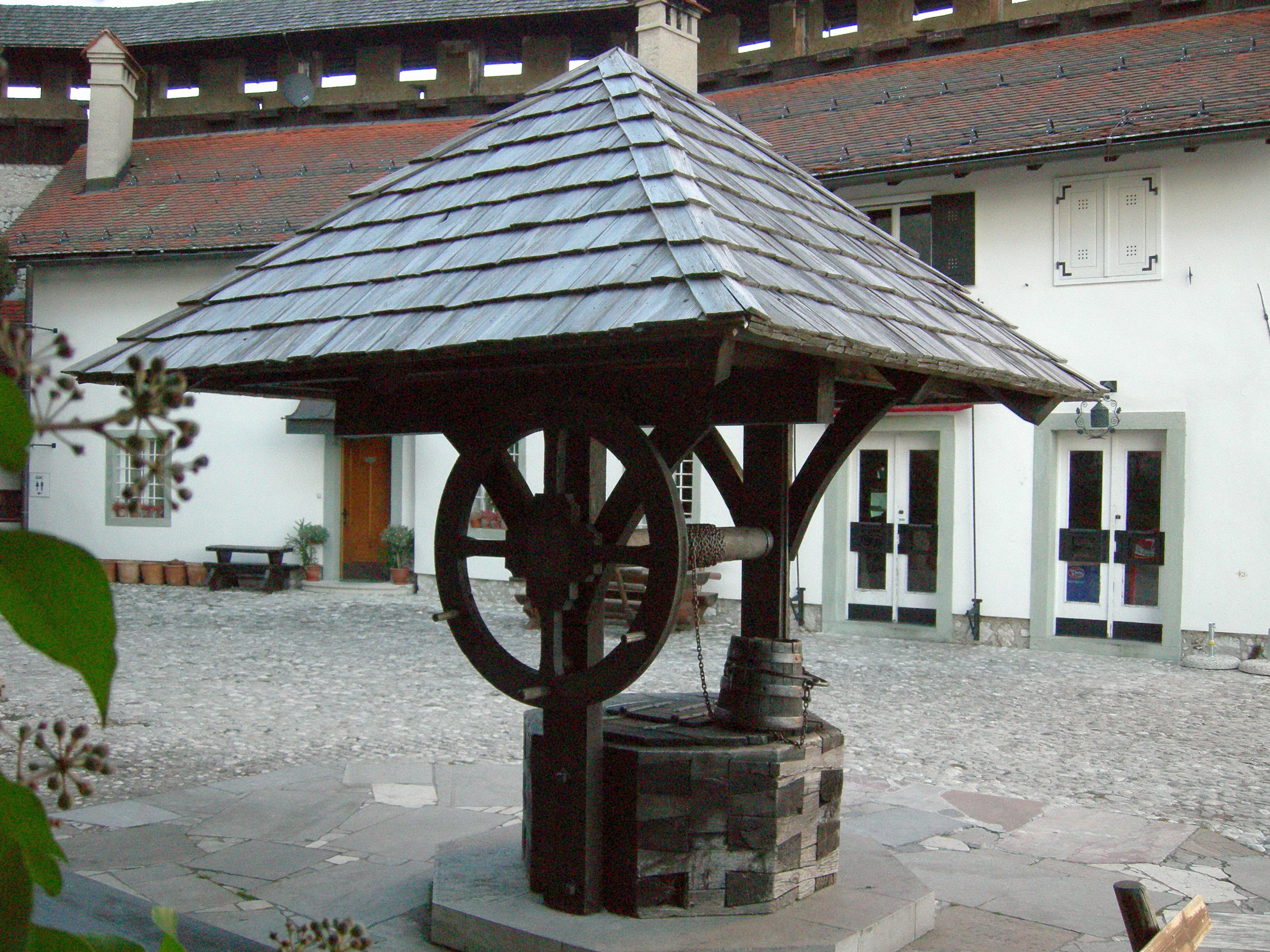
Lower courtyard with castle outbuildings

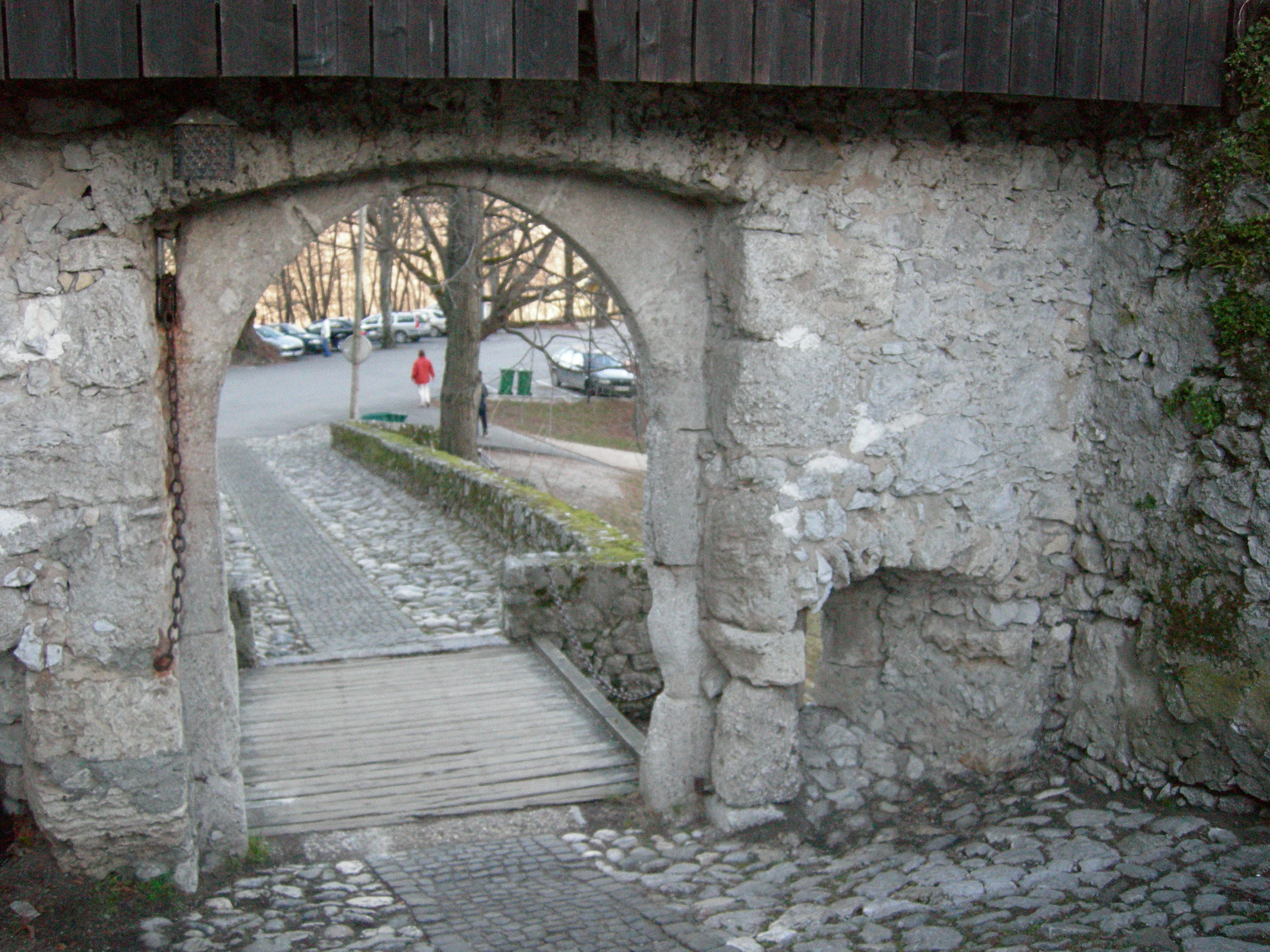
Castle entrance

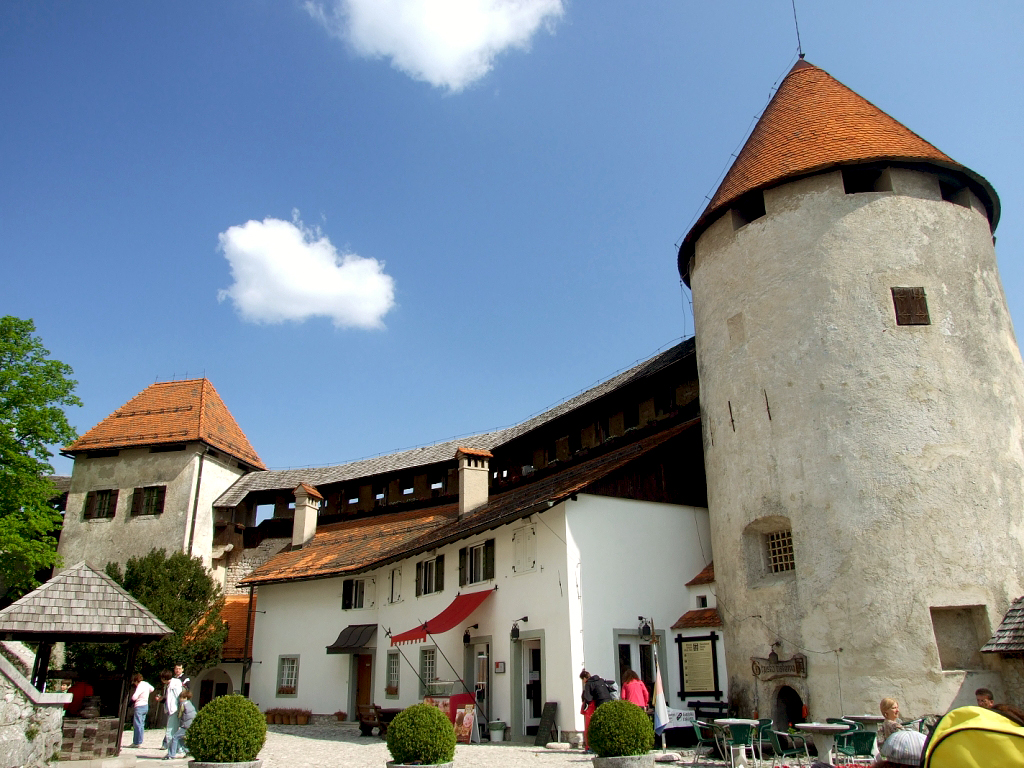
Buildings around the lower courtyard

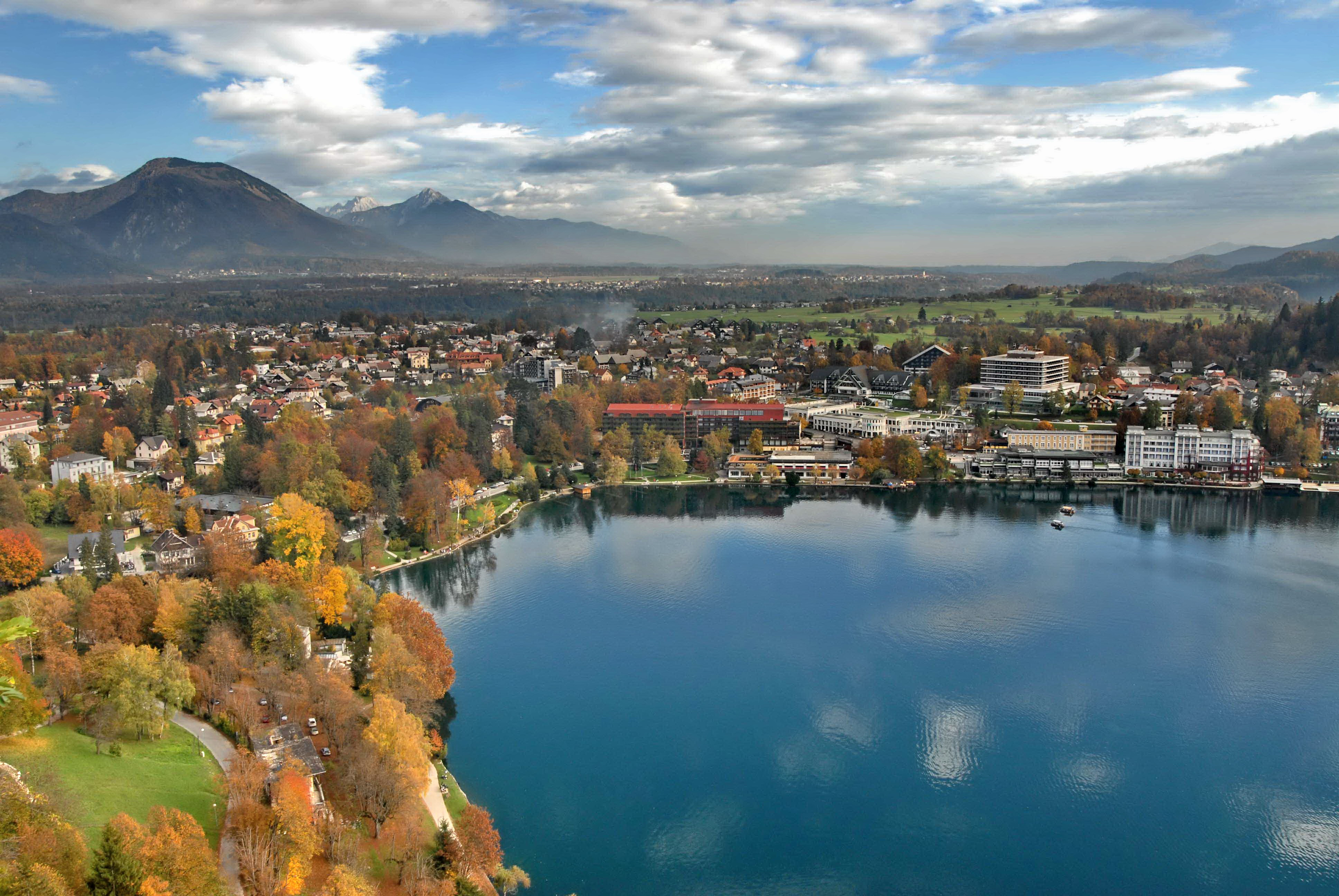
View from Bled Castle

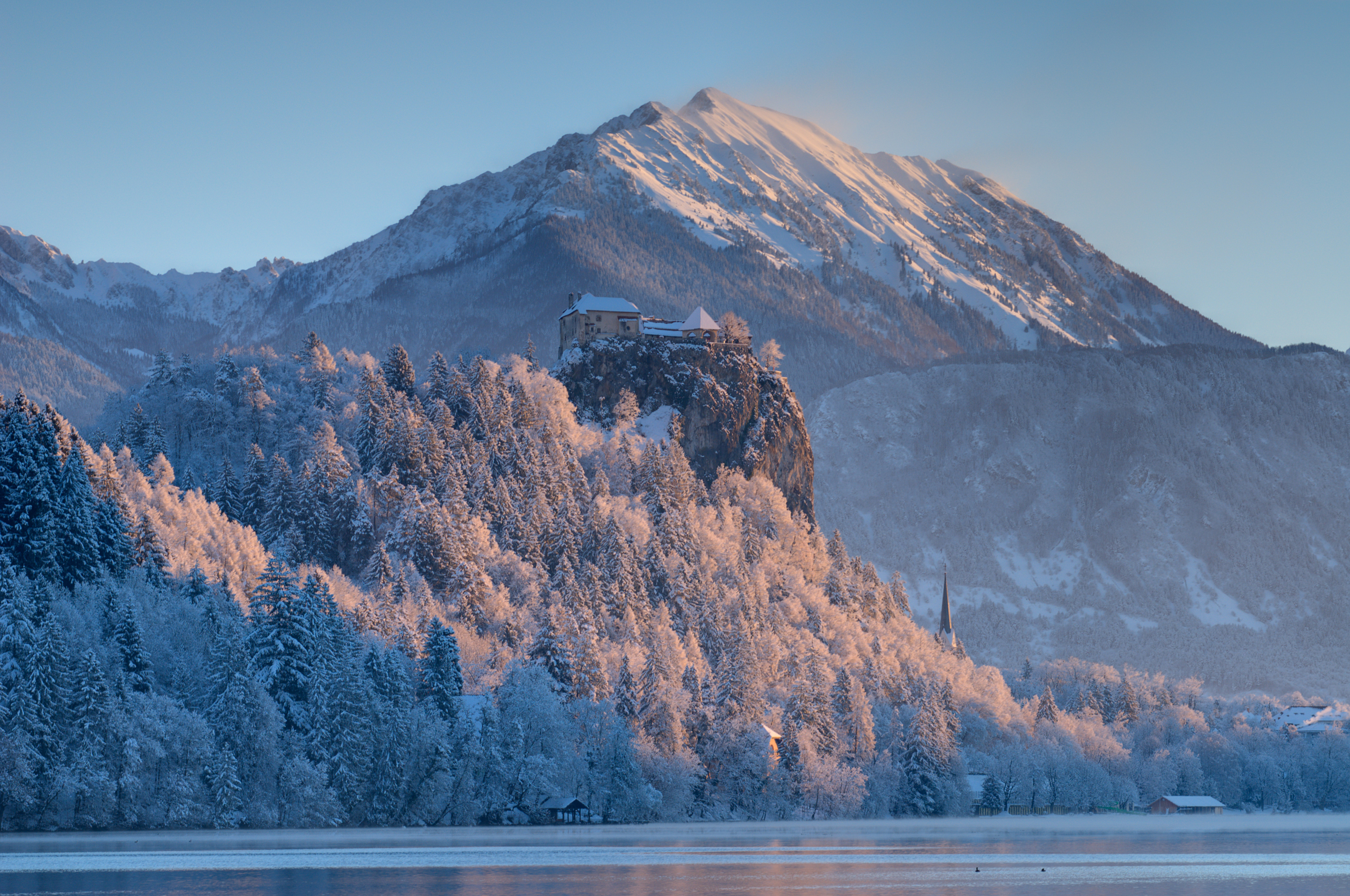
Bled Castle in winter

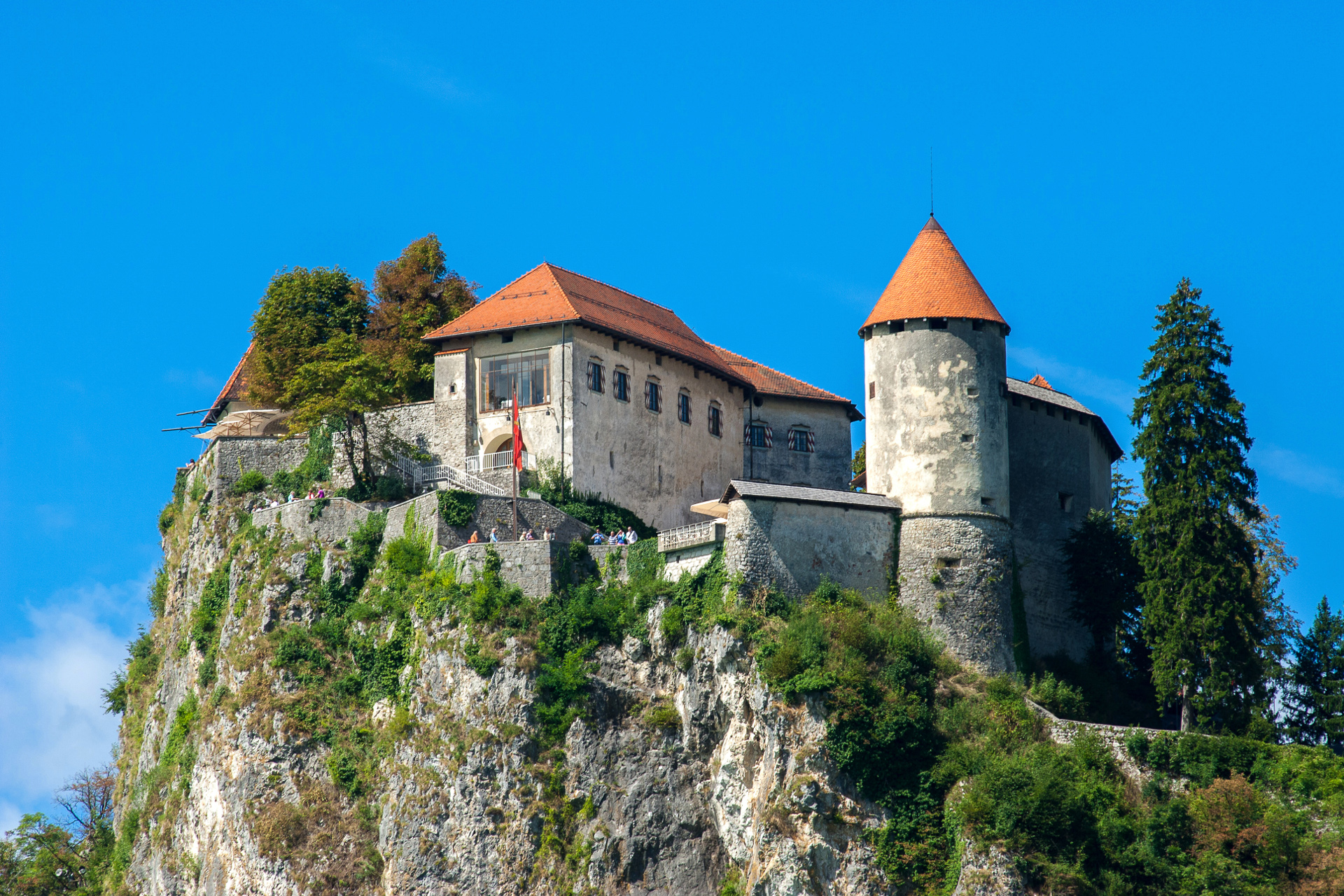
Bled Castle in late summer
