= Lake Bled =

Lake in northwestern Slovenia

- Blejsko jezero (Slovene)
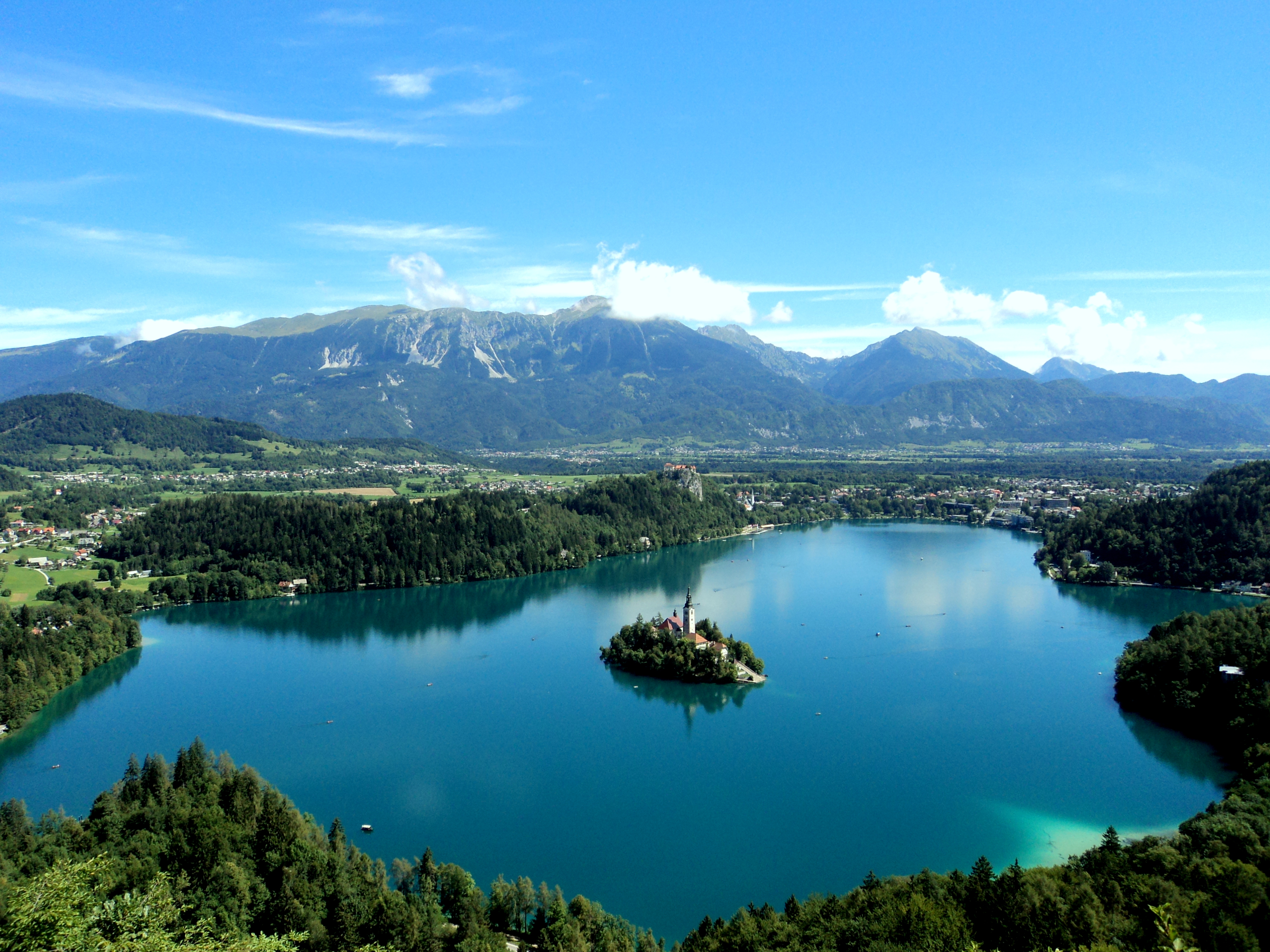
- Lake Bled seen from Little Osojnica Hill

- Location within Slovenia
- Location: Julian Alps
- Coordinates: 46°21′52″N 14°05′41″E
- Primary inflows: Natural springs, Mišca
- Primary outflows: Jezernica
- Basin countries: Slovenia
- Max. length: 2,120 m (6,960 ft)
- Max. width: 1,380 m (4,530 ft)
- Surface area: 1.45 km^{2} (0.56 sq mi)
- Max. depth: 29.5 m (97 ft)
- Water volume: 0.0257 km^{3} (0.0062 cu mi)
- Surface elevation: 475 m (1,558 ft)
- Islands: Bled Island
- Settlements: Bled

Lake Bled (Slovene: Blejsko jezero) is a lake in the Julian Alps of the Upper Carniolan region of northwestern Slovenia, where it adjoins the town of Bled. The area is a tourist destination. The lake is 35 km (22 mi) from Ljubljana International Airport and 55 km (34 mi) from the capital city, Ljubljana. Lake Bled is 4.2 km (2.6 mi) from the Lesce–Bled train station.

== Geography and history ==
The lake is of mixed glacial and tectonic origin. It is 2,120 m (6,960 ft) long and 1,380 m (4,530 ft) wide, with a maximum depth of 29.5 m (97 ft), and it has a small island. The lake lies in a picturesque environment, surrounded by mountains and forests.

Lake Bled was an important cult centre during the Bronze Age. Gold appliqués dating from the 13th-12th century BC were found in a deposit by the lake shore. The embossed decorations on the appliqués are thought to represent the solar and lunar years. Similar appliqués have been discovered in Switzerland, Bavaria and Hungary, mainly in Bronze Age fortified settlements and in the graves of wealthy women.

Medieval Bled Castle stands above the lake on the north shore and has a museum. The Zaka Valley lies at the west end of the lake.

The World Rowing Championships were held at Lake Bled in 1966, 1979, 1989, and 2011.

For centuries, Europeans have flocked to the shores of Lake Bled to enjoy recreation, but also the medicinal benefits. Emperor Henry II, ruler of the Holy Roman Empire, enjoyed the lake so much that he built Bled Castle in 1004 to confer it as an estate. Today the castle is a popular tourist attraction.

== Bled Island ==
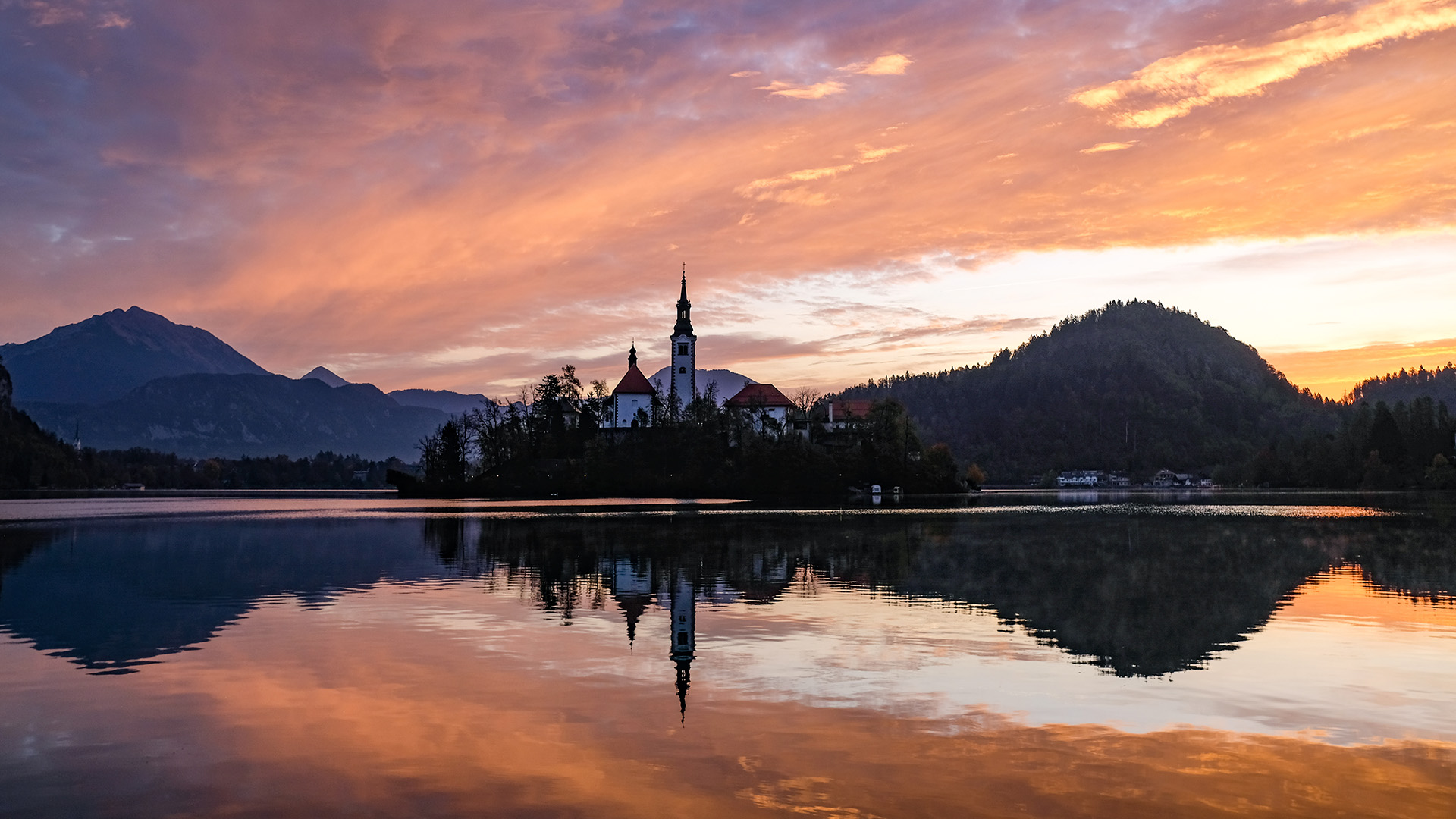
Sunrise at Lake Bled. The church on Bled Island has a 52-meter (171 ft) tower.

The lake surrounds Bled Island (Blejski otok). The island has several buildings, the main one being the pilgrimage church dedicated to the Assumption of Mary (Cerkev Marijinega vnebovzetja), built in its current form near the end of the 17th century. It is decorated with remains of Gothic frescos from around 1470 in the chancel, and with rich Baroque furnishing.

The church has a 52 m (171 ft) tower and there is a Baroque stairway dating from 1655 with 99 stone steps leading up to the building. The church is frequently visited and weddings are held there regularly. Traditionally it is considered good luck for the groom to carry his bride up the steps on the day of their wedding before ringing the bell and making a wish inside the church.

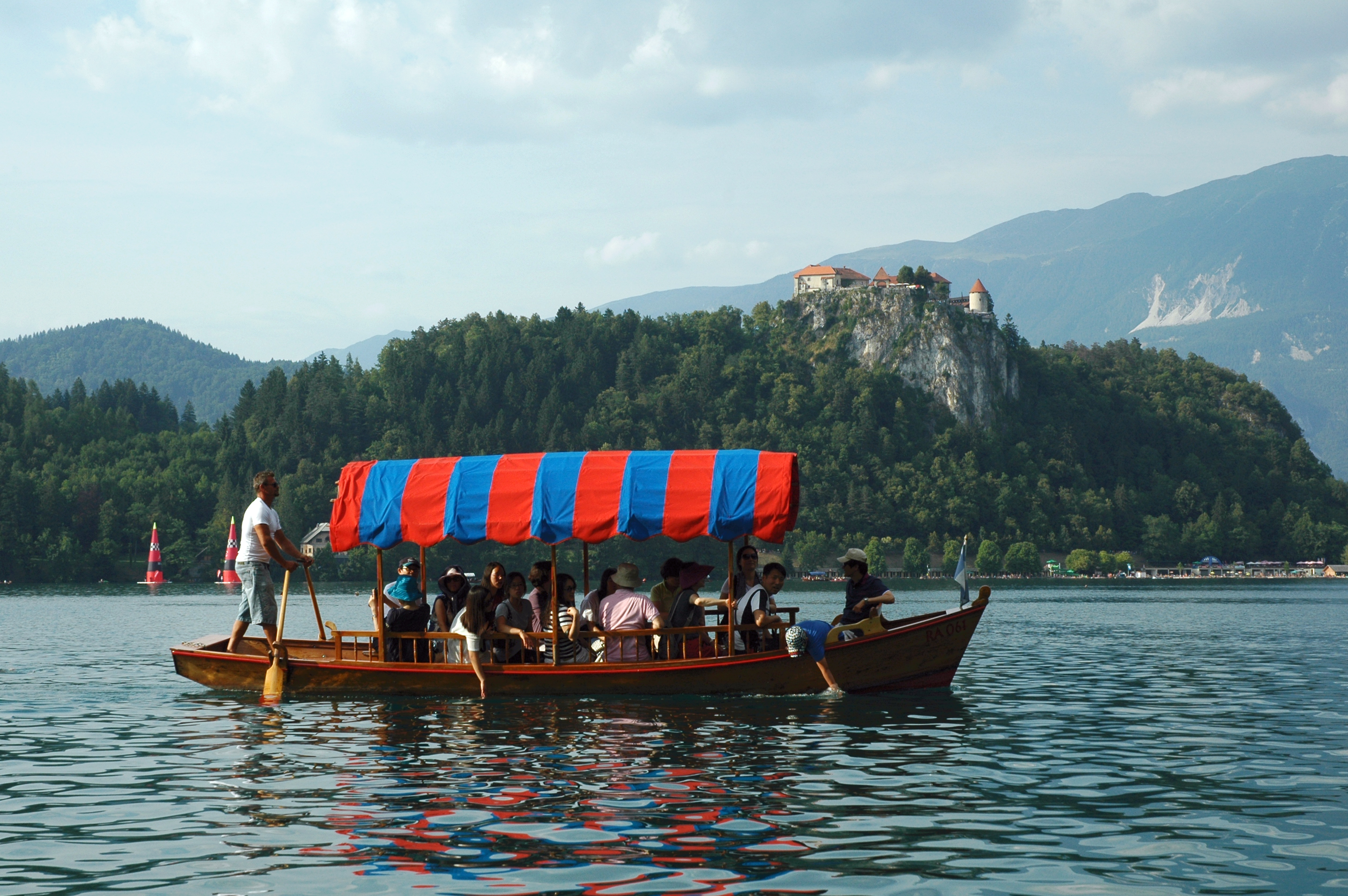
A modern pletna shows tourists around the lake.

The traditional transportation to Bled Island is a wooden boat known as a pletna. The word pletna is a borrowing from Bavarian German Plätten 'flat-bottomed boat'. Some sources claim the pletna was used in Lake Bled as early as AD 1150, but most historians date the first boats to AD 1590.

Similar in shape to Italian gondolas, a pletna seats 20 passengers. Modern boats are still made by hand and are recognizable by their colorful awnings. Pletna oarsman employ the stehruder (standing rowing) technique to propel and navigate boats across the lake using two oars. The role of the oarsman dates back to 1740, when Maria Theresa of Austria granted 22 local families exclusive rights to ferry religious pilgrims across Lake Bled to worship on Bled Island. The profession is still restricted. Many modern oarsmen descend directly from the original 22 families.

== Gastronomy ==
The area's culinary specialty, a cream pastry (kremna rezina or kremšnita 'Cremeschnitte'), was designated a protected dish of designated origin in 2016 by the Slovene government. Slovene cream pastries date back to the Habsburg era. The current "official" recipe was created in 1953 by Ištvan Lukačević, the former manager of the Hotel Park's patisserie.

There is an annual festival dedicated to the pastry. It is estimated that 12 million cream pastries have been prepared at the Hotel Park's patisserie over the last 60 years.

== In popular media ==
Lake Bled is featured as a virtual world in the massively multiplayer online indoor exercise softwares MyWhoosh and EXR, for users to row on via an indoor rower machine.

== Gallery ==
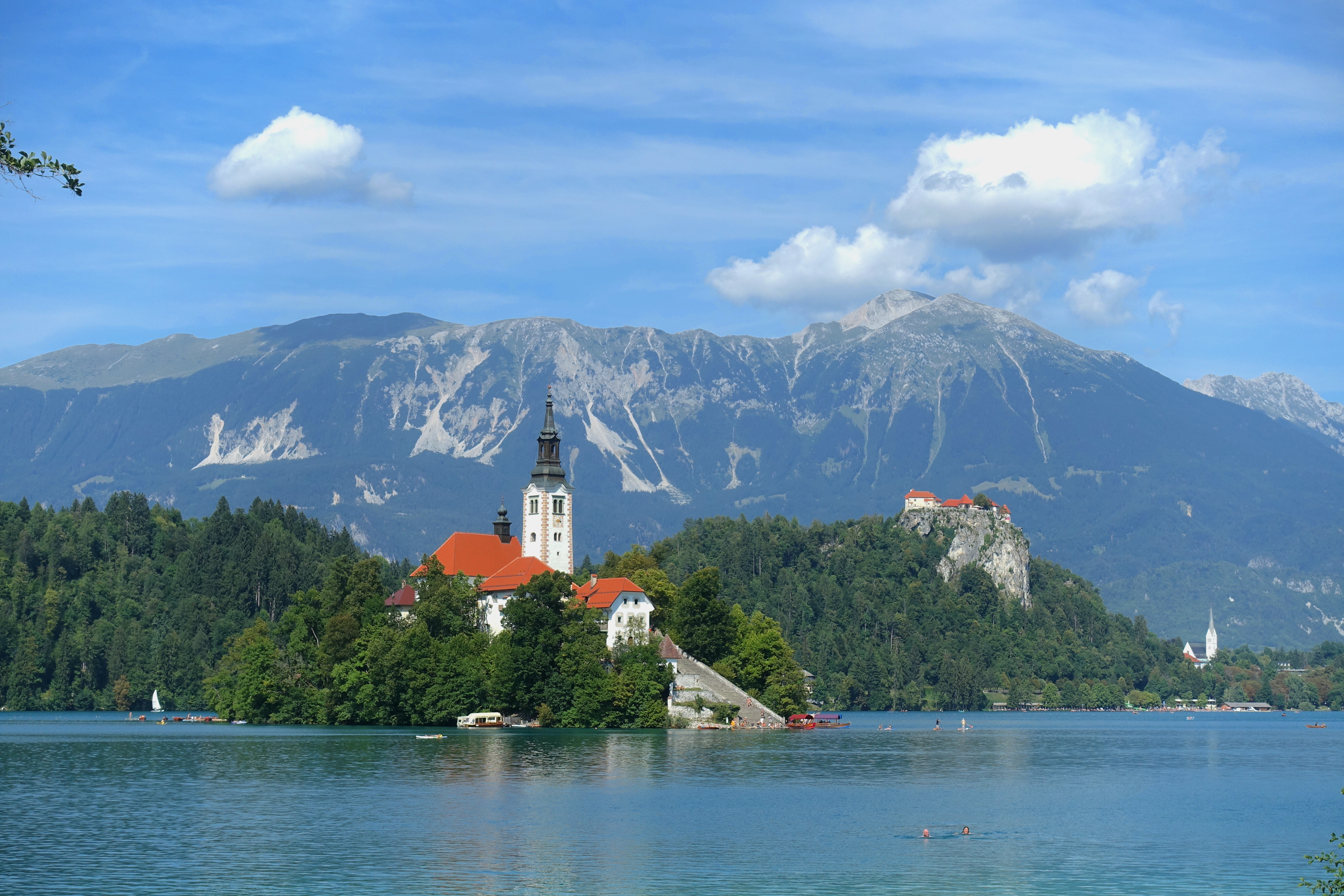
Bled Island with the church (left) and Bled Castle (right)

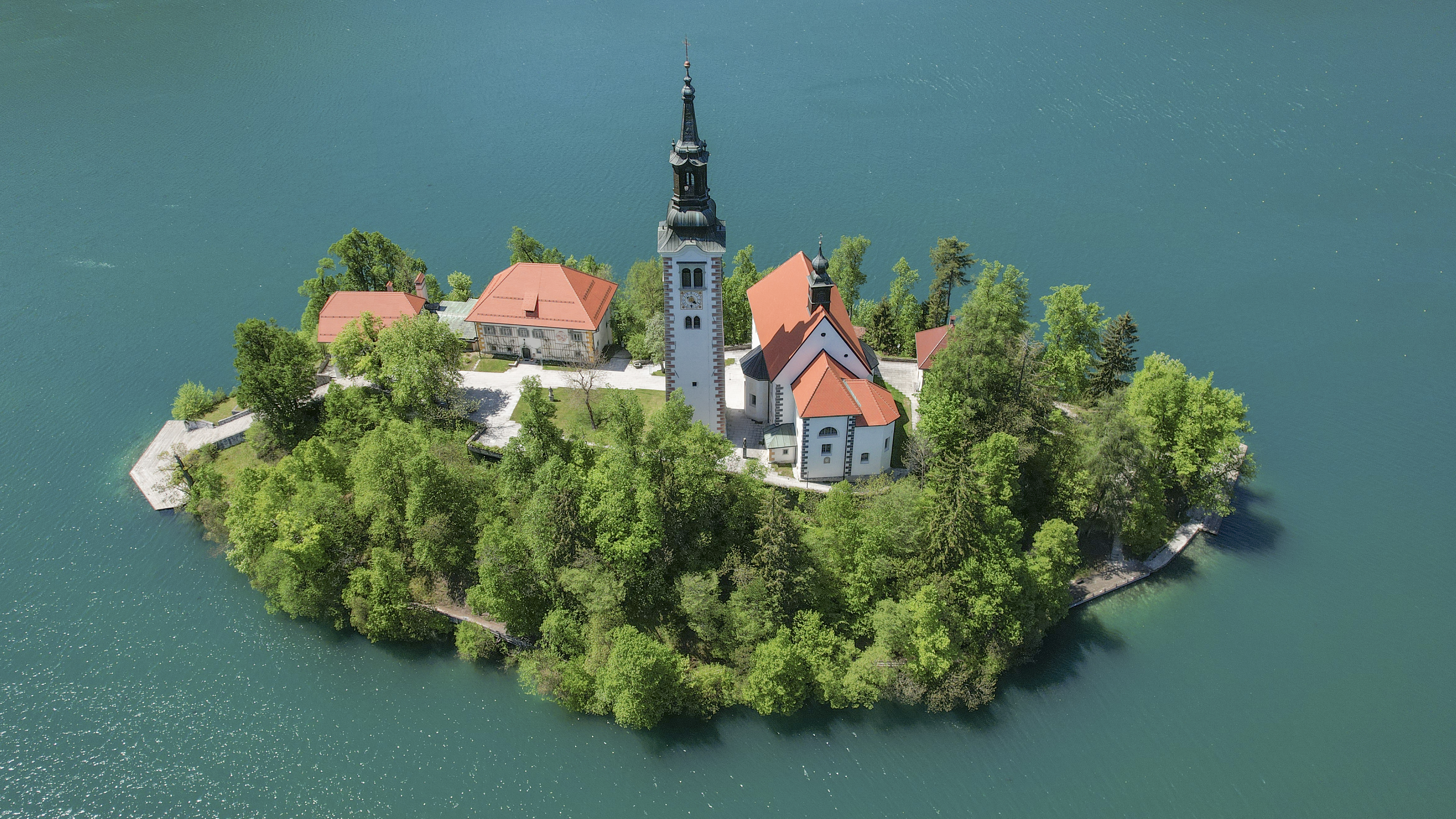
Bled Island

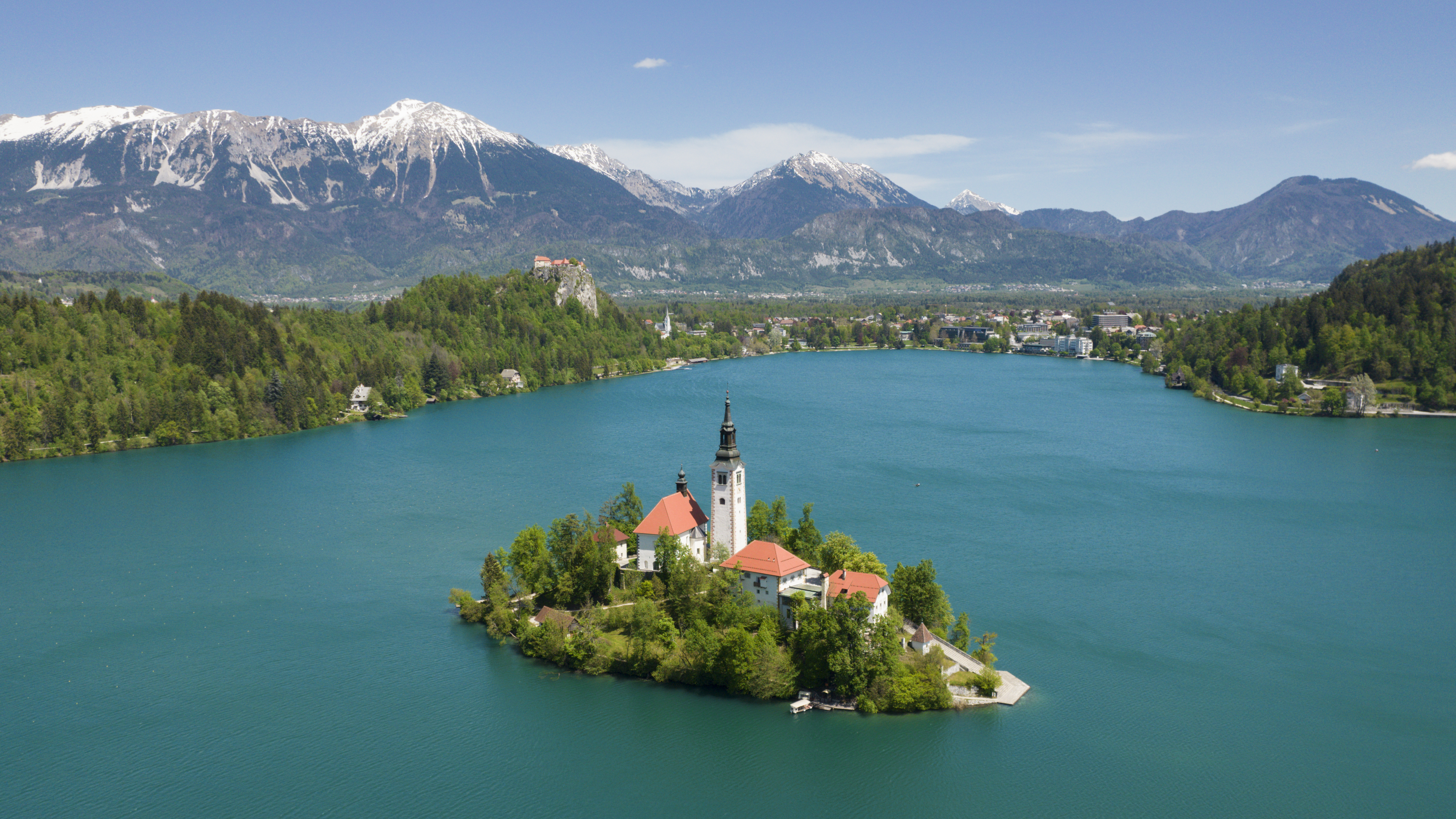
Bled Island with Bled Castle behind

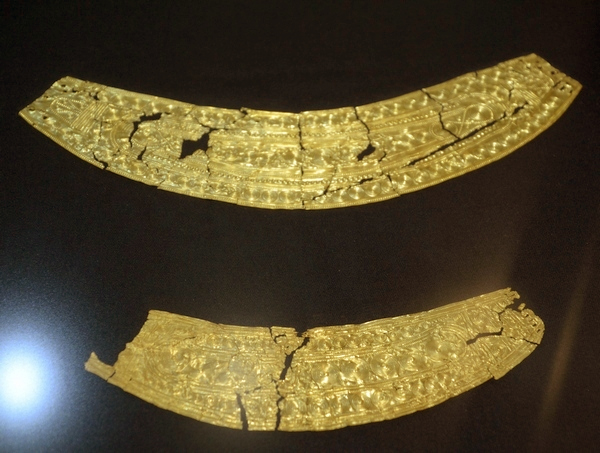
Gold appliqués from Lake Bled, Late Bronze Age, 13th–12th century BC

== See also ==
- Tourism in Slovenia
