= Koroška Bela =

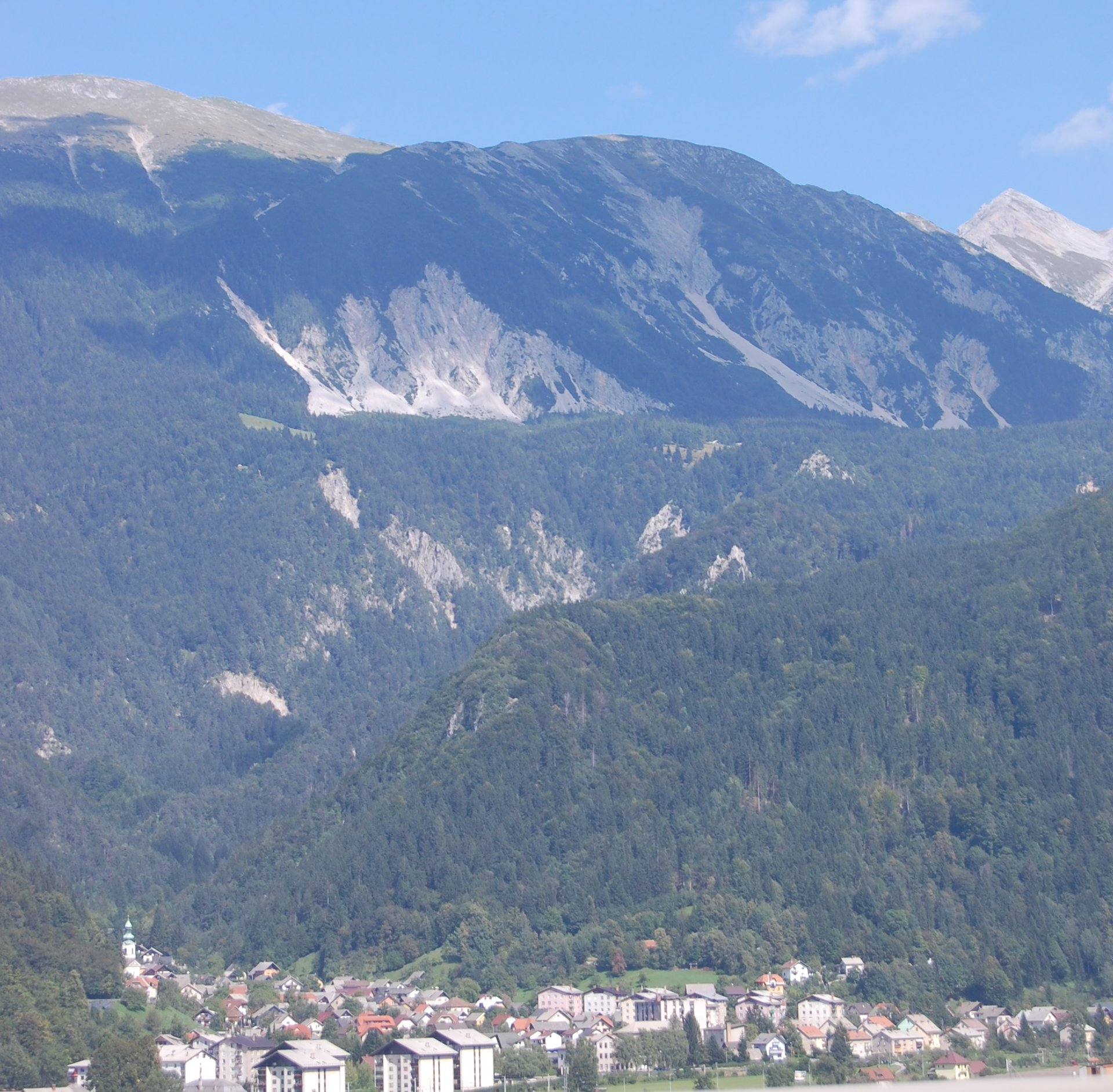
- Koroška Bela: view toward the NE, with the Karawanks in the background

- Location in Slovenia
- Coordinates: 46°26′12″N 14°6′7″E
- Country: Slovenia
- Traditional region: Upper Carniola
- Statistical region: Upper Carniola
- Municipality: Jesenice
- Established: late 10th century
- Elevation: 595 m (1,952 ft)

Population (2002)
  - Total: 2,206

Koroška Bela (pronounced [kɔˈɾóːʃka ˈbéːla]; German: Kärntner Vellach) is a settlement in the Municipality of Jesenice in northwestern Slovenia. The village has long been a center of iron mining and processing; until recently a majority of its inhabitants were employed in the steel industry.

== Geography ==
Koroška Bela is located in the mouth of a narrow valley cut by Bela Creek into the southern slopes of the Karawanks. The valley is hemmed in by four hills: Malnež and Obesenk (to the east), and Alnica and Strana (northwest). The valley is closed off to the north by Mount Belščica; to the south it opens into Bela Field (Slovene: Belško polje), which borders the Sava River.

The source of Bela Creek is below the peak of Belščica, between Potoki Pasture (Potoška planina) and Olip Pasture (Olipova planina). The creek runs through the east side of the village, but dissipates in Bela Field before reaching the Sava. The border with the neighboring settlement of Javornik runs along Javornik Creek, which does reach the Sava.

== Name ==
The name Koroška Bela literally means 'Carinthian white'; the second part is derived from White Creek (Slovene: Bela) and was originally a hydronym transferred to the settlement along the creek. The first part of the name indicates that the settlement was colonized by arrivals from Carinthia in the Middle Ages; Carinthian dialect features can still be found in the local dialect, and the agricultural area of Borovje beneath the village shares the Slovene name of the Carinthian municipality of Ferlach. (See also Koroška Vas and Koroška Vas na Pohorju for similar names outside Carinthia.)

== History ==
The oldest settlement in the area of the modern Municipality of Jesenice, Koroška Bela was founded by the Bishopric of Brixen around the year 1000, at approximately the same time as nearby Bled. Slovenes had settled the surrounding area by the late 10th century, as attested both by archaeological and documentary evidence, notably the land deeds of peasants donating their lands to clergy or nobility, which record Slavic placenames by this date. During the 11th century, settlements in the Bled region included Grad, Zagorice, Želeče, Mlino, Koritno, Bodešče, Selo, Kupljenik, Rečica, Radovna, Podhom, Poljšica, Blejska Dobrava, Sebenje, and others.

Some local peasants remained free until after 1100, but gradually all farms in the area came under feudal control. The principal landlord was the see of Brixen, which in the 13th century began converting some of their serfs into semi-freemen, living on so-called "census" farms. During the 13th century, Koroška Bela was among the larger settlements of the Bled lordship; a 1253 urbar (survey-book) lists 15 such farms.

In the second half of the 14th century, the peasants' level of feudal obligation began to grow, with the introductions of the tithe and of mandatory servitude. High levels of debt began to lead to evictions. In 1515, the peasants of Radovljica, Bled, and Bohinj staged an unsuccessful revolt. The leaders of the insurgency were killed, and all participating households were taxed the "rebels' pfennig" in perpetuity, the financial pressure leading to additional revolts; around 100 minor and four major ones are recorded, as well as civil petitions to the Habsburg authorities for relief. In 1557, records show that three farmers (Luka Ambrožič, Ambrož Vidič, and Jurij Pretnar) and the village assembly filed a complaint due to harsh duties imposed on them.

The historian Johann Weikhard von Valvasor briefly mentions Koroška Bela in his 1689 The Glory of the Duchy of Carniola (under its German name of Karner Velach) as a hamlet below snowy mountains, inhabited by miners and iron ore-teamsters. By this period, local peasants owed the gentry 18 days of servitude a year, including the performance of such tasks as preparing firewood, shoveling snow, cleaning produce, and clearing pastures. One could buy out one's service obligations at a rate of three crowns a day. Circumstances began to improve during the late 18th century, with the reforms of Maria Theresia and Joseph II, by the reign of the former of which iron ore was being mined above the village, on the slopes of Belščica and on Ajdna.

On 27 June 1761, the entire village of 60 houses burned down, including the church. In 1789, torrential rains led to a major landslide; Cikla Hill slid into the village along the course of Bela Creek, burying 47 houses and many unfortunate residents.

During the late 18th century Franco-Austrian wars, Habsburg authorities had difficulties drafting soldiers in the area. Many young unmarried men had instead gone into hiding in the woods; the Austrian governor Ignaz Anton von Indermauer awarded the local peasant Janez Čop a letter of manumission from feudal obligations for apprehending draft dodgers.

While the front lines with Italy during the First World War ran well to the south, Koroška Bela did not escape the war, being badly damaged in an Italian air raid on August 14, 1917, which destroyed much of the housing stock and the church, but killed no one as warning leaflets had been dropped a day earlier.

The village's more recent history has been closely interrelated with that of Jesenice, with which it has gradually become increasingly connected. The newest (early 1980s-vintage) facilities of the Acroni steelmill complex were built outside the center of Jesenice at Belsko Field, directly below the village.

The village supports the Možnar cultural society, ("Mortar"), whose members fire mortars on special occasions. In 2004, at the ceremony marking the 1000th anniversary of Bled and concurrent opening of the Črni Kal Viaduct its members joined the RTV Slovenia symphony orchestra for a mortar-assisted performance of Tchaikovsky's 1812 Overture.

== Sts. Ingenuin and Albuin Church ==
The village church is dedicated to Sts. Ingenuin and Albuin, bishops of Säben Abbey from the 6th and 10th centuries, respectively. The chapel of nearby Bled Castle is also dedicated to the saints.

An original Gothic church dated to 1361, but was rebuilt and expanded in 1754, and again after a fire in 1761, the work being completed in 1771. It was made a parish church in 1875, and contains frescoes by Matej Sternen.
