= Sts. Ingenuin and Albuin Church =

Catholic church in Jesenice, Slovenia

Coordinates: 46°25′45.34″N 14°6′2.81″E

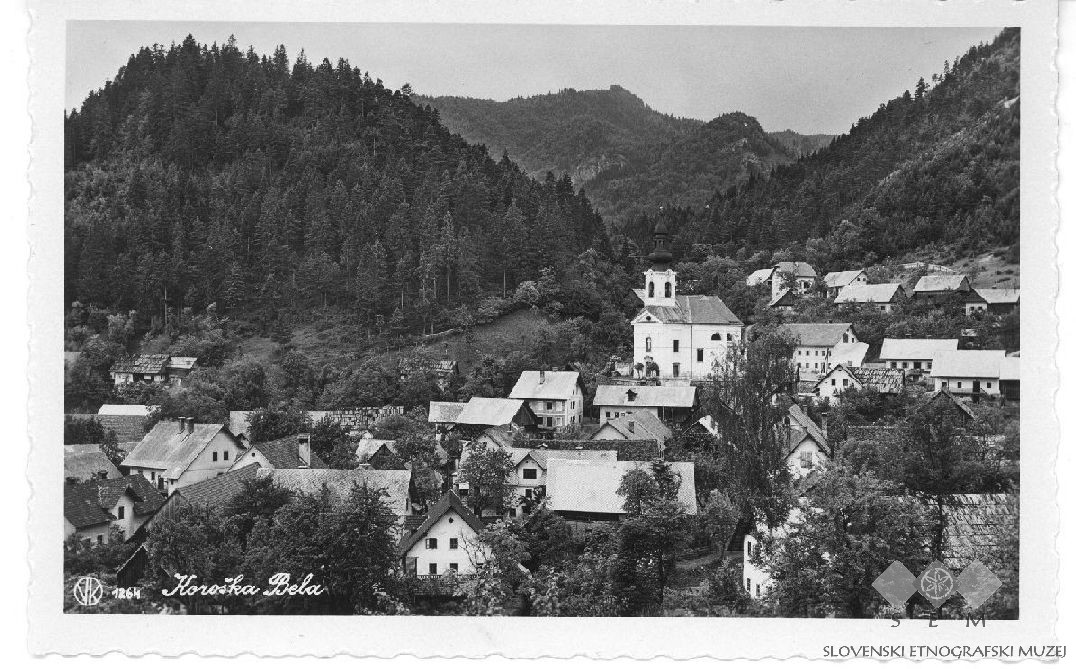
Sts. Ingenuin and Albuin Church

Sts. Ingenuin and Albuin Church (Slovene: Cerkev sv. Ingenuina in sv. Albuina) is a Catholic church located in the village of Koroška Bela, in the municipality of Jesenice in northwestern Slovenia. The church is dedicated to St. Ingenuin and St. Albuin, bishops of Säben Abbey from the 6th and 10th centuries respectively.

== History ==
A 14th-century Gothic church on the same site was also dedicated to the two saints, as is the chapel of nearby Bled Castle, which dates from roughly a century later. Consecration was on 26 April 1361; the altar of Saint Acacius (Slovene: Sv. Ahac) was dedicated the next year by John, bishop of Urbino and papal vicar general.

The building was sacked by Turkish Raiders in 1486, the altar was reconsecrated on 2 October of that year by Ljubljana bishop Sigismund Lambergar. In 1584, it was the site of confrontations between Catholics and Protestants during the Slovenian Reformation. The protestant minority was subsequently expelled from the area.

In 1691, the congregation was granted greater rights. By 1752, the local congregation had outgrown the dilapidated building, and a decision was reached to replace it. It is thought the architect of the new building was Matija Perski. Collection of funds began immediately; loans were extended by the churches at Blejska Dobrava, Rečica (now part of Bled), and Kupljenik pod Babjim Zobom. In addition to popular contributions, the then-parish church in Jesenice made a gift. The ironworking facilities in Javornik were unable to help due to financial difficulties.

The old church was demolished in 1754; the year is carved on the keystone of the main portico. Construction took seven years, and was sufficiently far along that consecration was planned for the feast of St. Peter and St. Paul of 1761 when - two days beforehand, on 27 June 1761 - the entire village of 60 houses burned down, including the church.

Reconstruction took ten years; the new church was finally consecrated on 3 September 1771 by Ljubljana Bishop Johann Karl von Herberstein. In 1788, the church was again granted greater privileges.

Due to a massive landslide the following year, furnishing the new church (which was itself left unharmed) had to be deferred. The only new element commissioned was the baroque altar of St. Ahac, kept fairly modest due to circumstances. Records describe it as a humble wooden structure with statues of the two patron saints in niches, below an oil painting of the saints before lake Bled.

The side altar of the Virgin of the Rosary was the work of Ignacij Arer (1776, restored around 1867). The ceiling was decorated by an unknown artist in 1828, but required repairs by 1858, performed by painter Matevž Goričnik. The 16-station Way of the Cross was the work of Alojzij Goetzl from Kranj. An organ was purchased from Kropa manufacturer Ignac Zupan, but was - due to poor quality - replaced in 1893 by a Gorščič organ, still there today. In 1875, the Koroška Bela parish was established, as a suffragan of Jesenice parish; St. Ingenuin and St. Albuin's became the parish church.

On June 2, 1875, the building was struck by lightning, killing the priest Valentin Plemlj and starting a fire which destroyed the belltower and roof. The village spent several years making external repairs, then returned to the project of beautifying the interior. In 1903 the current altar painting was purchased, the work of the artist Kaestner from Tirol. In 1906, the old wooden altar was replaced with a marble one carved by A. Rovšek of Ljubljana, and marble communion tables were added.

In 1916, due to the need for raw materials for the war effort, Austro-Hungarian soldiers removed the bells; one year later, on August 14, 1917, the village and church were badly damaged and set alight by an Italian air raid. The extent of the devastation was such that it took six years to rebuild the bell tower, and longer to fix the roof. Some traces of damage are still evident.

To date, the church has had to be significantly rebuilt four times.

During the 1920s, the interior frescoes were repainted by Matej Sternen. The current bells were blessed on 16 November 1986, while the facade of the church was restored in 1990. The fifth consecration of the altar of St. Ahac was on February 8, 1998.
