= Slamniki =

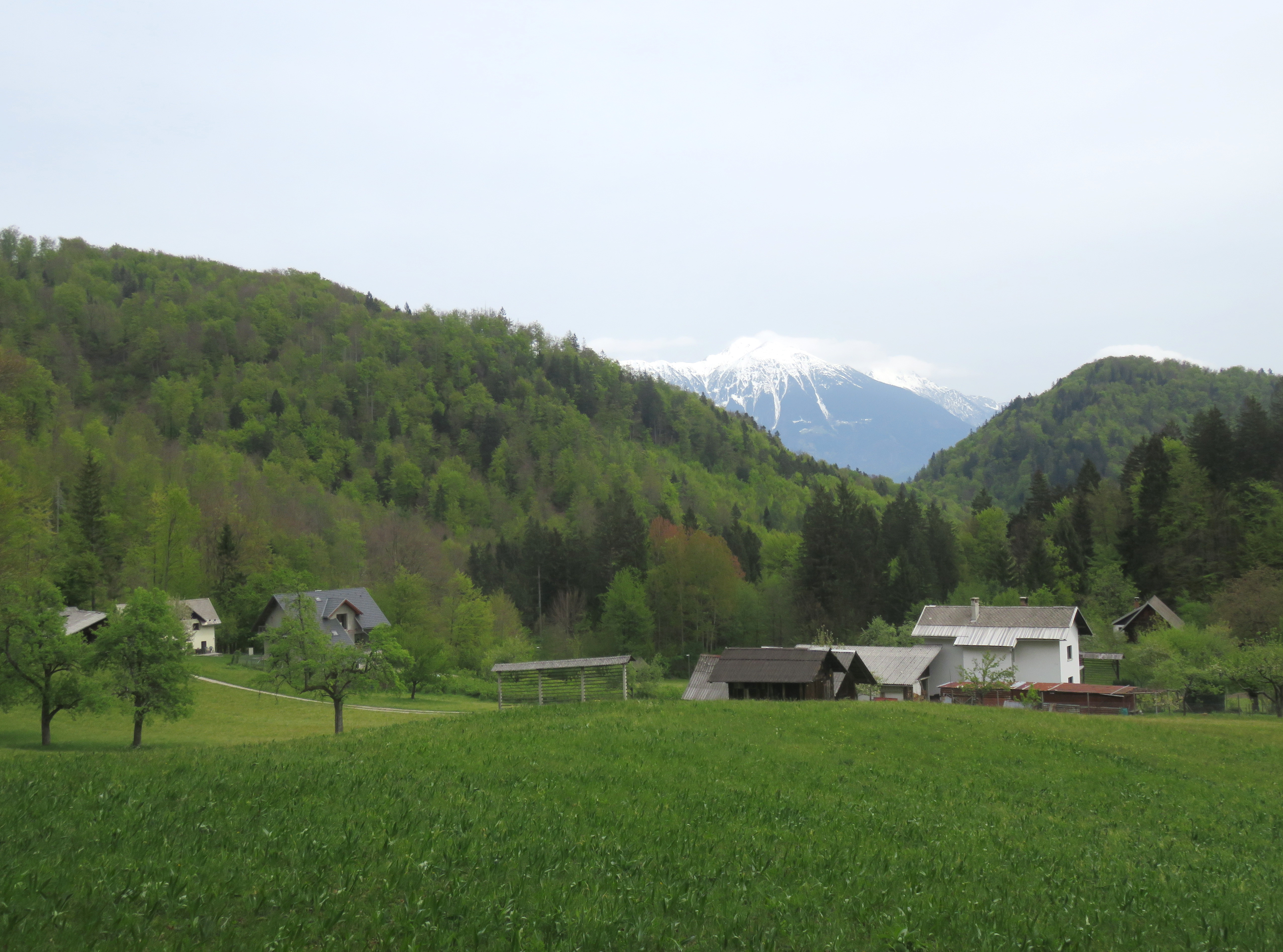

- Location in Slovenia
- Coordinates: 46°20′52.12″N 14°2′36.14″E
- Country: Slovenia
- Traditional Region: Upper Carniola
- Statistical region: Upper Carniola
- Municipality: Bled
- Elevation: 872.5 m (2,863 ft)

Population (2020)
  - Total: 18

Slamniki (pronounced [ˈslaːmniki]) is a small settlement above Bohinjska Bela in the Municipality of Bled in the Upper Carniola region of Slovenia.
