= Slavic settlement of the Eastern Alps =

The settlement of the Eastern Alps region by early Slavs took place during the 6th to 8th centuries CE. It formed part of the southward expansion of early Slavs which would result in the South Slavic group, and would ultimately result in the ethnogenesis of present-day Slovenes. The Eastern Alpine territories concerned comprise modern-day Slovenia, Eastern Friuli, in modern-day northeast Italy, and large parts of modern-day Austria (Carinthia, Styria, East Tyrol, Lower Austria and Upper Austria).

== Historical background ==
The migration of Slavic peoples from their homeland began in roughly the late 6th to early 7th century, as Germanic peoples started moving into the territory of the Roman Empire. The migrations were stimulated by the arrival of Huns into Eastern Europe. The Germanic peoples subsequently fought for control over territories in the eastern part of the disintegrating Roman Empire. Slavic tribes were part of various tribal alliances with the Germanic (Lombards, Gepids) and Eurasian (Avar, Bulgar) peoples.

== Evidence ==
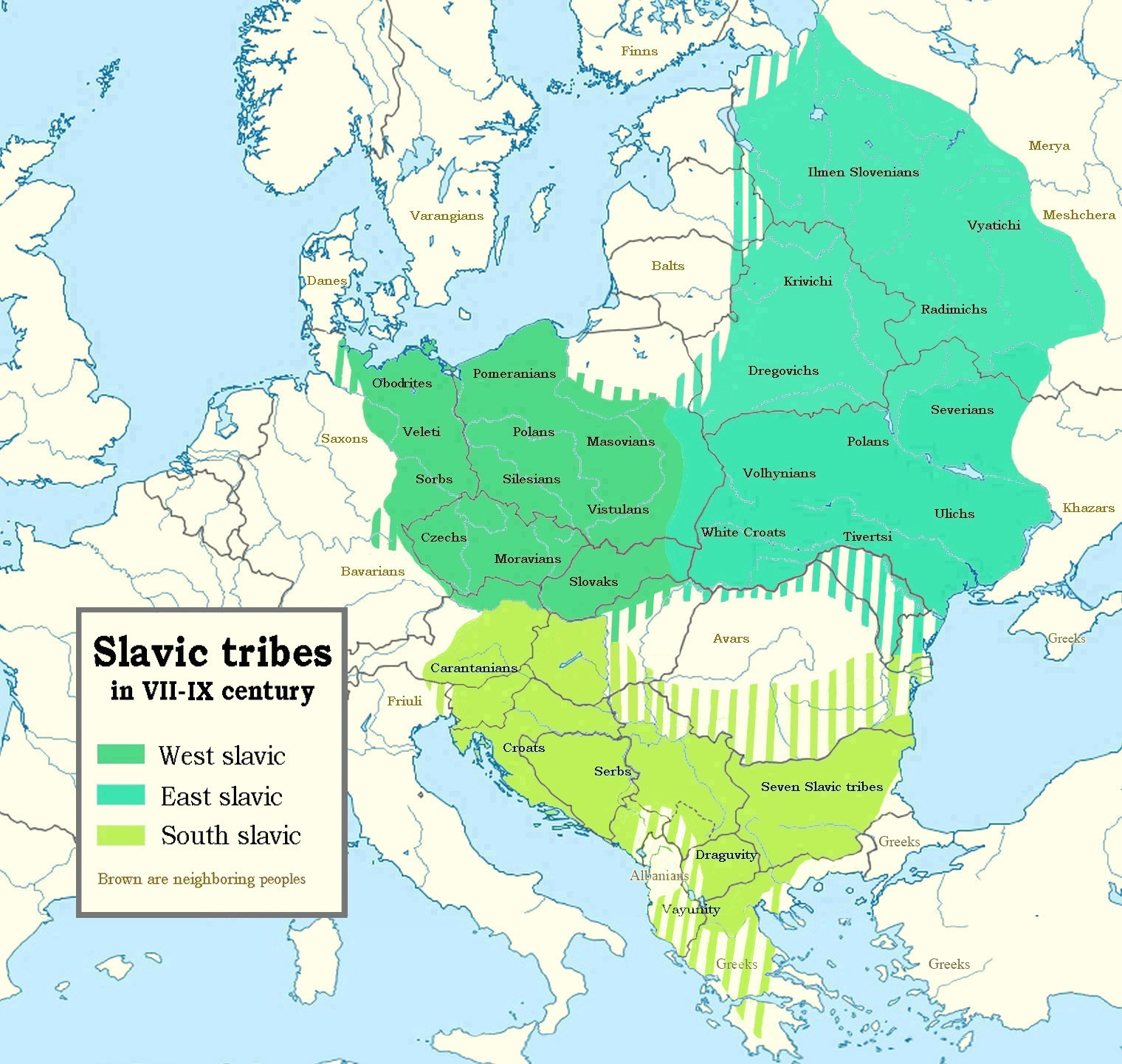
Slavic tribes from the 7th to 9th centuries AD in Europe

The prevailing view on the Slavic settlement of the Eastern Alps is mostly based on evidence from archeological remains (many of which have been discovered due to the extensive highway constructions in post-1991 Slovenia), ethnographic traces (patterns of rural settlement and land cultivation), and the ascertainments of historical linguistics (including toponymy). These views are also confirmed by the relatively few available contemporary mentions and early historical sources (such as Historia Langobardorum by Paulus Diaconus or letters from Pope Gregory I). Another important piece of evidence of Slavic advances is the progressive decline of ancient Christian dioceses in the respective areas. Alpine Slavs, including Carantanians, mainly originate from Slavs of the Prague-Korchak culture. In the 10th century, they were significantly influenced by the Bijelo Brdo culture of the Pannonian Slavs.

== Phases of the settlement ==
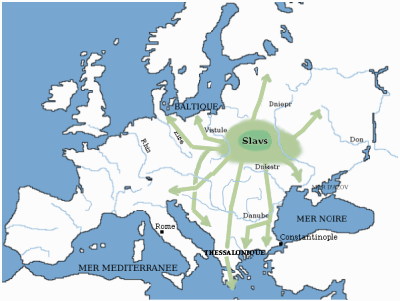
The origin and migration of Slavs in Europe between the 5th and 10th centuries AD: Slavic urheimat within Polesia (modern-day southern Belarus, northern Ukraine, and eastern Poland) Expansion of the Slavic migration in Europe

The first phase of Slavic settlement in the Eastern Alps region dates to around the year 550 and originated in the area of present-day Moravia (i.e., the West Slavic speaking branch). From there, Slavic peoples moved southward into the territory of the former Roman province of Noricum (modern-day Upper and Lower Austria regions). Subsequently, they advanced along the Alpine river valleys towards the Karawanks range and the settlement of Poetovio (modern-day Ptuj), where the decline of the local diocese is documented before 577.

The second phase of Slavic settlement originated from the south and took place after the migration of the Lombards into the Italian peninsula in 568. The Lombards agreed to cede the abandoned territory to their new allies, the Avars, who at the time held sway over the Slavs. The Avars first appeared in Europe around 560, when they reached the lower Danube. In 567, the Avars and Lombards jointly defeated the Gepids. After the migration of the Lombards to Italy in 568, the Avars became the nominal rulers of both the Pannonian plain (which they had conquered by 582) and the neighboring region of the Eastern Alps. The Avars and Slavic advance towards the Eastern Alps can be reconstructed based on synodal documents from the metropolitan church of Aquileia, which attest to the decline of the ancient dioceses (Emona, Celeia, Poetovio, Aguntum, Teurnia, Virunum, Scarabantia) in the area in question. In 588, the Slavs reached the upper reaches of the Sava River, and in 591 they arrived in the region of the upper Drava, where they soon clashed with the Bavarians led by duke Tassilo I. In 592, the Bavarians prevailed, but in 595 the Slavic-Avar army gained victory, thereby consolidating the border between Frankish and Avar territories. Between 599 and 600, the Slavs advanced through Istria and the Karst region towards Italy.

Driven by German colonization of Austria, Slavs settled the entire Karst and the Gail valley between 600 and the 8th century. From there, they penetrated Friuli via the Val Canale and its tributary valleys (Dogna, Val Raccolana, Val Resia), pushing as far as the valleys of rivers Degano, But and Tagliamento. Other areas through which the Slavs penetrated were the valleys of the Isonzo and Vipava rivers, where they arrived in the 8th century. In this area they had already appeared during the Slavic-Avar raids of the early 7th century. Finally there were raids and clashes caused by Slavic bands in the Torre and Natisone river valleys up until 720. An attempt by the Slavs to conquer the Friulian Plain ended with their defeat at the hands of the Lombards at Lauriana in 720. Subsequently, the Patriarchs of Aquileia invited Slavic settlers to repopulate the areas of central and lower Friuli, extending as far as the Livenza river, that had been devastated by Magyar incursions.

Avar rule over the Slavs lasted until the mid-620s. In 623, the Slavs, led by Frankish merchant Samo, rebelled against the Avars. In 626, the Avars were ultimately defeated at Constantinople; subsequently, Samo became the ruler of the first historically known Slavic political entity, Samo's Tribal Union, which survived until his death in 658. Later, around 660, a smaller Slavic principality known as Carantania emerged, which was absorbed by the Frankish Empire in 745.

== Slavs and the original population ==
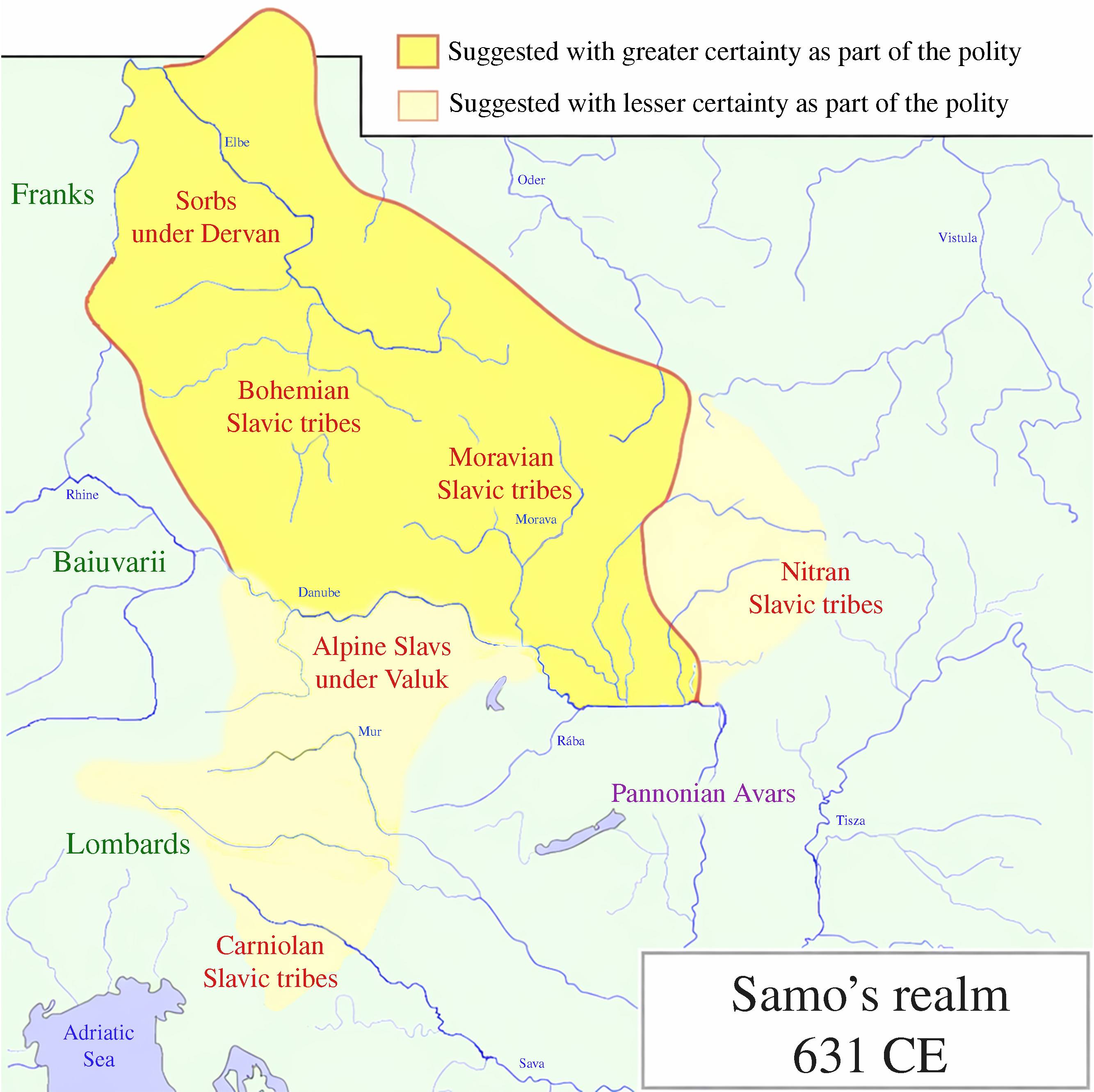
Map approximating the territories in which Slavic tribes are thought to have pledged allegiance to Samo, ruler of a Slavic tribal confederation in the 7th century.

After settling in the Eastern Alps region, Slavs subsequently subjugated and assimilated the Celtic and Illyrian Romanised population, which had dwelt in the territory of the former Noricum and parts of Pannonia province and in their cities. In late Antiquity, the original population evaded Slavic settlers by moving into remote and elevated places, usually hills, where they built fortifications; such examples are Ajdna in the Karawanks mountain ridge and Rifnik near modern-day Celje. However, recent archeological research shows that even certain well-fortified cities in the lower lying areas managed to protect themselves from the invaders. Part of the native population escaped into Italy and to the cities along the Adriatic coast, among them Civitas Nova (modern-day Novigrad).

Slavs referred to the Romanised aborigines as Vlahi or Lahi. Certain place names in modern-day Slovenia, such as Laško, Laški rovt, Lahovče, and others, bear witness to this. Also, a number of river names in modern-day Slovenia, like Sava, Drava, Soča, as well as the geographic name Carniola (Slovenian Kranjska) were adopted from the Romanised aborigines.

== See also ==
- Sclaveni
- Antes
- Paganism in the Eastern Alps
- Obodrites
- Venetic theory
- Eastern Alps

== Sources ==
- G. Barbina, E. Bartolini, G. Bergamini, C. C. Desinan, G. Frau, G. C. Menis, V. Zoratti, Codroipo, Codroipo, Il ponte, 1981
- Rajko Bratož, "Gli inizi dell'etnogenesi slovena : fatti, tesi e ipotesi relativi al periodo di transizione dall'eta antica al medioevo nel territorio situato tra l'Adriatico e il Danubio". In publication: La cristianizzazione degli Slavi nell'arco alpino orientale, ur. Andrea Tilatti. Nuovi studi storici, 69. Roma, Gorizia, 2005, str. 145–188. COBISS 24472109
- G. G. Corbanese, Il Friuli, Trieste e l’Istria: dalla Preistoria alla caduta del Patriarcato d’Aquileia, Grande Atlante Cronologico, Udine, Del Bianco, 1983
- Bogo Grafenauer, "Naselitev Slovanov v Vzhodnih Alpah in vprašanje kontinuitete" [Slavic settlement of the Eastern Alps and the issue of continuity], Arheološki vestnik 21-22 (1970–71), p. 17–32;
- Mitja Guštin, ed., "Zgodnji Slovani: zgodnjesrednjeveška lončenina na obrobju vzhodnih Alp = Die frühen Slawen: frühmittelalterliche Keramik am Rand der Ostalpen". Ljubljana, 2002. COBISS 3411552
- Hans-Dietrich Kahl, "Der Staat der Karantanen: Fakten, Thesen und Fragen zu einer frühen slawischen Machtbildung im Ostalpenraum". Ljubljana, 2002. COBISS 3568736
- Luthar, Oto, ed. (2008). The Land Between: A History of Slovenia. Frankfurt am Main: Peter Lang.
- Sedov, Valentin Vasilyevich (2013) [1995]. "Alpski Slaveni" [Alpine Slavs]. Славяне в раннем Средневековье [Sloveni u ranom srednjem veku (Slavs in Early Middle Ages)]. Novi Sad: Akademska knjiga. pp. 382–393. ISBN 978-86-6263-026-1.
- Peter Štih, "Ob naselitvi Slovanov vse pobito?" [Did Slavic settlement result in the killing of the entire population?]. In publication: Množične smrti na Slovenskem: 29. zborovanje slovenskih zgodovinarjev [Massive killings in Slovenia: 29th conference of Slovenian historians], Ljubljana, 1999, p. 79–93. COBISS 10024290
- Peter Štih, Janez Peršič, "Problem langobardske vzhodne meje" [The issue of the Lombard eastern frontier], Zgodovinski časopis = Historical Review 35 (1981), p. 333–341. COBISS 14735714
- Aleš Žužek, "Naselitev Slovanov v vzhodnoalpski prostor" [Slavic settlement of the Eastern Alps area], Zgodovinski časopis = Historical Review 61 (2007), p. 261–287.
