= Sebenje, Bled =

Sebenje
- Location in Slovenia
- Coordinates: 46°23′14″N 14°06′02″E
- Country: Slovenia
- Traditional Region: Upper Carniola
- Statistical region: Upper Carniola
- Municipality: Bled
- Elevation: 542 m (1,778 ft)

Sebenje (pronounced [sɛˈbeːnjɛʃ], German: Sebeine) is a former settlement in the Municipality of Bled in northwestern Slovenia. It is now part of the village of Zasip. The area is part of the traditional region of Upper Carniola and is now included with the rest of the municipality in the Upper Carniola Statistical Region.

== Geography ==
Sebenje lies in the western part of Zasip, along the road to Podhom and Spodnje Gorje.

== History ==
Sebenje had a population of 14 living in 3 houses in 1880 and 24 living in 6 houses in 1900. Sebenje was annexed by Zasip in 1952, ending its existence as a separate settlement.

== Church ==
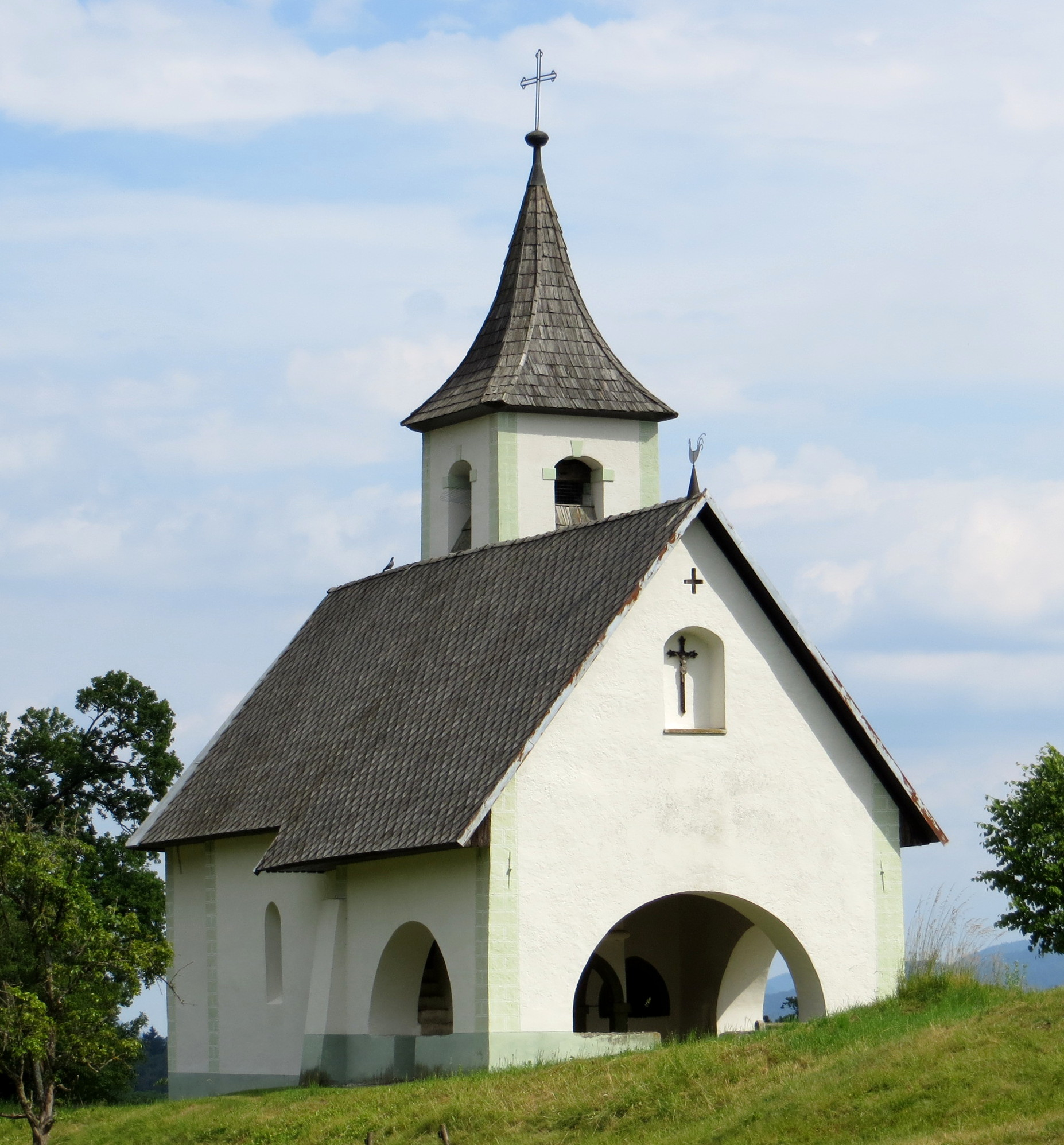
Holy Trinity Church

The church in Sebenje is dedicated to the Holy Trinity and was built between 1606 and 1608. It has a vaulted rectangular nave, a chancel walled on three sides, a portico, and a bell tower. The church's furnishings are in the Renaissance style.
