= Ribno =

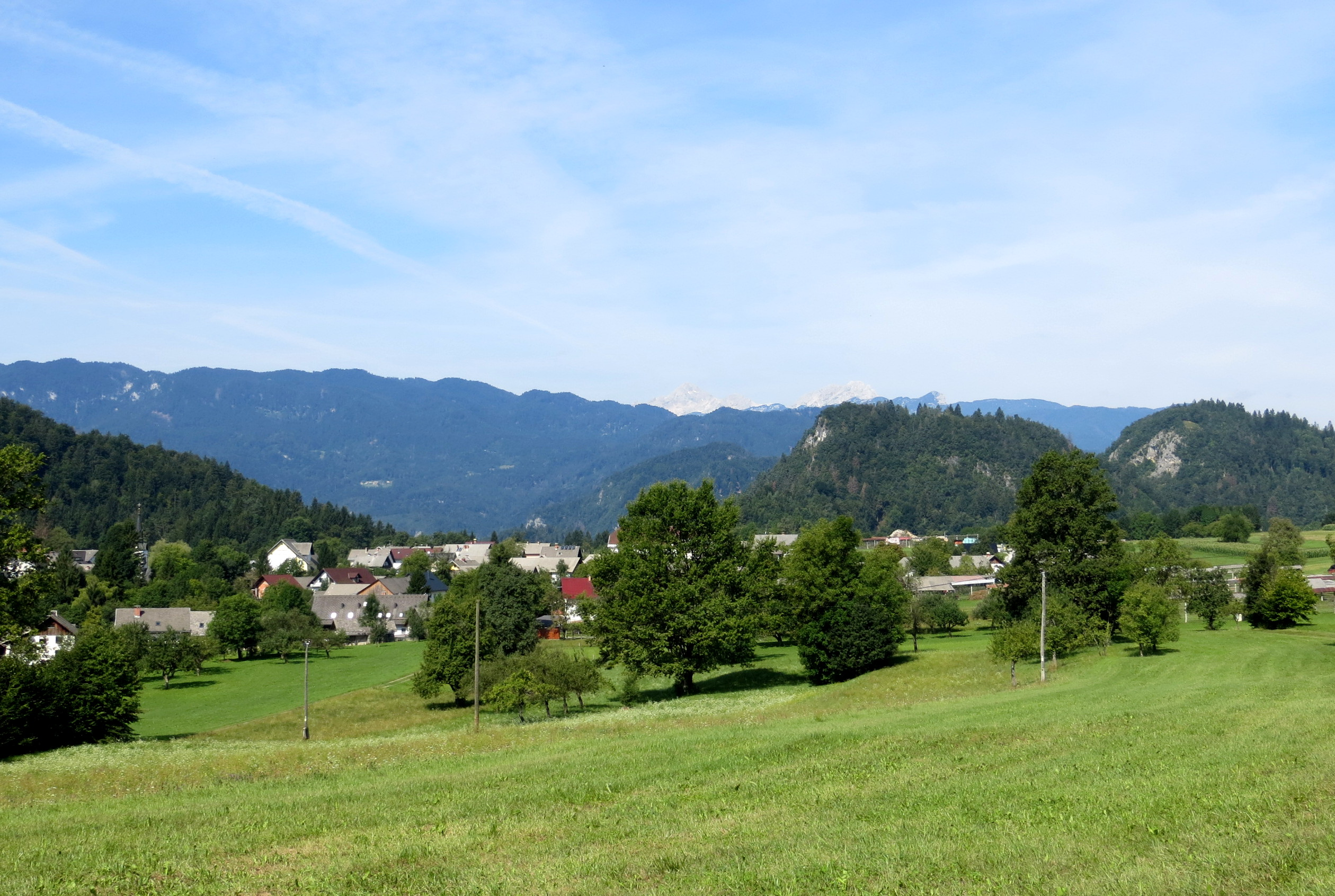

- Location in Slovenia
- Coordinates: 46°21′4.79″N 14°7′24.53″E
- Country: Slovenia
- Traditional Region: Upper Carniola
- Statistical region: Upper Carniola
- Municipality: Bled
- Elevation: 568.5 m (1,865 ft)

Population (2020)
  - Total: 612

Ribno (pronounced [ˈɾiːbnɔ]) is a settlement in the Municipality of Bled in the Upper Carniola region of Slovenia.

== Geography ==
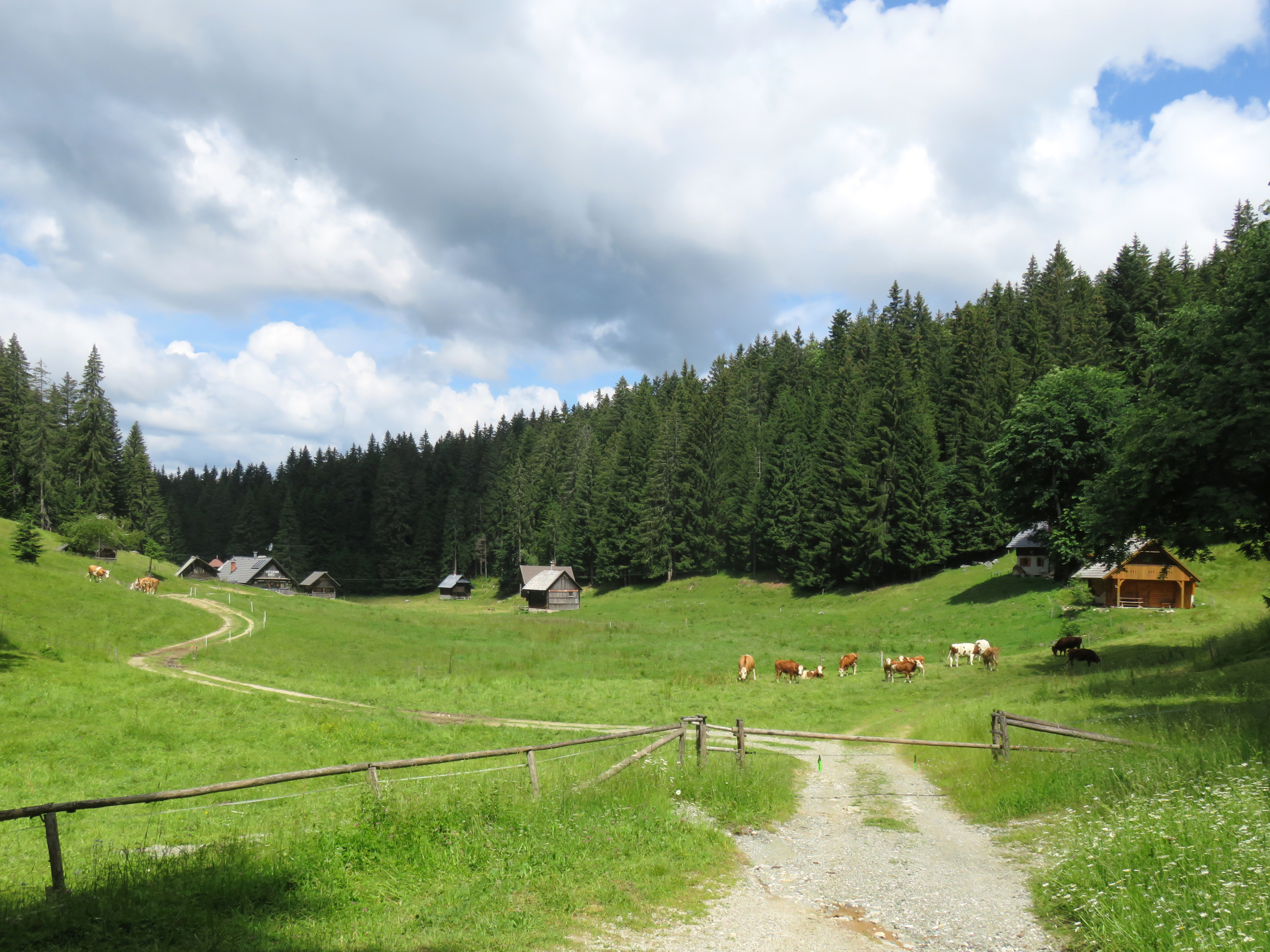
The Selca Pasture

The territory of Ribno extends from the village center north of the Sava Bohinjka River to the south. Its elevation ranges from a low of 417 meters (1,368 ft) along the river to a high of 1,265 meters (4,150 ft) at Black Peak (Slovene: Črni vrh) on the Jelovica Plateau. The Selca Pasture (Slovene: Selška planina or Selska planina), also known as the Selca–Kupljenik Pasture (Slovene: Selsko-kupljeniška planina), lies at the southernmost point in the settlement, below the southern slope of Black Peak.

== Church ==
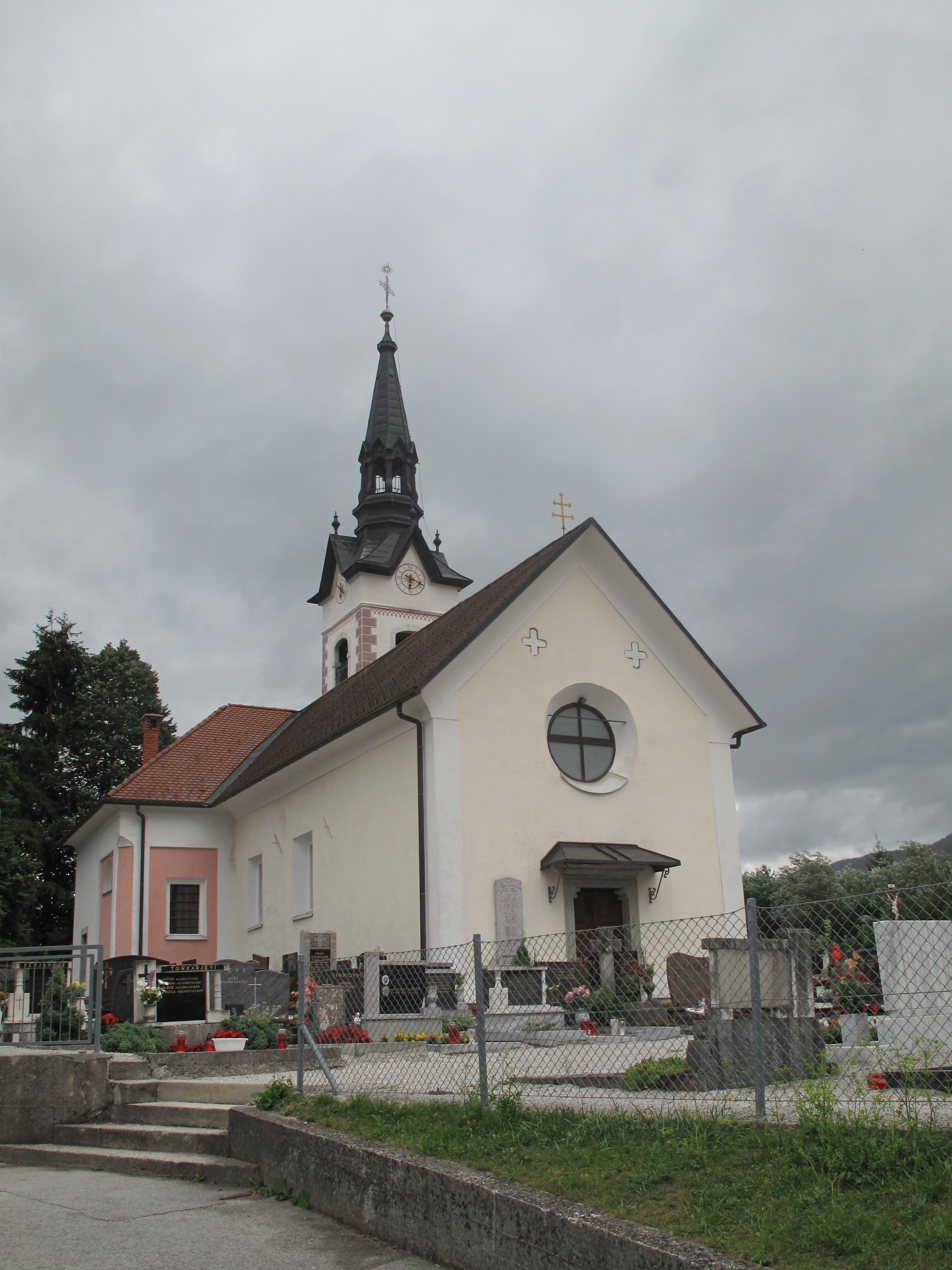
Saint James's Church

The parish church in the village is dedicated to Saint James. It was originally a Gothic church with some frescos remaining in the chancel, but it was greatly rebuilt and reconstructed in the late 19th century.
