= Koroška Vas, Novo Mesto =

Koroška Vas
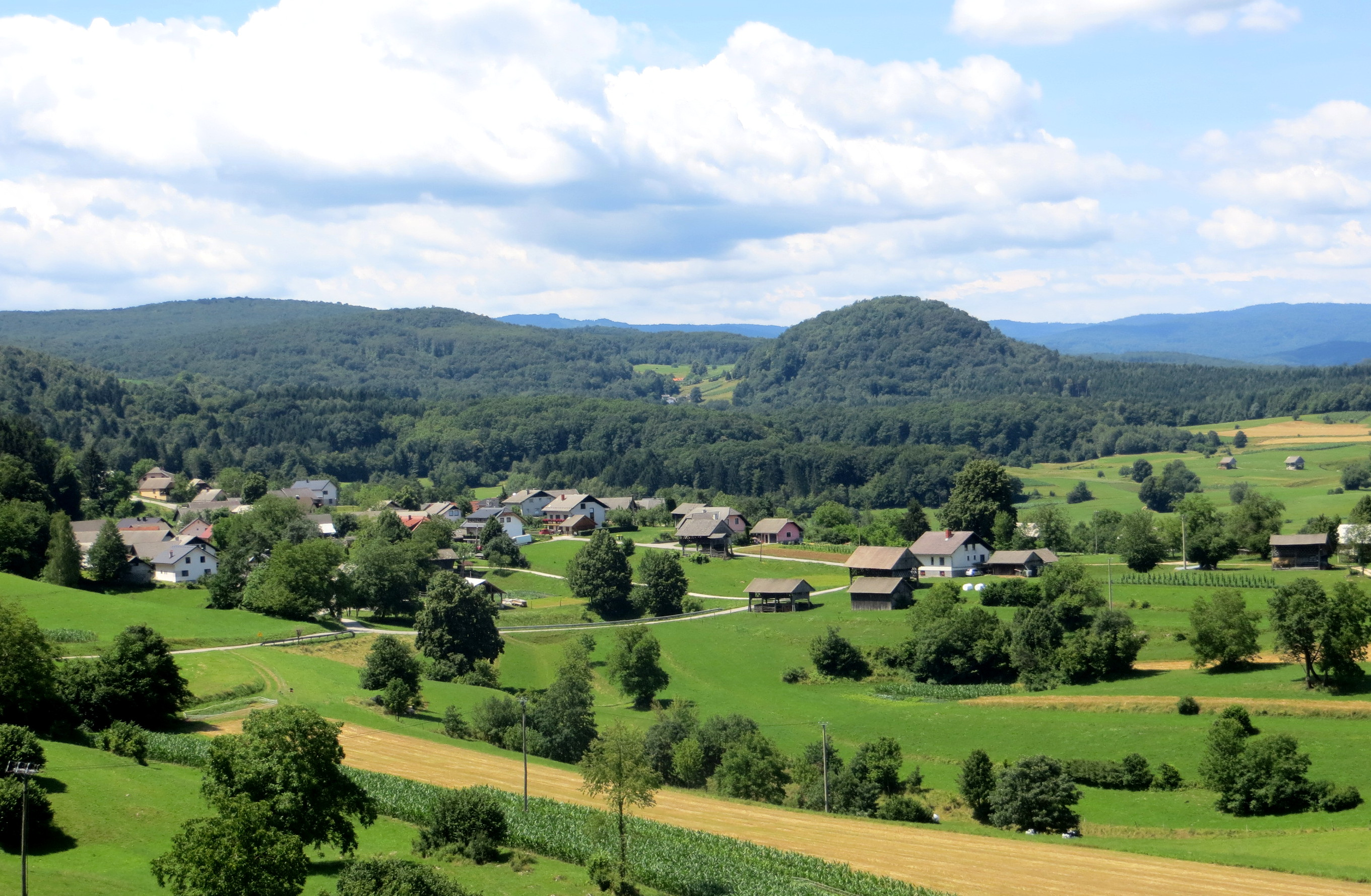

- Location in Slovenia
- Coordinates: 45°44′45.26″N 15°11′41.83″E
- Country: Slovenia
- Traditional region: Lower Carniola
- Statistical region: Southeast Slovenia
- Municipality: Novo Mesto

Area
  - Total: 2.888 km^{2} (1.115 sq mi)
- Elevation: 281.6 m (924 ft)

Population (2026)
  - Total: 254
  - Density: 88/km^{2} (230/sq mi)
- Postal code: 8000

Koroška Vas (pronounced [kɔˈɾóːʃka ˈʋáːs]; Slovene: Koroška vas) is a settlement in the hills south of Novo Mesto in southeastern Slovenia. The area is part of the traditional region of Lower Carniola and is now included in the Southeast Slovenia Statistical Region. In January 2026, the population was 254.

== Name ==
The name Koroška vas literally means 'Carinthian village'. It was attested in written sources in 1485 as Koroschndorf vnder Meichaw. The name refers to a settlement that was colonized by arrivals from Carinthia in the Middle Ages. See also Koroška Vas na Pohorju and Koroška Bela for similar names outside Carinthia.
