= Obrne =

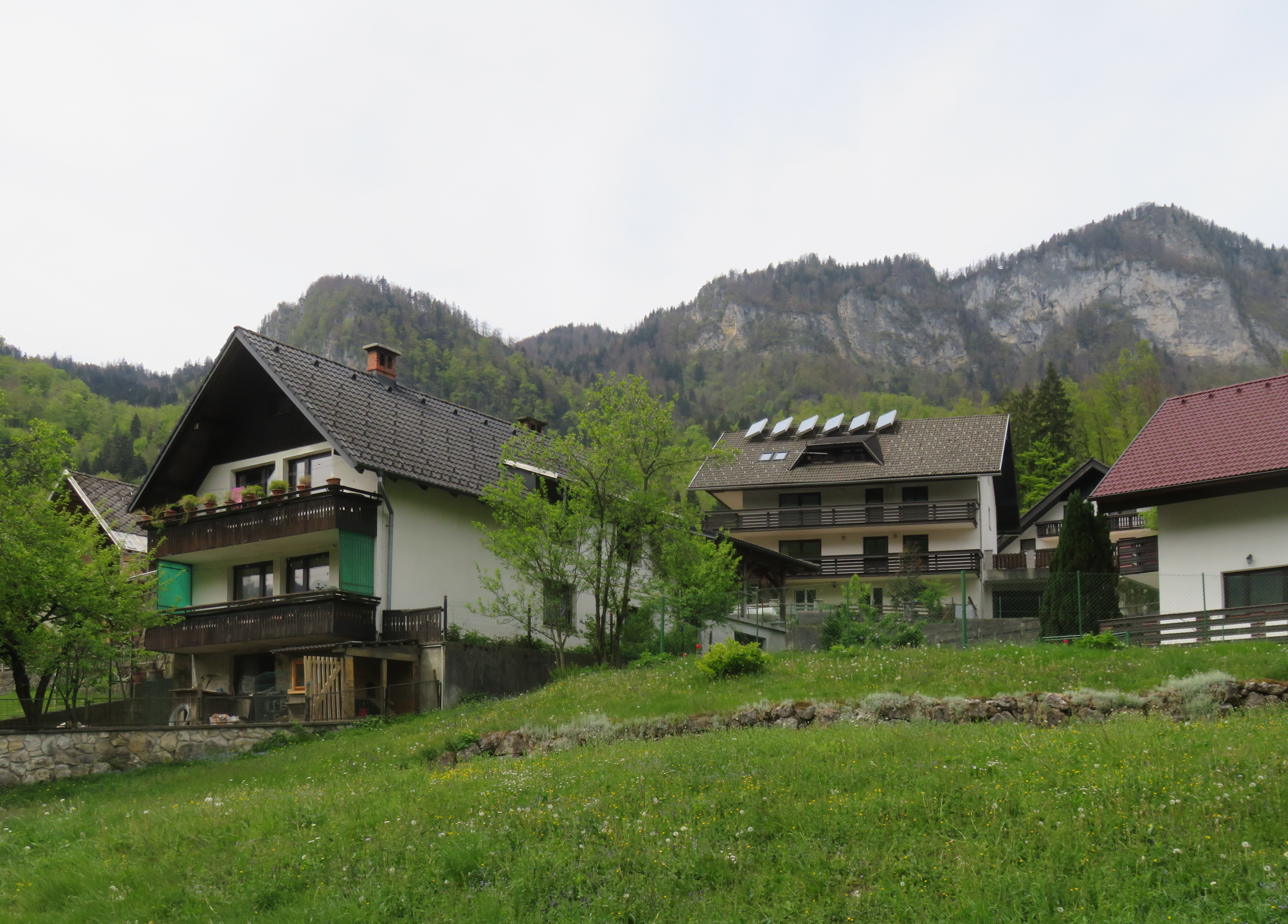

- Location in Slovenia
- Coordinates: 46°19′40.33″N 14°3′29.29″E
- Country: Slovenia
- Traditional Region: Upper Carniola
- Statistical region: Upper Carniola
- Municipality: Bled
- Elevation: 511.2 m (1,677 ft)

Population (2020)
  - Total: 66

Obrne (pronounced [ˈoːbəɾnɛ]) is a settlement in the Municipality of Bled in the Upper Carniola region of Slovenia.

== Name ==
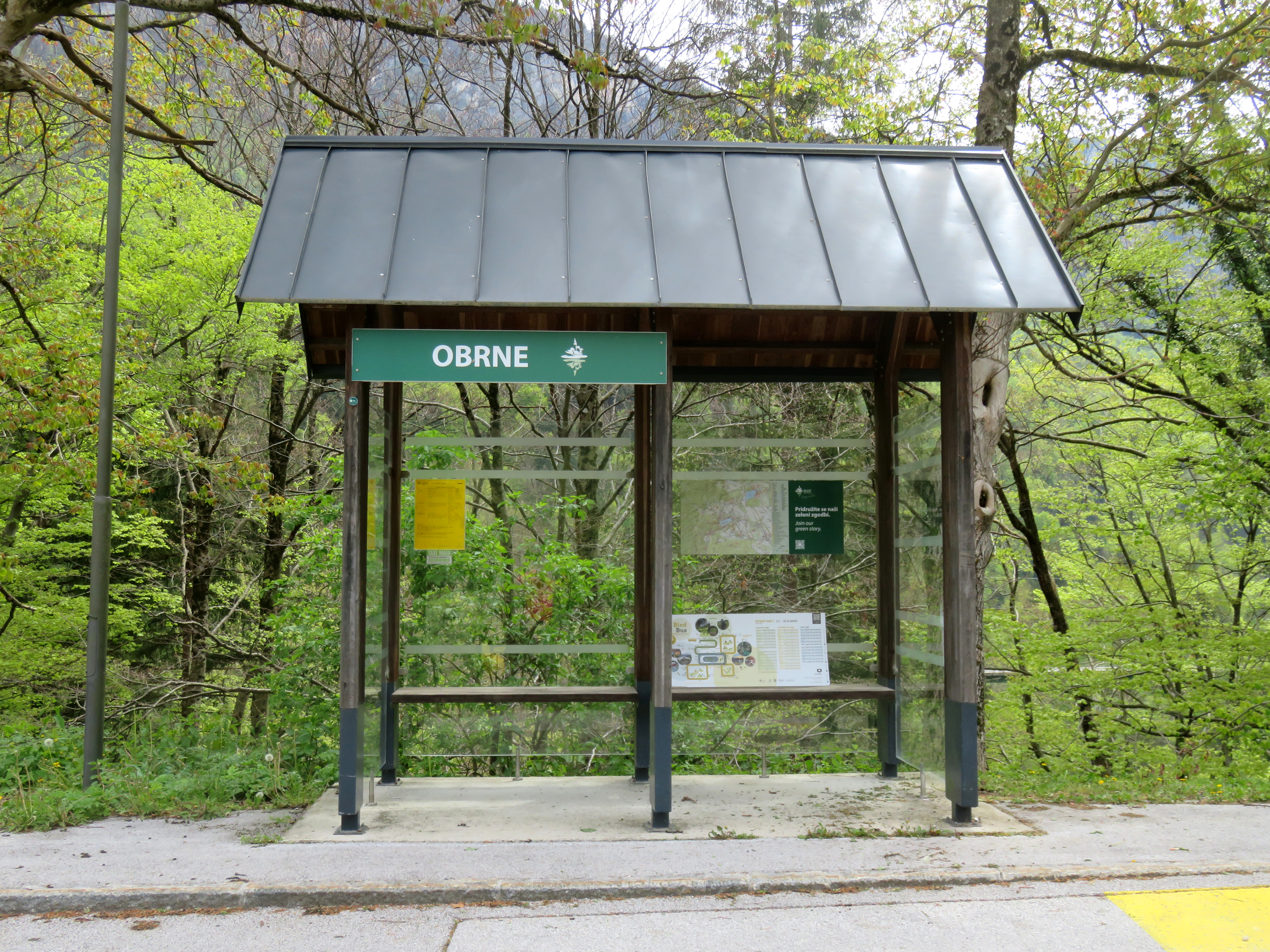
Bus stop labeled for Obrne

Obrne was attested in historical sources as Obernach between 1493 and 1501. The name is believed to derive from the form *ob-vorьn-jane, sharing the same root as the common noun obora 'fenced pasture; enclosed reserve for game'.
