= Koroška Vas na Pohorju =

Koroška Vas na Pohorju Koroška Vas (until 1998)
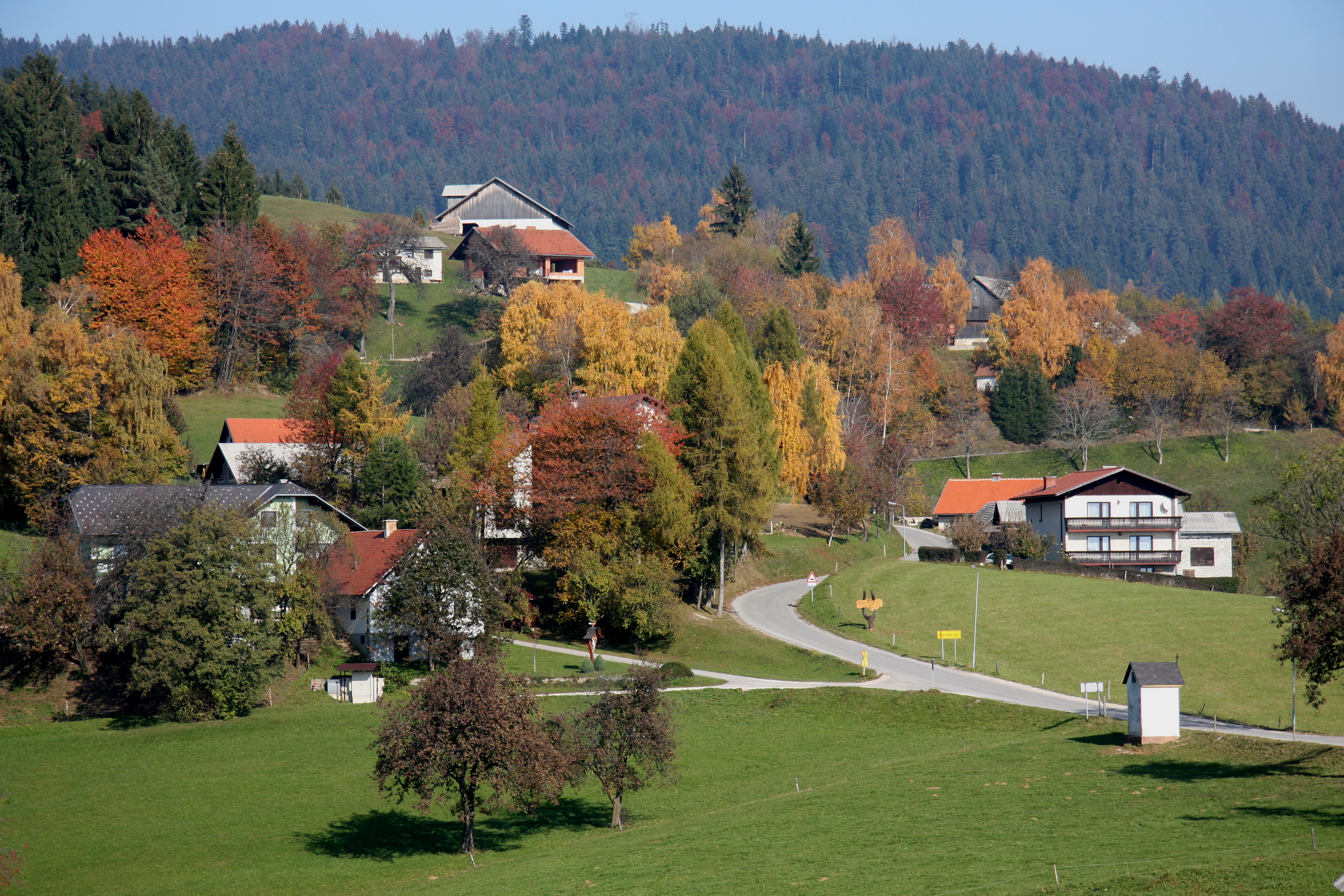

- Location in Slovenia
- Coordinates: 46°24′24.79″N 15°23′46.26″E
- Country: Slovenia
- Traditional region: Styria
- Statistical region: Savinja
- Municipality: Zreče

Area
  - Total: 2.17 km^{2} (0.84 sq mi)
- Elevation: 786.2 m (2,579 ft)

Population (2002)
  - Total: 113
- Climate: Dfb

Koroška Vas na Pohorju (pronounced [kɔˈɾóːʃka ˈʋáːs na ˈpóːxɔɾju]; Slovene: Koroška vas na Pohorju) is a settlement in the foothills of the Pohorje range in the Municipality of Zreče in northeastern Slovenia. It is part of the traditional region of Styria and is now included with the rest of the municipality in the Savinja Statistical Region.

== Name ==
The name Koroška vas na Pohorju literally means 'Carinthian village in Pohorje'. The name refers to a settlement that was colonized by arrivals from Carinthia in the Middle Ages. Until 1998, the name was simply Koroška vas. See also Koroška Vas and Koroška Bela for similar names outside Carinthia.
