= Selo pri Bledu =

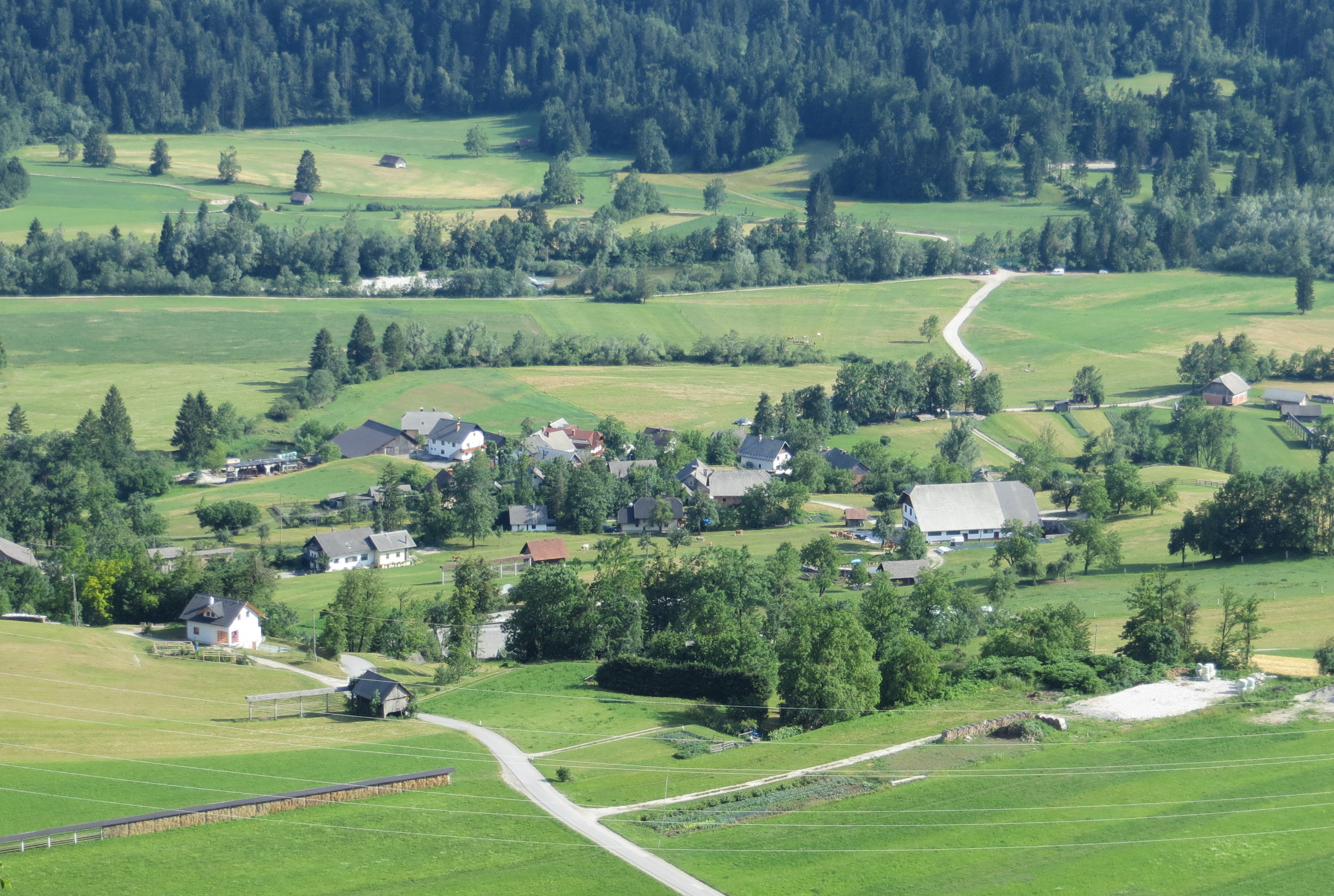

- Location in Slovenia
- Coordinates: 46°21′7.95″N 14°6′32.56″E
- Country: Slovenia
- Traditional Region: Upper Carniola
- Statistical region: Upper Carniola
- Municipality: Bled
- Elevation: 454.7 m (1,492 ft)

Population (2020)
  - Total: 205

Selo pri Bledu (pronounced [ˈsɛːlɔ pɾi ˈbleːdu]) is a settlement in the Municipality of Bled in the Upper Carniola region of Slovenia.

== Name ==
The name of the settlement was changed from Selo to Selo pri Bledu in 1953.
