= Zasip =

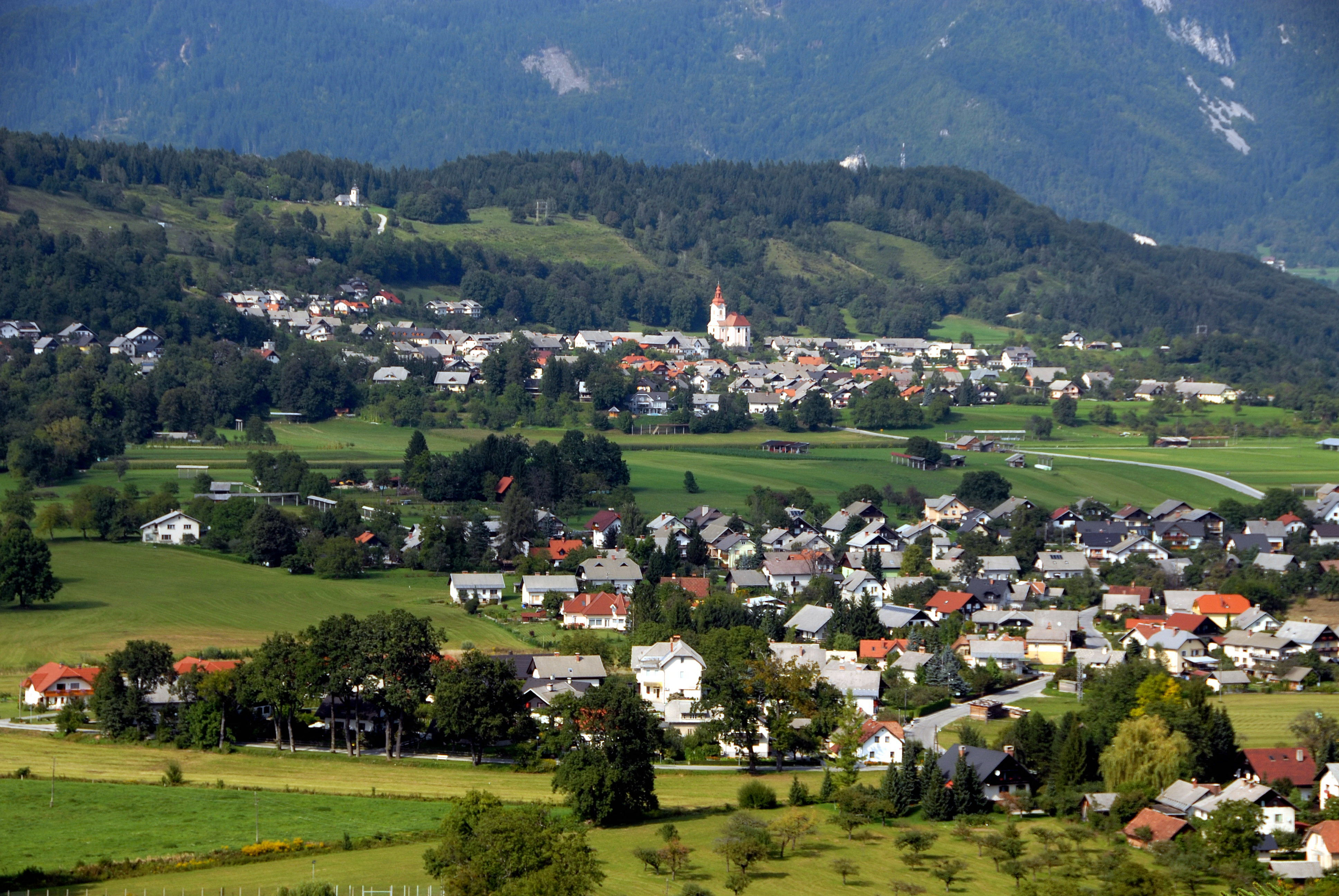

- Location in Slovenia
- Coordinates: 46°23′26.41″N 14°6′26.71″E
- Country: Slovenia
- Traditional Region: Upper Carniola
- Statistical region: Upper Carniola
- Municipality: Bled
- Elevation: 556.4 m (1,825 ft)

Population (2020)
  - Total: 1,019

Zasip (pronounced [ˈzaːsip]; German: Asp) is a village in the Municipality of Bled in the Upper Carniola region of northwestern Slovenia.

== Name ==
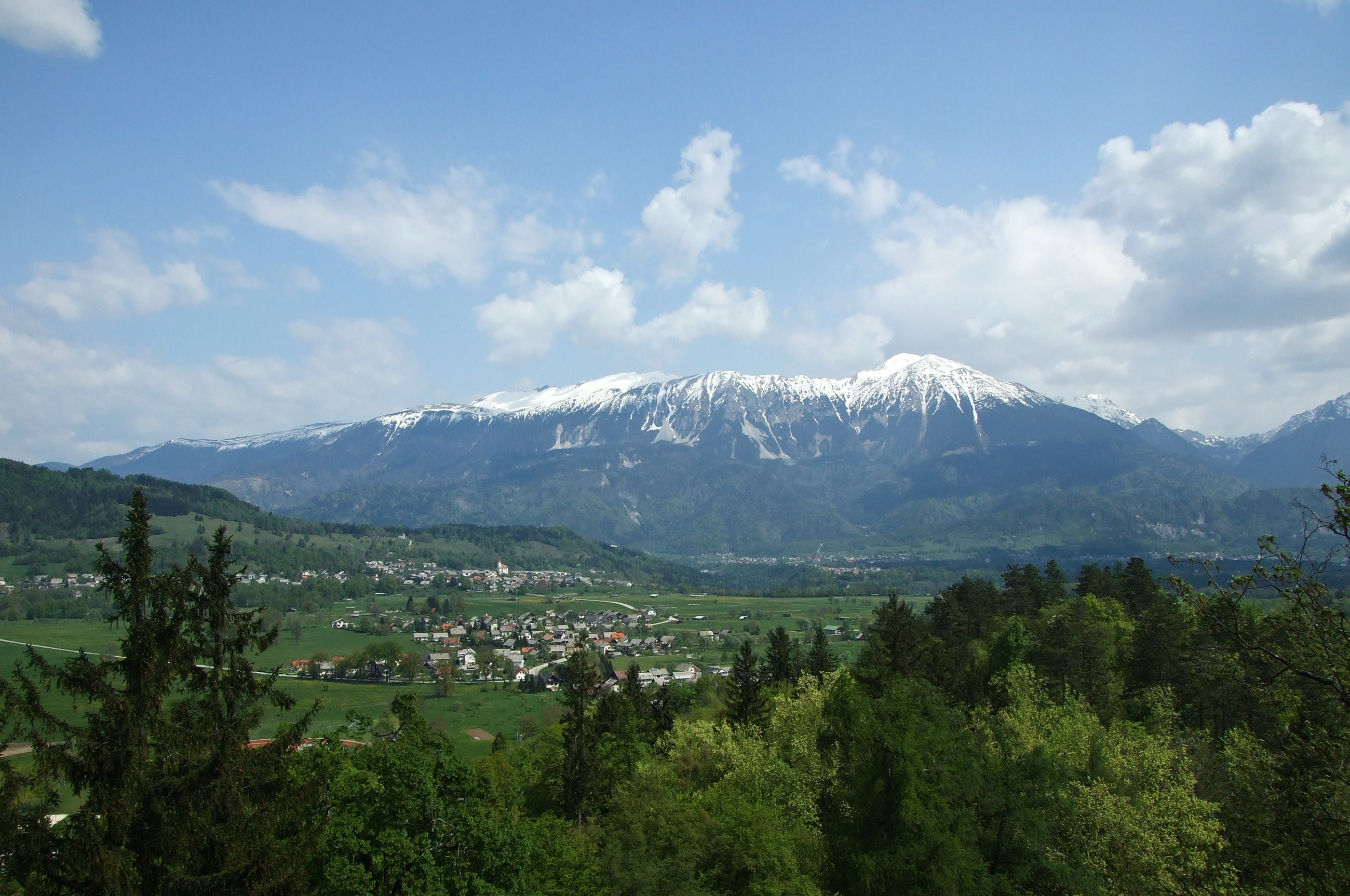
View from Bled over Zasip and the Sava Dolinka valley to the Stol massif

Zasip was attested in written sources in 1075–90 as Zazib. The name is derived from the prepositional phrase *za sipi 'behind the upper part of a scree slope', thus referring to the local geographical feature. In the local dialect, the settlement is known as Zâsp.

== Geography ==
The village is located about 2 km (1.2 mi) north of the Bled town centre and Lake Bled, below the southern slopes of Hom Hill.

== History ==
When the settlement was first mentioned in a 1075 deed, the area belonged to the Imperial March of Carniola. A parish was founded here in 1296.

Today, there are three churches in the village. The parish church is dedicated to Saint John the Baptist was already mentioned in the 13th century. It was originally a Gothic building, although it was renovated to a large extent in the Baroque style in 1778. A small church dedicated to Saint Catherine stands on Hom Hill above the village. It is an old pilgrimage church, dating from around 1400 with some early 16th-century additions and 18th-century renovations. A third church dedicated to the Holy Trinity stands in the hamlet of Sebenje. It is a late-Gothic building with Baroque ornamentation.

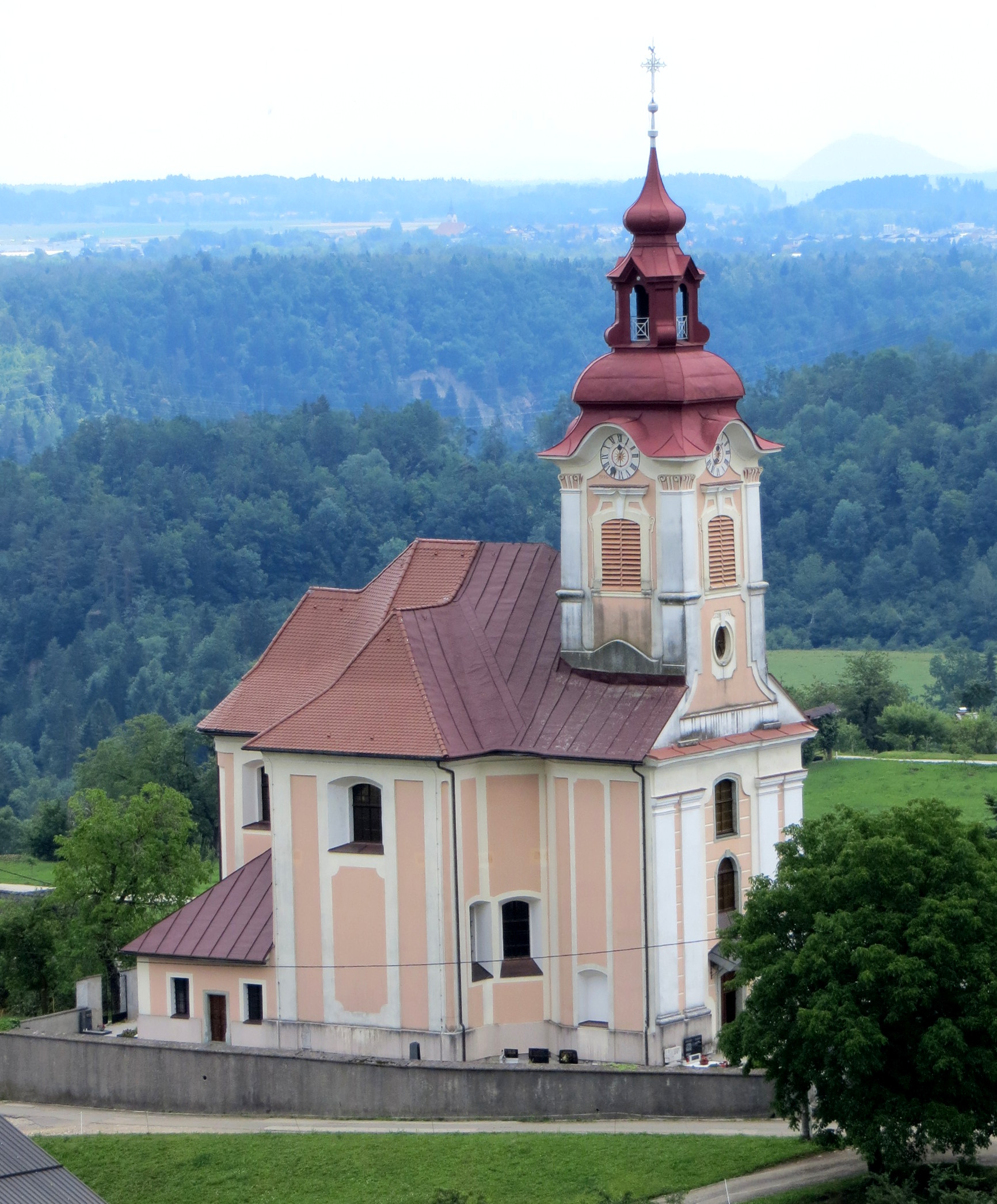
Saint John the Baptist Church

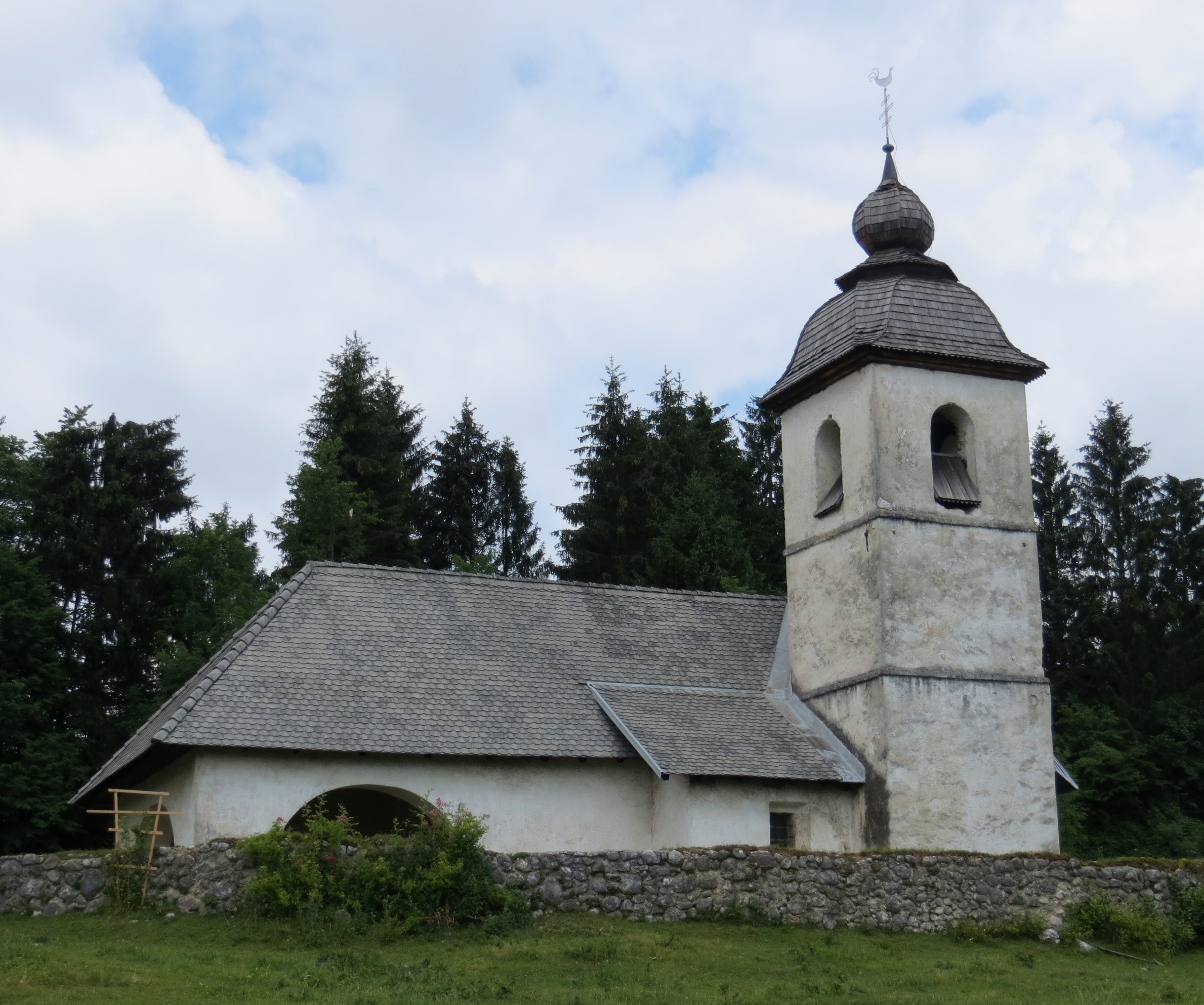
Saint Catherine's Church

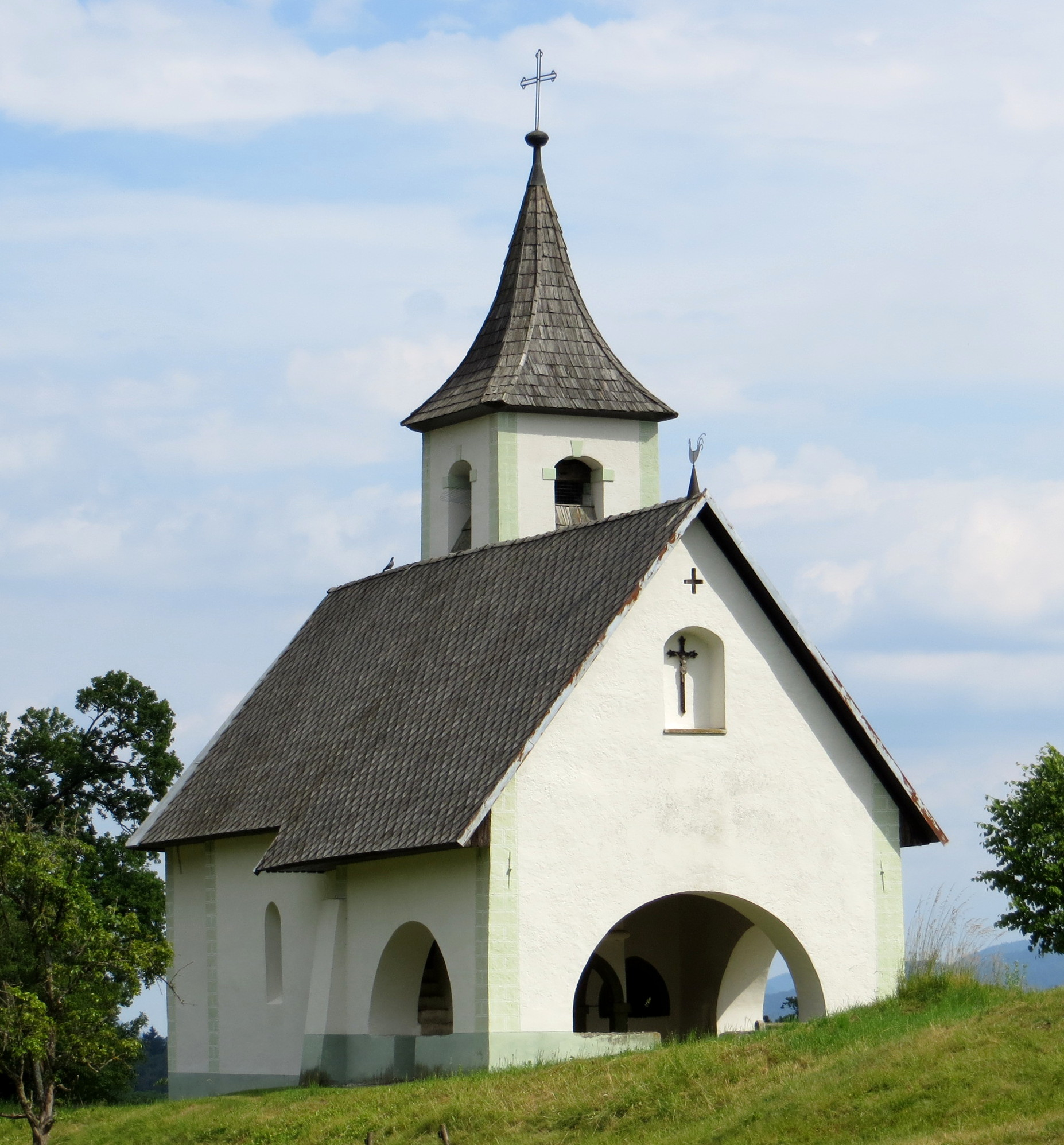
Holy Trinity Church
