= Bodešče =

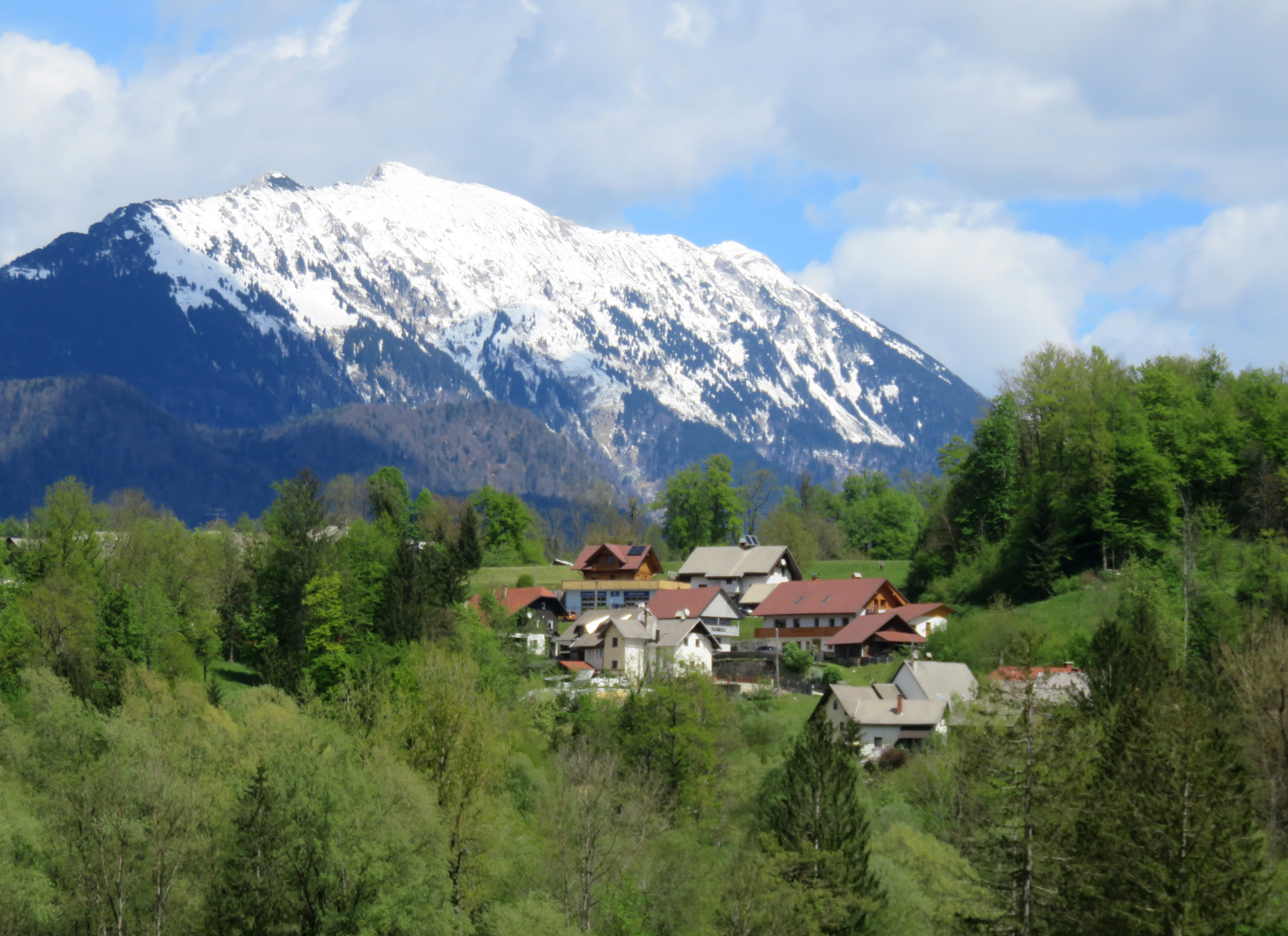

- Location in Slovenia
- Coordinates: 46°20′57.66″N 14°8′6.27″E
- Country: Slovenia
- Traditional Region: Upper Carniola
- Statistical region: Upper Carniola
- Municipality: Bled
- Elevation: 481.5 m (1,580 ft)

Population (2025)
  - Total: 160

Bodešče (pronounced [bɔˈdɛːʃtʃɛ]) is a village on the left bank of the Sava Bohinjka River in the Municipality of Bled in the Upper Carniola region of Slovenia.

== Name ==
Bodešče was attested in written sources as Podesich in 1185, Fodesich in 1253, Vodaschize in 1287, and Bodoschichk in 1368, among other spellings.

== Church ==
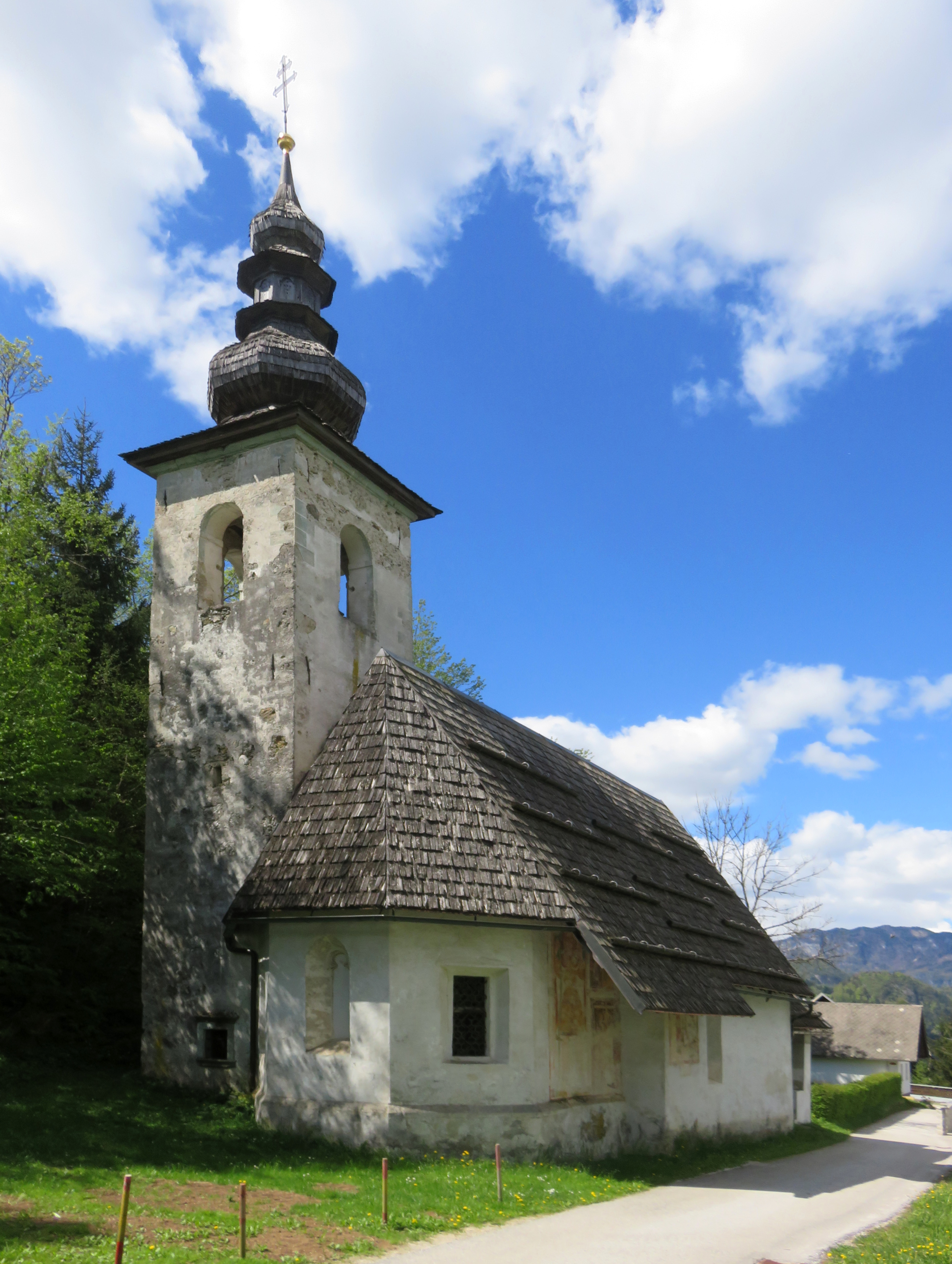
Saint Leonard's Church

The village church is dedicated to Saint Leonard and was allegedly built on the site of an ancient fort. The church has a covered porch, a square nave, and a narrow Gothic star-vaulted presbytery, dating to the mid-15th century. The church tower has an onion-shaped Baroque wooden crown.
