= Koritno, Bled =

Koritno
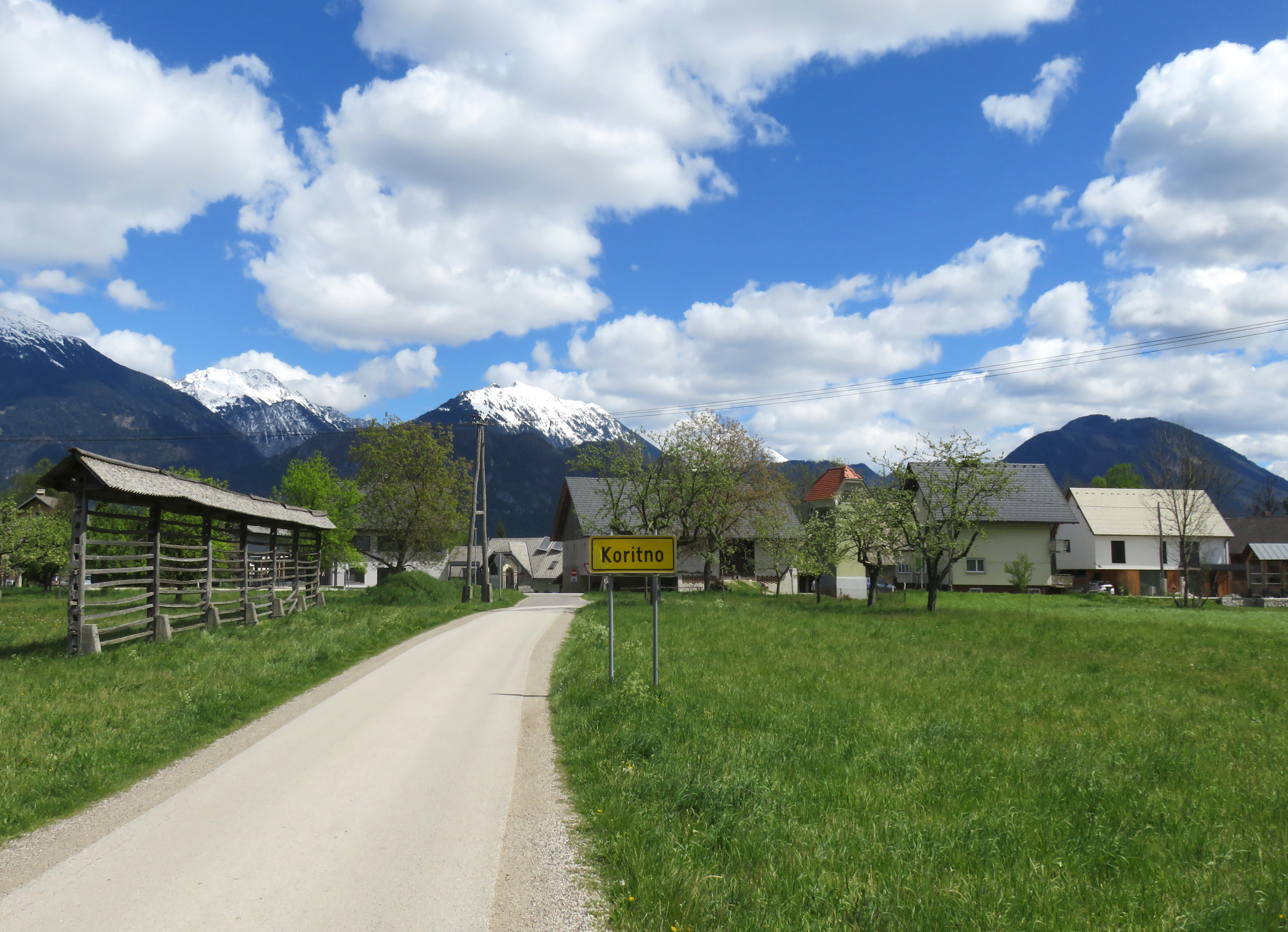

- Location in Slovenia
- Coordinates: 46°21′33.87″N 14°7′57.28″E
- Country: Slovenia
- Traditional Region: Upper Carniola
- Statistical region: Upper Carniola
- Municipality: Bled
- Elevation: 487.8 m (1,600 ft)

Population (2020)
  - Total: 210

Koritno (pronounced [kɔˈɾiːtnɔ]) is a settlement in the Municipality of Bled in the Upper Carniola region of Slovenia.

== Name ==
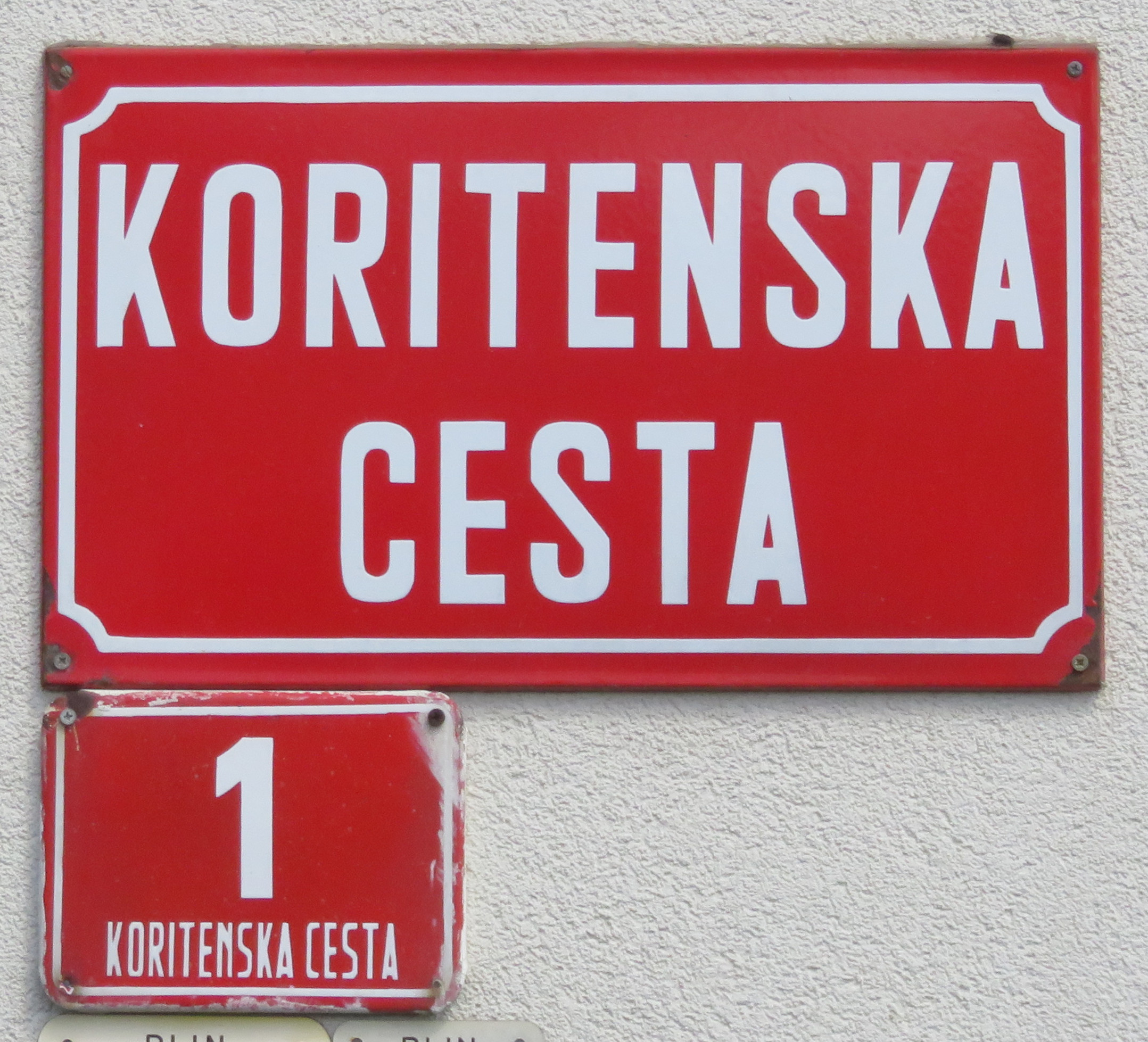
Sign for Koritenska cesta (Koritno Street) in Bled

Koritno was attested in written sources circa 1065 as Corithna, circa 1075 as Coritno, in 1287 as Goriten, and in 1431 as Kareitten. The name is truncated from *Koritno selo, with an adjective derived from korito 'trough; riverbed, channel', referring to a landscape feature, plus selo 'village'. The Slavic root *kory̋to is a frequent basis for place names, such as Korita, Coritis (in Italy's Resia Valley), Korito (in North Macedonia), and Korytná (in the Czech Republic).
