= Bohinjska Bela =

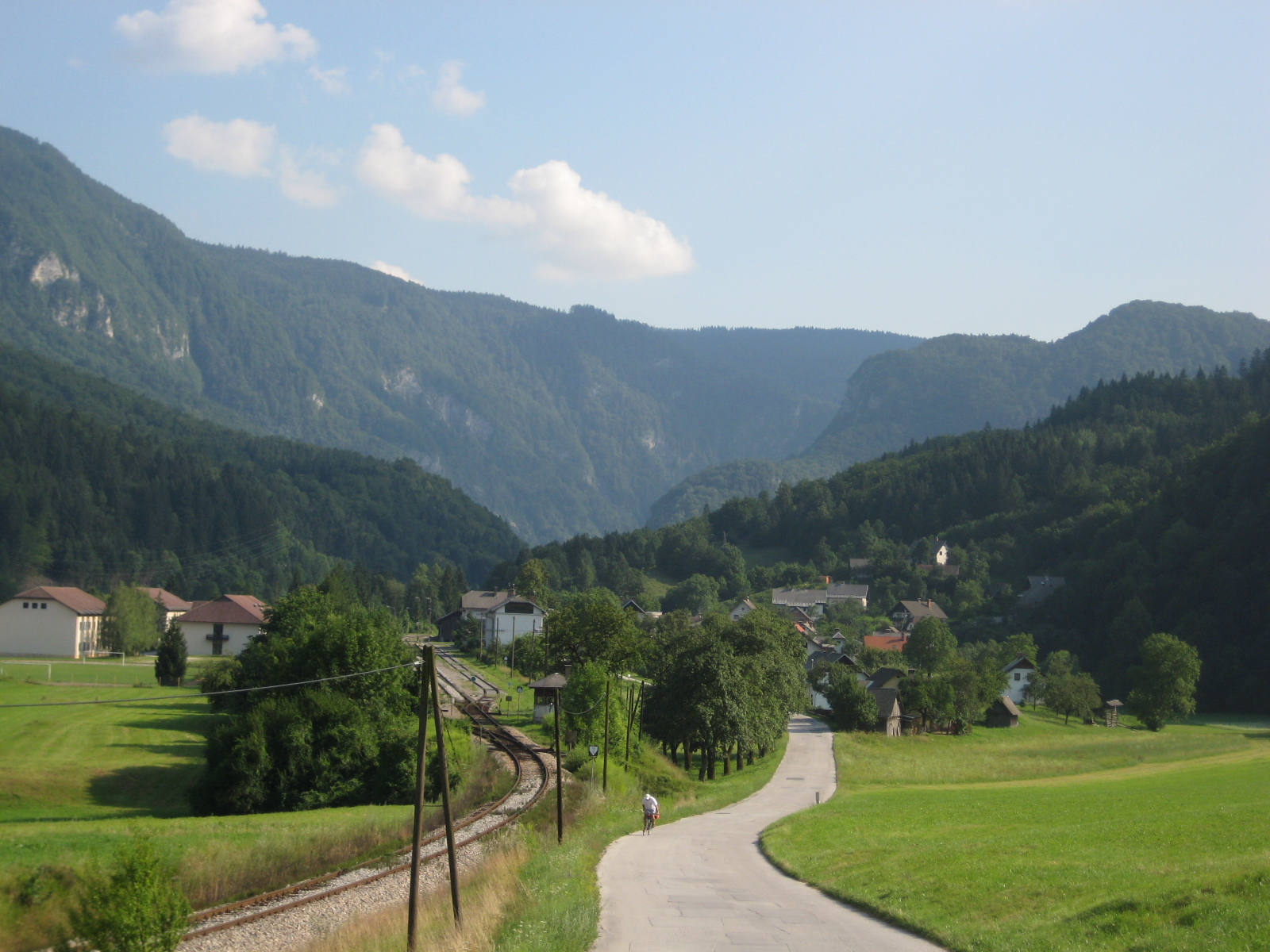

- Location in Slovenia
- Coordinates: 46°20′23.87″N 14°3′45.85″E
- Country: Slovenia
- Traditional Region: Upper Carniola
- Statistical region: Upper Carniola
- Municipality: Bled
- Elevation: 477.8 m (1,568 ft)

Population (2025)
  - Total: 593

Bohinjska Bela (pronounced [bɔˈxiːnska ˈbeːla], German: Wocheiner Vellach) is a village in the Municipality of Bled in the Upper Carniola region of Slovenia.

== Geography ==
Bohinjska Bela lies on the left bank of the Sava Bohinjka River, southwest of Bled. The oldest part of the settlement, locally known as Spodnja vas or Dolenja vas ('lower village'), is believed to be over a thousand years old. The main part of the village is known as Zgornja vas or Gorenja vas ('upper village'). The train and bus stations are in the smallest part of the village, known locally as Podklanec. The Bohinjska Bela Barracks (with the Slovenian Military Mountain School and Multinational Centre of Excellence for Mountain Warfare) is located here.

== Name ==
Bohinjska Bela was attested in written sources as Velach in 1253 and Vocheiner Velach in 1368, among other spellings.

== Church ==
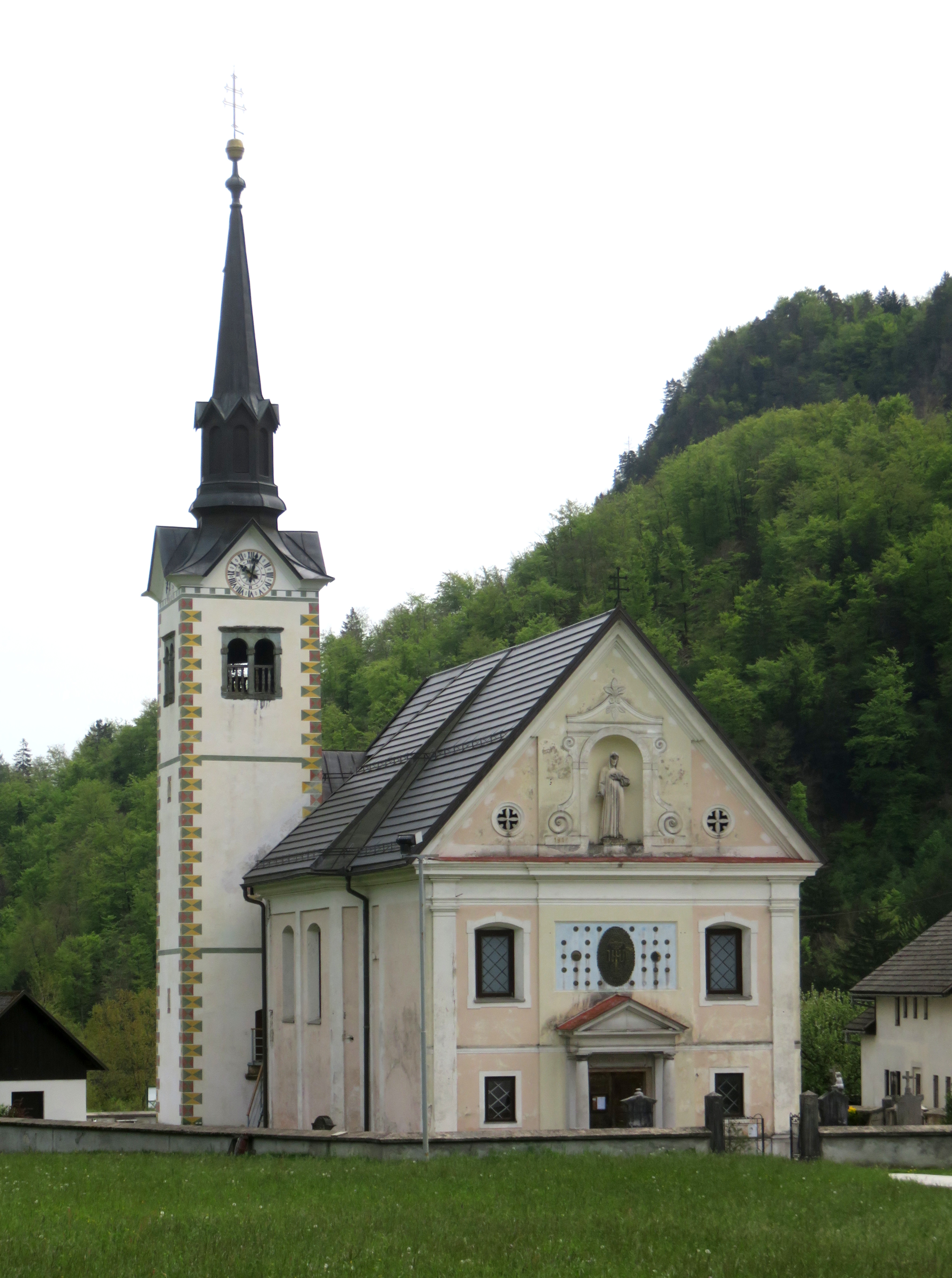
St. Margaret's Church in Bohinjska Bela

Saint Margaret's Church, dating from the 16th century, stands in the part of the settlement known as Spodnja vas.
