= Municipality of Bled =

Municipality of Slovenia

Municipality of Bled Občina Bled
- Municipality
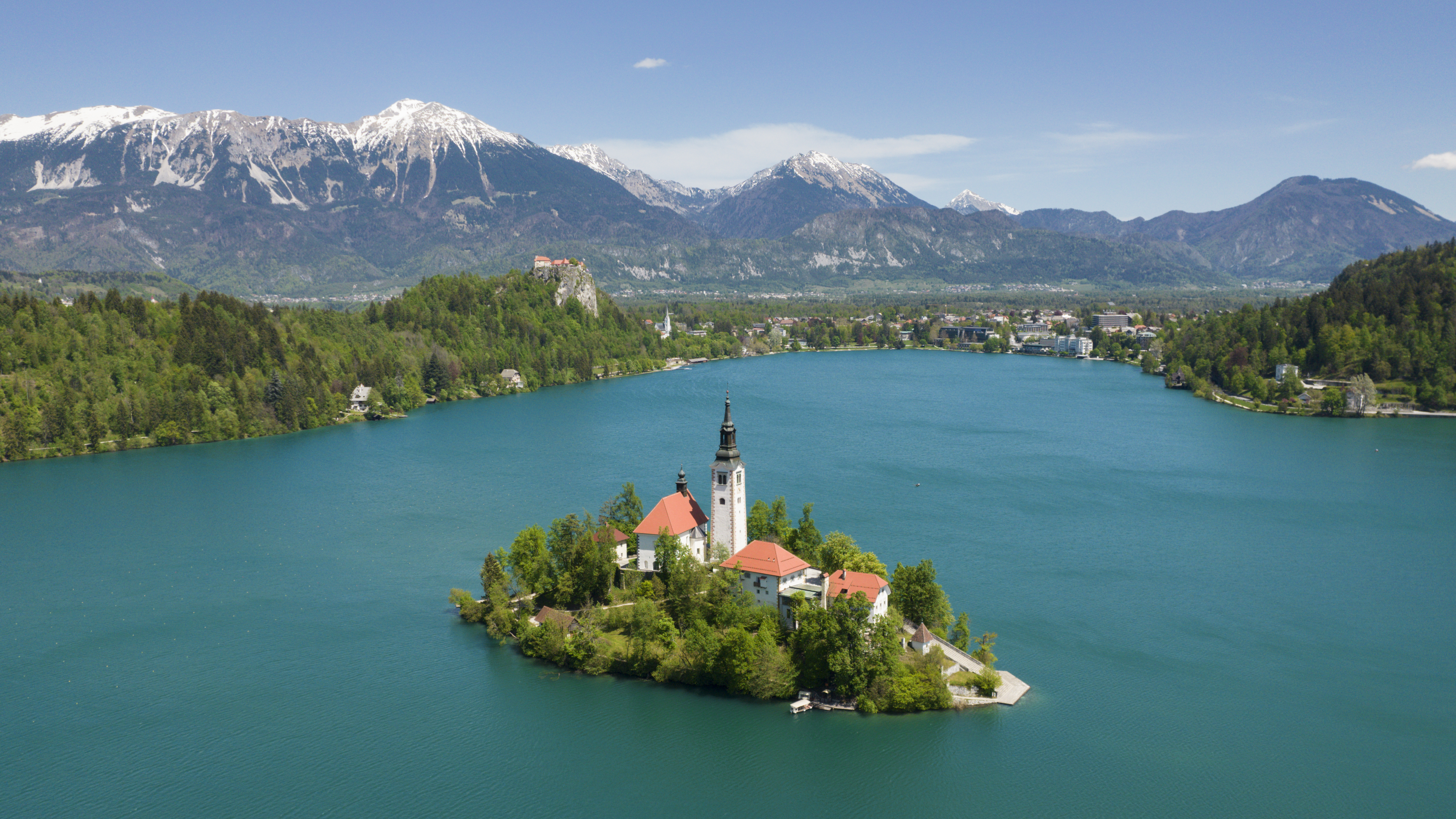

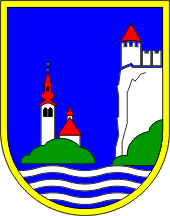
- Coat of arms

- Location of the Municipality of Bled in Slovenia
- Coordinates: 46°22′N 14°07′E
- Country: Slovenia

Government
  - Mayor: Anton Mežan (Independent)

Area
  - Total: 72 km^{2} (28 sq mi)
- Elevation: 501 m (1,644 ft)

Population (July 1, 2018)
  - Total: 7,835
  - Density: 110/km^{2} (280/sq mi)
- Time zone: UTC+01 (CET)
  - Summer (DST): UTC+02 (CEST)
- Postal code: 4260
- Vehicle registration: KR
- Website: www.e-bled.si

The Municipality of Bled (pronounced [ˈbleːt]; Slovene: Občina Bled) is a municipality in northwestern Slovenia in the Upper Carniola region. The seat of the municipality is the town of Bled, located on the shores of Lake Bled. The area is a popular tourist destination.

The Municipality of Bled was established in October 1994. It was greatly reduced in size with the establishment of the Municipality of Gorje in June 2006, having retained only 38% of its previous territory.

== Settlements ==
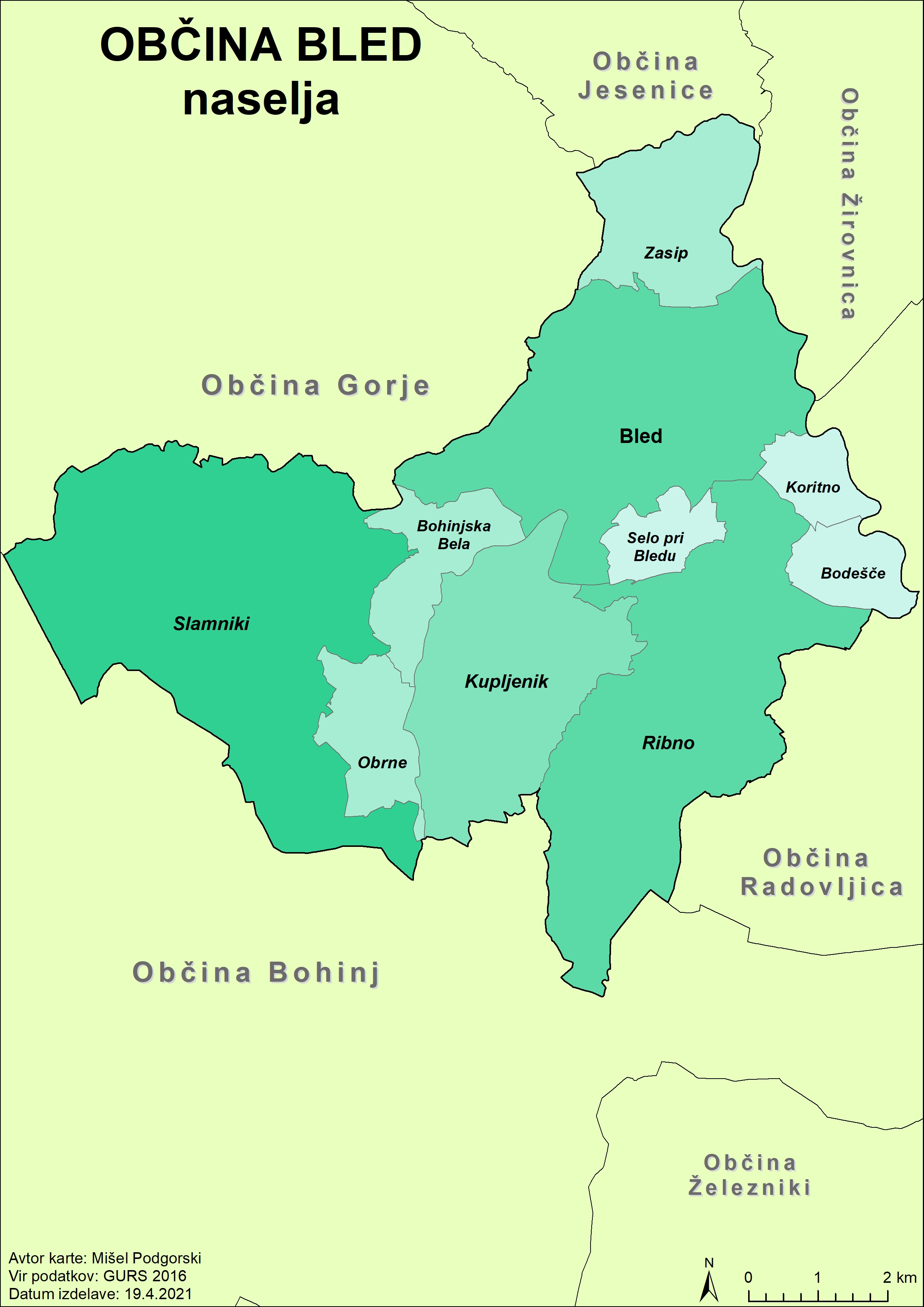
Villages in the municipality

In addition to the municipal seat of Bled, the municipality also includes the following settlements:

- Bodešče
- Bohinjska Bela
- Koritno
- Kupljenik
- Obrne
- Ribno
- Selo pri Bledu
- Slamniki
- Zasip

== Notable people ==
Notable people that were born or lived in the Municipality of Bled include:

- Iztok Čop (born 1972), rower, multiple Olympic medalist
- Peter Florjančič (born 1919), inventor
- Sara Isaković (born 1988), freestyle swimmer, Olympic medalist
- Špela Pretnar (born 1973), skier, Olympic athlete
- Julius von Payer (1841–1915), Arctic explorer, born in Šanov, Teplice
- Denis Žvegelj (born 1972), rower, Olympic medalist
