= Ajdna =

Mountain in Slovenia

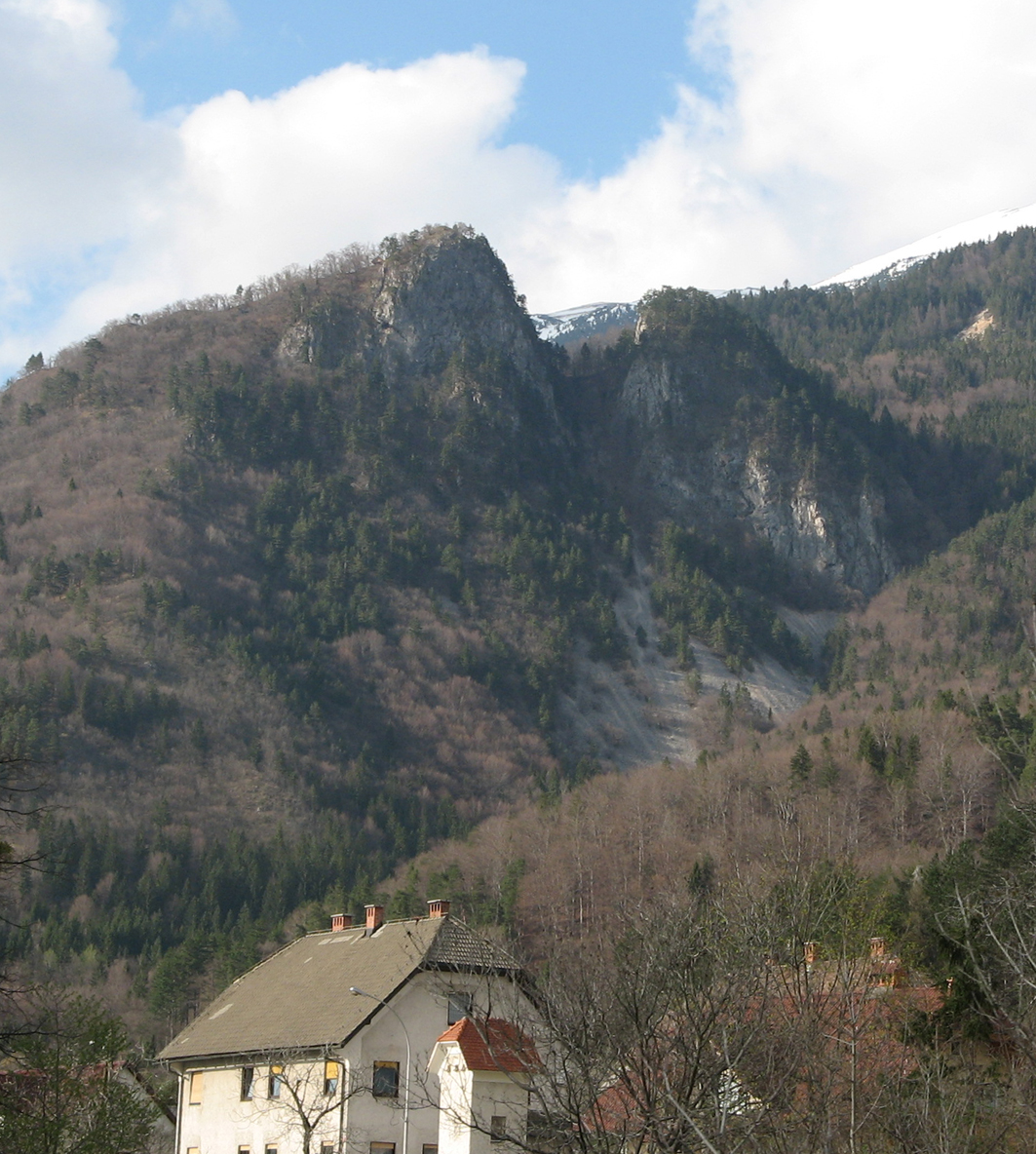
- View of Ajdna from Moste

Highest point
- Elevation: 1,064 m (3,491 ft)
- Coordinates: 46°25′17″N 14°07′54″E

Geography
- Location: Upper Carniola, Slovenia

Ajdna (1064 m) is a peak in the Karawanks in the Municipality of Žirovnica in the Upper Carniola region of Slovenia. Access to it is easiest from the village of Potoki in the neighbouring Municipality of Jesenice.

A settlement from late Antiquity has been found just below the summit and evidence shows that it was probably inhabited much earlier. Excavations began in 1976. Most evidence is from the period immediately after the collapse of the Roman Empire (476 AD), when it seems locals moved to the safety of the peak from the valley below during a period of upheaval and migration of various Germanic and Slavic tribes through the region. With its location high above the valley with a natural precipitous barrier towards the south and an excellent view up and down the Upper Sava Valley, Ajdna was an ideal location for a defendable settlement. A number of other high-elevation settlements from the period between the 4th and 6th centuries have been found in the area of Slovenia, but Ajdna lies at the highest elevation of all. Remains of a total of 25 buildings have been excavated, including an early Christian temple. In a nearby building eleven graves have been excavated and the potsherds, weapons, and jewellery found are on display in the museum in Kranj. It is believed this was not the main burial ground which has so far not been discovered. The remains of the religious building have been conserved, roofed over and are open to visitors.

Ajdna has been declared an archaeological monument of national importance by the Slovene government.

== Gallery ==
Aerial views of Ajdna

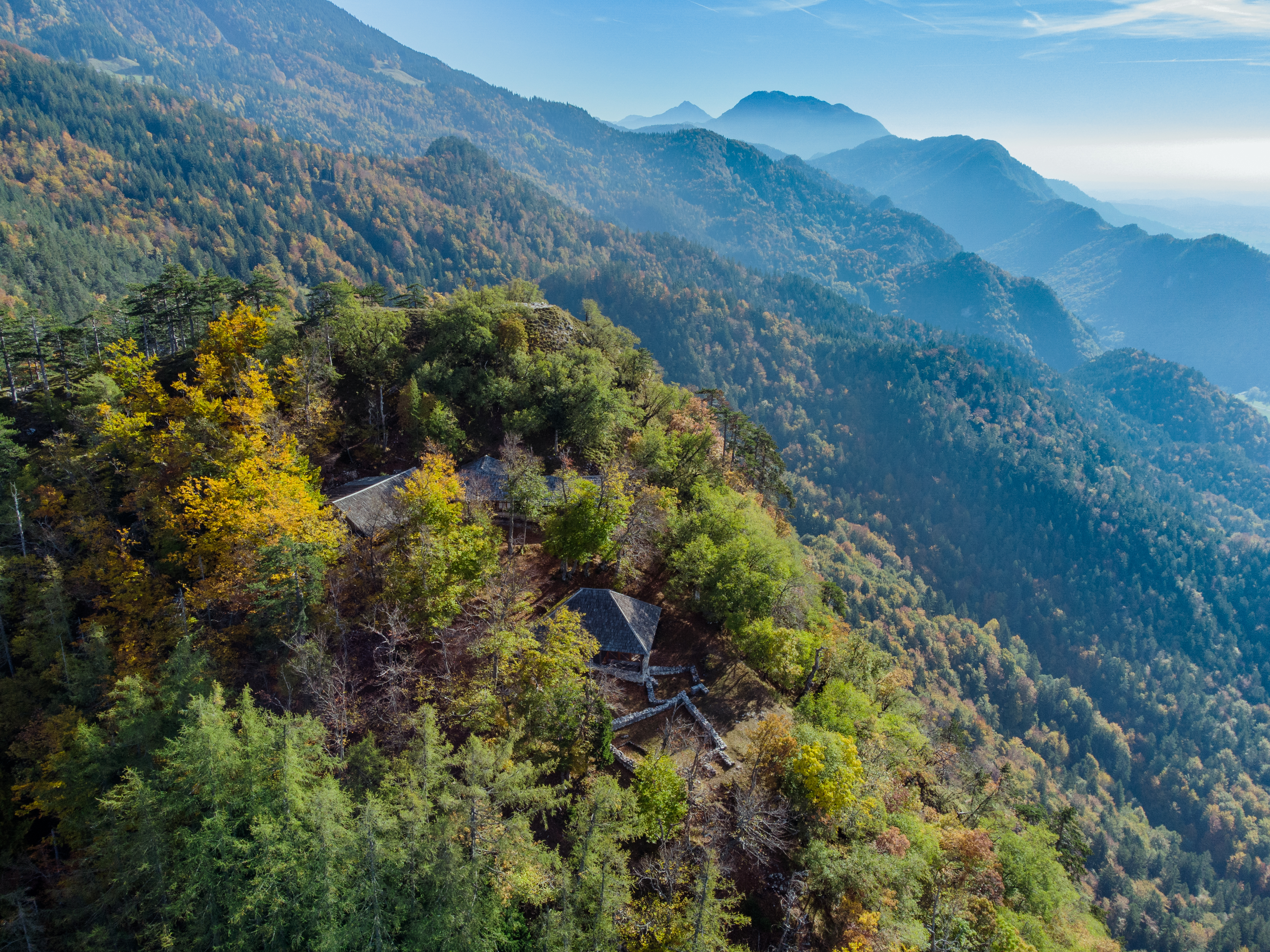

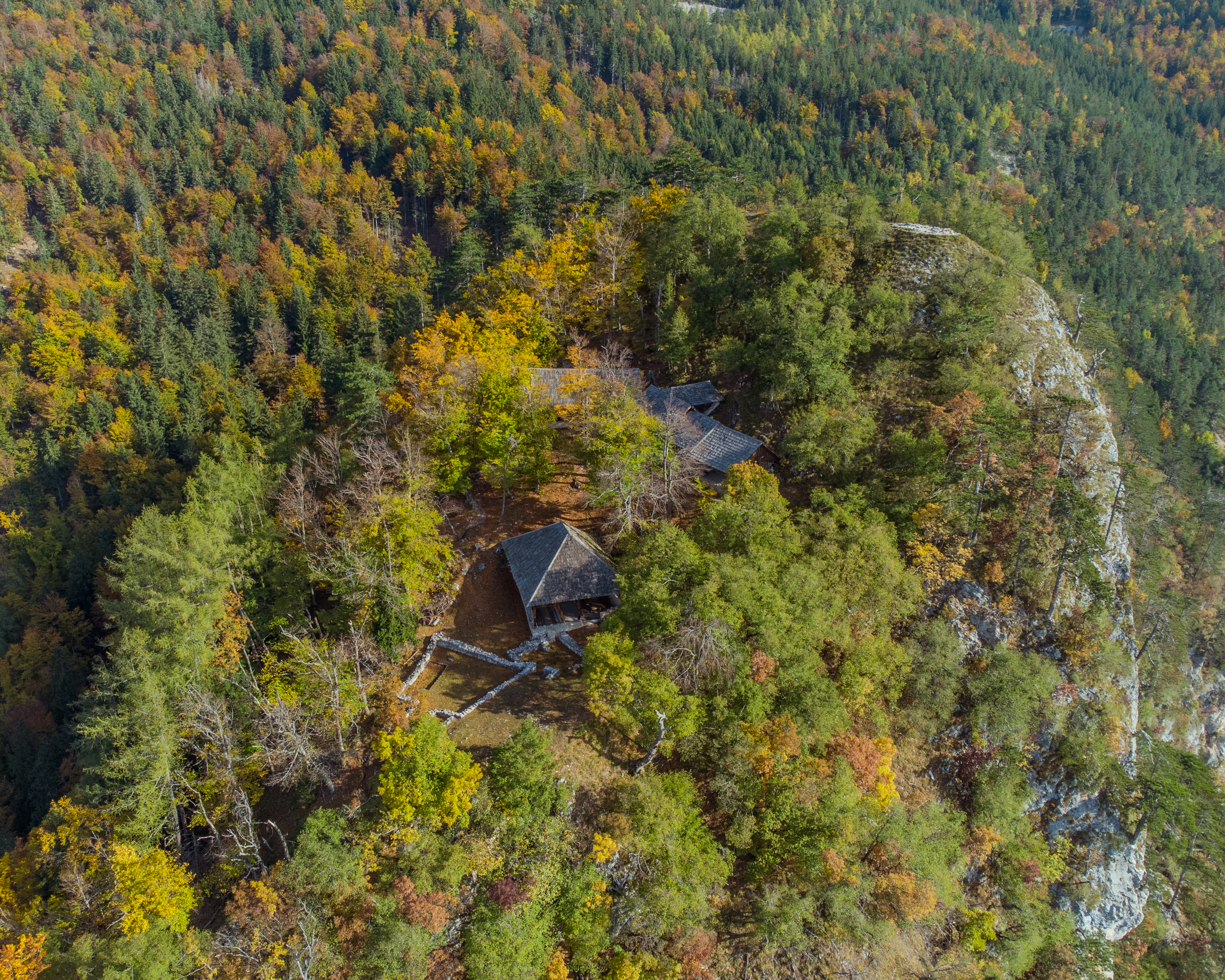

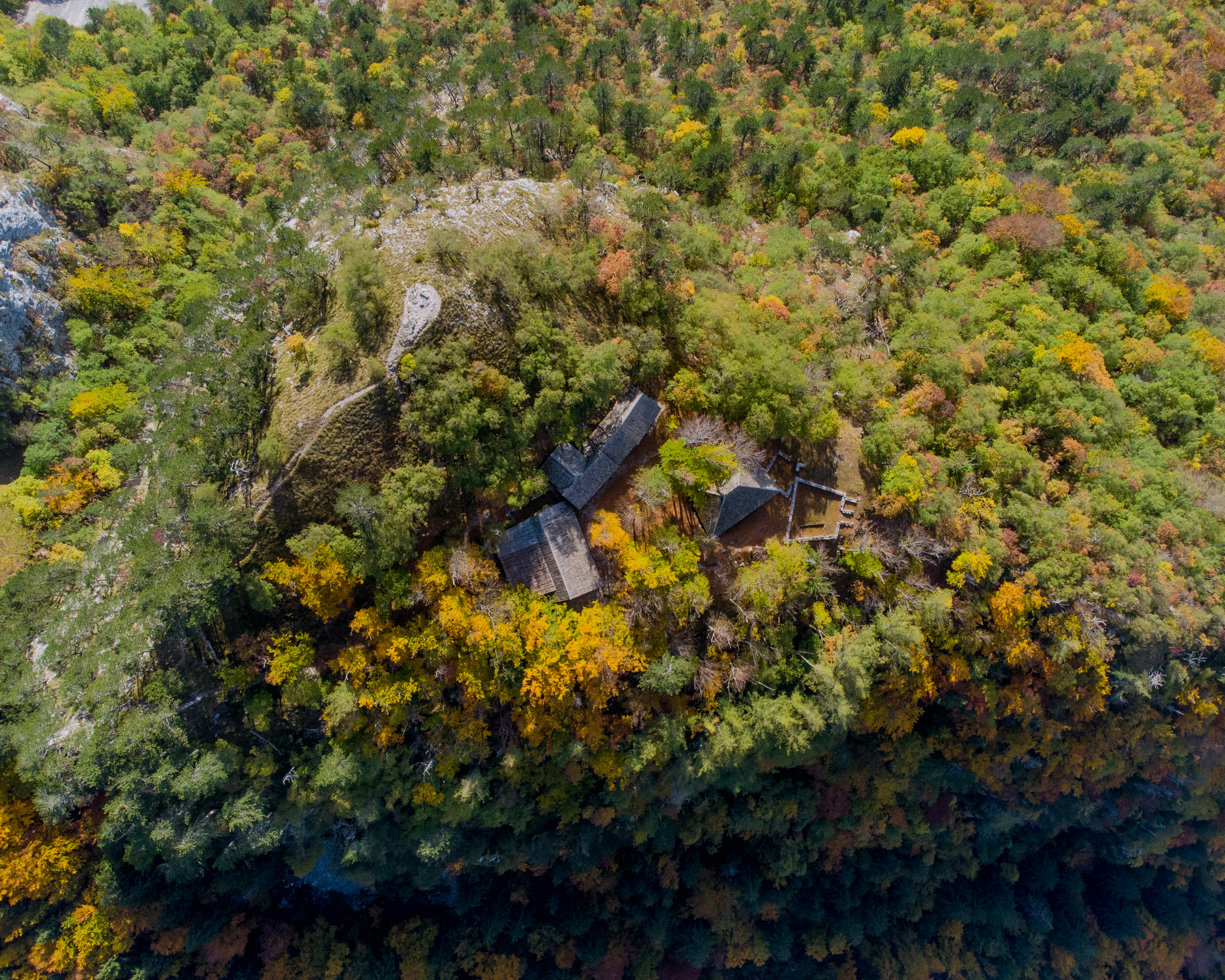
