= Kupljenik =

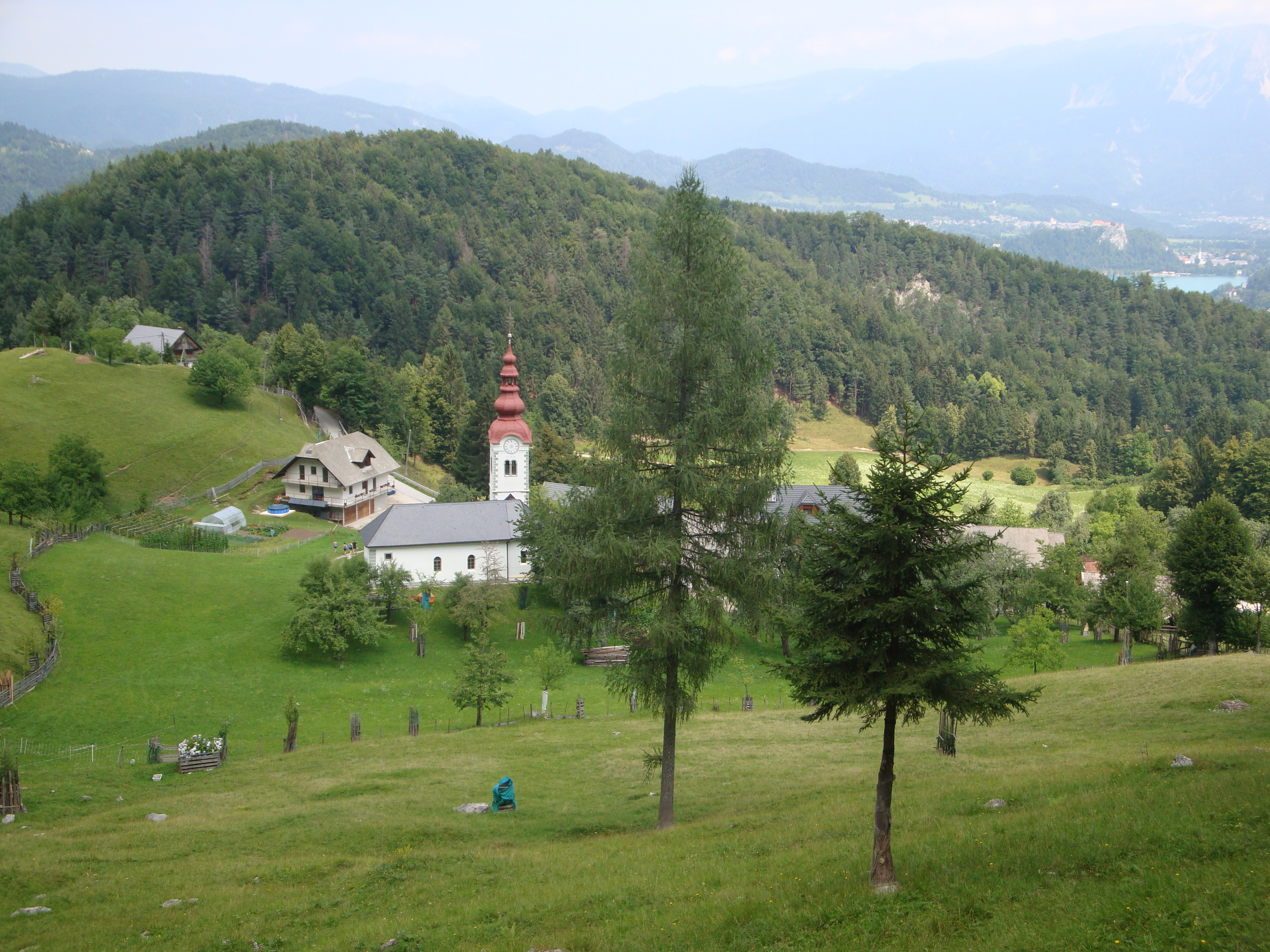

- Location in Slovenia
- Coordinates: 46°20′20.13″N 14°4′43.44″E
- Country: Slovenia
- Traditional Region: Upper Carniola
- Statistical region: Upper Carniola
- Municipality: Bled
- Elevation: 639.7 m (2,099 ft)

Population (2020)
  - Total: 52

Kupljenik (pronounced [kuˈpljeːnik]) is a village in the Municipality of Bled in the Upper Carniola region of Slovenia.

The village church is dedicated to Saint Stephen.
