= Razbor pri Čemšeniku =

- Location in Slovenia
- Coordinates: 46°10′55.24″N 14°57′24.72″E
- Country: Slovenia
- Traditional region: Upper Carniola
- Statistical region: Central Sava
- Municipality: Zagorje ob Savi

Area
  - Total: 1.41 km^{2} (0.54 sq mi)
- Elevation: 651.3 m (2,137 ft)

Population (2002)
  - Total: 53
- Postal code: 1413

Razbor pri Čemšeniku (pronounced [ˈɾaːzbɔɾ pɾi tʃɛmʃɛˈniːku] or [ɾazˈbɔɾ pɾi tʃɛmʃɛˈniːku]) is a settlement in the hills north of Izlake in the Municipality of Zagorje ob Savi in central Slovenia. The area is part of the traditional region of Upper Carniola, and is now included with the rest of the municipality in the Central Sava Statistical Region.

The local church is dedicated to Saints Primus and Felician and belongs to the Parish of Čemšenik. It dates to the second half of the 16th century.
