= Toplicioara River =

Toplicioara may refer to the following rivers in Romania:

- Toplicioara, a tributary of the Șoimuș in Bihor County
- Toplicioara, a tributary of the Voievodeasa in Harghita County
- Toplicioara cu Apă, a tributary of the Bâlta in Gorj County

== See also ==
- Toplița River (disambiguation)
