= Kingdom of Serbia =

Country in Southeastern Europe (1882–1918)

Kingdom of Serbia Краљевина Србија Kraljevina Srbija
- 1882–1918
- Flag Coat of arms
- Anthem: Боже правде Bože pravde (English: "God of Justice")
- Kingdom of Serbia in 1914
- Capital and largest city: Belgrade; 44°48′35″N 20°27′47″E
- Common languages: Serbian
- Religion: Eastern Orthodoxy
- Demonym: Serbian
- Government: Unitary parliamentary constitutional monarchy
- King
  - 1882–1889: Milan I
  - 1889–1903: Alexander I
  - 1903–1918: Peter I
- Prime Minister
  - 1882–1883 (first): Milan Piroćanac
  - 1912–1918 (last): Nikola Pašić
- Legislature: National Assembly
- History
  - Proclamation: 6 March 1882
  - May Coup: 10 June 1903
  - Treaty of London: 30 May 1913
  - Treaty of Bucharest: 10 August 1913
  - Corfu Declaration: 20 July 1917
  - Unification of Montenegro with Serbia: 28 November 1918
  - Creation of Yugoslavia: 21 December 1918
- Currency: Serbian dinar
Preceded by
1882: Principality of Serbia
1918: Kingdom of Montenegro
Succeeded by
1915: Military General Governorate of Serbia
1915: Bulgarian occupation of Serbia
1918: Kingdom of SHS
- Today part of: Serbia; North Macedonia; Kosovo

The Kingdom of Serbia (Note: Serbian: Краљевина Србија, Kraljevina Srbija) was a monarchy located in Southeastern Europe which was created when the ruler of the Principality of Serbia, Milan I, was proclaimed king in 1882.

Since 1817, the Principality was ruled by the Obrenović dynasty (replaced by the Karađorđević dynasty for a short time). The Principality of Serbia, under the suzerainty of the Ottoman Empire, de facto achieved full independence when the very last Ottoman troops left Belgrade in 1867. The Congress of Berlin in 1878 recognized the formal independence of the Principality of Serbia, and in its composition Nišava, Pirot, Toplica and Vranje districts entered the South part of Serbia.

In 1882, Serbia was elevated to the status of a kingdom, initially maintaining a foreign policy friendly to Austria-Hungary before turning to the Russian Empire and France following a coup d'état in 1903. Between 1912 and 1913, Serbia greatly enlarged its territory through engagement in the First and Second Balkan Wars – Sandžak-Raška, Kosovo Vilayet and Vardar Macedonia were annexed. At the end of World War I in 1918 it united with Vojvodina and the Kingdom of Montenegro, and in December 1918 it merged with the newly created State of Slovenes, Croats and Serbs to form the Kingdom of Serbs, Croats and Slovenes (later known as Kingdom of Yugoslavia) under the continued rule of the Karađorđević dynasty.

== History ==
=== Principality of Serbia ===
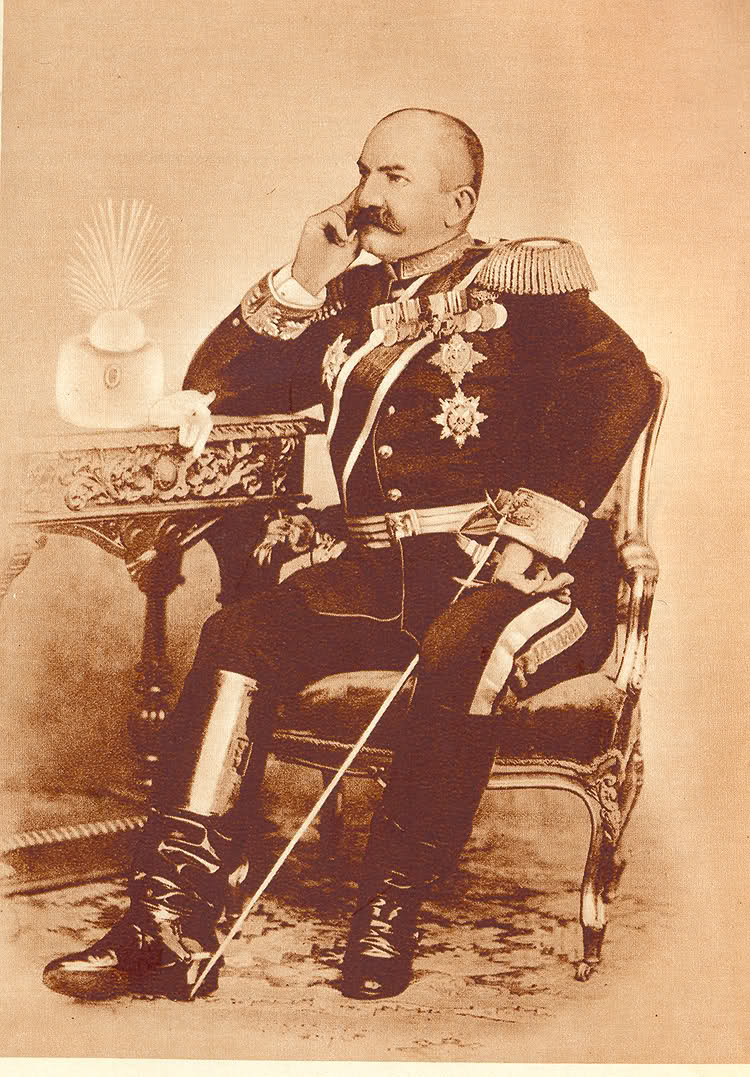
King Milan I

The Principality of Serbia was a state in the Balkans that came into existence as a result of the Serbian revolution which lasted between 1804 and 1817. Despite brutal oppression and retaliation by the Ottoman authorities, the revolutionary leaders, first Karađorđe and then Miloš Obrenović, succeeded in their goal to liberate Serbia after centuries of Turkish rule.

At first, the principality included only the territory of the former Pashaluk of Belgrade, but in 1831–1833 it expanded to the east, south, and west. In the first decades of the principality, the population was about 85% Serb and 15% non-Serb. Of those, most were Vlachs, and there were some Turkicized Muslim Albanians, which were the overwhelming majority of the Muslims that lived in Smederevo, Kladovo and Ćuprija. The new state aimed to homogenize its population, especially after two Great Migrations of the Serbs also known as the Great Exoduses of the Serbs, in 1690 and in 18th century, between 1718 and 1739, from various territories under the rule of the Ottoman Empire, particularly the Kosovo Vilayet, to the Kingdom of Hungary under the Habsburg monarchy. As a result, from 1830 to 1876, it has been estimated that up to 150,000 Albanians that lived in the territories of the Principality of Serbia emigrated or were expelled.

In 1867 the Ottoman army garrisons retreated from the Principality, securing its de facto independence. Serbia expanded further to the south-east in 1878, when it won full international recognition at the Congress of Berlin.

After the 1877–1878 expansion, in the new areas (present-day Jablanica, Toplica and parts of Nišava District) an estimated 49,000–130,000 Albanians were expelled (Expulsion of the Albanians 1877–1878), settling mainly in Kosovo. These events marked the beginning of the Serbian-Albanian conflict.

The elite of Serbia was divided into two camps, the liberals vs. the conservatives, which corresponded to the similar division in the Russian intelligentsia between the "Westernizers" vs. the "Slavophiles". Many of the terms and ideas used in the debate in Serbia were borrowed directly from the Russian debate between Slavophiles and Westernizers. The conservatives wanted an society dominated by the Orthodox Church, were suspicious of Western values, looked back towards an idealized version of the medieval Serbian empire and generally preferred to preserve the predominately rural Serb society. The liberals looked towards the West as a model; wanted less power for the Orthodox Church; looked forward to the future, and favored reforms designed to transform Serbia into a modern industrial, urbanized society. By the beginning of the 1880s, Serbia along with Montenegro were the only European nations that had no railroads. The lack of railroads sparked a bitter debate in the parliament with the liberals pressing for a railroad while the conservatives were opposed, warning that the changes that would be introduced by the railroad would be the end of traditional Serb society. One conservative deputy warned that building railroads would cause Serbia to "suffer the same fate of the Indians following the discovery of America...Columbus brought European culture to America, but with it also the chains of slavery". There was also the question of independence vs. dependence as Serbia was very much in the Austrian sphere of influence both politically and economically until 1903, and Serbia had been bullied into signing a series of trade agreements with the Austrian empire that were highly disadvantageous from the Serb viewpoint. Unable to generate much economic growth, Serbia was forced into debt with the Serb national debt raising from 16.5 million francs in 1880 to 903.8 million francs in 1914. The two most popular political parties, the Progress Party and the Radical Party, both represented the liberal tendency in Serb politics. However, the idea of "progress" generated fears of a loss of national identity and that all that made Serbia unique would disappear forever, which was expressed in novels by writers such as Laza Kostić, Đura Jakšić and Stevan Sremac. An editorial in the Belgrade newspaper Dnevni List (Daily Newspaper) stated: "Nowhere else in the world can one see the miraculous and absurd situation that the modern ideas of political and social progress are advocated in parliament by village cash-loan givers, former municipal cops, and illiterate bench-sitters and chicken sellers".

Serbia was a predominately agrarian society with most Serbs living in an extended family unit known as the zadruga. Serbia had one of the highest birthrates in Europe with the population increasing by 71.3% between 1880 and 1914. At least part of the population increase was due to the structure of the zadruga, which provided for sharing the burden of child-rearing while also ensuring that young men could marry without first owning land or learning a craft as was the norm in Western Europe. Serb couples tended to marry young. Serb society was extremely patriarchal with fathers and husbands having absolute authority over their wives and children. Legally, a man remained a minor until his father died, and it was common for a zadruga to be dominated by grandfathers who exercised absolute power over their sons and grandsons along with the women in the zadruga. The German historian Marie-Jannine Calic wrote: "The zadruga represented a community of property, life, work, and authority. Private property did not exist, not even money". In the late 19th century, the zadruga started to break down in part because family units of about 20-40 people were too large to share the same plot of land; in part because of the coming of a market economy in place of the previous barter economy, which made it possible for a couple to break away from a zadruga without suffering economic ruin; and in part because of a tendency of many young men to learn a trade or a craft in order to escape the patriarchal zadruga. In the Ottoman era, the majority of the land was owned by Muslim pashas or beys, and in the aftermath of independence, the feudal estates of the Muslim aristocracy were broken up. Serbia was one of the few places in Eastern Europe at the time where the peasantry owned their own land instead of working in a feudal estate owned by some nobleman. However, land was owned by the zadruga instead of by individuals, and legally land owned by a zadruga could only be divided in exceptional conditions. Poverty was extreme in rural Serbia owing to the small size of the farms vs. the large zadrugas, and between 1910 and 1914 two-thirds of Serb farmers were not able to make an existential minimum. Surveys revealed that half of Serb farmers did not own a yoke of oxen while a third did not own plows or even beds. By October of each year, about 28% of rural Serbs suffered from food insecurity, and by the time of January–February about 46% of rural Serbs suffered from food insecurity. The increasing population along with the poverty led to a tendency to increase farmland instead of increasing yields as it was common for farmers to turn woods and meadows into grain fields alongside a tendency to switch from a meat-based diet to a vegetarian diet. The upper and middle classes in Serbia represented a small percentage of the population. Besides for the royal family, Belgrade had only six millionaires in 1900. In the cities such as Belgrade, people started to discard the traditional clothing in favor of Western style clothing by the 1890s as a symbol of modernity and progress.

=== Serbo-Bulgarian War ===
The Serbo-Bulgarian War erupted on 14 November 1885, and lasted until 28 November of the same year. The war ended in defeat for Serbia, as it had failed to capture the Slivnitsa region which it had set out to achieve. Bulgarians successfully repelled the Serbs after the decisive victory at the Battle of Slivnitsa and advanced into Serbian territory taking Pirot and clearing the way to Niš.

When Austria-Hungary declared that it would join the war on the side of Serbia, Bulgaria withdrew from Serbia leaving the Serbo-Bulgarian border precisely where it had been prior to the war. The peace treaty was signed on 19 February 1886, in Bucharest. As a result of the war, European powers acknowledged the act of Unification of Bulgaria which happened on 6 September 1885.

=== Balkan Wars and expansion ===
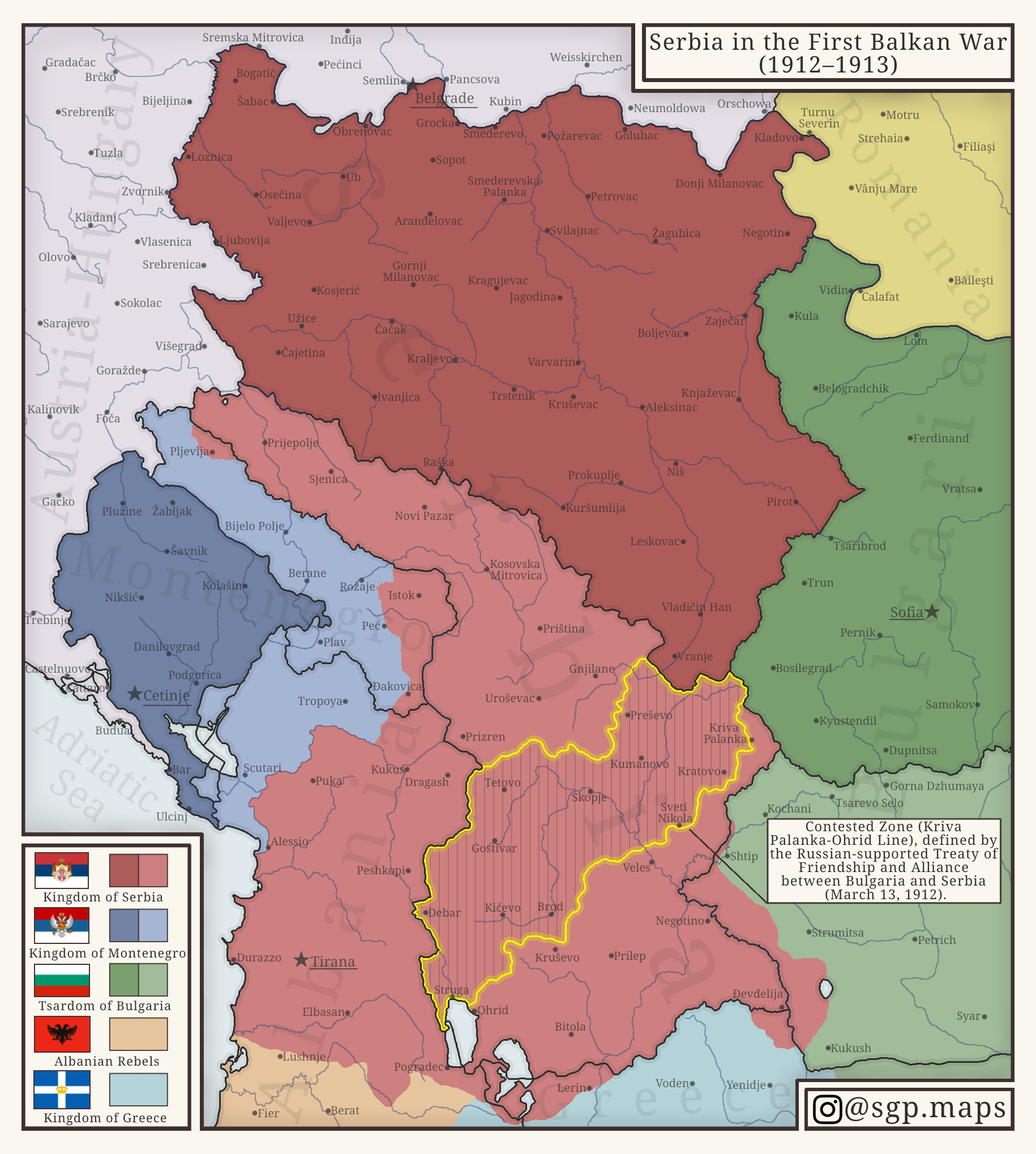
Territorial expansion of the Kingdom of Serbia in 1913

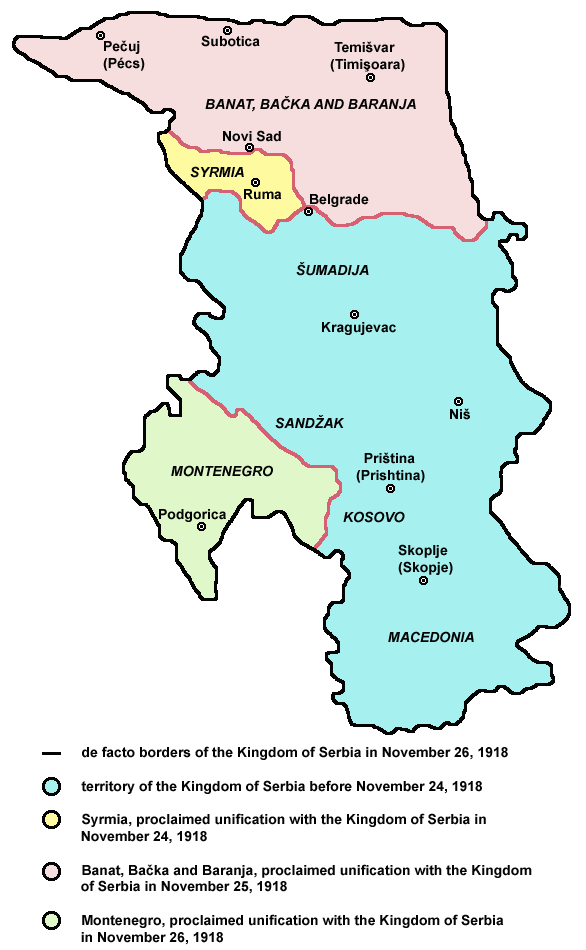
Serbia in 1918 (27 November – 1 December, during de facto military demarcation)

Negotiations between Russia, Serbia and Bulgaria led to the Serbian-Bulgarian Treaty of Alliance of March 1912, which aimed to conquer and to divide the Ottoman held Macedonia. In May, a Serbian-Greek alliance was reached and in October 1912, a Serbia-Montenegro alliance was signed.

After the war started, Serbia, together with Montenegro, conquered Pristina and Novi Pazar. At the Battle of Kumanovo Serbs defeated the Ottoman army and proceeded to conquer Skopje and the whole of Kosovo vilayet. The region of Metohija was taken by Montenegro. At Bitola and Ohrid Serbian army units established contact with the Greek army. Populations of ethnic Serbs and Albanians tended to shift following territorial conquests. As a result of the multi-ethnic composition of Kosovo, the new administrations provoked a mixed response from the local population. Serbs considered this a liberation.

On 29 November 1913, the Drač County of the Kingdom of Serbia was established on the part of the territory of Albania taken from the Ottoman Empire during the First Balkan War. Serbian Drač County had four districts (Serbian: срез): Drač (Durrës), Lješ (Lezhë), Elbasan and Tirana.

After the First Balkan War of 1912, territories of Kosovo and north-western Macedonia were internationally recognised as a part of Serbia and northern Metohija as a part of Montenegro at the Treaty of London of May 1913. In a report to Rome, Lazër Mjeda, Archbishop of Skopje, estimated that 25,000 Albanians were killed by Serbian forces during and after the conflict.

The old disagreements regarding the territory of Macedonia among the members of the Balkan League and primarily Serbia and Bulgaria, led to the Second Balkan War. Here, Serbia, Greece, Romania, the Ottoman Empire, and Montenegro fought against Bulgaria in 1913.

The final borders were ratified at the Treaty of Bucharest of 1913. Serbia came to control the land which became known as Vardar Macedonia, and today stands independent as the Republic of North Macedonia but land-locked Serbia was prevented from gaining access to the Adriatic Sea by the newly established Principality of Albania.

As the result of these wars, Serbia's population increased from 2.9 million to 4.5 million and territory increased by 81%.

=== Assassination in Sarajevo ===
The assassination of Archduke Franz Ferdinand of Austria on 28 June 1914 in Sarajevo (then part of Austria-Hungary) brought the tensions between Austria-Hungary and Serbia to a head. Behind the assassination in Sarajevo was the secret Serbian officers organization Black Hand. The assassins were supported by an "underground railroad" of Serbian civilians and military officers that provided transportation and hid them; members of the Serbian military that trained them, encouraged them, and provided weapons, maps, and other information. After the assassination, the conspirators were arrested in Bosnia-Herzegovina and tried in Sarajevo in October 1914.

The political objective of the assassination was to break the southern Slav provinces off from the Austro-Hungarian Empire. Assassination of Archduke Franz Ferdinand triggered a chain of international events that embroiled Russia and the major European powers in the conflict.

=== World War I ===
On 28 July 1914, Austria-Hungary declared war against Serbia.

In 1915 Serbia was occupied by foreign troops after a combined invasion by Austro-Hungarian, German, and Bulgarian troops. The 135,000 soldiers of the Serbian Army retreated through Albania and were evacuated to the Greek island of Corfu, and in spring, 1916, they became part of a newly formed Salonika front. In 1916, the Kingdom of Montenegro was conquered by Austria-Hungary.

At the end of the war and the collapse of Austria-Hungary, Serbia experienced a loss of 28% of its pre-war population and went through radical changes after the liberation, all within days. On 28 November 1918, it absorbed the Kingdom of Montenegro at the Podgorica Assembly.

On 1 December 1918, Serbia united with the newly created State of Slovenes, Croats, and Serbs to form a new southern Slav state, the Kingdom of Serbs, Croats and Slovenes. The new country continued to be ruled by the Serbian monarchy when in August 1921 Prince Alexandar I became king.

== Politics ==
In 1888 People's Radical Party led by Sava Grujić and Nikola Pašić came to power and a new constitution, based on the liberal Constitution of Belgium was introduced. The lost war and the Radical Party's total electoral victory were some of the reasons why King Milan I abdicated in 1889. His son Alexander I assumed the throne in 1893 and in 1894 dismissed the constitution.

Jews from modern-day North Macedonia got their citizen rights after the region became a part of Kingdom of Serbia.

=== May Coup ===
King Alexander I of Serbia and his unpopular wife Queen Draga were assassinated inside the Royal Palace in Belgrade on the night of 28–29 May 1903. Other representatives of the Obrenović family were shot as well. This act resulted in the extinction of the House of Obrenović, which had been ruling Serbia since 1817.

After the May Coup the Serbian Skupština invited Peter Karađorđević to assume the Serbian crown as Peter I of Serbia. A constitutional monarchy was created with the military Black Hand society operating behind the scenes. The traditionally good relations with Austria-Hungary ended, as the new dynasty relied on the support of the Russian Empire and closer cooperation with Kingdom of Bulgaria.

=== Pig war ===
In April 1904 the Friendship treaty and in June 1905 the customs union with Bulgaria were signed. In response Austria-Hungary imposed a Tariff War (Pig war) of 1906–1909. After the 1906 elections the People's Radical Party came to power. In 1908 Austria-Hungary annexed Bosnia, where Serbia had hoped to expand its territory.

=== Bosnian Crisis ===
The Bosnian Crisis of 1908–1909 (also referred to as the Annexation crisis) erupted into public view when on 5 October 1908, the Kingdom of Bulgaria declared its complete independence from Ottoman Empire and on 6 October 1908, when Austria-Hungary announced the annexation of Bosnia and Herzegovina, which was populated mainly by South Slavs.

Austria-Hungary had ambitions of imperialistic expansion and saw the Balkans in the same way that other colonial powers saw Africa or Asia. This idea was severely opposed by the Serbian public and intelligentsia, mainly gathered around Serbian Literary Herald (Srpski književni glasnik).

Russia, the Ottoman Empire, Britain, the Kingdom of Italy, Serbia, the Principality of Montenegro, German Empire and France took an interest in these events. In April 1909, the 1878 Treaty of Berlin was amended to accept the new status quo and bringing the crisis to an end. The crisis permanently damaged relations between Austria-Hungary on the one hand and Russia and Serbia on the other. The annexation and reactions to the annexation were some of the contributing causes of World War I.

=== Administrative divisions ===
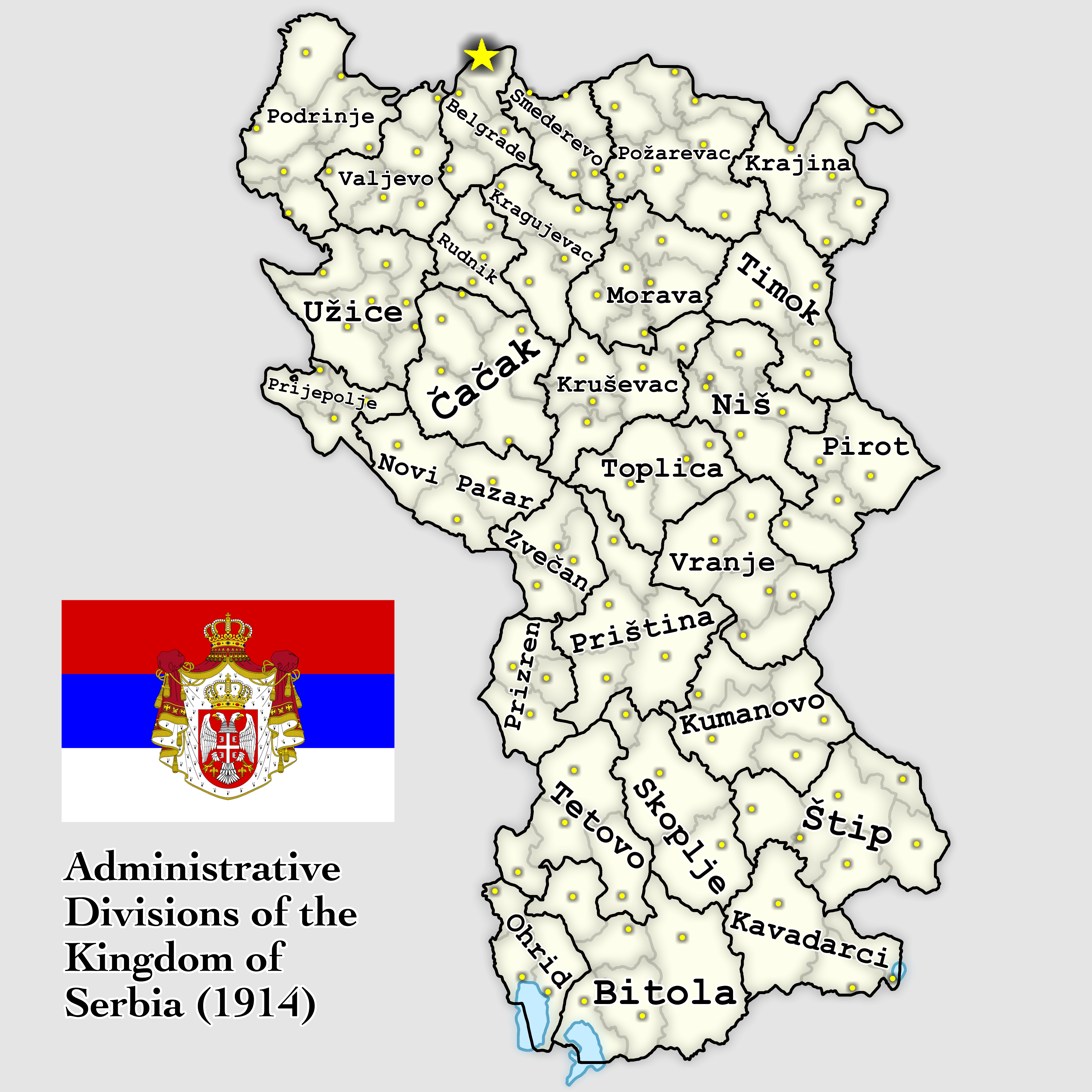
Districts (okruzi) of the Kingdom of Serbia, 1914

In 1890, it was divided into 15 districts (okruzi) which were further divided into counties (srezovi). Cities of Belgrade and Niš had special administrative status. The districts were: Valjevo, Vranje, Kragujevac, Krajina, Kruševac, Morava, Pirot, Podrinje, Podunavlje, Požarevac, Rudnik, Timok, Toplica, Užice and Crna Reka.

In 1912 and 1913 Serbia enlarged its territory after victorious First Balkan War. In August 1913, 11 new districts were formed in the newly liberated areas: Bitola, Debar, Kavadarci, Novi Pazar, Kumanovo, Pljevlja, Prizren, Priština, Skopje, Tetovo and Štip.

== Monarchs ==
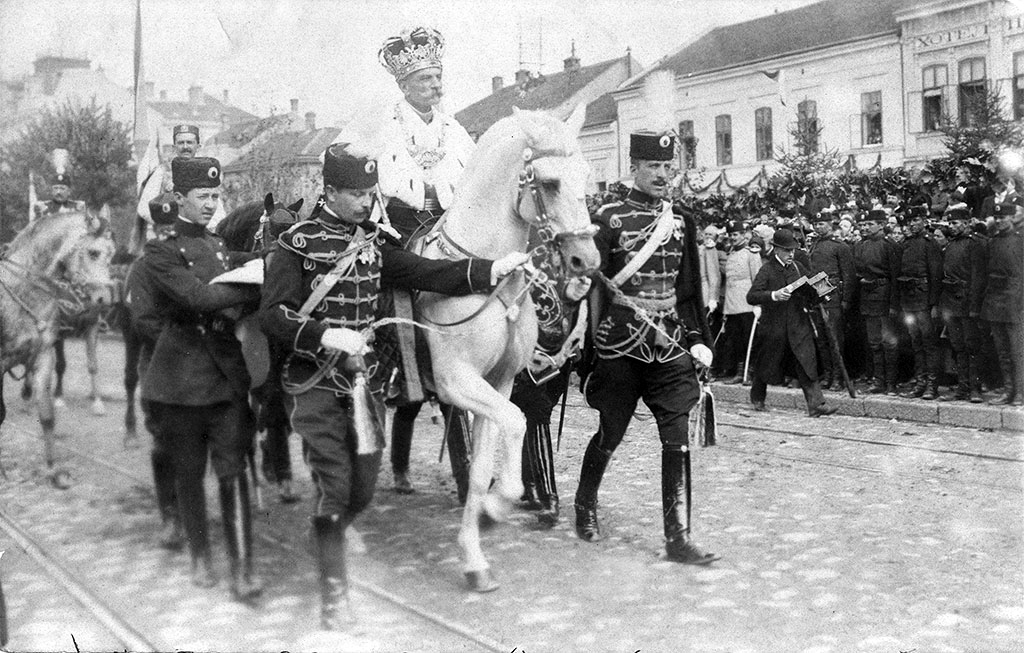
Coronation of Peter I on 21 September 1904

During its existence, the Kingdom was ruled by two competing dynasties: the House of Obrenović and the House of Karađorđević. King Milan I ruled from 6 March 1882 to 6 March 1889, when he abdicated the throne. He was succeeded by his son, Alexander I, who ruled from 6 March 1889 to 11 June 1903, when he was killed by a group of officers. The slaughter of the royal couple (the king and Queen Draga) by the Black Hand shocked Europe. This opened the way for the descendants of Karađorđe, regarded by Serbs throughout the Balkans as the man who threw off the Ottoman yoke, to return to the throne. Peter Karađorđević was initially reluctant to accept the crown, disgusted as he was by the coup d'état. However, he finally did accept and was the Kingdom's sovereign from 15 June 1903 to 1 December 1918, the day that the Kingdom of Serbs, Croats and Slovenes was proclaimed.

== Demographics ==
The largest cities in the Kingdom of Serbia were (with population figures from c. 1910–1912):

Largest cities or towns in Kingdom of Serbia https://pod2.stat.gov.rs/ObjavljenePublikacije/G1953/pdf/G19534002.pdf
Rank		District	Pop.	Rank		District	Pop.
1	Belgrade	City of Belgrade	100,000	11	Leskovac	Vranje okrug	14,300
2	Prizren	Prizren okrug	60,000	12	Tetovo	Tetovo okrug	56,059
3	Bitolj	Bitolj okrug	54,000	13	Požarevac	Požarevac okrug	13,600
4	Skoplje	Skoplje okrug	50,000	14	Šabac	Podrinje okrug	12,800
5	Niš	Niš okrug	25,000	15	Mitrovica	Priština okrug	12,000
6	Veles	Skoplje okrug	24,000	16	Vranje	Vranje okrug	10,500
7	Priština	Priština okrug	20,000	17	Pirot	Pirot okrug	10,000
8	Prilep	Bitolj okrug	20,000
9	Kragujevac	Kragujevac okrug	18,500
10	Ohrid	Ohrid okrug	18,000

== Economy ==
Serbia was geographically located in the path of several trade routes linking Western and Central Europe with Middle East. The Morava Valley was part of the strategically important terrestrial route that linked Central Europe with Greece and Constantinople. During the 19th century major efforts were made to improve the transport in this connections. At the Congress of Berlin in 1878, Austria-Hungary helped Serbia to gain new territories, conditioning Serbia, however, to sign a new convention. The convention obliged Serbia to construct the railway line from Belgrade to Vranje and Turkish and Bulgarian borders in three years. In addition, the obligation to sign commercial contracts was imposed on Serbia, as well as a claim to carry out regulation works in Đerdap. Serbian Government approved this treaty by adopting the Law on Proclamation of the convention. Consequently, Serbian Railways were formed in 1881. The regular traffic on the railway line Belgrade–Niš started in 1884.

== Culture ==
The Kingdom of Serbia participated in the International Exhibition of Art of 1911, with a number of artists showing their work as a part of the Serbian pavilion, including Marko Murat, Ivan Meštrović, Đorđe Jovanović and other artists.

== See also ==
- History of Serbia

== Sources ==
- Calic, Marie-Janine (2019). A History of Yugoslavia. West Lafayette: Purdue University. ISBN 978-1-55753-838-3.
- Ćirković, Sima (2004). The Serbs. Malden: Blackwell Publishing. ISBN 9781405142915.
- Гавриловић, Владан С. (2014). "Примери миграција српског народа у угарске провинцијалне области 1699–1737" [Examples of Serbian Migrations to Hungarian Provincial Districts 1699–1737]. Истраживања (in Serbian). 25. Филозофски факултет у Новом Саду: 139–148.
- Rama, Shinasi (2019). Nation Failure, Ethnic Elites, and Balance of Power: The International Administration of Kosova. Springer. ISBN 978-3030051921.

Region	until 1918	1918– 1929	1929– 1945	1941– 1945	1945– 1946	1946– 1963	1963– 1992	1992– 2003	2003– 2006	2006– 2008	since 2008
Slovenia	Part of Austria-Hungary including the Bay of Kotor See also: Kingdom of Croatia-Slavonia (1868–1918) Kingdom of Dalmatia (1815–1918) Condominium of Bosnia and Herzegovina (1878–1918)	State of Slovenes, Croats and Serbs (1918) Kingdom of Serbs, Croats and Slovenes (1918–1929) Kingdom of Yugoslavia (1929–1943) See also: Republic of Prekmurje (1919) Banat, Bačka and Baranja (1918–1919) Free State of Fiume (1920–1924) (1924–1945) Italian province of Zadar (1920–1947)		Annexed by Italy, Germany, and Hungary^{a}	Democratic Federal Yugoslavia (1943–1945) Federal People's Republic of Yugoslavia (1945–1963) Socialist Federal Republic of Yugoslavia (1963–1992) Consisted of the Socialist Republics of: Slovenia (1945–1991); Croatia (1945–1991); Bosnia and Herzegovina (1945–1992) Serbia (1945–1992) (included the autonomous provinces of Vojvodina and Kosovo) Montenegro (1945–1992); Macedonia (1945–1991) See also: Free Territory of Trieste (1947–1954)^{h}			Republic of Slovenia; Ten-Day War			
Dalmatia	Part of Austria-Hungary including the Bay of Kotor See also: Kingdom of Croatia-Slavonia (1868–1918) Kingdom of Dalmatia (1815–1918) Condominium of Bosnia and Herzegovina (1878–1918)	State of Slovenes, Croats and Serbs (1918) Kingdom of Serbs, Croats and Slovenes (1918–1929) Kingdom of Yugoslavia (1929–1943) See also: Republic of Prekmurje (1919) Banat, Bačka and Baranja (1918–1919) Free State of Fiume (1920–1924) (1924–1945) Italian province of Zadar (1920–1947)		Independent State of Croatia (1941–1945) Puppet state of Germany. Parts annexed by Italy. Međimurje and Baranja annexed by Hungary.	Democratic Federal Yugoslavia (1943–1945) Federal People's Republic of Yugoslavia (1945–1963) Socialist Federal Republic of Yugoslavia (1963–1992) Consisted of the Socialist Republics of: Slovenia (1945–1991); Croatia (1945–1991); Bosnia and Herzegovina (1945–1992) Serbia (1945–1992) (included the autonomous provinces of Vojvodina and Kosovo) Montenegro (1945–1992); Macedonia (1945–1991) See also: Free Territory of Trieste (1947–1954)^{h}			Republic of Croatia^{b} Croatian War of Independence			
Slavonia	Part of Austria-Hungary including the Bay of Kotor See also: Kingdom of Croatia-Slavonia (1868–1918) Kingdom of Dalmatia (1815–1918) Condominium of Bosnia and Herzegovina (1878–1918)	State of Slovenes, Croats and Serbs (1918) Kingdom of Serbs, Croats and Slovenes (1918–1929) Kingdom of Yugoslavia (1929–1943) See also: Republic of Prekmurje (1919) Banat, Bačka and Baranja (1918–1919) Free State of Fiume (1920–1924) (1924–1945) Italian province of Zadar (1920–1947)		Independent State of Croatia (1941–1945) Puppet state of Germany. Parts annexed by Italy. Međimurje and Baranja annexed by Hungary.	Democratic Federal Yugoslavia (1943–1945) Federal People's Republic of Yugoslavia (1945–1963) Socialist Federal Republic of Yugoslavia (1963–1992) Consisted of the Socialist Republics of: Slovenia (1945–1991); Croatia (1945–1991); Bosnia and Herzegovina (1945–1992) Serbia (1945–1992) (included the autonomous provinces of Vojvodina and Kosovo) Montenegro (1945–1992); Macedonia (1945–1991) See also: Free Territory of Trieste (1947–1954)^{h}			Republic of Croatia^{b} Croatian War of Independence			
Croatia	Part of Austria-Hungary including the Bay of Kotor See also: Kingdom of Croatia-Slavonia (1868–1918) Kingdom of Dalmatia (1815–1918) Condominium of Bosnia and Herzegovina (1878–1918)	State of Slovenes, Croats and Serbs (1918) Kingdom of Serbs, Croats and Slovenes (1918–1929) Kingdom of Yugoslavia (1929–1943) See also: Republic of Prekmurje (1919) Banat, Bačka and Baranja (1918–1919) Free State of Fiume (1920–1924) (1924–1945) Italian province of Zadar (1920–1947)		Independent State of Croatia (1941–1945) Puppet state of Germany. Parts annexed by Italy. Međimurje and Baranja annexed by Hungary.	Democratic Federal Yugoslavia (1943–1945) Federal People's Republic of Yugoslavia (1945–1963) Socialist Federal Republic of Yugoslavia (1963–1992) Consisted of the Socialist Republics of: Slovenia (1945–1991); Croatia (1945–1991); Bosnia and Herzegovina (1945–1992) Serbia (1945–1992) (included the autonomous provinces of Vojvodina and Kosovo) Montenegro (1945–1992); Macedonia (1945–1991) See also: Free Territory of Trieste (1947–1954)^{h}			Republic of Croatia^{b} Croatian War of Independence			
Bosnia	Part of Austria-Hungary including the Bay of Kotor See also: Kingdom of Croatia-Slavonia (1868–1918) Kingdom of Dalmatia (1815–1918) Condominium of Bosnia and Herzegovina (1878–1918)	State of Slovenes, Croats and Serbs (1918) Kingdom of Serbs, Croats and Slovenes (1918–1929) Kingdom of Yugoslavia (1929–1943) See also: Republic of Prekmurje (1919) Banat, Bačka and Baranja (1918–1919) Free State of Fiume (1920–1924) (1924–1945) Italian province of Zadar (1920–1947)		Independent State of Croatia (1941–1945) Puppet state of Germany. Parts annexed by Italy. Međimurje and Baranja annexed by Hungary.	Democratic Federal Yugoslavia (1943–1945) Federal People's Republic of Yugoslavia (1945–1963) Socialist Federal Republic of Yugoslavia (1963–1992) Consisted of the Socialist Republics of: Slovenia (1945–1991); Croatia (1945–1991); Bosnia and Herzegovina (1945–1992) Serbia (1945–1992) (included the autonomous provinces of Vojvodina and Kosovo) Montenegro (1945–1992); Macedonia (1945–1991) See also: Free Territory of Trieste (1947–1954)^{h}			Bosnia and Herzegovina^{c} Bosnian War Consists of the Federation of Bosnia and Herzegovina (since 1995), Republika Srpska (since 1995), and Brčko District (since 2000).			
Herzegovina	Part of Austria-Hungary including the Bay of Kotor See also: Kingdom of Croatia-Slavonia (1868–1918) Kingdom of Dalmatia (1815–1918) Condominium of Bosnia and Herzegovina (1878–1918)	State of Slovenes, Croats and Serbs (1918) Kingdom of Serbs, Croats and Slovenes (1918–1929) Kingdom of Yugoslavia (1929–1943) See also: Republic of Prekmurje (1919) Banat, Bačka and Baranja (1918–1919) Free State of Fiume (1920–1924) (1924–1945) Italian province of Zadar (1920–1947)		Independent State of Croatia (1941–1945) Puppet state of Germany. Parts annexed by Italy. Međimurje and Baranja annexed by Hungary.	Democratic Federal Yugoslavia (1943–1945) Federal People's Republic of Yugoslavia (1945–1963) Socialist Federal Republic of Yugoslavia (1963–1992) Consisted of the Socialist Republics of: Slovenia (1945–1991); Croatia (1945–1991); Bosnia and Herzegovina (1945–1992) Serbia (1945–1992) (included the autonomous provinces of Vojvodina and Kosovo) Montenegro (1945–1992); Macedonia (1945–1991) See also: Free Territory of Trieste (1947–1954)^{h}			Bosnia and Herzegovina^{c} Bosnian War Consists of the Federation of Bosnia and Herzegovina (since 1995), Republika Srpska (since 1995), and Brčko District (since 2000).			
Vojvodina	Part of the Délvidék region of Hungary	State of Slovenes, Croats and Serbs (1918) Kingdom of Serbs, Croats and Slovenes (1918–1929) Kingdom of Yugoslavia (1929–1943) See also: Republic of Prekmurje (1919) Banat, Bačka and Baranja (1918–1919) Free State of Fiume (1920–1924) (1924–1945) Italian province of Zadar (1920–1947)		Autonomous Banat^{d} (part of the German; Territory of the Military Commander in Serbia)	Democratic Federal Yugoslavia (1943–1945) Federal People's Republic of Yugoslavia (1945–1963) Socialist Federal Republic of Yugoslavia (1963–1992) Consisted of the Socialist Republics of: Slovenia (1945–1991); Croatia (1945–1991); Bosnia and Herzegovina (1945–1992) Serbia (1945–1992) (included the autonomous provinces of Vojvodina and Kosovo) Montenegro (1945–1992); Macedonia (1945–1991) See also: Free Territory of Trieste (1947–1954)^{h}			Federal Republic of Yugoslavia Consisted of the Republic of Serbia (1992–2006) and Republic of Montenegro (1992–2006) Included Kosovo and Metohija, under UN administration, without control since 1999	State Union of Serbia and Montenegro Included Kosovo, under UN administration	Republic of Serbia Included the autonomous provinces of Vojvodina and Kosovo and Metohija under UN administration	Republic of Serbia Includes the autonomous province of Vojvodina; Kosovo claim
Central Serbia	Kingdom of Serbia (1882–1918)	State of Slovenes, Croats and Serbs (1918) Kingdom of Serbs, Croats and Slovenes (1918–1929) Kingdom of Yugoslavia (1929–1943) See also: Republic of Prekmurje (1919) Banat, Bačka and Baranja (1918–1919) Free State of Fiume (1920–1924) (1924–1945) Italian province of Zadar (1920–1947)		Territory of the Military Commander in Serbia (1941–1944) ^{e}	Democratic Federal Yugoslavia (1943–1945) Federal People's Republic of Yugoslavia (1945–1963) Socialist Federal Republic of Yugoslavia (1963–1992) Consisted of the Socialist Republics of: Slovenia (1945–1991); Croatia (1945–1991); Bosnia and Herzegovina (1945–1992) Serbia (1945–1992) (included the autonomous provinces of Vojvodina and Kosovo) Montenegro (1945–1992); Macedonia (1945–1991) See also: Free Territory of Trieste (1947–1954)^{h}			Federal Republic of Yugoslavia Consisted of the Republic of Serbia (1992–2006) and Republic of Montenegro (1992–2006) Included Kosovo and Metohija, under UN administration, without control since 1999	State Union of Serbia and Montenegro Included Kosovo, under UN administration	Republic of Serbia Included the autonomous provinces of Vojvodina and Kosovo and Metohija under UN administration	Republic of Serbia Includes the autonomous province of Vojvodina; Kosovo claim
Kosovo	Part of the Kingdom of Serbia (1912–1918)	State of Slovenes, Croats and Serbs (1918) Kingdom of Serbs, Croats and Slovenes (1918–1929) Kingdom of Yugoslavia (1929–1943) See also: Republic of Prekmurje (1919) Banat, Bačka and Baranja (1918–1919) Free State of Fiume (1920–1924) (1924–1945) Italian province of Zadar (1920–1947)		Mostly annexed by Italian Albania (1941–1944) along with western Macedonia and south-eastern Montenegro	Democratic Federal Yugoslavia (1943–1945) Federal People's Republic of Yugoslavia (1945–1963) Socialist Federal Republic of Yugoslavia (1963–1992) Consisted of the Socialist Republics of: Slovenia (1945–1991); Croatia (1945–1991); Bosnia and Herzegovina (1945–1992) Serbia (1945–1992) (included the autonomous provinces of Vojvodina and Kosovo) Montenegro (1945–1992); Macedonia (1945–1991) See also: Free Territory of Trieste (1947–1954)^{h}			Federal Republic of Yugoslavia Consisted of the Republic of Serbia (1992–2006) and Republic of Montenegro (1992–2006) Included Kosovo and Metohija, under UN administration, without control since 1999	State Union of Serbia and Montenegro Included Kosovo, under UN administration	Republic of Serbia Included the autonomous provinces of Vojvodina and Kosovo and Metohija under UN administration	Republic of Kosovo
Metohija	Kingdom of Montenegro (1910–1918) Metohija controlled by Austria-Hungary 1915–1918	State of Slovenes, Croats and Serbs (1918) Kingdom of Serbs, Croats and Slovenes (1918–1929) Kingdom of Yugoslavia (1929–1943) See also: Republic of Prekmurje (1919) Banat, Bačka and Baranja (1918–1919) Free State of Fiume (1920–1924) (1924–1945) Italian province of Zadar (1920–1947)		Mostly annexed by Italian Albania (1941–1944) along with western Macedonia and south-eastern Montenegro	Democratic Federal Yugoslavia (1943–1945) Federal People's Republic of Yugoslavia (1945–1963) Socialist Federal Republic of Yugoslavia (1963–1992) Consisted of the Socialist Republics of: Slovenia (1945–1991); Croatia (1945–1991); Bosnia and Herzegovina (1945–1992) Serbia (1945–1992) (included the autonomous provinces of Vojvodina and Kosovo) Montenegro (1945–1992); Macedonia (1945–1991) See also: Free Territory of Trieste (1947–1954)^{h}			Federal Republic of Yugoslavia Consisted of the Republic of Serbia (1992–2006) and Republic of Montenegro (1992–2006) Included Kosovo and Metohija, under UN administration, without control since 1999	State Union of Serbia and Montenegro Included Kosovo, under UN administration	Republic of Serbia Included the autonomous provinces of Vojvodina and Kosovo and Metohija under UN administration	Republic of Kosovo
Montenegro and Brda	Kingdom of Montenegro (1910–1918) Metohija controlled by Austria-Hungary 1915–1918	State of Slovenes, Croats and Serbs (1918) Kingdom of Serbs, Croats and Slovenes (1918–1929) Kingdom of Yugoslavia (1929–1943) See also: Republic of Prekmurje (1919) Banat, Bačka and Baranja (1918–1919) Free State of Fiume (1920–1924) (1924–1945) Italian province of Zadar (1920–1947)		Protectorate of Montenegro^{f} (1941–1944)	Democratic Federal Yugoslavia (1943–1945) Federal People's Republic of Yugoslavia (1945–1963) Socialist Federal Republic of Yugoslavia (1963–1992) Consisted of the Socialist Republics of: Slovenia (1945–1991); Croatia (1945–1991); Bosnia and Herzegovina (1945–1992) Serbia (1945–1992) (included the autonomous provinces of Vojvodina and Kosovo) Montenegro (1945–1992); Macedonia (1945–1991) See also: Free Territory of Trieste (1947–1954)^{h}			Federal Republic of Yugoslavia Consisted of the Republic of Serbia (1992–2006) and Republic of Montenegro (1992–2006) Included Kosovo and Metohija, under UN administration, without control since 1999	State Union of Serbia and Montenegro Included Kosovo, under UN administration	Montenegro	
Vardar Macedonia	Part of the Kingdom of Serbia (1912–1918)	State of Slovenes, Croats and Serbs (1918) Kingdom of Serbs, Croats and Slovenes (1918–1929) Kingdom of Yugoslavia (1929–1943) See also: Republic of Prekmurje (1919) Banat, Bačka and Baranja (1918–1919) Free State of Fiume (1920–1924) (1924–1945) Italian province of Zadar (1920–1947)		Annexed by the Kingdom of Bulgaria (1941–1944)	Democratic Federal Yugoslavia (1943–1945) Federal People's Republic of Yugoslavia (1945–1963) Socialist Federal Republic of Yugoslavia (1963–1992) Consisted of the Socialist Republics of: Slovenia (1945–1991); Croatia (1945–1991); Bosnia and Herzegovina (1945–1992) Serbia (1945–1992) (included the autonomous provinces of Vojvodina and Kosovo) Montenegro (1945–1992); Macedonia (1945–1991) See also: Free Territory of Trieste (1947–1954)^{h}			Republic of North Macedonia^{g}			
^{a} Prekmurje annexed by Hungary.; ^{b} See also: SAO Kninska Krajina (1990) → SAO Krajina (1990–1991); and SAO Eastern Slavonia, Baranja and Western Syrmia (1990–1991), SAO Western Slavonia (1990–1991) and the Republic of Serbian Krajina (1990–1995), all replaced by the UN Transitional Administration for Eastern Slavonia, Baranja and Western Sirmium (1996–1998).; ^{c} See also: Republic of Bosnia and Herzegovina; Croatian Republic of Herzeg-Bosnia; and the Serbian Autonomous Oblasts (SAOs) of Bosanska Krajina, North-East Bosnia, Romanija and Herzegovina (1991–1992), which all combined to form the Serbian Republic of Bosnia and Herzegovina (1992–1995).; ^{d} Bačka was reannexed by Hungary (1941–1944), while Syrmia was annexed by the Independent State of Croatia (1941–1944).; ^{e} Including North Kosovo. See also: Republic of Užice.; ^{f} Annexed by Italy (1941–1943) and Germany (1943–1944). Smaller part annexed by the Independent State of Croatia (1941–1944).; ^{g} North Macedonia's official and constitutional name was the Republic of Macedonia until 2019. It was known in the United Nations as the former Yugoslav Republic of Macedonia because of a naming dispute with Greece.; ^{h} Free Territory was established in 1947. Its administration was divided into two areas (Zone A) and (Zone B). Free Territory was de facto taken over by Italy and SFRY in 1954.
