= Toplice =

Toplice is a South Slavic word for spa and it may refer to:

- Dolenjske Toplice, town and a municipality in Slovenia near Novo Mesto
- Grand Hotel Toplice
- Istarske Toplice, thermal health resort in the central part of Istria, Croatia, 11 km southwest of Buzet (Pinguente)
- Krapinske Toplice, village and municipality in Krapina-Zagorje county in Croatia
- Medijske Toplice, spa located in the town of Izlake in central Slovenia
- Moravske Toplice, town and a municipality in Slovenia
- Rimske Toplice, a settlement in the Municipality of Laško in eastern Slovenia
- Šmarješke Toplice, town and a municipality in Slovenia
- Stubičke Toplice, village and municipality in Krapina-Zagorje county in Croatia
- Toplice, Croatia, village near Jastrebarsko
- Varaždinske Toplice, town in Croatia in Varaždin county

== See also ==
- Toplica (disambiguation)
