= Podlipovica =

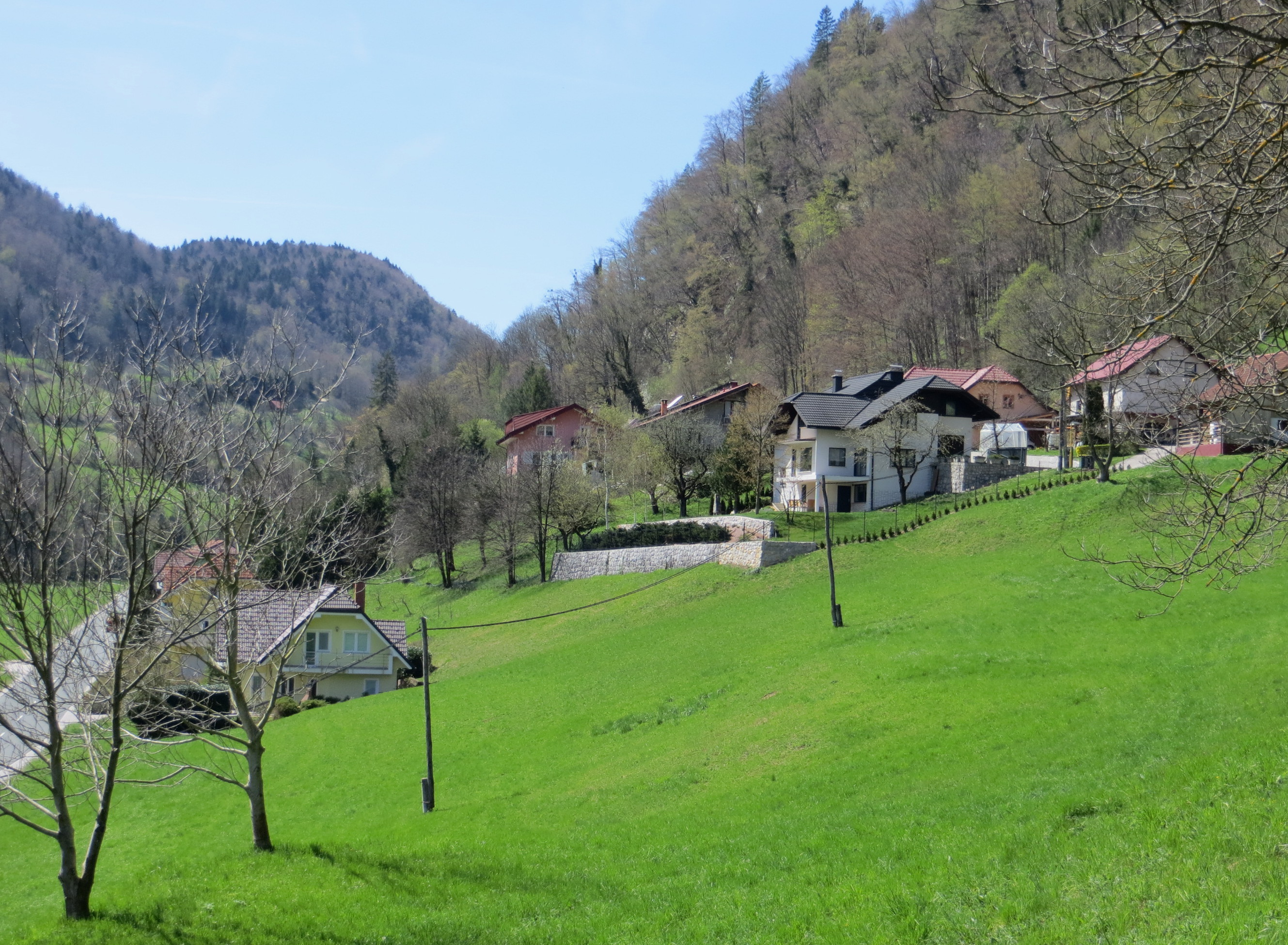

- Location in Slovenia
- Coordinates: 46°9′39.99″N 14°54′32.3″E
- Country: Slovenia
- Traditional region: Upper Carniola
- Statistical region: Central Sava
- Municipality: Zagorje ob Savi

Area
  - Total: 3.38 km^{2} (1.31 sq mi)
- Elevation: 417.3 m (1,369 ft)

Population (2002)
  - Total: 481
- Postal code: 1411

Podlipovica (pronounced [pɔˈdliːpɔʋitsa]) is a settlement immediately west of Izlake in the Municipality of Zagorje ob Savi in central Slovenia. The area is part of the traditional region of Upper Carniola. It is now included with the rest of the municipality in the Central Sava Statistical Region.

The ruins of Medija Castle and the restored castle chapel are located in the southern part of the settlement.

== Church ==
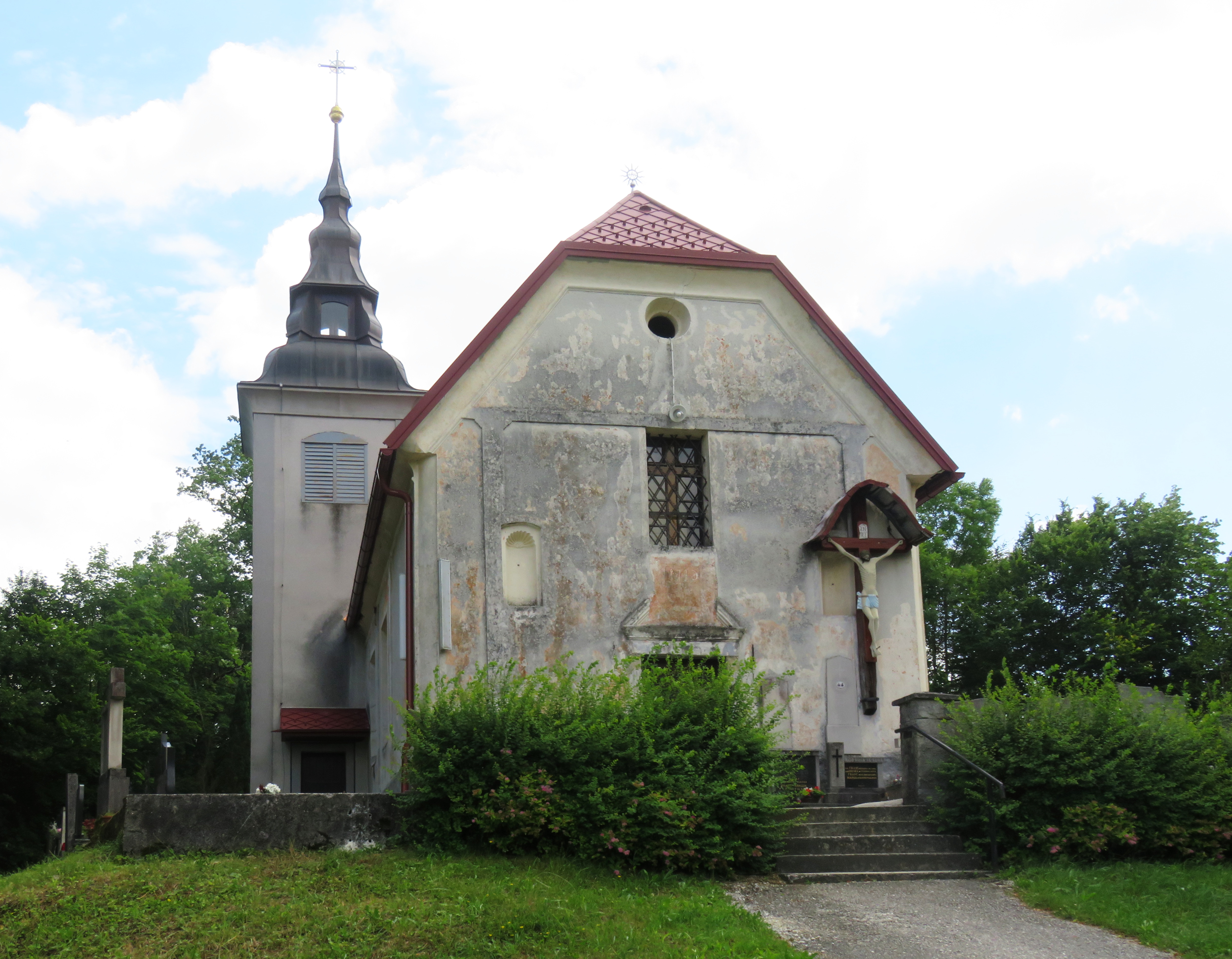
Saints Hermagoras and Fortunatus Church

The local church, built on a small hill east of the settlement core, is dedicated to Saints Hermagoras and Fortunatus and belongs to the Parish of Izlake. It dates to the late 17th century.
