= Toeplitz =

Toeplitz or Töplitz may refer to:

== Places ==
- Töplitz, the German name of Toplița, a city in Romania
- Toplița, Hunedoara, a commune in Romania
- Teplice (archaic German: Töplitz), Czech Republic

== People ==
- Jerzy Toeplitz (1909–1995), co-founder of the Polish Film School
- Kasper T. Toeplitz (born 1960), Polish-French composer
- Otto Toeplitz (1881–1940), German Jewish mathematician

== See also ==
- Dolenjske Toplice, a settlement in southeastern Slovenia
- Toeplitz matrix, a structured matrix with equal values along diagonals
- Toeplitz operator, the compression of a multiplication operator on the circle to the Hardy space
- Toeplitz algebra, the C*-algebra generated by the unilateral shift on the Hilbert space
- Toeplitz Hash Algorithm, used in many network interface controllers
- Hellinger–Toeplitz theorem, an everywhere defined symmetric operator on a Hilbert space is bounded
- Silverman–Toeplitz theorem, characterizing matrix summability methods which are regular
- Toplica (disambiguation)
- Toplița (disambiguation)
- Teplice (disambiguation)
