= Carniola =

Traditional region of Slovenia

Carniola Kranjska (Slovene) Krain (German)
- Historical region
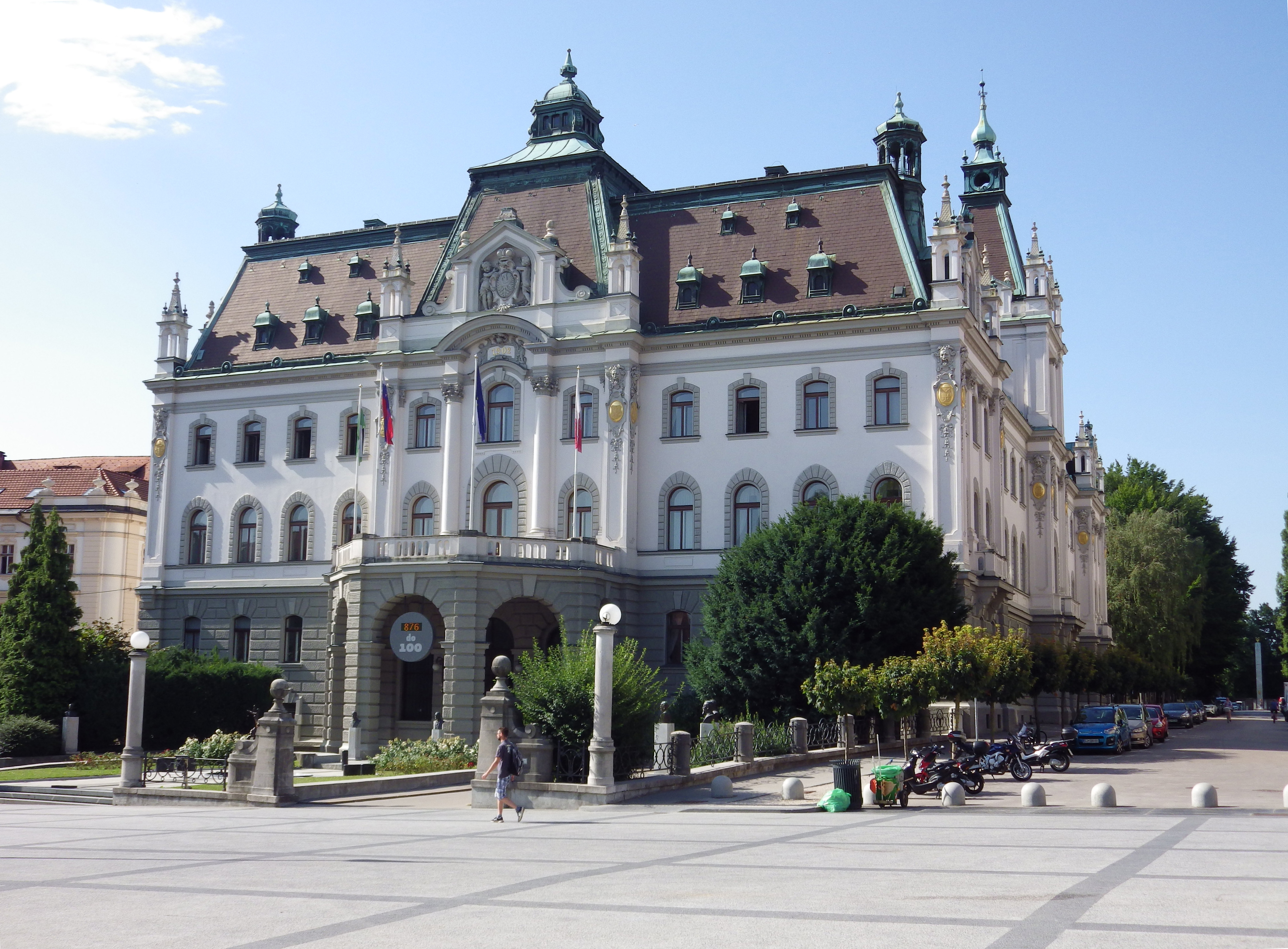
- The Carniolan Provincial Assembly Building in Ljubljana, also the seat of the Regional Committee and the Governor of the Duchy of Carniola, today the seat of the University of Ljubljana

- Flag Coat of arms

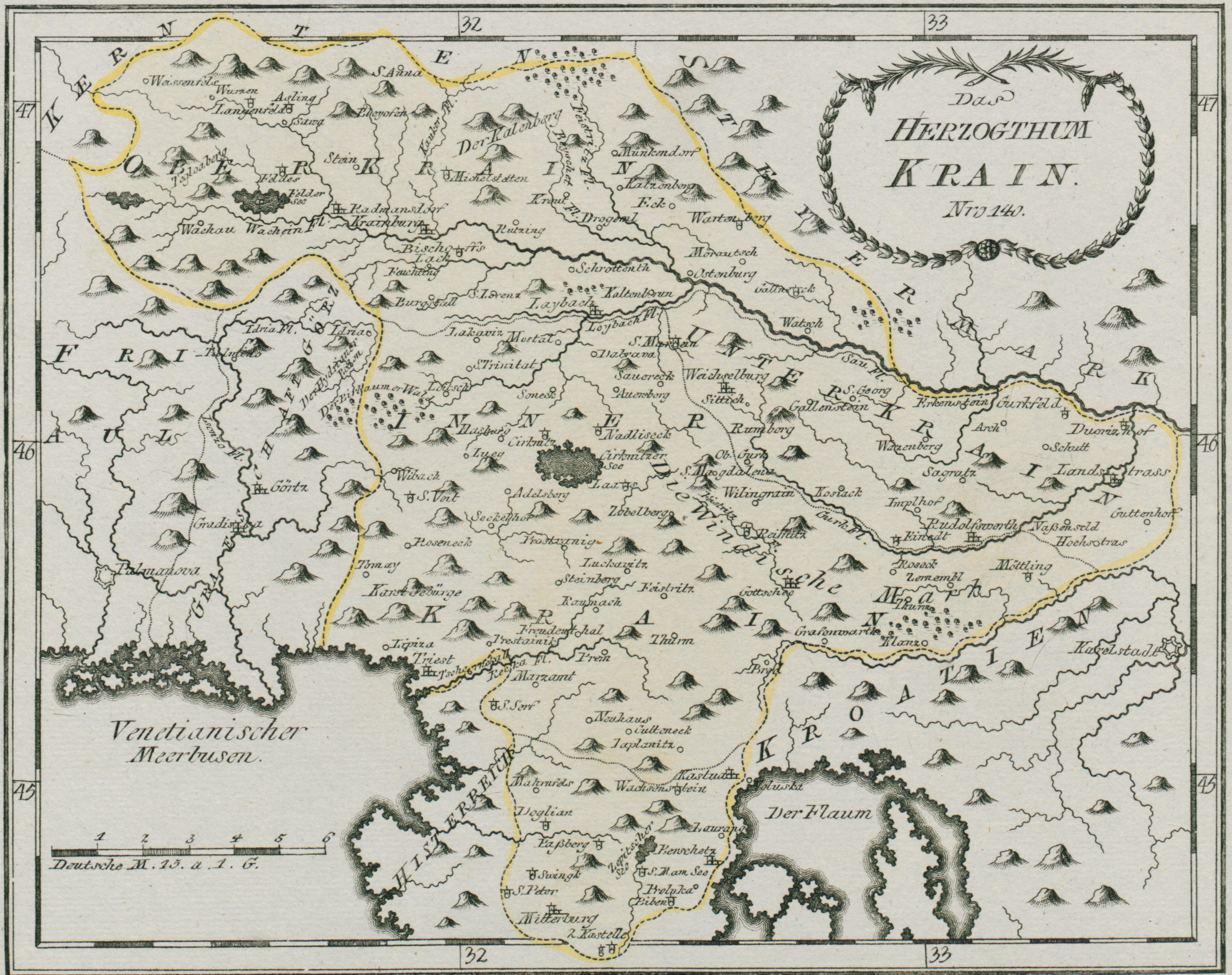
- 1791 map of Carniola
- Coordinates: 45.8808°N 14.0749°E
- Country: Slovenia
- Elevation: 400 m (1,300 ft)

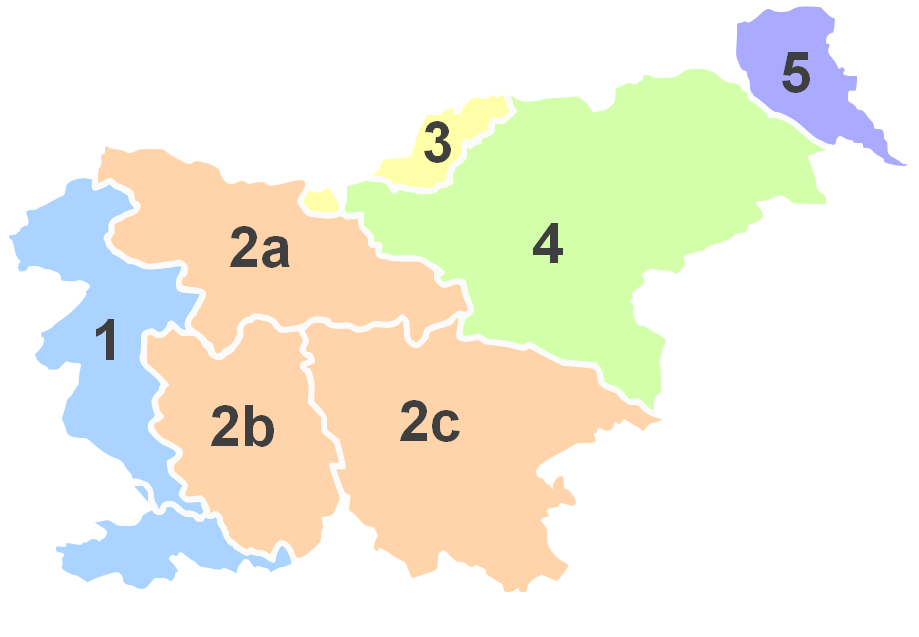
Traditional regions of Slovenia.: 1. Littoral; 2. Carniola: 2a Upper, 2b Inner, 2c Lower, 3 Carinthia, 4 Styria, 5 Prekmurje

Carniola (Slovene: Kranjska [ˈkɾàːnska]; German: Krain [kʁaɪn]; Italian: Carniola; Hungarian: Krajna) is a historical region that comprised parts of present-day Slovenia. Slovenes living within the former borders of the region still tend to identify with its traditional parts Upper Carniola, Lower Carniola (with the sub-part of White Carniola), and to a lesser degree Inner Carniola. In 1991, 47% of the population of Slovenia lived within the borders of the former Duchy of Carniola.

== Overview ==
The March of Carniola was a state of the Holy Roman Empire, established as an immediate territory in the 11th century. From the second half of the 13th century onward, it was ruled by the Habsburgs and its capital was Ljubljana (Laibach); previous overlords had their seats in Kranj (Krainburg) and Kamnik (Stein), which are therefore sometimes referred to as its earlier capitals. In the 14th century, the Duchy of Carniola was declared, a status which was formally recognised in the 16th century. As a hereditary possession of the Habsburgs (one of the so-called Erblande), Carniola was part of the Austrian Circle of the Empire from the early 16th century. Informally it was part of Inner Austria. It was subdivided into Upper, Lower, and Inner Carniola.

In 1804 it became part of the newly established Austrian Empire and in 1806 the Holy Roman Empire was dissolved. In 1809 it was ceded to the First French Empire, becoming part of the Illyrian Provinces; it was returned to Austria in 1815, forming part of the Kingdom of Illyria. In 1849 Illyria was dissolved and Carniola became a crown land in its own right; the three traditional subdivisions were also abolished. In 1867 it became part of Cisleithania, the Austrian part of Austria-Hungary. It remained so until 1918, when it seceded as part of the State of Slovenes, Croats and Serbs, becoming part of the Kingdom of Serbs, Croats and Slovenes (later Yugoslavia); it ceased to exist de jure with the passing of the Vidovdan Constitution in 1921.

Nowadays, its territory (in the extent at its dissolution) is almost entirely located in Slovenia, except for a small part in Italy, around Fusine in Valromana. (Note: In the extent at its dissolution.) Carniola in its final form, established in 1815, encompassed 9,904 km^{2} (3,824 sq mi). In 1914, before the beginning of World War I, it had a population of slightly under 530,000, of whom 95% were Slovenes.

== Geography ==
The region is crossed by the Julian Alps and the Karawanks. The highest mountain peaks are Nanos, 4,200 feet (1,300 m); Vremščica, 3,360 feet (1,020 m); Snežnik, 5,900 feet (1,800 m); and Triglav, 9,300 feet (2,800 m). The main rivers are the Sava, Tržič Bistrica, Kokra, Kamnik Bistrica, Sora, Ljubljanica, Mirna, Krka, and Kolpa rivers. Notable lakes include Black Lake (Slovene: Črno jezero), Lake Bohinj, Lake Bled, and Lake Cerknica. Nearby is the Ljubljana Marsh, and a series of hot and mineral springs which can be found at Dolenjske Toplice, Šmarješke Toplice, and Izlake.

Agriculture thrived more in Upper Carniola than in Lower Carniola. The Vipava Valley was especially famous for its wine and vegetables, and for its mild climate. The average temperature was 56 °F (13 °C) in spring, 77 °F (25 °C) in summer, 59 °F (15 °C) in autumn, and 26 °F (−3 °C) in winter.

In 1910 the main railroads were the Southern, Prince Rudolf, Bohinj, Kamnik, Lower Carniola, and Vrhnika railroads. The principal cities and towns in the region were Kamnik, Kranj, Tržič, Vrhnika, Vipava, Idrija, Turjak, Ribnica, Metlika, Novo Mesto, and Vače.

== History ==
=== Overview ===
After the fall of the Roman Empire, Lombards settled in Carniola, followed by Slavs around the sixth century AD. As a part of the Holy Roman Empire, the area was successively ruled by Bavarian, Frankish and local nobility, and eventually by the Austrian Habsburgs almost continuously from 1335 to 1918, though beset by many raids from the Ottomans and rebellions by local residents against Habsburg rule from the 15th to the 17th centuries. From about 900 AD until the 20th century, Carniola's ruling classes and urban areas spoke German, while the peasantry spoke Slovene.

The capital of Carniola, originally located at Kranj (German: Krainburg), was briefly moved to Kamnik (German: Stein) and finally to the current capital of Slovenia, Ljubljana (German: Laibach).

=== Chronology ===
- Fourth century: Germanic settlements of Herules (or Heruli).
- Fifth century: Germanic settlements of Langobards (or Lombards).
- Sixth century: Slavic settlements.
- Eighth century: Carniola a part of the Empire of Charlemagne.
- 10th century: Carniola a separate country.
- 1278: Death of Ottokar II of Bohemia. Carniola absorbed in the Habsburg dominions.
- 14th century: The province under Albert III.
- 15th–16th centuries: Ravages of the Ottomans.
- 1527–1564: Progress of the Reformation in Carniola.
- 1564: Death of Ferdinand I. Carniola under the Archduke Charles. Religious persecutions begin.
- 1763: Political administration of "Inner Austria" centralized at Graz.
- 1790: Accession of Leopold II. Partial revival of autonomy.
- 1797: First French invasion.
- 1805: Second French invasion.
- 1809: Treaty of Schönbrunn. Carniola under French rule.
- 1814: Congress of Vienna. Carniola restored to Austria.

=== Antiquity and Middle Ages ===
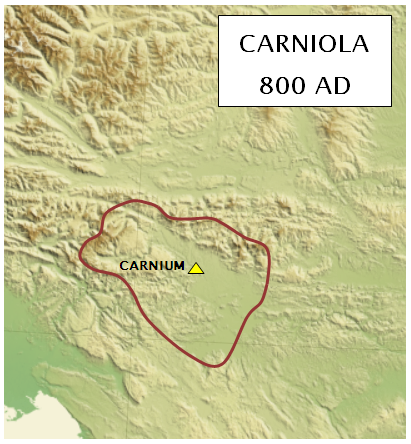
Old Slavic Carniola around 800 AD

Before the coming of the Romans (c. 200 BC), the Taurisci dwelt in the north of Carniola, the Pannonians in the southeast, the Iapodes or Carni, a Celtic tribe, in the southwest.

Carniola formed part of the Roman province of Pannonia; the northern part was joined to Noricum, the south-western and south-eastern parts and the city of Aemona to Venice and Istria. In the time of Augustus all the region from Aemona to the Kolpa River (Culpa) belonged to the province of Savia.

After the fall of the Western Roman Empire (476), Carniola was incorporated into Odoacer's Kingdom of Italy, and then in 493, under Theodoric, it formed part of the Ostrogothic Kingdom. Between the upper Sava and the Soča rivers lived the Carni, and towards the end of the sixth century Slavs settled the region called by Latin writers Carnia, or Carniola meaning 'little Carnia'; i.e., part of greater Carnia. The Latin name was later borrowed into Slavic, becoming Kranjska, and into German as Chrainmark, Krain.

The new inhabitants, to whom modern historiography frequently refers to as Alpine Slavs, were subjected to the Avars, but around 623 they joined the Slavic tribal union of Samo. After Samo's death in AD 658, they fell again under the Avar rule, but most probably enjoyed partial autonomy.

=== March of Carniola ===
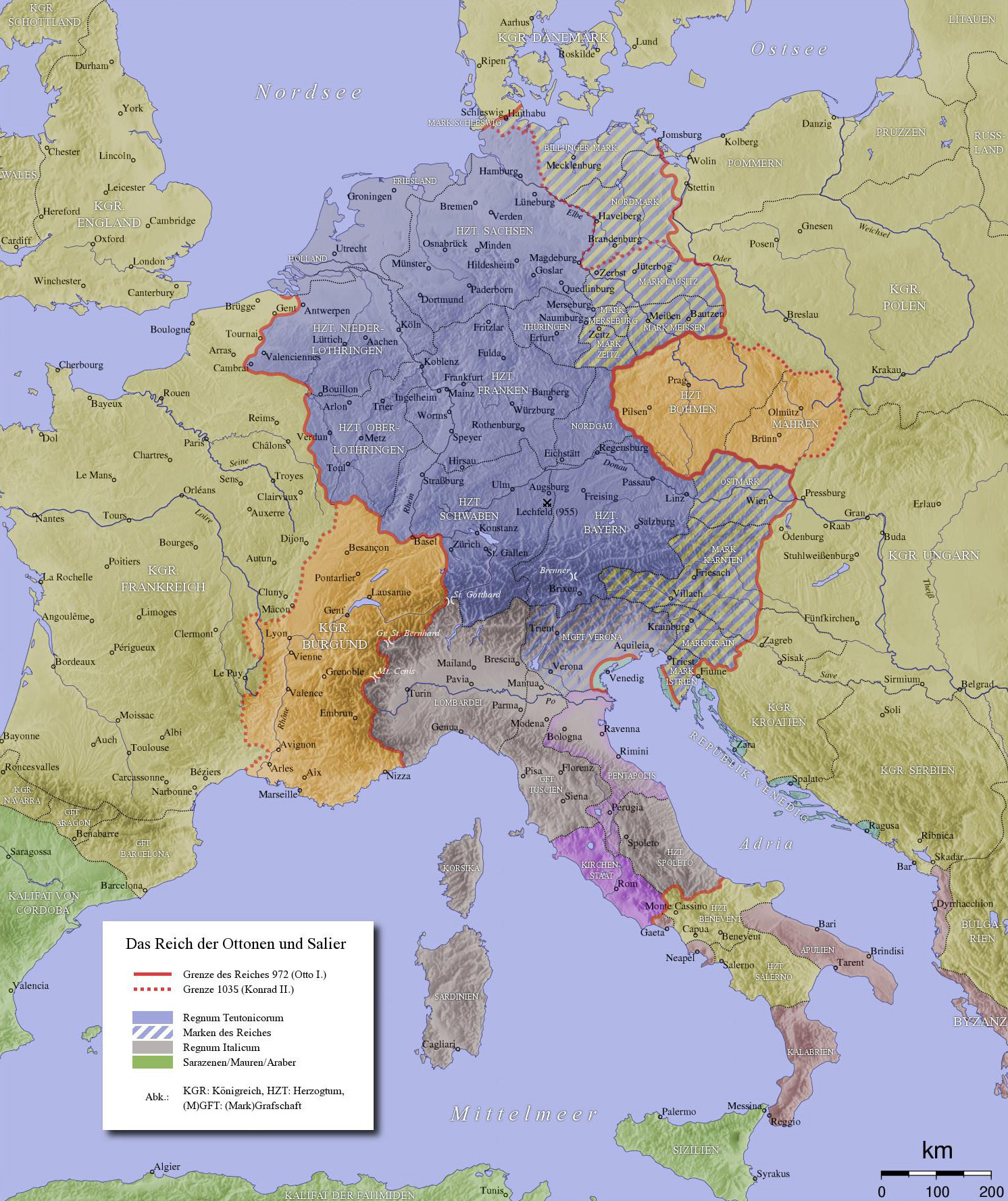
The Mark Krain (March of Carniola) was in the southeast of the 10th-century Holy Roman Empire. Its namesake and capital was Krainburg (now Kranj).

Carniola was governed by the Franks about the year 788, and was Christianized by missionaries from the Patriarchate of Aquileia and others. When Charlemagne established the margraviate of Friuli, he added to it a part of Carniola. After the division of Friuli, it became an independent margraviate, having its own Slavic margrave residing at Kranj, subject to the governor of Bavaria at first, and after 976 to the Dukes of Carinthia. Henry IV gave it to the Patriarch of Aquileia (1071) and it formed part of the Patriarchal State of Friuli.

Several sources from the High Middle Ages suggest that there was a common Carantanian (that is, Carinthian) identity that slowly vanished after the 14th century and was replaced by a regional Carniolan identity.

In the Middle Ages the Church held much property in Carniola, and thus in 974 in Upper and Lower Carniola the Bishop of Freising became in 974 a feudal lord of the town of Škofja Loka, the Bishop of Brixen held Bled and possessions in the Bohinj Valley, and the Bishop of Lavant received Mokronog.

Among secular potentates, the Dukes of Meran, Gorizia, Babenberg, and Zilli held possessions given to them in fief by the patriarchs of Aquileia. The dukes governed the province for nearly half a century.

Finally Carniola was given in fief with the consent of the patriarch to Frederick II of Austria, who obtained the title of duke in 1245. Frederick was succeeded by Ulrich III, Duke of Carinthia, who married Agnes of Andechs, a relative of the patriarch, and he endowed the churches and monasteries, established the government mint at the town of Kostanjevica, and finally (in 1268) willed to Ottokar II, King of Bohemia, all his possessions and the government of Carinthia and Carniola.

=== Duchy of Carniola ===
Coat of Arms of Duchy of Carniola.

Ottokar was defeated by Rudolph I of Germany, and at the meeting at Augsburg in 1282, he gave in fief to his sons Albrecht and Rudolf the province of Carniola, but it was leased to Meinhard, count of Gorizia-Tirol. Duke Henry of Carinthia claimed Carniola; and the Dukes of Austria asserted their claim as successors to the Bohemian kingdom. When Henry died in 1335, King John of Bohemia renounced his claims, and Albrecht, Duke of Austria, received Carniola; it was proclaimed a duchy by Rudolf IV, in 1364. Emperor Frederick III united Upper, Lower, and Central Carniola as Metlika and Pivka into one duchy. The union of the dismembered parts was completed by 1607.

=== French Intermezzo ===
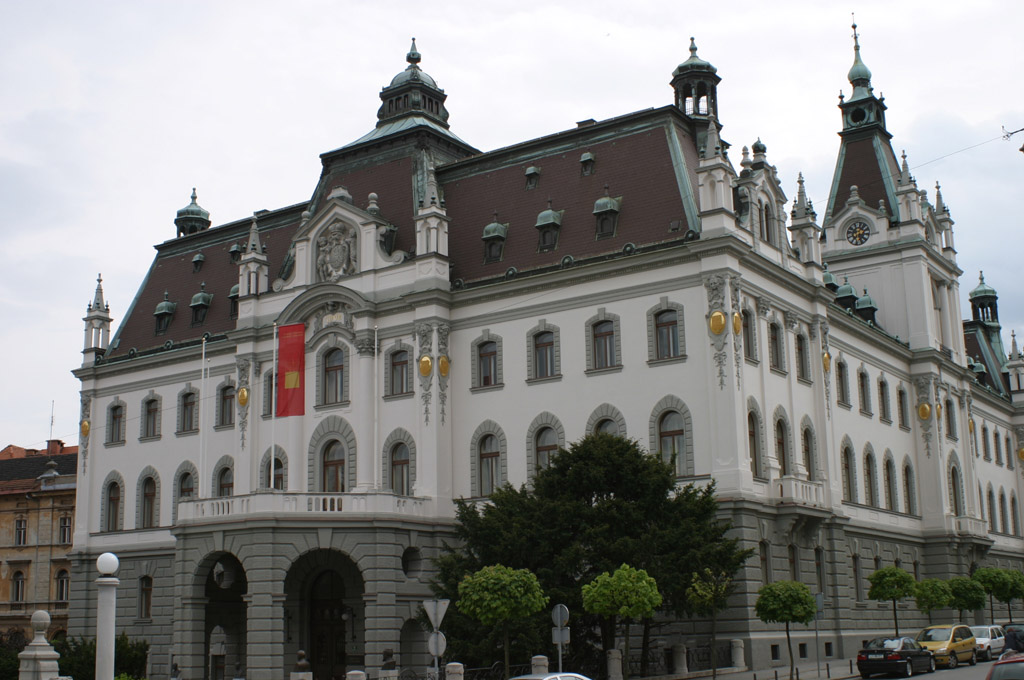
The Carniolan Parliament building. In 1919 it became the main building of the University of Ljubljana.

Carniola within Austria-Hungary (number 4).

French revolutionary troops occupied Carniola in 1797, and from 1805 to 1806. Under the Treaty of Vienna, Carniola became part of the Illyrian provinces of France (1809–1814), with Ljubljana as its capital, and Carniola formed a part of the new territory from 1809 to 1813. The defeat of Napoleon restored Carniola to Austrian Emperor Francis I, with larger boundaries, but at the extinction of the Illyrian Kingdom Carniola was confined to the limits outlined at the Congress of Vienna, 1815. From 1816 to 1849 Carniola was part of the Austrian Kingdom of Illyria with capital in Ljubljana.

=== Ecclesiastical history ===
In early Christian times the duchy was under the jurisdiction of the metropolitans of Aquileia (who became Patriarchs), Syrmium, and Salona. In consequence of the immigration of the pagan Slovenes, this arrangement was not a lasting one. After they had embraced Christianity in the seventh and eighth centuries Charlemagne conferred the major part of Carniola on the Patriarchate of Aquileia, and the remainder on the Diocese of Trieste. In 1100 that patriarchate was divided into five archdeaconries, of which Krain was one.

The diocese of Ljubljana or Laibach was established by Emperor Frederick III on 6 December 1461. It was directly subject to the pope. This was confirmed by a Bull of Pope Pius II, 10 September 1462. The new diocese consisted of part of Upper Carniola, two parishes in Lower Carniola, and a portion of Lower Styria and Carinthia; the remaining portion of Carniola was attached to Aquileia, later on to Gorizia and Trieste. At the redistribution of dioceses (1787 to 1791) not all the parishes in Carniola were included in the Diocese of Ljubljana, but this was accomplished in 1833, by taking two deaneries from the Diocese of Trieste, one from Gorizia, and one parish from the Diocese of Lavant, so as to include all the territory within the political boundaries of the crownland.

=== Austrian administration ===
The Austrian Empire reorganized the territory in 1849 as a duchy and a Cisleithanian crownland in Austria-Hungary known as the Duchy of Carniola. It was bounded on the north by Carinthia, on the north-east by Styria, on the south-east and south by Croatia, and on the west by Trieste, Goritza, and Istria; with area of 3,857 square miles (9,990 km^{2}) and population of 510,000. The capital, Ljubljana, was the see of a prince-bishop, population, 40,000; it was known to the Romans as Aemona, and was destroyed by Obri in the sixth century. Carniola was divided into Upper Carniola (Slovenian name: Gorenjska), Lower Carniola (Slovenian: Dolenjska), and Inner Carniola (Slovenian: Notranjska). Politically the province was divided into eleven districts consisting of 359 municipalities; the provincial capital was the residence of the imperial governor. The districts were: Kamnik, Kranj, Radovljica, the neighbourhood of Ljubljana, Logatec, Postojna, Litija, Krsko, Novo Mesto, Crnomelj, and Gotschee or Kocevje. There were 31 judicial circuits.

The duchy was constituted by rescript of 20 December 1860, and by imperial patent of 26 February 1861, modified by legislation of 21 December 1867, granting power to the home parliament to enact all laws not reserved to the imperial diet, at which it was represented by eleven delegates, of whom two elected by the landowners, three by the cities, towns, commercial and industrial boards, five by the village communes, and one by a fifth curia by secret ballot, every duly registered male twenty-four years of age has the right to vote. The home legislature consisted of a single chamber of thirty-seven members, among whom the prince-bishop sits ex-officio. The emperor convened the legislature, and it is presided over by the governor. The landed interests elected ten members, the cities and towns eight, the commercial and industrial boards two, the village communes sixteen. In 1907, instead of these rules, universal and equal suffrage for all men was introduced. The business of the chamber was restricted to legislating on agriculture, public and charitable institutions, administration of communes, church and school affairs, the transportation and housing of soldiers in war and during manoeuvres, and other local matters. The land budget of 1901 amounted to 3,573,280 crowns ($714,656).

=== Modern era ===
In 1918, the duchy ceased to exist and its territory became part of the newly formed State of Slovenes, Croats and Serbs and subsequently part of the Kingdom of Serbs, Croats and Slovenes (later known as the Kingdom of Yugoslavia). The western part of the duchy, with the towns of Postojna, Ilirska Bistrica, Idrija, and Šturje, was annexed to Italy in 1920, but was subsequently also included in Yugoslavia in 1947. Since 1991, the region has been part of an independent Slovenia.

== See also ==
- Battle of Sisak
- Duchy of Carniola
- Flag of Slovenia
- The Glory of the Duchy of Carniola—Encyclopedia
- History of Slovenia
- Inner Austria
- Johann Weikhard von Valvasor
- March of Carniola
