= Teplice (disambiguation) =

Teplice is a city in the Ústí nad Labem Region, Czech Republic.

Teplice may also refer to places in the Czech Republic:

- Teplice District, a district
- Teplice nad Metují, a town in Hradec Králové Region
- Teplice nad Bečvou, a town in the Olomouc Region

== See also ==
- Toeplitz (disambiguation)
- Toplița (disambiguation)
- Turčianske Teplice, Slovakia
