= Toplița (disambiguation) =

Toplița is a city in Harghita County, Romania.

Toplița may also refer to:

== Populated places in Romania ==
- Toplița, Hunedoara, a commune in Hunedoara County
- Toplița, a village in Mălureni Commune, Argeș County
- Toplița, a village in Letca Commune, Sălaj County
- Toplița Mureșului and Măgura-Toplița, villages in Certeju de Sus Commune, Hunedoara County

== Rivers in Romania ==
- Toplița, a tributary of the Barcău in Sălaj County
- Toplița, a tributary of the Bârsa in Brașov County
- Toplița, a tributary of the Comarnic in Caraș-Severin County
- Toplița, a tributary of the Fișag in Harghita County
- Toplița, a tributary of the Jiul de Vest in Hunedoara County
- Toplița, another name for the Topolița, a tributary of the Moldova in Neamț County
- Toplița (Mureș), a tributary of the Mureș in Harghita County
- Toplița, a tributary of the Sucevița in Suceava County
- Toplița, a tributary of the Măcicaș in Caraș-Severin County
- Toplița (Vâlsan), a tributary of the Vâlsan in Argeș County

== See also ==
- Toeplitz (disambiguation)
- Toplica (disambiguation)
- Teplice (disambiguation)
