= Medija Castle =

Settlement in Slovenia

Coordinates: 46°8′54.5″N 14°55′22.05″E

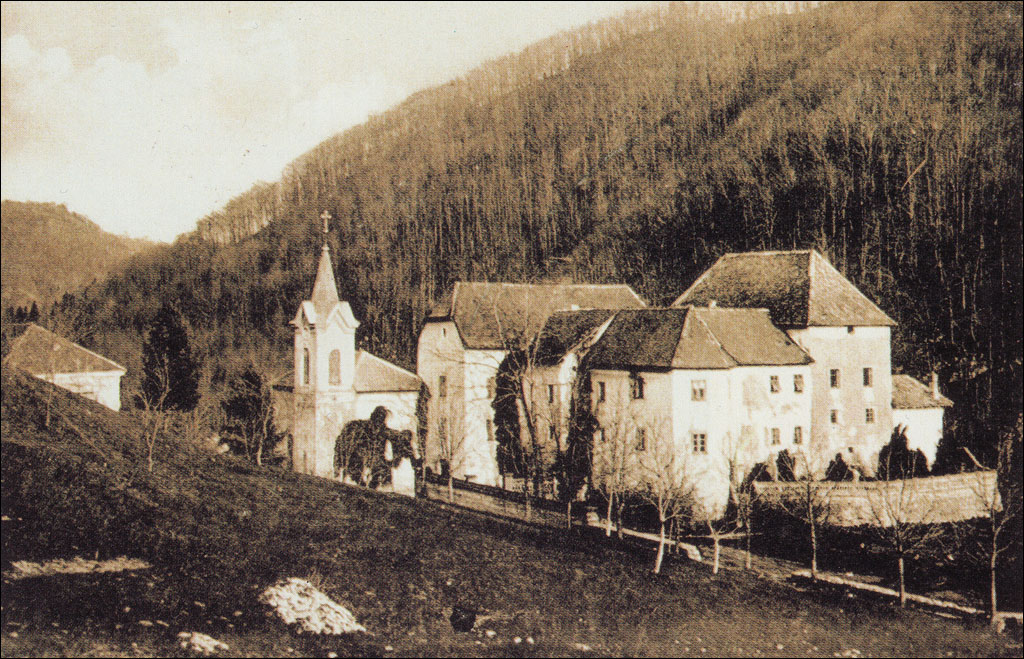
Medija Castle in the early 20th century

Medija Castle (Slovene: Medijski grad, Grad Medija, German: Schloss Gallenegg) is a castle ruin located in the southern part of the settlement of Podlipovica, west of Izlake, in the Municipality of Zagorje ob Savi, central-eastern Slovenia. The castle and its stables were destroyed by the Yugoslav Partisans during World War II. The castle chapel was later restored and now serves as a venue for plays, concerts, and other cultural events, as well as weddings.

The castle is best known as the supposed resting place of the polymath Johann Weikhard von Valvasor (Slovene: Janez Vajkard Valvasor), whose parents owned the estate, and who also spent his childhood at the castle.

== Gallery ==
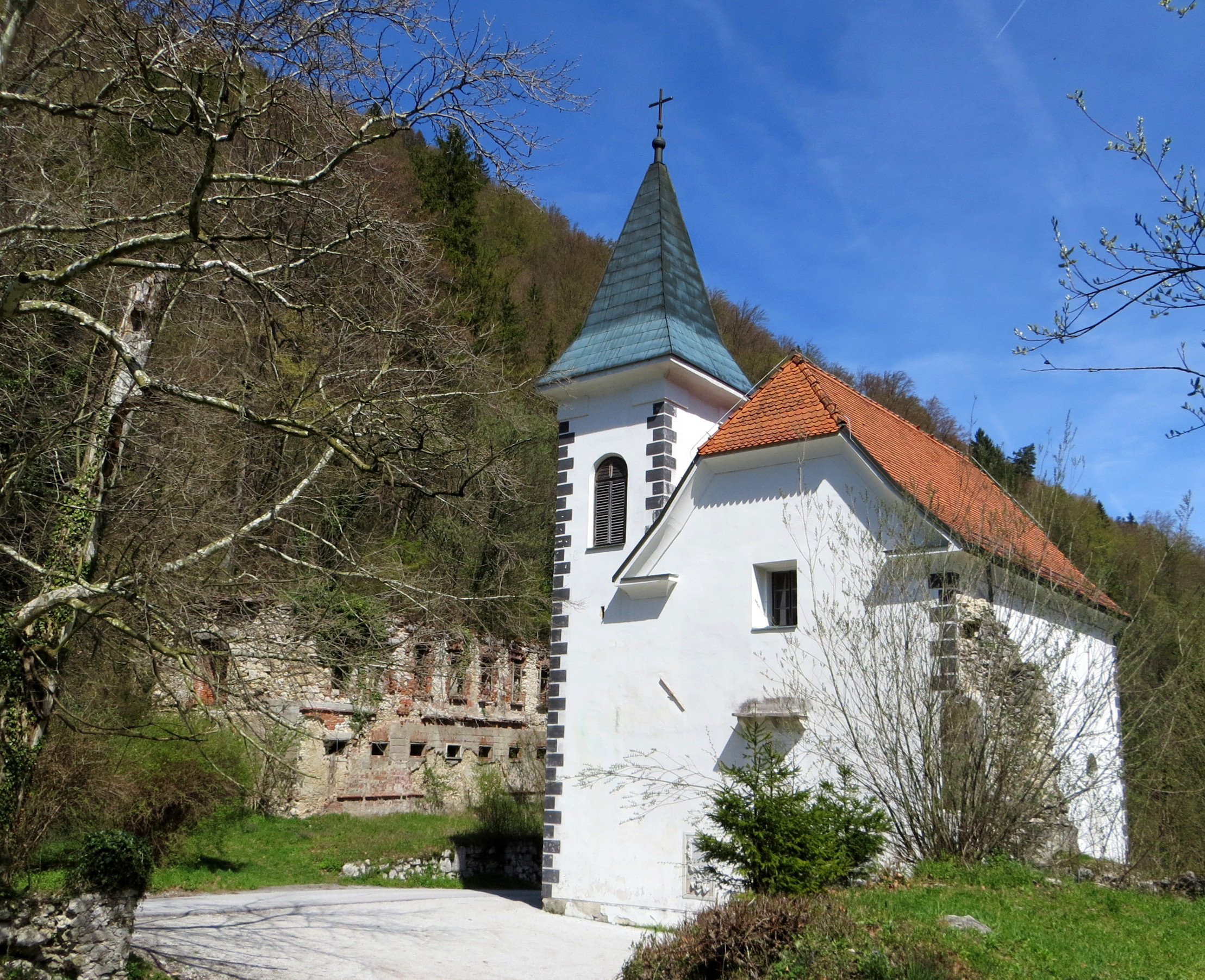
Restored castle chapel

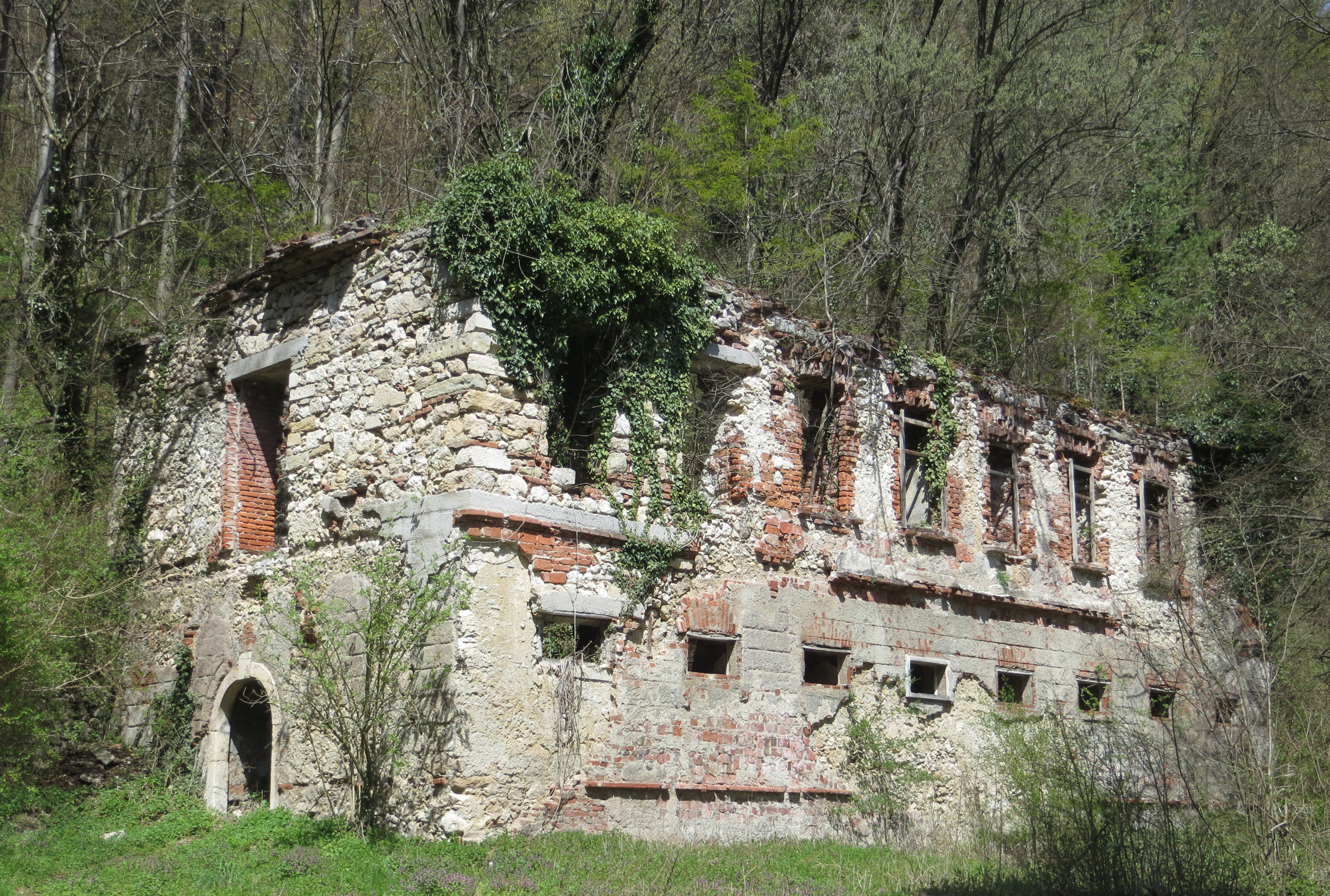
Castle stable ruins

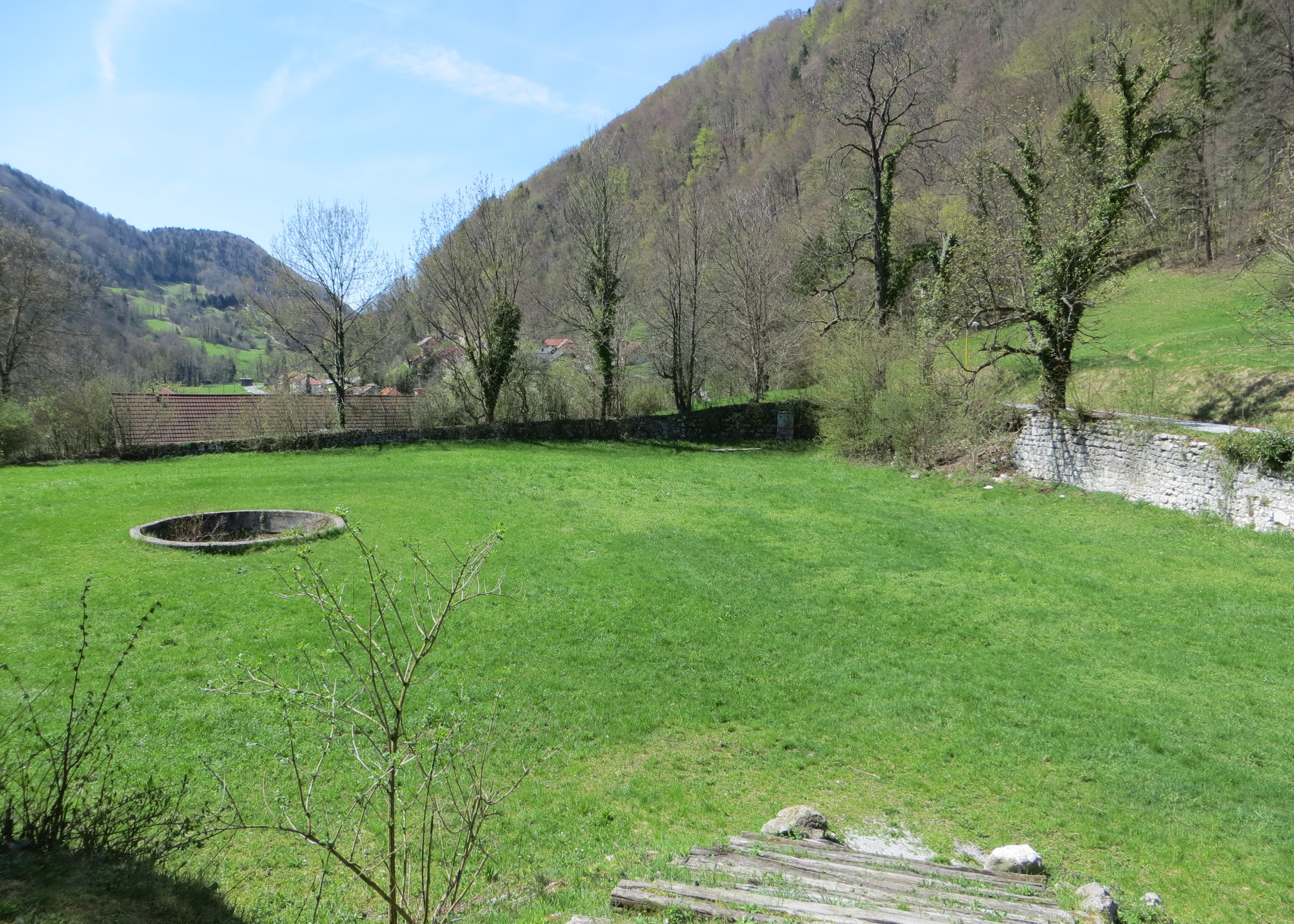
Castle courtyard
