= Čemšenik =

- Village
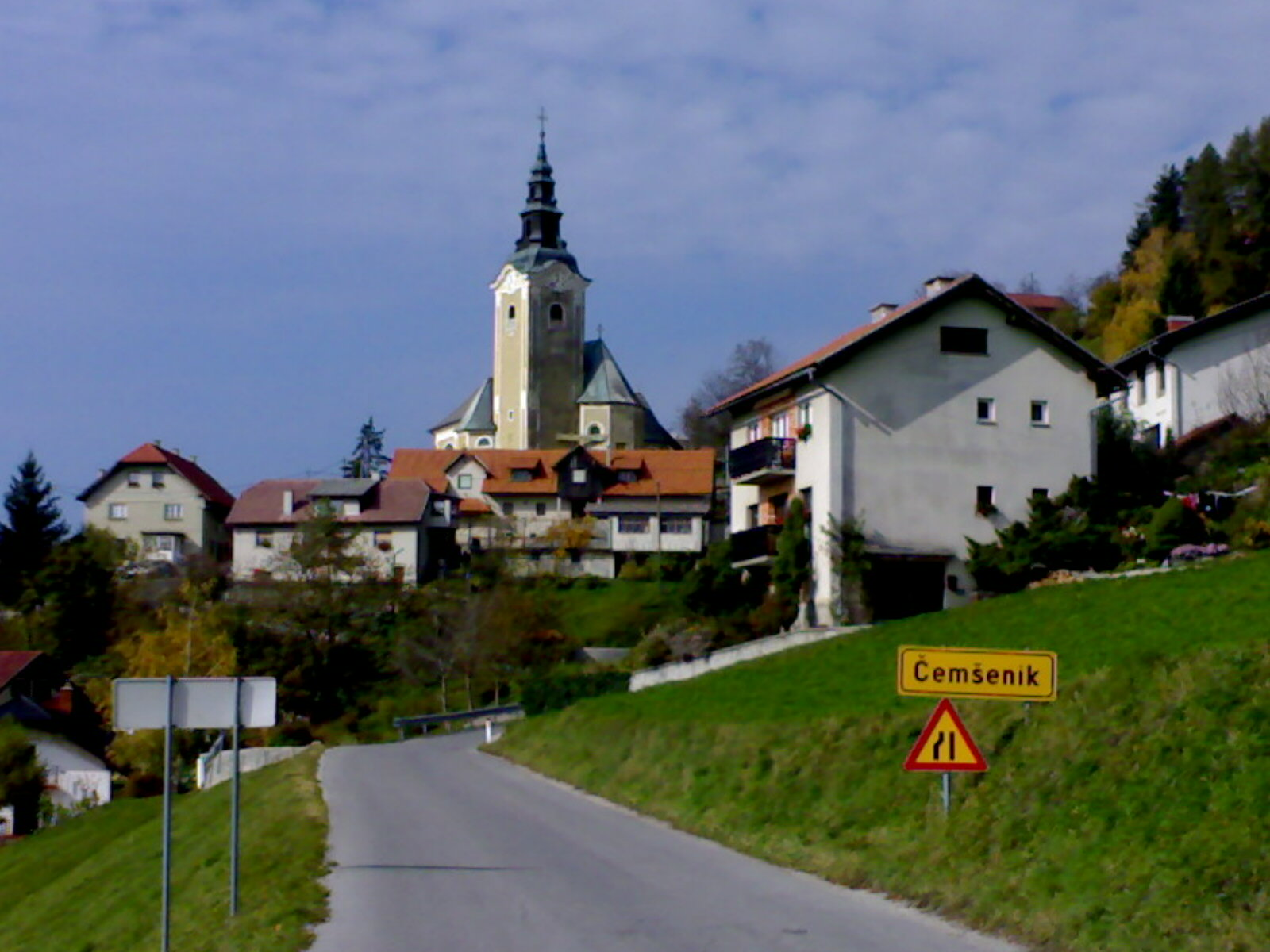

- Location in Slovenia
- Coordinates: 46°10′47.44″N 14°56′38.09″E
- Country: Slovenia
- Traditional region: Upper Carniola
- Statistical region: Central Sava
- Municipality: Zagorje ob Savi

Area
  - Total: 2.28 km^{2} (0.88 sq mi)
- Elevation: 630.5 m (2,069 ft)

Population (2002)
  - Total: 223
- Postal code: 1413

Čemšenik (pronounced [tʃɛmʃɛˈniːk]; German: Tschemschenik) is a village north of Izlake in the Municipality of Zagorje ob Savi in central Slovenia. The area is part of the traditional region of Upper Carniola. It is now included with the rest of the municipality in the Central Sava Statistical Region.

== Name ==
Čemšenik was attested in historical sources as Czremssenich in 1330, Schremsnikg in 1421, Zremsenikh in 1478, and Tschremsenikg in 1496, among other spellings. The name is derived from the common noun čremsa 'bird cherry', referring to the local vegetation.

== Church ==
The parish church in the settlement is dedicated to the Assumption of Mary (Slovene: Marijino vnebovzetje) and belongs to the Roman Catholic Archdiocese of Ljubljana. It was first mentioned in written documents dating to the 13th century, but the current building dates to the 17th-century rebuilding with early 19th-century alterations.
