= Toplica, Vrapčište =

Toplica Топлица Toplicë
- Village
- Location within North Macedonia
- Coordinates: 41°51′30″N 20°53′17″E
- Country: North Macedonia
- Region: Polog
- Municipality: Vrapčište

Population (2021)
  - Total: 918
- Time zone: UTC+1 (CET)
  - Summer (DST): UTC+2 (CEST)
- Car plates: GV
- Website: .

Toplica (Macedonian: Топлица, Albanian: Toplicë) is a village in the municipality of Vrapčište, North Macedonia.

== Demographics ==
Toplica is attested in the 1467/68 Ottoman tax registry (defter) for the Nahiyah of Kalkandelen. The village had a total of 28 Muslim households, 1 bachelor and 6 widows.

As of the 2021 census, Toplica had 918 residents with the following ethnic composition:

- Albanians 882
- Persons for whom data are taken from administrative sources 36

According to the 2002 census, the village had a total of 1,274 inhabitants. Ethnic groups in the village include:

- Albanians 1,267
- Bosniaks 1
- Others 6

According to the 1942 Albanian census, Toplica was inhabited by 478 Muslim Albanians.

In statistics gathered by Vasil Kanchov in 1900, the village of Toplica was inhabited by 120 Muslim Albanians.
