= Toplița (Mureș) =

Toplița Lomaș, Hungarian: Lomás
- Location within Romania

Location
- Country: Romania
- Counties: Harghita County
- Towns: Toplița

Physical characteristics
- Source: Mount Cocoșul
  - location: Călimani Mountains
- Mouth: Mureș
  - location: Toplița
  - coordinates: 46.923°N 25.349°E
- Length: 29 km (18 mi)
- Basin size: 215 km^{2} (83 sq mi)

Basin features
- Progression: Mureș→ Tisza→ Danube→ Black Sea
- Tributaries
  - left: Voivodeasa

The Toplița (also: Lomaș, Hungarian: Lomás-patak) is a river in the Călimani Mountains, Harghita County, central Romania. It is a right tributary of the river Mureș. It joins the Mureș in the town Toplița. It is fed by several smaller streams, including Puturosu, Purcelu, Voivodeasa, Hurdugașu, Pârâul Sec and Fagul Rusului. Its length is 29 km (18 mi) and its basin size is 215 km^{2} (83 sq mi).
