= Toplica =

Toplica may refer to:

== Places ==
Bosnia and Herzegovina

- Toplica (Kiseljak), a village in Bosnia and Herzegovina
- Toplica (Srebrenica), a village in Bosnia and Herzegovina

Croatia

- Toplica (Ilova), a river in central-eastern Croatia

North Macedonia

- Toplica, Prilep, a village in North Macedonia
- Toplica, Vrapčište, a settlement in Vrapčište Municipality, North Macedonia

Romania

- Toplica, the Hungarian name for Topliţa Mureşului village, Certeju de Sus Commune, Hunedoara County, Romania

Serbia

- Toplica (South Morava), a river in southern Serbia
- Toplica (region), a region in Serbia around the Toplica River
- Toplica District
- Toplica (Kolubara), a river in western Serbia

== People ==
- Milan Toplica (died 1389), Serbian knight
- Toplica Spasojević (born 1956), Serbian football official

== See also ==
- Toplice (disambiguation)
- Toplița (disambiguation)
- Toplitsa, the former name of Hisarya, Bulgaria
- Toplitsa, one of the caves near Kunino, Bulgaria
- Toplitsas, a tributary to the Moglenitsas, Greece
