= Voivodeasa =

- Location within Romania

Location
- Country: Romania
- Counties: Harghita County

Physical characteristics
- Source: Călimani Mountains
- Mouth: Toplița
  - coordinates: 47.0315°N 25.3607°E
- Length: 13 km (8.1 mi)
- Basin size: 53 km^{2} (20 sq mi)

Basin features
- Progression: Toplița→ Mureș→ Tisza→ Danube→ Black Sea
- Tributaries
  - left: Toplicioara, Crucea

The Voivodeasa (Hungarian: Vajada) is a left tributary of the river Toplița in Romania. Its length is 13 km (8.1 mi) and its basin size is 53 km^{2} (20 sq mi).
