= Medija Thermal Spa =

Spa in Izlake, Slovenia

Coordinates: 46°9′27.32″N 14°55′30.72″E

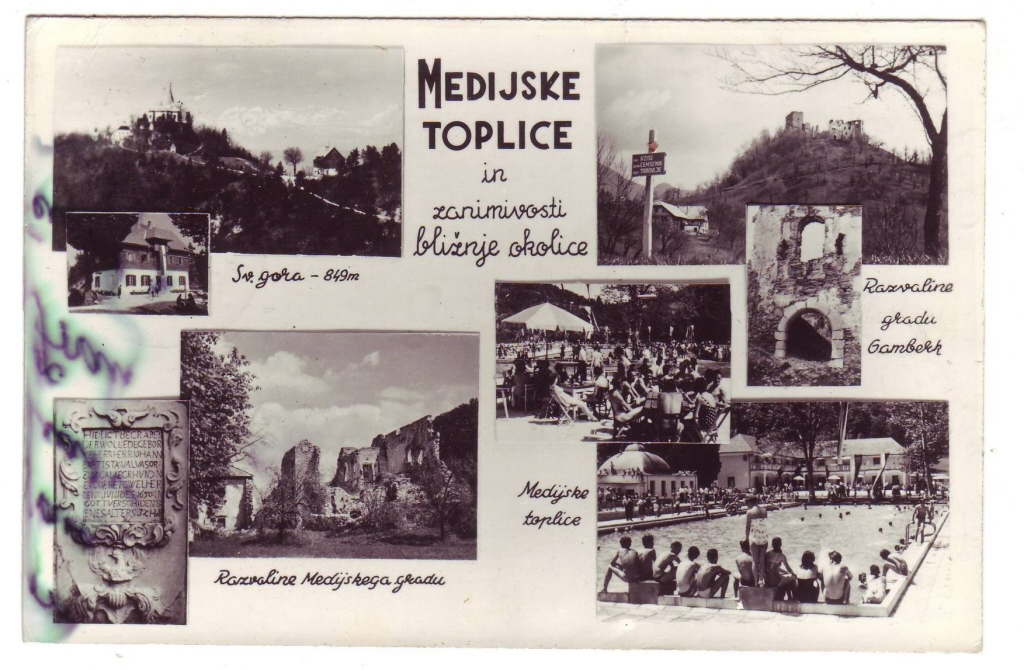
A postcard showing the spa and other sights of the local area

The Medija Thermal Spa (Slovene: Medijske toplice) is a spa located in the town of Izlake in central Slovenia.

== Establishment and early history ==
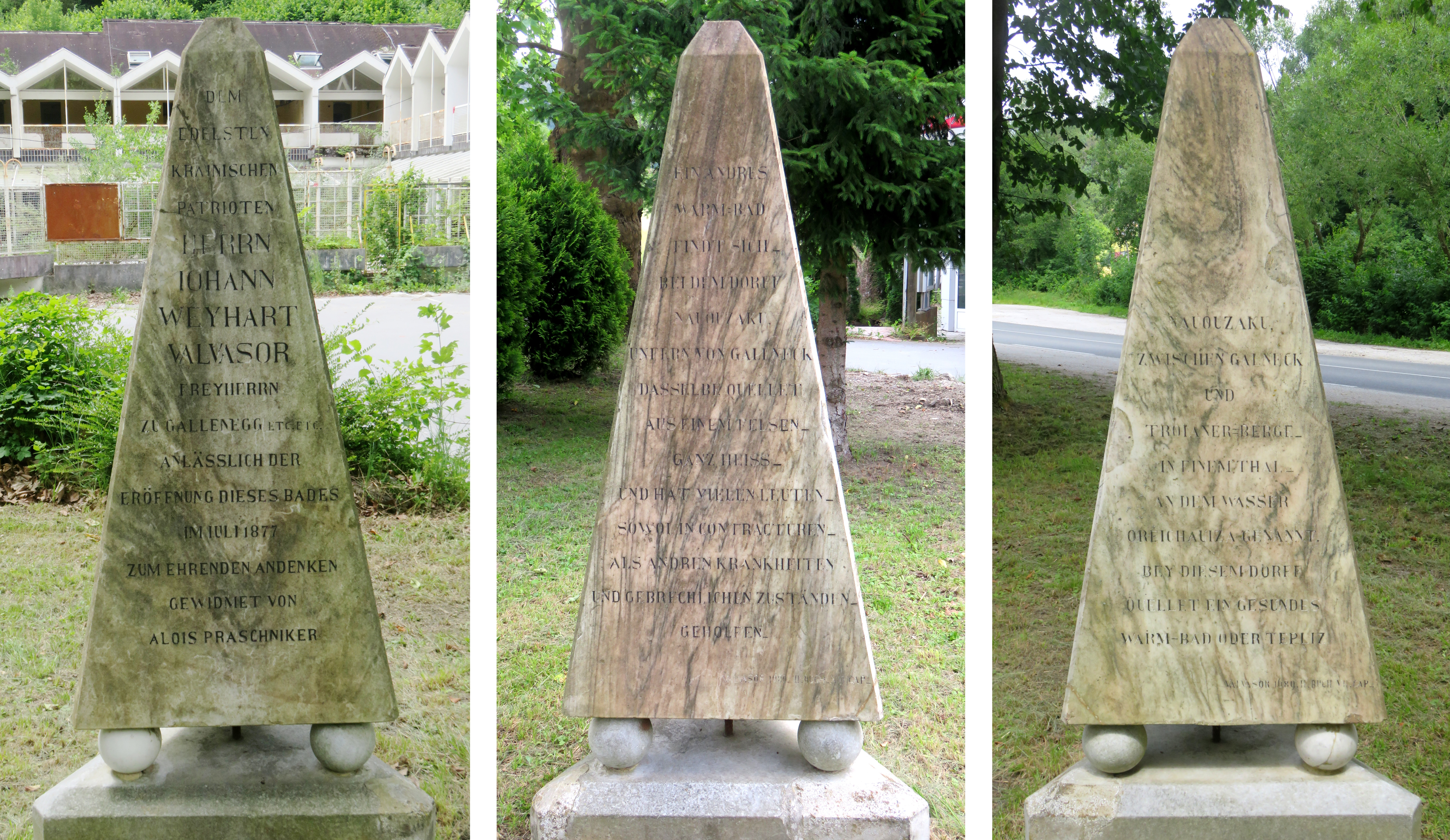
Monument to Johann Weikhard von Valvasor

The spa was established in 1877 by the local businessman Alois Praschniker, although thermal baths at the location were already mentioned by Johann Weikhard von Valvasor in his The Glory of the Duchy of Carniola in the 17th century. Praschniker installed a monument at the spa commemorating Valvasor in 1877.

== Later history ==
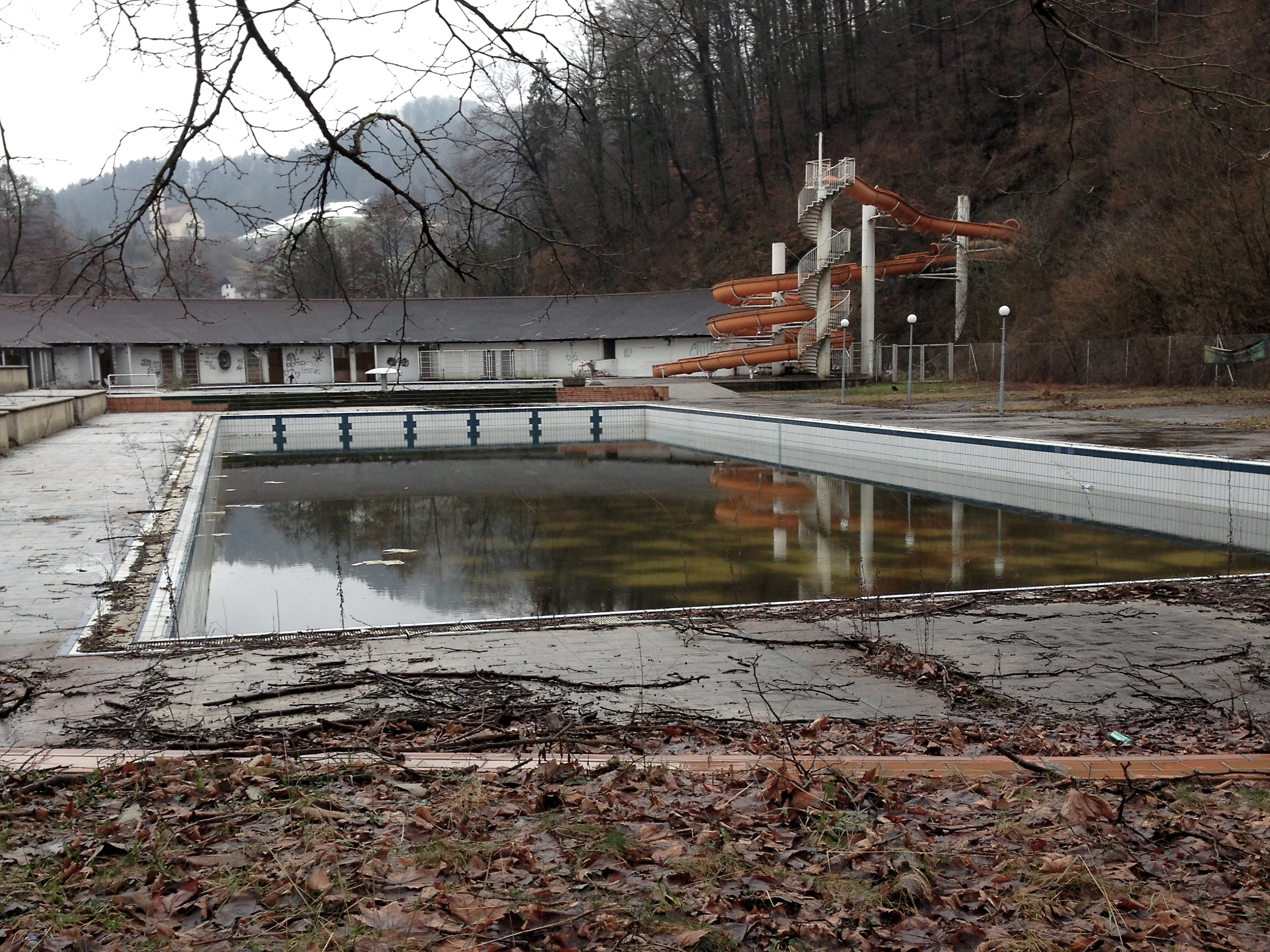
The outdoor pool in April 2013

In the second half of the 20th century, the complex was gradually expanded: by 2009 the spa consisted of a hotel, an indoor swimming pool, and an outdoor swimming pool. Since 2009, both the hotel and the outdoor swimming pool have been closed and have been subject to rapid deterioration, caused by a lack of maintenance and vandalism, as well as weather-caused damage, mainly flooding in 2010. In 2013, a civil initiative started a clean-up and restoration of the outdoor pool with the purpose of opening it for the local community. A series of clean-ups was organized mainly on Saturdays as well as a photographic exhibition showing the history of the spa.
