= Izlake =

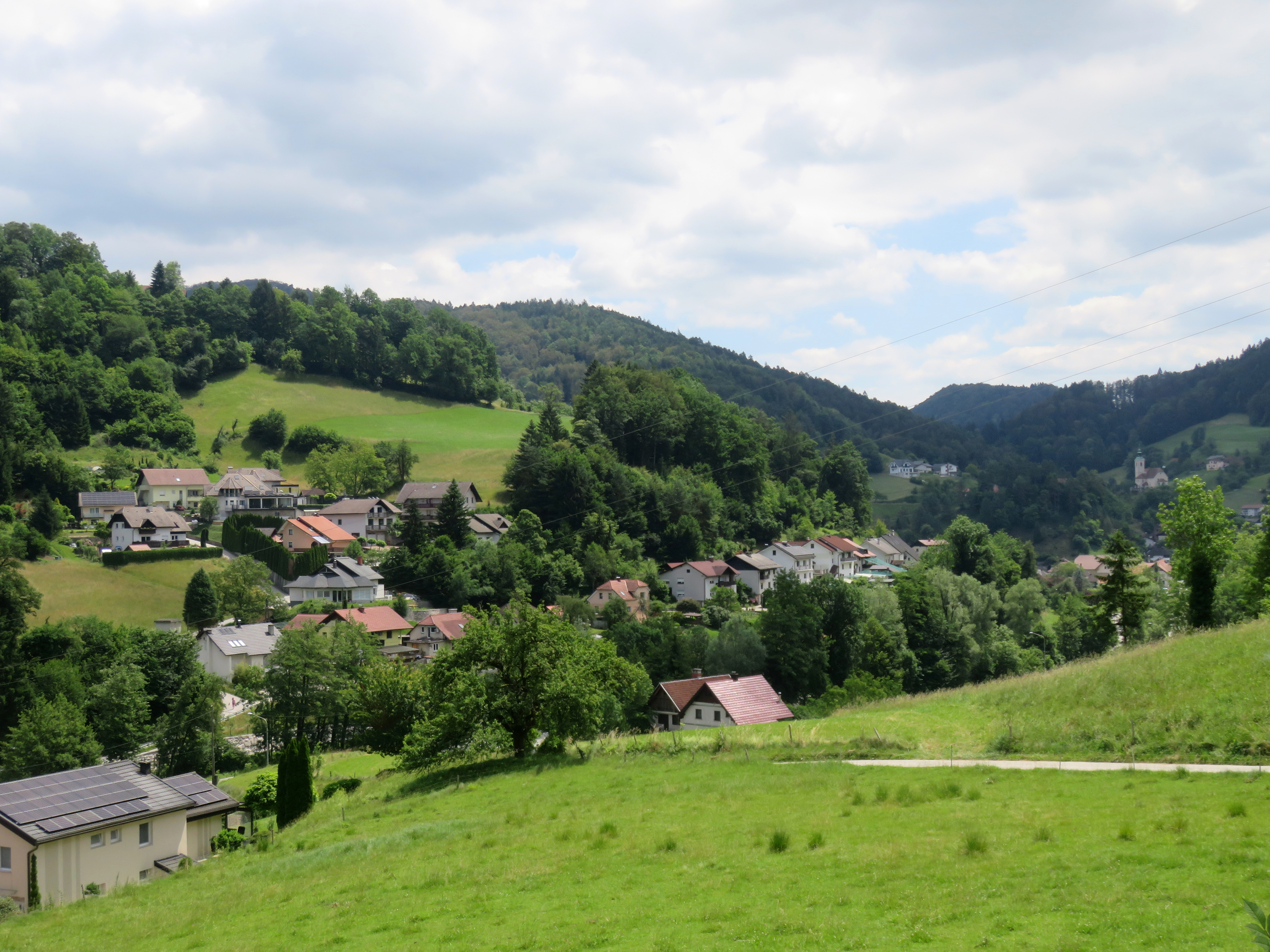

- Location in Slovenia
- Coordinates: 46°9′9.17″N 14°53′38.29″E
- Country: Slovenia
- Traditional region: Upper Carniola
- Statistical region: Central Sava
- Municipality: Zagorje ob Savi

Area
  - Total: 3.44 km^{2} (1.33 sq mi)
- Elevation: 351.4 m (1,153 ft)

Population (2002)
  - Total: 1,146
- Postal code: 1411
- Website: https://www.izlake.si/

Izlake (pronounced [iˈzlaːkɛ]; German: Islak) is a settlement in the Municipality of Zagorje ob Savi in the Central Sava Valley, central Slovenia. The area is part of the traditional region of Upper Carniola. It is now included with the rest of the municipality in the Central Sava Statistical Region.

== Tourism ==
Izlake is best known for the currently (as of June 2023) defunct Medijske Toplice thermal baths and has been the tourism centre of the region. Other attractions include mostly outdoor activities such as hiking to surrounding peaks as well as some cultural heritage sights, most notably Medija Castle, where the renowned Slovene polymath Johann Weikhard von Valvasor spent his childhood and is most likely buried in the family tomb.

== Church ==
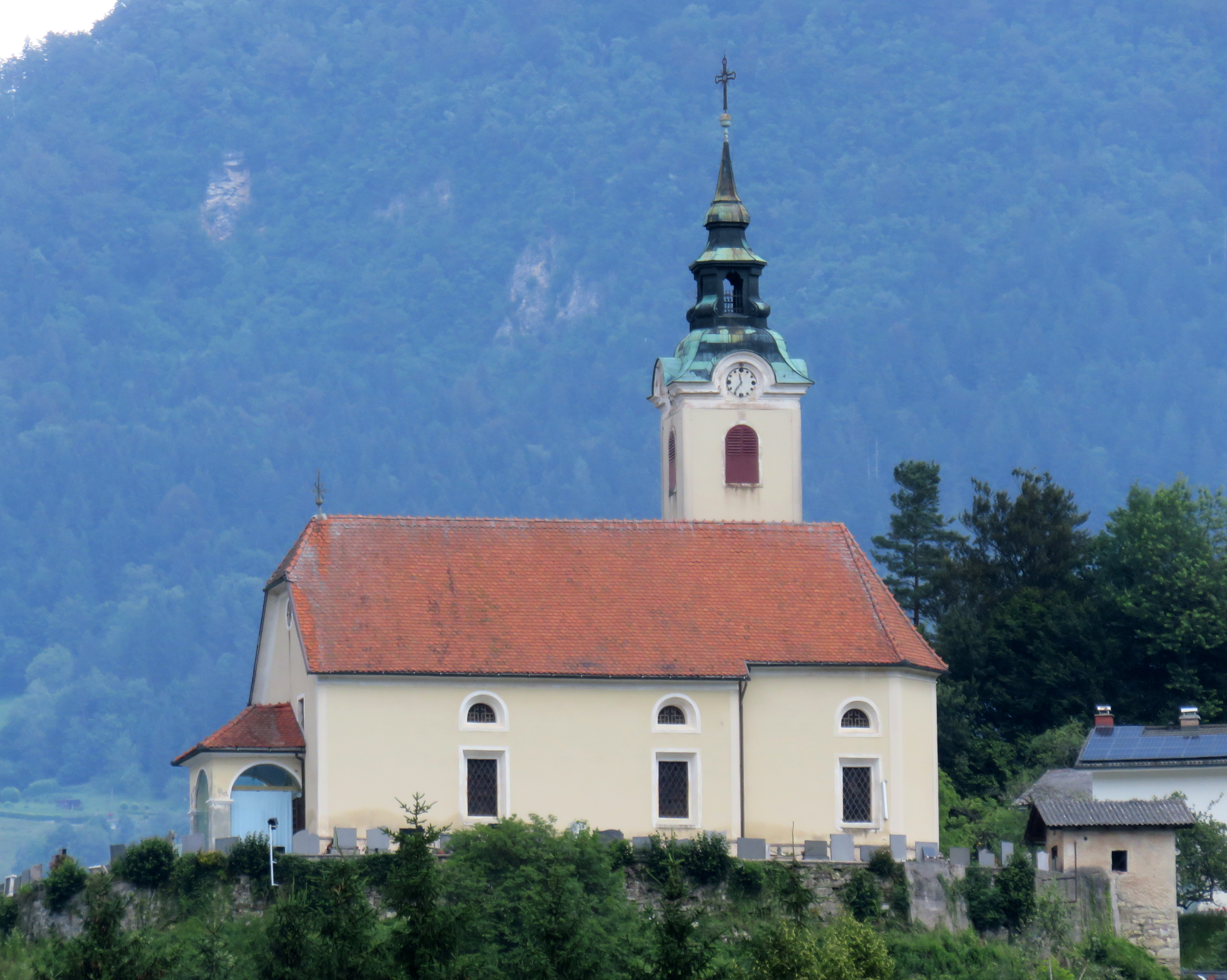
Saint George's Church

The parish church in the settlement is dedicated to Saint George (Slovene: sveti Jurij) and belongs to the Roman Catholic Archdiocese of Ljubljana. It dates to the 16th century.

== Notable people ==
Notable people that were born or lived in Izlake include:

- Janez Drnovšek (1950–2008), liberal politician, President of the Presidency of Yugoslavia, Prime Minister of Slovenia and President of Slovenia
- Alojz Prašnikar (1821–1889), industrialist
- Benigen Snoj (1867–1942), born Franc Snoj, priest and founder of the Parish of St. Cyril in New York
- Johann Weikhard von Valvasor (1641–1693), natural historian and a fellow of the Royal Society in London
